= List of incidents of cannibalism =

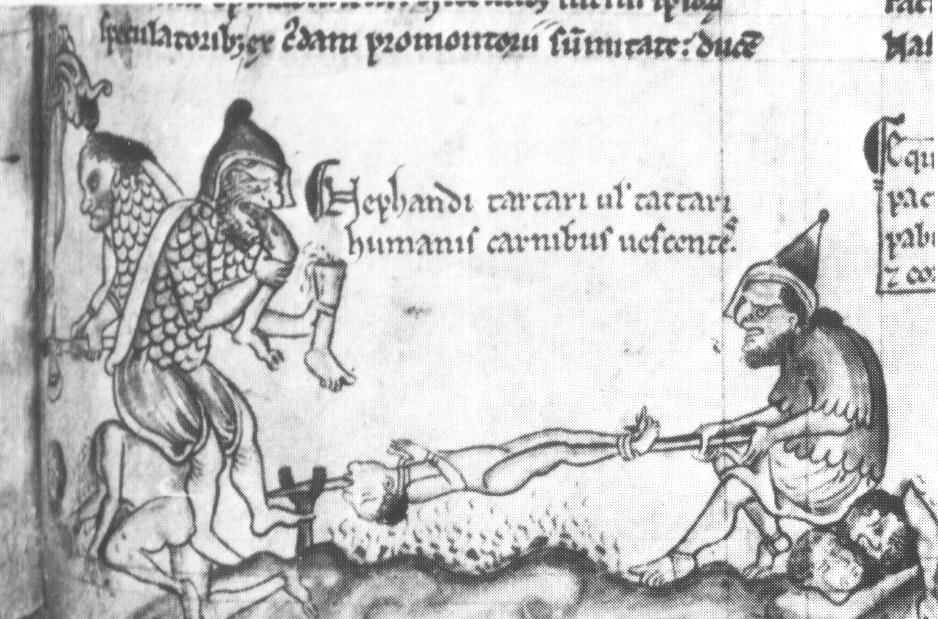
Depiction of Mongol cannibalism from Matthew Paris's chronicle (see § Middle Ages)

This is a list of incidents of cannibalism, or anthropophagy, the consumption of human flesh or internal organs by other human beings. Evidence of human cannibalism dates back as far as prehistoric times, and some anthropologists suggest that cannibalism was common in human societies as early as the Paleolithic. Historically, various peoples and groups have engaged in cannibalism, although very few continue the practice to this day.

Occasionally, starving people have resorted to cannibalism for survival. Classical antiquity recorded numerous references to cannibalism during siege-related famines. More recent well-documented examples include the Essex sinking in 1820, the Donner Party in 1846 and 1847, and the Uruguayan Air Force Flight 571 in 1972. Some murderers, such as Boone Helm, Albert Fish, Andrei Chikatilo, and Jeffrey Dahmer, are known to have eaten parts of their victims after killing them. Other individuals, such as journalist William Seabrook and artist Rick Gibson, have legally consumed human flesh out of curiosity or to attract attention to themselves.

== Prehistory ==
- The oldest archaeological evidence of hominid cannibalism comes from the Gran Dolina cave in northern Spain. The remains of several individuals who died about 800,000 years ago and may have belonged to the Homo antecessor species show unmistakable signs of having been butchered and consumed in the same way as animals whose bones were also found at the site. They belong to at least eleven individuals, all of which were young (ranging from infancy to late teenhood). Later finds include the remains of a young child (aged two to five) who was butchered about 850,000 years ago and "processed like any other prey", as cut marks show. A study explains the finds in the cave as due to "nutritional" cannibalism, where individuals belonging to hostile or unrelated groups were hunted, killed, and eaten much like animals.
- The 100,000-year-old bones of six Neanderthals found in the Moula-Guercy Cave, France, had been broken by other Neanderthals in such a way as to extract marrow and brains. Finds made in the Sidrón Cave in Spain also show evidence of exocannibalism.
- Genetic studies have revealed a "powerful episode" of natural selection concurrent with the extinction of the Neanderthals (about 40,000 years ago). Drawing on hundreds of studies in relation to the kuru disease which is only known to spread through cannibalism, researchers concluded that the 127V gene, which is known for resisting kuru-like diseases, indicates widespread cannibalism among early humans. If modern humans and Neanderthals, who co-existed at that time, both practised cannibalism, it is theorized this gene would have protected humans from such diseases, while Neanderthals, who might have lacked it, were more susceptible to them – a factor that might have contributed to their extinction.
- Human remains from about 40,000 years ago, found in the Goyet Caves in Belgium, show evidence of cannibalism. Bodies found at Goyet were skinned and fileted and bore cut marks on their bones, which had been cracked in order to extract the victim's bone marrow. They appeared to have been butchered for food in the same way as reindeer found at the same site. The victims were all women and children, with the presence of abundant other fauna at the site indicating that their consumption was not due to starvation. Researchers therefore interpret these acts as an element of inter-group aggression, in which weaker members of competing groups were deliberately targeted and eaten to weaken and drive off the group to which they belonged.
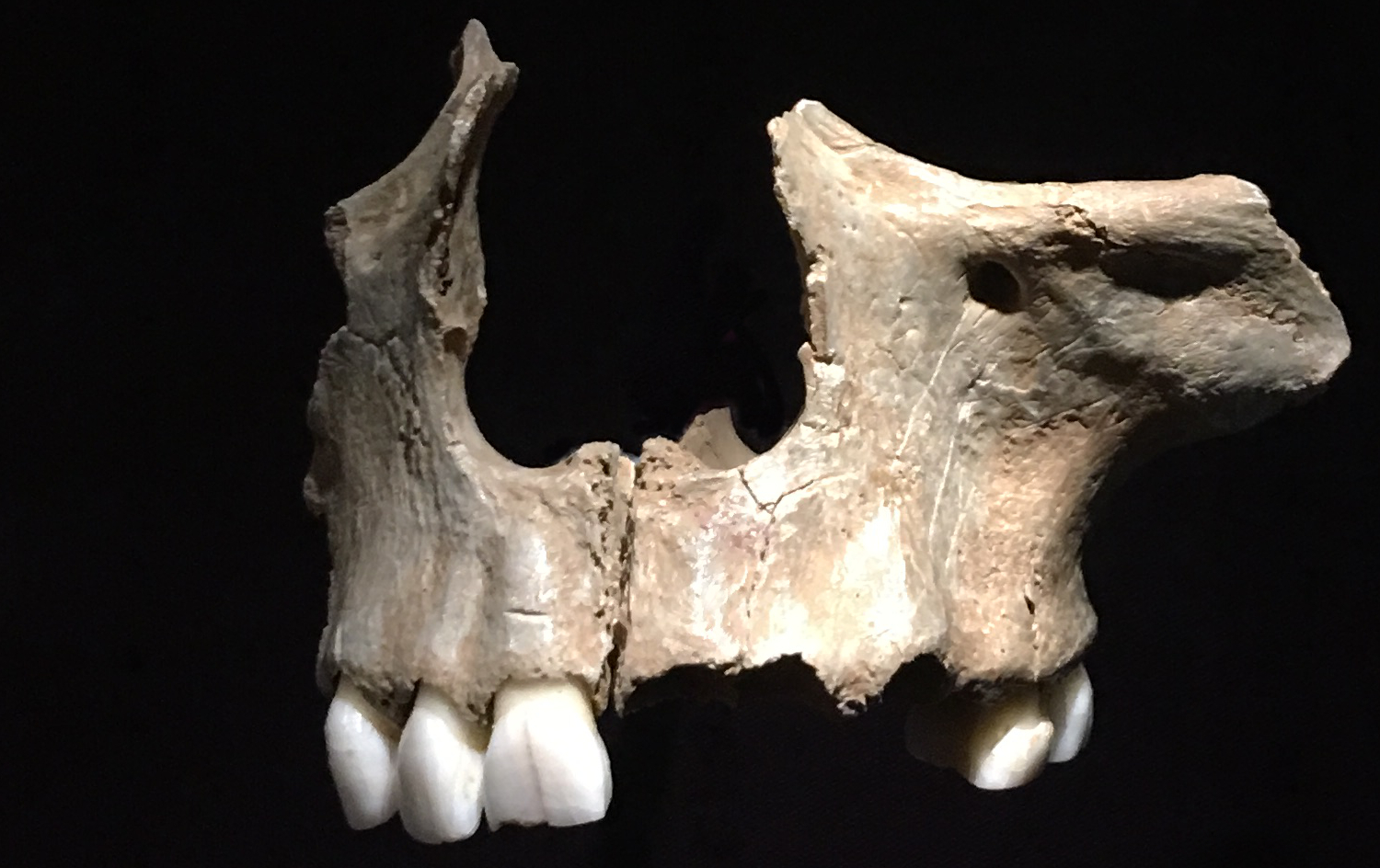
- A maxilla from Gough's Cave with cut marks near the teeth
  Human remains excavated from Gough's Cave in Somerset, England, indicate that people fashioned cranial bones into skull cups. The remains were almost 15,000 years old. Additionally, analysis of post-cranial bones shows signs of chewing (human tooth marks), defleshing, and cracking of bones for marrow extraction, suggesting that cannibalism was practised in Stone Age Britain. Similar evidence was found at other Magdalenian sites in central and western Europe.

== Early history ==
- About 1100 BCE in China, King Zhou of Shang imprisoned King Wen of Zhou. King Zhou cooked the son of King Wen and sent his flesh to King Wen as a test. King Wen did not know what it was and ate it. Believing this proved that King Wen was not a saint that could threaten his power, King Zhou released him. This proved fatal, as he was later dethroned by another son of King Wen.
- Duke Huan of Qi of China, ruling from 685 to 643 BCE, said to his cook Yiya, "The only thing I have not tried is steamed baby." Yiya then killed and steamed his own son and served him to Duke Huan. Duke Huan thought this proved his complete loyalty and trusted him with great power. But when Duke Huan got old, Yiya conspired with others to starve him to death.
- Duke Wen of Jin of China, in exile between 656 BCE and 636 BCE, ran out of food. His servant Jie Zhitui cut a piece of meat from his own buttocks and served it to Duke Wen. They survived the difficult time. Years later, Duke Wen did not treat Jie Zhitui well and he left in anger.
- The ancient Greek festival Lykaia, held at night at Mount Lykaion, was connected to the myth of Lycaon, who was said to have served the flesh of a slaughtered young boy – variously described as his son, grandson, an unrelated local child, or a hostage – to Zeus. Rumours of the festival that circulated among other Greeks likewise revolved around the themes of human sacrifice and cannibalism. According to Plato, Pausanias, and other sources, regular sacrifices to Zeus Lykaios were held at the mountain, during which the entrails of a human victim were mixed with those of animals. Whoever ate the human flesh was said to turn into a wolf, and only regain human form after nine years if he abstained from human flesh during this period.
- In 594 BCE in China, the inhabitants of the State of Song resorted to cannibalism after being under siege for five months. Considering it unbearable to eat their own children, families traded their children with each other so they could slaughter and consume the children of others. The same happened in 403 BCE in Jin Yang, nowadays Taiyuan, after one year of siege. Inhabitants of cities under siege also ate human flesh in 257 BCE in Handan and in 250 BCE in Liaocheng.
- Herodotus reports that King Astyages of the Median kingdom slew the teenage son of his general Harpagus in c. 590 BCE and served him to Harpagus in a banquet, to punish Harpagus for failing to kill the later Cyrus the Great (claimed to be Astyages's grandson). This subsequently motivated Harpagus to side with Cyrus in his rebellion against Astyages. The familial tie between Astyages and Cyrus is otherwise unconfirmed, and modern historians question the whole episode, suspecting that Herodotus or one of his sources invented it.
- Phalaris, who from c. 570 to 554 BCE ruled Greek-settled Agrigento in Sicily as a tyrant, reportedly consumed suckling babies.
- During the Peloponnesian War (431–404 BCE), the Athenian siege of the Corinthian colony of Potidaea reduced its inhabitants to cannibalism, according to the Athenian historian Thucydides.
- In 409 BCE, Yue Yang, a general for the state of Wei (in China) led an invasion into the state of Zhongshan. The head of Zhongshan got hold of Le Yang's son, cooked him, and sent his flesh to Le Yang. Le Yang ate it in public, thinking this showed his loyalty to Wei. However for the head of Wei this showed his lack of mercy towards everyone. He awarded Le Yang but distrusted him.
- During Cassander's siege of Olympias at Pydna in 317–316 BCE, the inhabitants suffered from severe famine. According to Diodorus Siculus, the besieged fed sawdust to their elephants and slaughtered their pack animals and horses for food. He further states that some non-Greeks in the city resorted to eating the bodies of the dead.
- In 260 BCE in China, cannibalism was practised in the army of the state of Zhao after it had been out of food for 46 days.
- About 200 BCE in China, at the beginning of Han dynasty, years of war wreaked havoc on the agricultural production. A horrible famine and cannibalism ensued, and half the population reportedly died. A great famine again led to cannibalism, this time in Pingyuan County, Shandong, when the Yellow River overflowed in 138 BCE. Famine-induced cannibalism is also reported for 135 BCE in Henan after flooding and drought and for 114 BCE in Shandong after flooding and several years of crop failure.
- In 134 BCE, during the Roman Republic's siege of Numantia, instances of cannibalism occurred.
- During the First Mithridatic War (89–85 BCE), Roman general Sulla laid siege to Athens, which was loyal to Mithridates VI of Pontus at the time. Threatened by starvation, Athenians resorted to cannibalism both according to the classical writer Appian and modern archaeological efforts.
- The Greek writer Strabo stated in his Geographica that some Scythians and Sarmatians ate human flesh, while others were vegetarians and ate no meat at all.
- In 48 BCE in China, famine led once to cannibalism in eleven counties in Henan and Shandong. Thirty-three years later, years of flood caused famine and cannibalism in Liangguo County, Henan, and Pingyuan County, Shandong.
- After Caesar's assassination, during the period of the Second Triumvirate in 43 BCE, the relatives of the writer Cicero were persecuted. His brother Quintus Tullius Cicero was betrayed by his own freedman Philologus. In revenge, Quintus's wife Pomponia ordered that Philologus be punished by cruel torture, which included forcing him to cut off pieces of his own flesh, then roasting and eating them.

== First millennium ==
- There were widespread wars, famines, epidemic and cannibalism during the later years of Emperor Wang Mang's reign, which lasted from 9 to 23 CE. The country's population halved by the time he died.
- During the siege of Jerusalem in 70 CE, a woman named Mary of Bethezuba was said to have cannibalized her infant son due to starvation.
- According to Tacitus in his Agricola, around 82 CE, a mutiny broke out among the Usipetes, a Germanic tribe that had been conscripted into the Roman army. They seized Roman ships and, after running out of provisions, resorted to cannibalism at sea by drawing lots to choose which crew members to eat.
- There were widespread wars, famines and cannibalism during the last few decades of the Han dynasty (ended in 220 CE). Many places became uninhabited. In Shaanxi province, there was a drought in 194 CE, followed by three years of war. People either fled or cannibalized each other. The region was practically deserted. At about the same time, there was a great famine with cannibalism in the area between the Yangtze and the Huai Rivers, which includes part of the provinces Jiangsu, Anhui and Henan. The population became very sparse. In 196 CE, a famine and cannibalism also happened in Youzhou, nowadays greater Beijing.
- About 337 CE, Chinese prince Shi Sui (石邃), son of Emperor Shi Hu, was obsessed with sex and violence. He repeatedly killed beautiful Buddhist nuns after raping them. He then boiled their flesh together with beef and lamb before consuming it. For some banquets, he reportedly had one of his concubines beheaded and cooked in his kitchen, regaling his guests with her flesh while displaying her head as decoration.
- St. Jerome, in his 393 CE treatise Against Jovinianus, claimed that the British Attacotti were cannibals who regarded the buttocks and breasts of humans as delicacies.
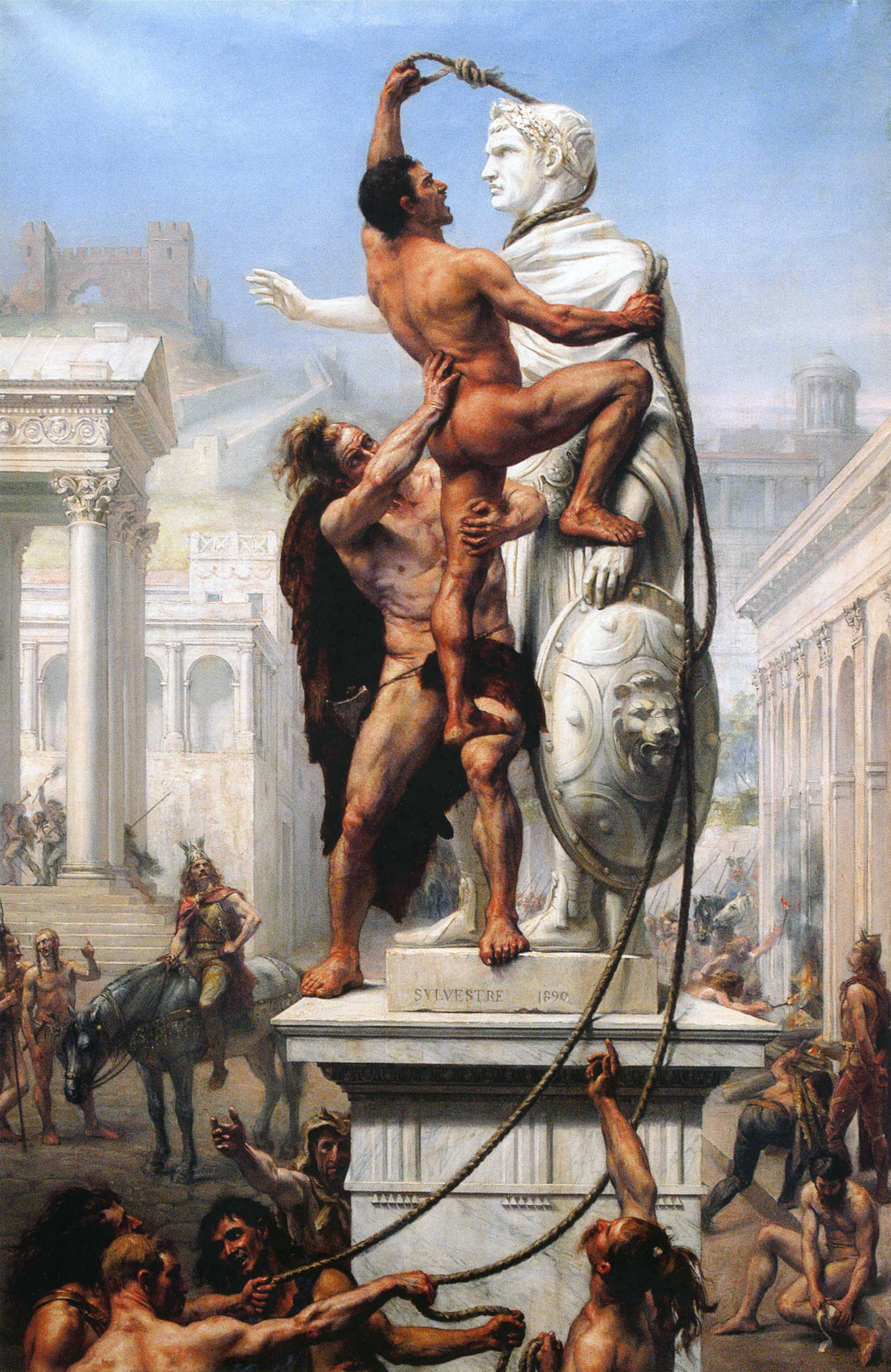
- Starving Romans may have eaten human flesh before the sack of Rome (painting by Joseph-Noël Sylvestre, 1890)
  In 409 CE, the Visigoths under the command of Alaric I took control of Rome by convincing the Romans to install Priscus Attalus as usurper instead of the legitimate emperor Honorius. In order to regain control, Honorius blockaded the city's ports, and in the resulting famine "some persons were suspected of having partaken of human flesh", as the historian Sozomen writes. Angry at having lost the city, Alaric laid siege to Rome again, finally conquering and sacking it in 410 CE. According to St. Jerome's account, the siege led to another cruel famine, in which "the starving people had recourse to hideous food and tore each other limb from limb that they might have flesh to eat. Even the mother did not spare the babe at her breast." He also describes the sack as very brutal, claiming that "numberless" citizens were killed. Procopius likewise writes that "the Romans ... being destroyed by hunger and other suffering ... were tasting each other's flesh". However, another contemporary historian, Orosius, reported that the sack involved little if any loss of life, and he did not mention cannibalism. It is unclear which source is closer to the truth, but archaeological evidence shows that few buildings were destroyed, pointing to a relatively mild sack. On the other hand, the city's population shrank from 800,000 inhabitants before the sieges to less than half of that nine years later.
- Around 410 CE, during the Suebi tribe's invasion of Iberia, their plundering caused widespread famine, leading to incidents of cannibalism. Some parents killed their own children for food, while neighbours reportedly boiled and ate one another.
- In 503, during the Persian siege of the Byzantine city of Amida, there were reports of women cooking human flesh mixed with shoe leather. The Persians executed those who murdered others for their flesh, but tolerated the consumption of corpses.
- In 536, during a famine under the rule of the Ostrogoths in Italy, the early papal records recount that in the region of Liguria, some mothers ate their own children due to extreme hunger. Similar incidents were recorded in 539 in the Emilia-Romagna region.
- In 546, during the Ostrogothic siege of Piacenza in Italy, cases of cannibalism were reported.
- In 548, Chinese rebel Hou Jing besieged Emperor Wu of Liang in Nanjing city. There was famine and cannibalism on both sides. The emperor allowed prisoners of war to be sold as food. They were "caged" and "whenever there was a demand for meat, some of them were taken out, cut, broiled and consumed". Four years later, when Hou Jing was defeated, parts of his body were salted and distributed in the regions that had suffered the most from his wars. There they were boiled in stews and eaten by angry mobs.
- There were widespread wars, famines and cannibalism in China during the later years of Emperor Yang of Sui's reign, which lasted from 604 to 618. Nearly half of the population died. Many places became uninhabited. During this time of chaos and lawlessness, there were also reports of gastronomic cannibalism not motivated by scarcity. In one case, "a wealthy man named Zhuge Ang who was open and high-spirited" reportedly held a feast, attended by "hundreds of guests", where a "pair of teenage twin brothers" was served boiled, in addition to pork and mutton. On the basis of this and similar accounts, the Chinese author Zheng Yi concluded that "the rich competed in wealth, a sport that included competition over cannibalism" as one way of surprising one's guests with exotic novelty food.
- In 619, the army of Chinese rebel Zhu Can hunted down women and children for food. They also killed and ate government representatives who had come to negotiate ceasefire. As the custom to eat steamed children spread in his army, Zhu Can boldly declared: "Of all the delicious things to eat, none surpasses human flesh. As long as there are people in neighboring districts we have nothing to fear from famine." He is said to have used a large inverted bell with a capacity of 200 bushels (7 cubic metres) to stew the flesh of children and women, which was then divided among his officers and some of his 200,000 soldiers.
- In 621, the Chinese general Li Shiji was very upset that his good friend Shan Xiongxin was going to be executed for rebellion and he could not do anything about it. Li Shiji cut a piece of flesh from his buttocks for Shan Xiongxin to eat, and told Shan, "We will be parted by death but this flesh of mine is now going to the grave with you."
- After the Battle of Uhud in 625, Hind bint Utba ate (or at least attempted to) the liver of Hamza ibn Abd al-Muttalib, an uncle of Muhammad. At that time, the liver was considered "the seat of life". While at that time Hind opposed the spread of Islam, she converted a few years later.
- A severe famine in 698–700 was the first famine in Ireland for which the historian Cormac Ó Gráda found references to cannibalism. Cannibalism is also documented for a famine in 1116 and for several ones in the 16th and 17th centuries, including reports of little children being killed so they could be eaten. He also found a few accounts pointing to the consumption of corpses in the Great Irish Famine in the late 1840s, but concludes that in that famine cannibalism must have been rare, as there is very little "hard evidence" for it.
- During the Siege of Suiyang in China in 757, General Zhang Xun killed his concubine to feed the soldiers. Half of the population, 20,000–30,000 people, were eaten.
- During a famine in Europe from 792 to 794, incidents of cannibalism were reported.
- During the reign of Basil I, the Aghlabids captured Syracuse, the Byzantine capital of Sicily, in 878 after a prolonged siege. According to the eyewitness account of the monk Theodosius, the resulting famine became so extreme that some of the besieged resorted to cannibalism; a traumatic event later interpreted as divine punishment for collective sins.
- In 884, the army of Chinese rebel Qin Zongquan carried salted human corpses as food. Elderly people and children were slaughtered like sheep. Some of the human flesh was sold on public marketplaces to finance the rebel army.
- A 10-century writer from the Abbasid Caliphate described the inhabitants of the Andaman Islands as cannibals who liked to kill and eat people, including sailors who were at risk of being kidnapped and consumed when their ships landed on these islands to get water.
- In 975, during a famine in Paris, cases of cannibalism occurred.
- There was a custom in southern Taiwan in which people ate the deceased.
- In 979, Đỗ Thích, who assassinated Đinh Bộ Lĩnh, was captured by Nguyễn Bặc, who had him executed, his bones crushed, and his flesh cut into pieces and distributed among the people, who were forced to eat it, according to scholar Đào Duy Anh.

=== In China ===
- The following are incidents of cannibalism in China caused by famines, according to the official Twenty-Four Histories. The famines were due to natural disasters and/or wars.
  - 14 CE, famine near northern border of the country.
  - 25 CE, famine in the capital Xi'an in Shaanxi province, caused by the plundering of the Red Eyebrows rebels.
  - 26 CE, the Shaanxi province.
  - 27 CE, between the provinces Shaanxi and Henan.
  - 109 CE, the capital Luoyang in Henan province, and the provinces Shanxi and Gansu.
  - 151 CE, Rencheng county of Shandong and Liangguo county of Henan.
  - 155 CE, capital Luoyang in Henan province and Jizhou county in Hebei province.
  - 311 CE, famine in Shaanxi province.
  - 316 CE in northern China.
  - 351 CE, Si Province and Jizhou Province, approximately Hebei and Henan nowadays.
  - 352 CE, the city of Ye, Hebei.
  - 385 CE, the capital Xi'an.
  - 385 CE, Beijing and Hebei province, due to years of warfare. The population almost died out.
  - 387 CE, Liang Province. More than half of the population died.
  - 399 CE, in the east during the rebellion of Sun En.
  - 401 CE, Nanjing during the coup of Huan Xuan.
  - 402 CE, city of Guzang, nowadays Wuwei, Gansu. More than 100 thousand people died.
  - 403 CE, Zhejiang and Jiangsu provinces.
  - About 450 CE, Qingzhou, Shandong.
  - 502 CE, Yizhou, nowadays Sichuan.
  - 525, Fenzhou, nowadays part of Shanxi. One third of the population died.
  - About 533, Guangling, nowadays Yangzhou, Jiangsu.
  - 536, Shaanxi. 70–80% of the population died.
  - 549, Jiujiang, Jiangxi. Nearly half of the population died.
  - 550, capital Nanjing.
  - 618, Hexi Corridor.
  - 682, the capital Xi'an.
  - 760, the capital Luoyang, Henan.
  - 822, city of Huainan, Anhui.
  - 884, Henan and neighbouring provinces. Dozens of counties became uninhabited.
  - 886, part of Hubei province.
  - 944, part of Shaanxi.
- The following are incidents of cannibalism in China that were caused by sieges, according to the Twenty-Four Histories.
  - 23 CE, the siege of Wancheng city, nowadays part of Nanyang, Henan.
  - 27 CE, Jicheng, nowadays part of Beijing.
  - 195 CE, Dongjun, Shandong. To inspire his soldiers, the mayor Zang Hong (臧洪) killed his concubine to feed them.
  - 238 CE, city of Xiangping, nowadays Liaoyang, Liaoning.
  - 311 CE, the capital Luoyang, Henan.
  - 316 CE, the city of Xi'an. More than half of the population died.
  - 402 CE the city of Nan'an, Gansu.
  - 441 CE Jiuquan, Gansu. Ten thousand people died of hunger. The general of the besieged army, Juqu Tianzhou (沮渠天周), killed his wife to feed the troops.
  - 499 CE, Majuan city, known today as Dengzhou, Henan.
  - 555 CE, city of Ye, Hebei.
  - 618 CE, the city of Yongji, Shanxi.
  - 620 CE, Luoyang, Henan.
  - 757 CE, the city of Nanyang, Henan.
  - 759 CE, the city of Ye, Hebei.
  - 775 CE, the city of Cangzhou, Hebei.
  - 869 CE, the city of Haozhou, Anhui.
  - 886 CE, Jiangling County, Hubei.
  - 887 CE, the city of Yangzhou, Jiangsu.
  - 887 CE, Jiangling County, Hubei.
  - 902 CE, Fengxiang, Shaanxi.
  - 906 CE Cangzhou, Hebei.
  - 909 CE, Cangzhou, Hebei, again due to siege, but by a different warlord. Every day, people were killed and butchered to feed the soldiers.
  - 909 CE, the city of Qingzhou, Shandong.
  - 947 CE, Tong Pass.
  - 947 CE, the city of Xi'an, Shaanxi.
- The following are incidents of cannibalism in China that happened in armies and were unrelated to sieges. They include cannibalism among the soldiers, eating the corpses of enemies, and hunting of civilians for food.
  - 194 CE, in Cao Cao's army.
  - 304 CE, in Zhang Fang's army.
  - 306 CE, the army of Pan Tao (潘滔) hunted civilians for food.
  - 311 CE, the army of the rebel Hou Du hunted people for food.
  - 312 CE, in Shi Le's army.
  - 385 CE, the defenders of the capital Xi'an ate the dead enemies.
  - 386 CE, the army of Emperor Fu Deng ate the dead enemies.
  - 529, general Yuan Hao's soldiers ate the hearts of 37 captured enemies.
  - 662, in the army of general Zheng Rentai (郑仁泰).
  - 868, the army of the rebel Pang Xun hunted civilians for food.
  - 881, government troops hunted civilians and sold them to rebels as food for a high price.
  - 883, the army of rebel Huang Chao hunted civilians for food. Thousands of people were killed daily.
  - 888, the army of the rebel Li Hanzhi hunted civilians for food.
  - 893, the army of the warlord Li Keyong ate dead enemies.
  - 963, the army of Li Chuyun (李处耘) killed dozens of prisoners of war for food.
- The following incidents of cannibalism in China happened during or after a capital punishment. Some were spontaneous acts by those who hated the executed, while others were ordered as part of the punishment. Here we just list the names of the executed.
  - 23 CE, the prior emperor Wang Mang.
  - 319 CE, the rebel Du Zeng.
  - 321 CE, the rebel Xu Kan.
  - 409 CE, the murderers of Emperor Daowu of Northern Wei and of Emperor Wen of Song.
  - 498 CE, a rebel who killed the family of Wang Su, an important official of the state of Northern Wei.
  - 502 CE, the rebel Sun Wenming.
  - 554, Lu Huili, an army captain who failed to save his superior.
  - About 590, Wang Wentong, a notoriously cruel official.
  - 613, the rebel Yang Xuangan and his extended family as well as the defector Husi Zheng (斛斯政).
  - 617, the son of Yu Xin, by rebels.
  - 739, eunuch Niu Xiantong (牛仙童) who had lost the emperor's favour.
  - 911, the pacifist Sun He (孙鹤) who had offended a warlord.
  - 922, the rebel Zhang Chujin and his cohorts.
  - 929, deserters from the government army.
  - 930, the loyalist Yao Hong (姚洪), by rebels.
  - 934, the widely hated official Xue Wenjie.
  - 947, the rebel Yang Chengxun (杨承勋) and Zhang Yanze, a cruel official.
  - 948, the traitor Du Chongwei.
  - 963, the rebel Zhang Wenbiao (张文表).
- The following are some incidents of cannibalism in China that had no better reason than simply cruelty or a gastronomic desire for human flesh.
  - About 555–560, Emperor Wenxuan of Northern Qi sometimes had people killed and eaten when he felt upset.
  - 969, general Wang Yansheng (王彦昇) cut prisoners' ears off as snacks for drinking.
  - 970, general Wang Jixun (王继勋) often killed and ate servants he did not like.

== Middle Ages ==
- In the early 11th century, a famine lasting five years hit large parts of Europe, according to chronicler Rodulfus Glaber. Many adults and children were consumed; desperate men ate their own mothers, while mothers used their own babies for food. During another pan-European famine from 1032 to 1035, affecting countries from Greece to France and Britain, numerous instances of cannibalism were recorded: bandits ambushed travellers on roads to kill and eat them; travellers taken in at night were murdered and consumed by their hosts; children were lured away with as little as an apple and eaten. A vendor selling human flesh in a market was executed; the flesh he had tried to sell was buried, but someone later unearthed and consumed it.
- In China, the consumption of human flesh was considered an effective medical treatment at least since the Tang dynasty (618–907). It was recommended by the Bencao Shiyi, an influential medical reference book published in the early 8th century, as well as in similar later manuals. Filial piety accordingly led to various cases of young people – most often women – cutting flesh out of their bodies and giving it to an ill parent or parent-in-law for consumption. The Twenty-Four Histories describe more than 110 cases of such voluntary offerings that took place between the early 7th and the early 20th centuries. There were still occasional cases in the 1970s and 1980s. The body parts cut most often were thighs, upper arms, and livers.
- In the immediate aftermath of the Harrying of the North in 1070, survivors were forced to resort to cannibalism to avoid starvation in the resulting famine.
- Some crusaders were reported to have practised cannibalism during the sieges of Antioch and of Ma'arra in 1097–1098.
- In 1204, during the siege of Château Gaillard by Philip II of France against the English-held Normandy, the castle's garrison, seeking to reduce the number of "useless mouths", expelled refugees in groups. Initially, the besieging troops allowed them to pass, but the king later forbade it, forcing the refugees back toward the castle. The garrison refused to reopen the gates, and the refugees, trapped in the no man's land between the two forces, consumed everything, including the meat and skins of straying dogs. When a woman gave birth, a group of men snatched the baby and tore it into several pieces, which they then consumed. About 150 years later, cannibalism due to starvation was also reported from a group of refugees who found themselves stuck between town walls and siege lines during the siege of Calais (1346–1347).
- Archaeologists found evidence of cannibalism in a Native American tribe in what is now Colorado, dating to 1150.
- There is evidence that some Tibetan Buddhists ritualistically consumed pills made from the flesh of deceased people who were believed to have been born as Brahmins seven times, which could aid in attaining enlightenment.
- Numerous incidents of cannibalism were recorded during a severe drought of 1200–1201 in the Nile River region. According to a detailed report by the Arab physician Abd al-Latif al-Baghdadi, the roasted or boiled bodies of young children, killed by kidnappers or their own parents, were eaten and sold as food; some older children and adults also fell victim to cannibalism. Though initially shocked, people became accustomed to such acts. Some even developed a liking for human flesh, which could also be found in elaborate dishes catering to the wealthy.
- The Waldensians, deemed heretical by the Catholic Church, were accused of cannibalism in Inquisition reports.
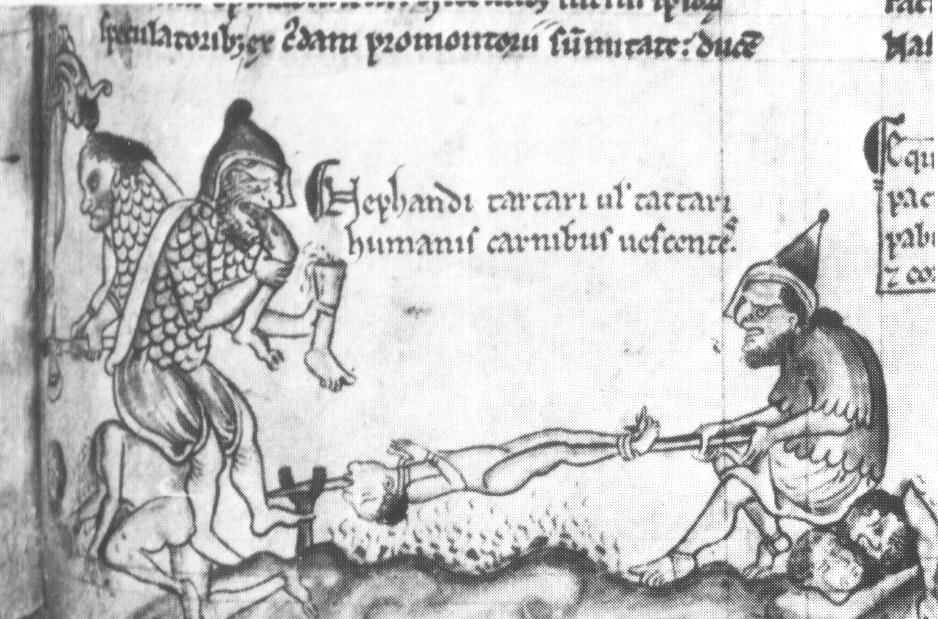
- Depiction of Mongol cannibalism from Matthew Paris's chronicle
  The Mongols were reported by several European chroniclers such as Matthew Paris to have engaged in cannibalism. Giovanni da Pian del Carpine stated they did so only out of necessity, but Simon of Saint-Quentin believed they were also motivated by pleasure and a desire to instil fear into their enemies. They invaded Hungary (Pannonia) and penetrated Austria almost to Vienna in 1241–1242. To the south of Vienna, they reached the Austrian town of Wiener Neustadt and devastated the countryside around it, torturing and eating civilians regardless of their age, sex, fortune, or class. According to Frenchman Ivo of Narbonne, who was in the town at that time, their soldiers ate old and deformed women right away, while virgin girls and beautiful women were gang-raped to death and then eaten; their breasts were cut off and served to the Mongol leaders as special delicacies. A Chinese writer who had lived through the Mongol-led Yuan dynasty (1271–1368) likewise complained about their cannibalism, criticizing that Mongol soldiers did not hesitate to sacrifice civilians for their culinary pleasure: "Young children were the most appreciated; women came next and men last." He also criticized their cruelty, stating that victims were roasted alive (on iron grates) or boiled alive (by placing them "inside a double bag ... which was put into a large pot"). Just like Ivo of Narbonne's, his account indicates that breasts were particularly prized – if there were more corpses around than needed, they were sometimes the only part of a woman's body that was eaten. The Song Shi written during, as well as later chronicles written about the dynasty, also note that children and "the weak were killed and eaten" during war campaigns at that time.
- The Castilian legal code Siete Partidas, a set of Roman and Germanic laws promulgated by King Alfonso X of Castile and compiled between 1256 and 1265, contains a provision according to which feudal obligations take precedence over parental duties: a father serving his lord in a castle, if lacking food, may choose to eat his child rather than abandon his post without authorization. The expansion of paternal authority provided similar justification for any father committing the same act during periods of severe starvation, namely killing and consuming his child for his own survival: "If he can do this for his lord, it is appropriate that he be able to do it for himself as well."
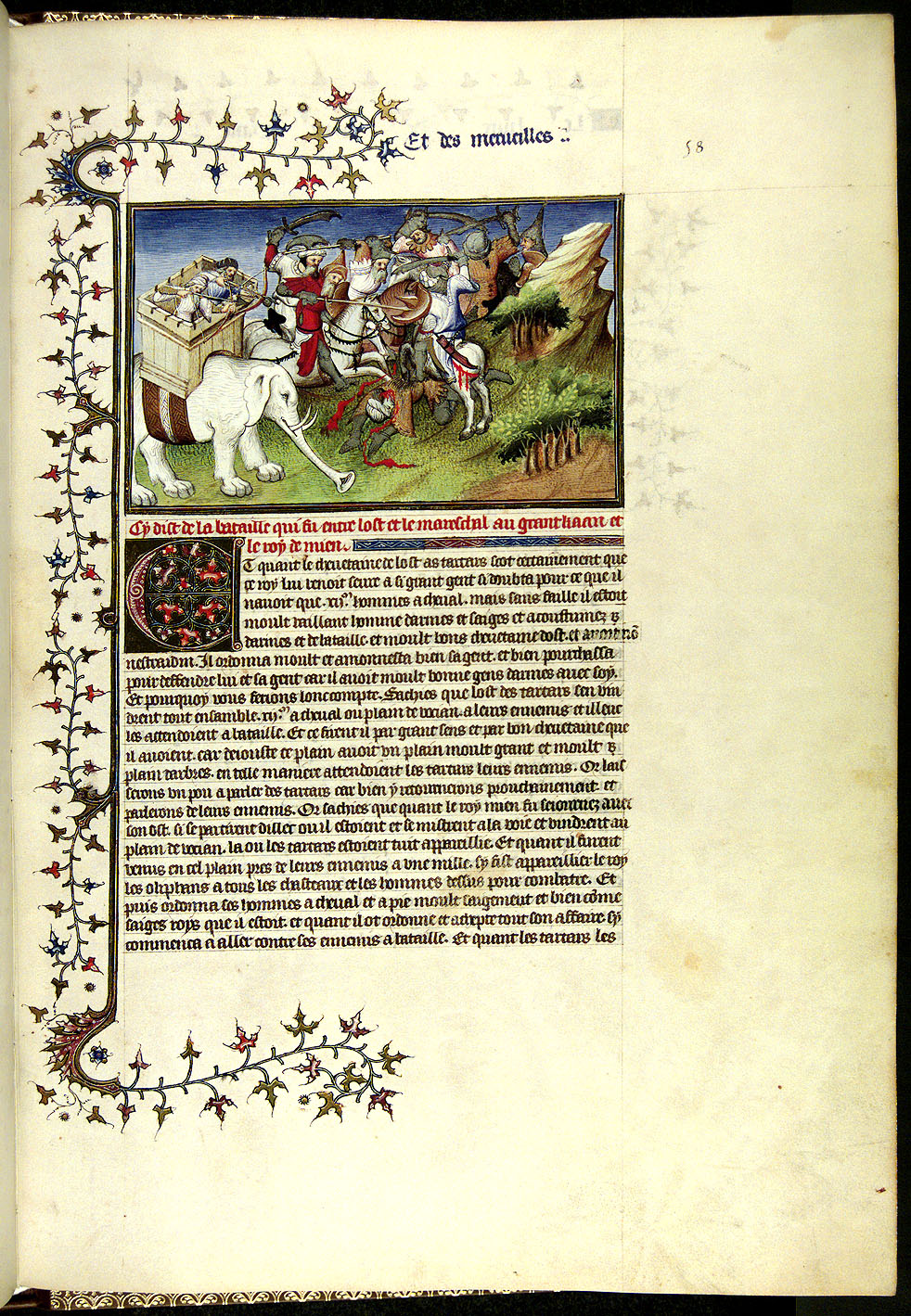
- A page of The Travels of Marco Polo
  After his return from China in the late 13th century, Marco Polo wrote about the "kingdom of Fuzhou" in the south-east of the country that "they eat all manner of foul things and any kind of meat, including human flesh, which they devour with great relish. They will not touch someone who has died of natural causes, but if he has been stabbed to death or otherwise killed they eat him all up and consider it a great delicacy." Soldiers regularly drank the blood and ate the flesh of those they had killed, he added.
- In 1305, Giovanni do Aleramici, the marquess of Montferrat in Italy, died. Giovanni's personal doctor was suspected to have poisoned him and was subsequently stabbed to death by Giovanni's vassals, many of whom "ate his flesh", according to the chronicler Guglielmo Ventura.
- In 1311, when the army of the Holy Roman Empire besieged the city of Brescia in northern Italy at the southern foothills of the Alps, the citizens of Brescia held out by eating the corpses of the imperial troops, according to the Cronaca Varignana. In retaliation, the imperial army captured the Brescian leader Tebaldo Brusado, paraded him outside the city, then beheaded and dismembered him. Enraged, the citizens of Brescia seized the emperor's nephew and ate him.
- There are various reports of cannibalism during the Great Famine of 1315–1317 in Europe, including cases of desperate people killing and consuming their own family members.
- According to the 14th-century traveller Odoric of Pordenone, the inhabitants of Lamuri, a kingdom in northern Sumatra, purchased slave children from foreign merchants to "slaughter them in the shambles and eat them". Odoric states that the kingdom was wealthy and there was no lack of other food, suggesting that the custom was driven by a preference for human flesh rather than by hunger.
- The chronicle of Michele da Piazza recounts that in 1337, at Geraci, a city contested between the Ventimiglia and Chiaromonte families, a new dispute with the Palizzi family, allies of the Chiaromonte and backed by the new monarch Peter II, led to Francesco Ventimiglia being marked as a traitor. Besieged in Geraci, he was killed, or perhaps died accidentally, while trying to escape the enraged citizens. The inhabitants of Geraci then abused his body, cutting off his fingers, gouging out his eyes, smashing his teeth with stones, and cutting off his beard with a meat knife until he was "split from one part to another"; the chronicler adds that some "ate his liver".
- In war-torn Scotland in 1341, "the starving sufferers were forced to devour the most loathsome things; among them, a villain named Christian Cleik and his wife lived by capturing and eating the flesh of children—they lured children with traps and then consumed them. The wretched cannibal demons were eventually discovered, convicted, and burned at the stake."
- In 1357, King Pedro of Portugal killed three of the men who had murdered his lover Inês de Castro and bit into their hearts. Previously, while still a prince, Pedro had fallen in love with Inês, a lady-in-waiting to his betrothed, but because the match was deemed unequal, his father Afonso IV ordered three men to kill her. Pedro launched a rebellion as a result, and although defeated, he remained resentful, leading to this act. According to legend, Pedro later had Inês's corpse exhumed at his coronation and compelled the court to swear allegiance to her as queen.
- Jean le Bel's account of the Jacquerie uprising in northern France in 1358 states that the rebels roasted a nobleman alive and then forced his wife to eat his flesh before raping and murdering her and their children.
- In 1380, during an anti-tax revolt in Montpellier in southern France, royal officials were, according to one account, quartered by the mob, which ate some of the flesh and threw the rest to animals.
- In 1385, an anti-taxation riot broke out in Ferrara, Italy. In exchange for his own safety, the marquess turned over the man in charge of tax policies, Tommaso da Tortona, to the rioters. Da Tortona's heart and liver were torn out and eaten, while some other parts of his body were hung in the harbour as a warning.
- From late 1418 to early 1419, during the siege of Rouen, after cats, dogs, and rats had all been eaten, reports of cannibalism also emerged.
- In 1437, a man from the village of Acquapendente in central Italy murdered a boy who had accidentally killed his son, and served the boy's cooked body parts to his father in an act of revenge. This led to a feud between the two families, which took the lives of 36 people during the following month.
- In 1438, near the end of the Hundred Years' War, a woman in Abbeville, France, was found to have killed and dismembered two children and preserved their corpses in salt to face off starvation.
- According to the physician Leonardo Fioravanti, a Neapolitan named Pasquale Gibilotti claimed that his father had served as a supplier in the army of King Alfonso of Naples during the war between the Angevin and Aragonese dynasties in 1456. At that time, due to a lack of food, especially meat, "suppliers from both armies secretly cut pieces of flesh from corpses at night, used them to prepare various dishes, and sold them to the unfortunate soldiers. This went on for a long time without being discovered".
- In Milan in 1476, Galeazzo Maria Sforza was assassinated on his way to mass at the church of Santo Stefano by Giovanni Andrea Lampugnani and his accomplices. The assassin fared no better: as he tried to flee, Lampugnani stumbled and fell, was overtaken by the duke's attendants, and killed. His body was immediately desecrated, dragged to his house and hung by one foot from a window, then dragged through the streets of the city until the following day. The chronicle of Gabriele Fontana adds that "some citizens bit off his heart, liver, and hands".
- In 1494, during the French invasion of Italy, while besieging the city of Naples, merchants sold human flesh to the French army.
- The Aztecs practised cannibalism in the context of human sacrifice, though there is debate about how widespread the practice was and disagreement about whether human flesh was a significant part of their diet.
- The Kalinago (Island Caribs) practised ritual cannibalism.
- The following were the famines in China that caused cannibalism, according to the official Twenty-Four Histories. These famines were caused by natural disasters and/or wars.
  - 1048, famine in Hebei province.
  - 1118, part of Hebei and Shanxi.
  - 1129, Shandong province. Rebel armies carried corpses as food.
  - 1210, around the city of Nanjing, Jiangsu.
  - 1216, Hebei province.
  - About 1237, Anhui province.
  - 1272 Xiangyang, Hubei.
  - 1308, Henan and Shandong provinces.
  - 1328–1329, Shaanxi province.
  - 1329, Henan province.
  - 1342, Datong of Shanxi and neighbouring area due to drought.
  - 1343, part of Henan and Shanxi provinces due to crop failure.
  - 1344, part of Henan and Shandong due to rain and flood.
  - 1345, part of Shandong and North Jiangsu due to crop failure.
  - 1347, part of Henan province.
  - 1348, again part of Henan province. Over half of the population died.
  - 1349, eastern Shandong province due to crop failure.
  - 1352, northern Hubei province due to drought.
  - 1353, Anhui province.
  - 1354, various counties in Zhejiang, Fujian, Jiangxi and Guangxi provinces.
  - 1355, the capital Beijing.
  - 1358, Beijing and some counties in Shandong, Shaanxi and Hebei.
  - 1359, over 50 counties and cities across different provinces.
  - 1360, Beijing.
  - 1362, three counties in Henan.
  - 1457, Beijing and Shandong.
  - 1484, Shaanxi and Shanxi provinces.
- The following were the sieges in China that caused cannibalism, according to the Twenty-Four Histories.
  - 1215, the siege of the city of Zhongdu, nowadays Beijing.
  - 1227, Qingzhou, Shandong. Nearly all civilians were eaten, with only thousands surviving from an initial population of hundreds of thousands.
  - 1232, city of Kaifeng, Henan.
  - 1233, Tangzhou, Henan. The general killed his concubine to feed the soldiers. The soldiers also killed their wives and children for food.
  - 1234, Caizhou, nowadays Runan County, of Henan Province.
  - 1276, Yangzhou, Jiangsu.
  - 1277, Luzhou, Sichuan.
  - 1262, Jinan, Shandong.
  - About 1329, Huai'an, Jiangsu.
  - 1359, Shangrao, Jiangxi.
- The following were incidents of cannibalism in China committed in armies that were unrelated to sieges.
  - 1231, the army of rebel Xia Ning (Chinese: 夏寧) hunted civilians for food.
  - 1215, the army of rebel Li Quan hunted civilians for food.
  - 1216, rebels dug out civilians from their underground shelter and butchered them for food.
  - 1228, the army of the general Wanyan Baisa (完颜白撒) hunted civilians for food.
  - 1301, members of the army of general Liu Shen (刘深) cannibalized each other.
  - 1360, the government army hunted civilians for food in Fangshan, Beijing.
  - 1385, the army of the rebel Han Lin'er hunted civilians for food.
- The following were the incidents of cannibalism in China that happened during or after a capital punishment. Some were spontaneous acts by those who hated the executed, while others were ordered as part of the punishment. Only the names of the executed are listed.
  - 1121, loyalist Zhan Liangchen (Chinese: 詹良臣) who refused to surrender to the rebels.
  - 1131, loyalist Sun Zhiwei (孙知微) who refused to surrender to the rebels.
  - 1233, the defector Guo Yongan (国用安) was cannibalized after suicide.
  - 1338, loyalist Xiao Jingmao (蕭景茂).
  - 1465, general Peng Lun (彭伦) had captured rebels executed and cannibalized.
- The following incidents of cannibalism in China were apparently due to cruelty or a gastronomic desire for human flesh.
  - 1053, the mother of chieftain Nong Zhigao killed children to eat their flesh at every meal.
  - About 1426, Zhu Youxi (朱有熺), a member of the royal family, was banished for eating human livers and brains.

== 16th century ==
- In 1503, a group of Qizilbash militants ate the corpses of their enemies after taking over a fort in east Iran.
- On 21 July 1514, the captured Hungarian rebel leader György Dózsa was condemned to sit on a smouldering, heated iron throne, and forced to wear a heated iron crown and scepter (mocking his ambition to be king). While he was suffering, a procession of nine fellow rebels who had been starved beforehand were led to this throne. Next, executioners removed some pliers from a fire and forced them into Dózsa's skin. After tearing his flesh, the remaining rebels were ordered to bite spots where the hot pliers had been inserted and to swallow the flesh. The three or four who refused were simply cut up, prompting the others to comply. In the end, Dózsa died from the ordeal, while the rebels who obeyed were released.
- In 1521, two Frenchmen named Pierre Burgot and Michel Verdun were executed for murder and lycanthropy after they admitted having killed and eaten six children while transformed into werewolves.
- An English expedition to Newfoundland in 1536 led by Richard Hore allegedly resorted to cannibalism after running out of supplies around Funk Island. One crewman supposedly killed another and was later found eating broiled meat which he declared was "a piece of such a man's buttock" when confronted. Despite a denunciation of cannibalism from the captain, the situation grew so desperate that the crew decided to draw lots to decide who would be eaten next, but were saved by the timely arrival of a French ship which they boarded before sailing it back to England. Some modern historians such as Philip Levy have questioned this account, noting that the one actual incident of cannibalism was not directly witnessed by the men who recounted the story, and suggest that the man's confession of cannibalism may have been intended to scare his crewmates rather than as a truthful confession.
- Several works by Michel de Montaigne and Jean de Léry, among others, indicate that the South American Tupinambá people practised cannibalism, killing and eating their enemies as an act of revenge.
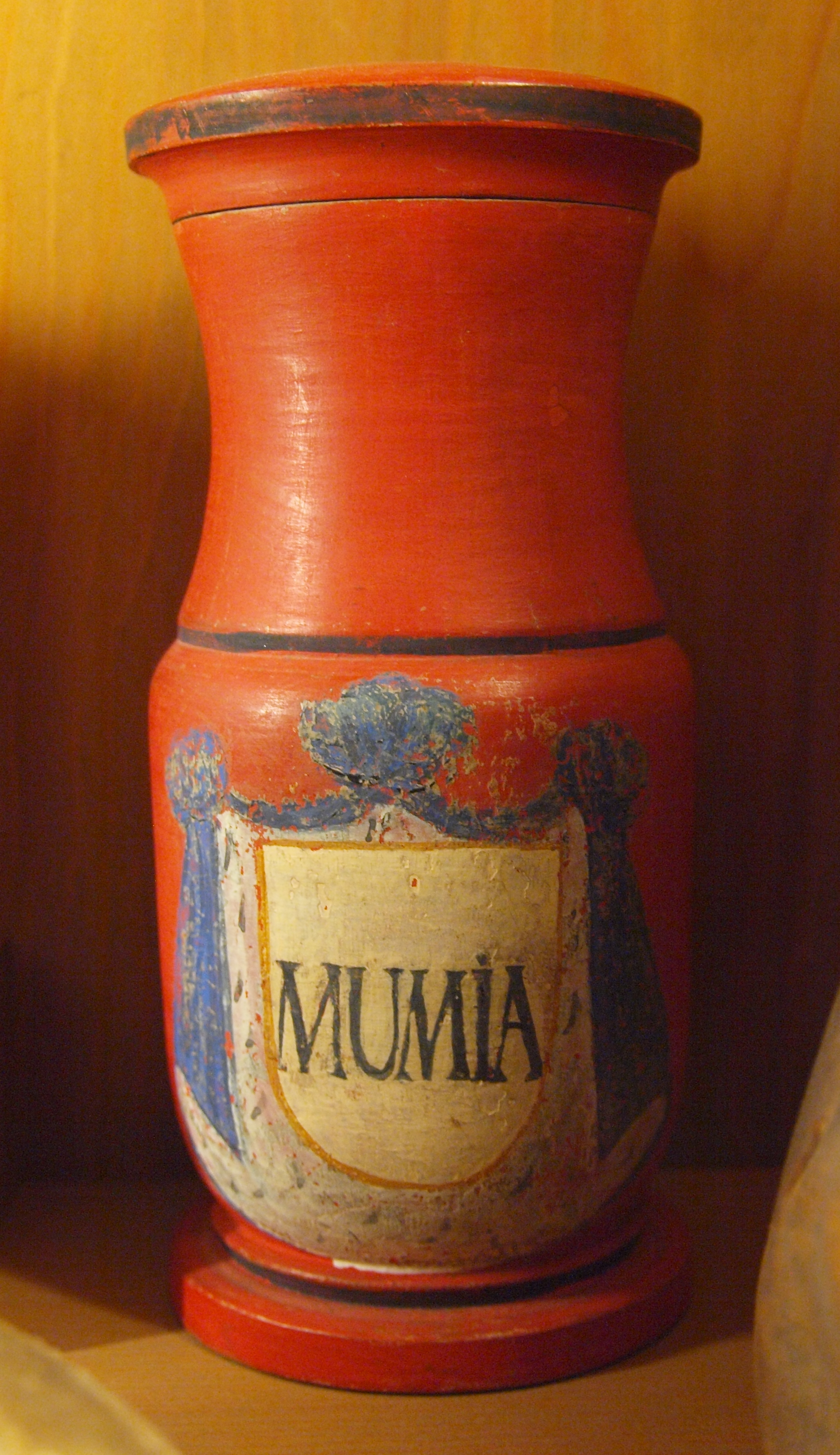
- An 18th century albarello used for storing mummia
  From the 16th century on, an unusual form of medical cannibalism became widespread in several European countries, for which thousands of Egyptian mummies were ground up and sold as medicine. Powdered human mummy – called mummia – was thought to stop internal bleeding and to have other healing properties. The practice developed into a widespread business that flourished until the early 18th century. The demand was much higher than the supply of ancient mummies, leading to much of the offered "mummia" being counterfeit, made from recent Egyptian or European corpses – often from the gallows – instead. In a few cases, mummia was still offered in medical catalogues in the early 20th century.
- In 1563 French settlers from Charlesfort-Santa Elena Site are reported to have resorted to cannibalism while fleeing back to Europe.
- French Catholics ate livers and hearts of Huguenots at the St. Bartholomew's Day massacre in 1572, in some cases also offering them for sale. In Languedoc, Protestants took revenge by destroying the embalmed body of the 11th-century Catholic saint St. Fulcran at the Lodève Cathedral and eating his remains in a dinner mocking the Eucharist. Jean de Léry unfavourably compared these events with the situation in South America, pointing out that the Tupinambá only ate their enemies, while in France family members and neighbours devoured each other because of religious differences.
- During the siege of Sancerre, France, in 1572–1573, some of the starving inhabitants resorted to cannibalism. In one household, Jean de Léry saw the dismembered body of a three-year-old girl; some parts were boiling in a pot on the fire, while others had apparently already been consumed. The girl's mother assured that the child had died of natural reasons.
- The so-called "Werewolf of Dole", Gilles Garnier, was executed in 1573 for strangling four children and eating their flesh.
- German bandit Peter Niers was executed in September 1581 after reportedly confessing to hundreds of murders over the past few years, including the disembowelment of 24 pregnant women followed by the ritual eating of their fetuses in an apparent effort to gain magic powers.
- Peter Stumpp, nicknamed the "Werewolf of Bedburg", was executed in October 1589 after accusations of cannibalism and other crimes.
- Frenchman Jacques Roulet was tried at Angers in 1598 for the murder of a 15-year-old boy named Cornier, having been caught in the act of devouring his corpse. Roulet claimed to be a werewolf and that he had eaten other victims in the past. He was sentenced to death, but the French Parliament at Paris later commuted his sentence to confinement for two years, deeming him to be insane.
- A man allegedly named Nicolas Damont was burned at the stake in 1598 for the murders of 50 children in the French town of Châlons-en-Champagne after their remains were found in his home, including several partially-eaten cuts of human flesh. He admitted to having abducted, killed, and eaten his victims during psychotic episodes but denied accusations by authorities that he had done so while transformed into a werewolf.

=== In China ===
- The following were the famines in China that caused cannibalism, according to the official Twenty-Four Histories.
  - 1504, famine in part of Jiangsu and Anhui. Some people dug out corpses from tombs for food.
  - 1519, again part of Jiangsu and Anhui.
  - 1524, widespread famine in Hubei, Henan, Hebei and Shandong. The roads stank from the corpses lying around.
  - 1552, northern Hebei and Shanxi. The roads stank from the corpses lying around.
  - 1557, eastern Liaoning.
  - 1588, 1591, and 1593, Henan.

== 17th century ==
- A French teenager named Jean Grenier claimed in 1603 that he was a werewolf, confessing that he had killed and eaten various children who had recently gone missing near the town of Saint-Sever. He was found guilty and, due to his young age, sentenced to confinement for life.
- Settlers in colonial Jamestown, Virginia, resorted to cannibalism during a period from 1609 to 1610 known as the Starving Time. After food supplies had diminished, some colonists began to dig up corpses for food. One man confessed under torture to having killed, salted, and eaten his pregnant wife; he was burned alive as punishment. Cannibalism was confirmed in 2013 to have occurred in at least one case: the remains of a teenage girl of about fourteen years were forensically analysed and shown to have telltale marks consistent with butchering meat.
- In 1612, Polish troops stationed in the Moscow Kremlin resorted to cannibalism, in the aftermath of a prolonged siege.
- In 1617, Concino Concini, favourite of the French queen mother Marie de' Medici, was assassinated on the orders of Louis XIII, who sought to rule personally, and parts of his body were reportedly eaten.
- In 1621 in China, the government general killed the representative of the rebel She Chongming (奢崇明) and ate his eyes.
- In 1641 in China, the army of general Fu Zonglong (傅宗龙) ate the corpses of the soldiers of rebel Li Zicheng.
- When provisions ran out during an expedition into Siberia in 1643–1644, a party of Cossacks under Vassili Poyarkov cannibalized the corpses of Siberian aborigines they had previously killed.
- About 1644 in China, general Liu Zeqing (刘泽清) treated guests with human organs after killing prisoners in front of them.
- In Rome in 1644, four butchers were accused of killing seven of their fellow Roman citizens, stripping the meat from their bones, and grinding it together with pork to make sausage, which was then sold from their shop behind the Pantheon.
- On 16 March 1649, French Jesuit missionary Jean de Brébeuf was taken captive with Gabriel Lalemant when the Haudenosaunee destroyed the Huron mission village at Saint-Louis. The Haudenosaunee took the priests to the occupied village of Taenhatenteron (also known as St. Ignace), where they subjected the missionaries and native converts to ritual torture before killing them. As part of the ritual, the Haudenosaunee drank his blood and ate his heart.
- A Polish pamphlet published in 1654 records the trial and execution of Melchior Hedloff, a serial killer and rapist who allegedly confessed to, among other crimes, disembowelling a pregnant woman and then eating her fetus in the belief that consuming the heart of a child would grant him magical powers.
- According to Samuel Clarke's General Martyrology, Catholic troops massacred a considerable number of Protestants in the Piedmontese valleys in April 1655. Clarke asserts that his description of these events, which took place between the first (1651) and second (1660) editions of his book, is based on signed eyewitness accounts of French soldiers. One of them stated that his comrades had eaten "the boiled brains of the Protestants"; both brains and heart of a killed man were fried for consumption, according to another witness. A soldier reported that after a woman was raped, her breasts were cut off and parts of her genitals cut out. They were fried together and served to other unsuspecting soldiers as "tripes". A young girl, aged about ten, was impaled on a pike and roasted alive over an open fire; the soldiers then tried to eat her flesh but found it too poorly roasted. A modern commentator warns that, since "martyrologies are a form of religious polemic ... we shouldn't assume that the atrocities they depict happened" as described in every single case, but also notes that Clarke's book is a stark remainder of the "ingenious capacity of humans to inflict ever more horrible suffering upon their fellows", with massacres and cruel violence being a reality in many wars.
- The French pirate François l'Olonnais reportedly ate the heart of a Spanish prisoner he had captured near Puerto Cavallo in 1667 after the man refused to show him the way to San Pedro Sula. In turn, l'Olonnais was captured in Darién in 1669 by the Kuna tribe, who chopped him to pieces alive before roasting and eating his limbs.
- On 20 August 1672, an Orangist mob lynched and partially ate two prominent anti-monarchist politicians, the grand pensionary of Holland (and de facto prime minister of the Netherlands) Johan de Witt and his brother and political ally Cornelis.
- The following were the famines in China that caused cannibalism, according to the official Twenty-Four Histories.
  - 1601, Fuping County, Hebei.
  - 1616, Shandong province.
  - 1633, Hejian, Hebei.
  - 1634, Shaanxi and Shanxi provinces.
  - 1636, Shanxi province.
  - 1637, Zhejiang province.
  - 1639, Henan province.
  - 1640, widespread famines throughout the two capitals, Beijing and Nanjing, and the provinces of Shandong, Henan, Shanxi and Shaanxi.
  - 1645, part of Hubei province.
  - 1648, part of Guangdong province.
  - 1698, part of Shanxi province.
- The following were the sieges in China that caused cannibalism, according to the Twenty-Four Histories.
  - 1622, siege of Guiyang, Guizhou. Butchers licensed by the state slaughtered people, whose flesh was openly sold in the marketplace. After ten months of siege, only a little over thousand people survived out of the original hundred thousand households in the city.
  - 1631, Linghai, Liaoning.
  - 1654, Xinhui, Guangdong.
  - 1681, Kunming, Yunnan.

== 18th century ==
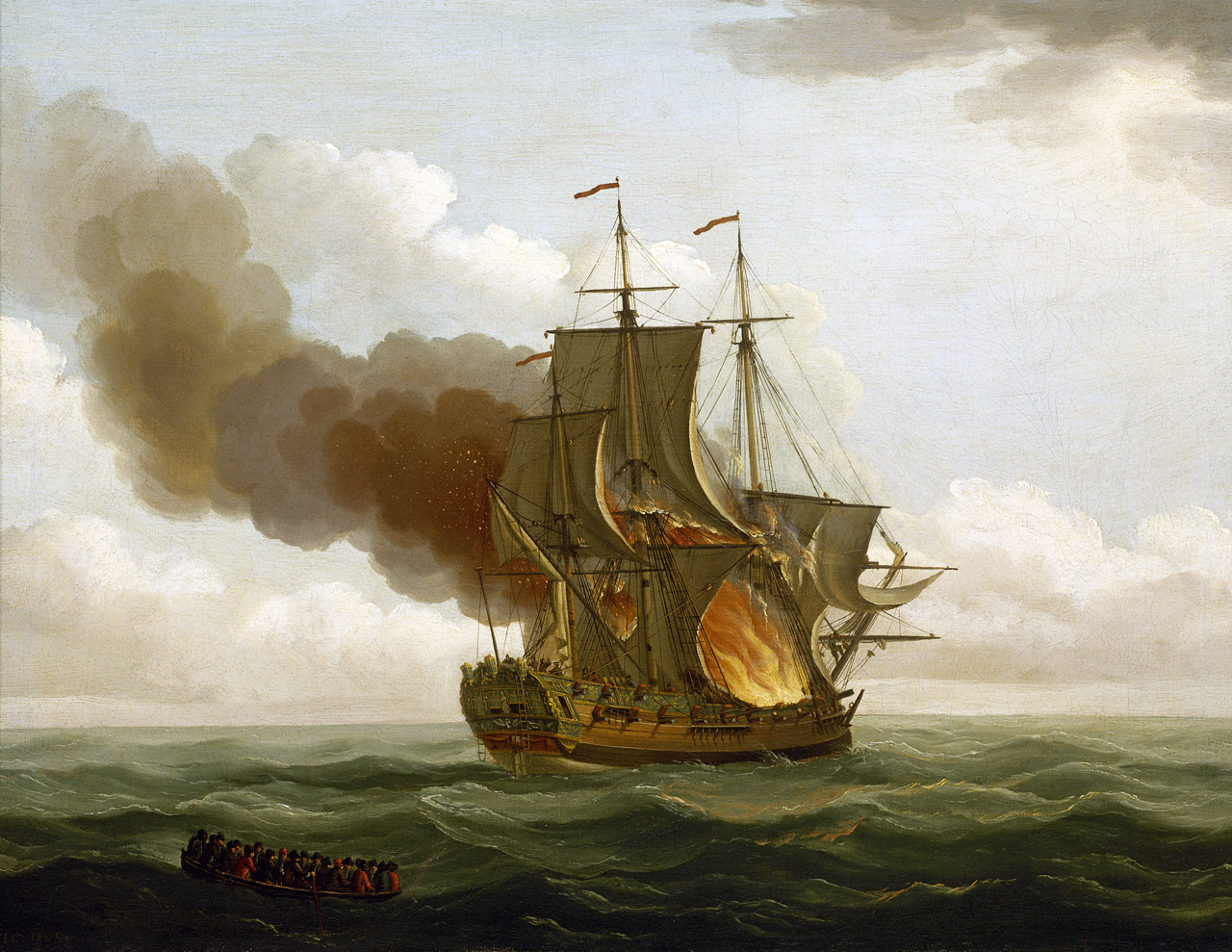
The Luxborough Galley on fire.

- The Akokisa and Atakapa people of modern-day Texas reportedly practised cannibalism.
- During a severe famine in parts of Shandong province, China, in 1703–1704, some people resorted to cannibalism.
- The accounts of the sinking of the Luxborough Galley in 1727 reported cannibalism among the survivors during their two weeks on a small boat in the mid-Atlantic.
- The July 1737 issue of The Gentleman's Magazine contains a sworn account by two sailors, Thomas Thompson (born in Rhode Island) and Simon McCrone (born in Drogheda, Ireland), crew survivors from a slave-carrying ship, the Mary, lost at sea en route from Lisbon to Guinea. Their account covers the period from mid-1735, when they first set sail, to January 1736, when they were rescued. Glanveil Nicholas, master of a schooner, picked them up and landed them in Bridgetown, Barbados, where they gave their disposition. The men described in some detail how the ship sprung a leak; how the slaves were unchained to help pump; how the ship finally sank; how eight men abandoned the ship and how some of them later ate human flesh as a means of surviving before they were rescued.
- After HMS Wager was wrecked off the coast of Patagonia in 1741, some of the surviving crew members stranded on Wager Island resorted to eating the bodies of the dead in order to survive, according to the firsthand account of Midshipman John Byron.
- In June 1752, a group of Ottawa and Chippewa raided a British trade post at Fort Pickawillany. According to newspaper reports, they killed and partially ate at least one English trader and a chief of the Miami people, apparently as an act of revenge and in order to humiliate their enemies.
- When provisions became scarce during the Revolt of the Altishahr Khojas in 1757, Manchu soldiers under Qing general Zhaohui stationed in a barracks in Karasu, Yarkand, started to cook and eat Uyghur Muslims after slaughtering them. When the soldiers caught a married couple, they would first eat the man and gang-rape the woman, who was cooked and eaten the next day.
- In 1761, three famished British soldiers, among them a sergeant, killed and ate an Abenaki boy. The boy's community reacted by pursuing and killing the three men, which in turn led to a British punitive expedition, in which their village was destroyed.
- In 1763, North American Indians performed an act of ritual cannibalism on a British soldier during the Siege of Fort Detroit.
- Chippewa fighters reported celebrated their victory at the Battle of Fort Michilimackinac in 1764 by ritually consuming the bodies of killed enemies.
- In China, a severe famine that started in parts of Shandong province in 1785 and spread to the whole province in the following year caused people to resort to cannibalism.
- French showman and soldier Tarrare (c. 1772 – 1798) was a voracious eater repeatedly caught consuming corpses stolen from a morgue. He was also suspected of having eaten a toddler who disappeared without a trace.
- Polish soldier Charles Domery was a similarly insatiable eater, said to have consumed, among many other things, a considerable number of cats. While he served on a French ship in the 1790s, the leg of another sailor was shot off by cannon fire. Domery grabbed it and began to eat it raw until a crew member wrestled it from him and threw it into the sea.

== 19th century ==
=== 1800s and 1810s ===
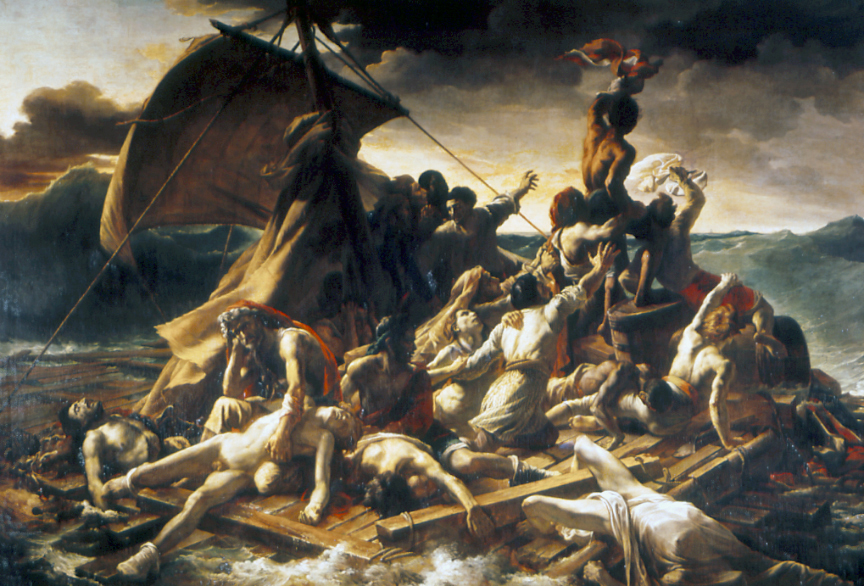
The Raft of the Medusa by Théodore Géricault, 1819

- In an 1809 incident known as the Boyd massacre, about 66 passengers and crew of the Boyd were killed and eaten by Māori on the Whangaroa peninsula, in the north of New Zealand.
- Following the French invasion of Russia in 1812, the ill-fated retreat saw some of Napoleon's soldiers resort to cannibalism when facing starvation in the Russian winter.
- In 1816, the French frigate Méduse ran aground off Mauritania, and 147 passengers and crew took to sea on a hastily constructed raft. In the chaotic 13 days before they were rescued, the occupants of the raft were driven to suicide, murder, and cannibalism; only 15 men survived the experience, five of whom died soon afterwards.

=== 1820s ===
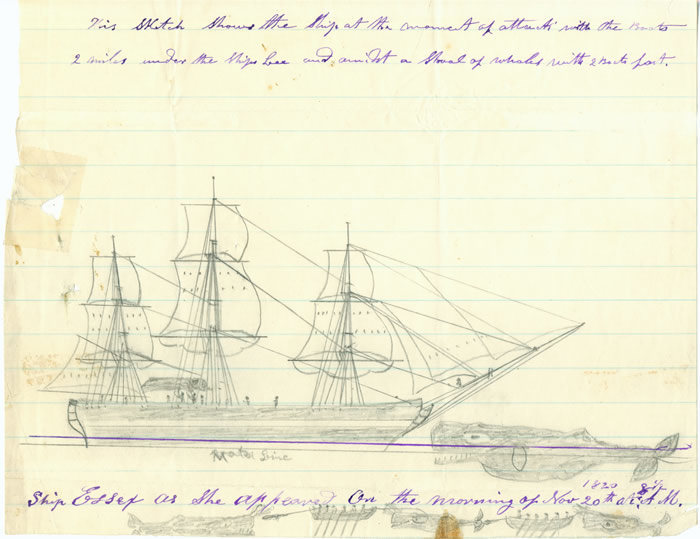
A whale striking the Essex on 20 November 1820, depicted in a sketch by Thomas Nickerson

- The Essex was sunk by a sperm whale in the Pacific Ocean, in 1820. Most survivors of Captain Pollard's ship spent 90 days in small whaling boats before being rescued. Seven of the members who died during that time are documented to have been eaten, some after they died, while two others were sacrificed for that purpose after drawing lots, in agreement with the traditional rules for cannibalism at sea. One of the small boats was found with two survivors sucking on the marrow of a human bone. The tale of the Essex was one of the events that inspired Herman Melville's novel Moby-Dick (1851).
- When the Tunisian traveller Muhammad ben ʿAlī ben Zayn al-ʿĀbidīn visited the Wadai Empire (in today's Chad) around 1820, a local chief sent him a "beautiful" 12-year-old slave boy, together with a knife and a bowl for catching the blood. He explained that the boy was "a gift for you to slaughter and eat". Zayn al-ʿĀbidīn reproached him for eating people, but the chief did not understand his objections. Since the boy had been captured from a hostile tribe, he argued, there was nothing wrong with eating him, adding that especially "a lad with such tender, fresh meat as this one is eaten without delay." The next day, two other chiefs gave Zayn al-ʿĀbidīn two little slave girls as gifts for the same purpose. Instead of slaughtering the three children, he kept them as servants for the rest of his journey and then sold them in Tunis for a good profit.
- In 1822, Alexander Pearce, an Irish convict, led an escape from Macquarie Harbour Penal Settlement in Van Diemen's Land (today Tasmania, Australia). Pearce was captured near Hobart and confessed that he and the other escapees had killed and cannibalized members of their group over a period of weeks, he being the last survivor. Pearce was sent back to Macquarie Harbour, and one year later again escaped into the bush, this time with fellow convict Thomas Cox. Within a few days, Pearce killed Cox and cannibalized him. Pearce was captured again and on 19 July 1824 was hanged at Hobart for the murder of Thomas Cox.
- A French girl named Aimée Debully was raped and murdered by Antoine Léger in 1824. Léger then ate Debully's heart and performed acts of necrophilia on the body.
- In January 1826, bushrangers Thomas Jeffrey, John Perry, and Edward Russell, on the run after escaping from prison in Launceston, Tasmania, began to run out of food while travelling through the bush. After several days, Russell, exhausted from hunger, fell asleep and was killed by Perry. Perry and Jeffrey cut flesh from his thighs, broiled it, and ate it over the next few days. They were captured soon after and on 4 May 1826 both men were executed at Hobart.
- The 27 May 1826 issue of the Acadian Recorder reported that the surviving crew of the ship Francis Mary resorted to cannibalism.
- In 1827 in New Zealand, British painter Augustus Earle tried in vain to prevent the body of a murdered girl from being eaten. While staying in the Bay of Islands for a year, he had hired a 16-year-old Māori girl to take care of his household. Upon spotting the girl, a young man named Atoi claimed her to be a runaway slave and took her away with him. The next day, another European told Earle "that in the adjoining village a female slave ... had been put to death, and that the people were at that very time preparing her flesh for cooking." Earle went there and was horrified to spot the girl's severed head near an earth oven where a man was "preparing the four quarters of a human body for a feast". He went to Atoi, who confirmed that he had shot the girl for "running away from him" and that she would be eaten by him and his friends. Trying to prevent the cannibal meal, Earle fetched a few other white men who helped him to move the "half roasted" quarters of the girl out of the oven into a newly dug grave. But the next day, Te Whareumu, an influential relative of Atoi, rebuked him for doing such a "foolish thing" and pointed out that the girl had nevertheless been cooked and eaten, and indeed Earle found the grave empty upon returning there.

=== 1830s ===
- In 1831, a group of five men escaped from Macquarie Harbour Penal Settlement in Van Diemen's Land (now Tasmania): Richard Hutchinson, Thomas Coventry, Patrick Fagan, Edward Broughton and Matthew McAvoy. A month later, only Broughton and McAvoy were captured. They were charged with being illegally at large while under sentence and sentenced to be hanged. The night before their execution, Broughton made a full confession to Rev. Bedford, admitting that, shortly after their escape, all the men were starving. While Hutchinson was asleep, the others decided to kill him for food; they drew straws to find an executioner. The lot fell to Broughton who killed Hutchinson with an axe. They cut the body to pieces, discarding intestines, hands, feet and head, and eating everything else over the next several days. Then the others decided to kill Coventry, an older man who was sleeping at that time; they killed him together and "all ate heartily" over the next days. Once provisions ran out, McAvoy killed Fagan, whose roasted flesh sustained them for the next days. Four days after the final murder, the two survivors gave themselves up.
- During the 1833 Red Inn murder case, the Martin family, the proprietors of l'Auberge rouge (the Red Inn) in Ardèche, France, allegedly served some of their guests the cooked remains of people they had killed.
- Between 1835 and 1866, members of the Māori cannibalized hundreds during the genocide of the Moriori people on the Chatham Islands. According to lists later assembled by Moriori elders, around 300 men, women, and children were killed – and in many cases eaten – immediately after the invasion. The surviving Moriori population was enslaved; in each of the following years some of the enslaved were killed and consumed. The scholar Edward Tregear was shown a beach at Waitangi where dozens of Moriori women had been impaled for spit-roasting, and he heard of a large feast held by a leading Māori chief in 1836 for which six children had been cooked. After slaughtering Moriori slaves, chiefs used to send some of the flesh to neighbouring groups as a gesture of hospitality. Only 100 Moriori out of an original population of about 1,700 survived this period.
- In New Zealand in the 1830s, a European trader named Anscow saw how a 15-year-old slave girl was killed with a tomahawk in a Māori village, apparently as punishment for having been absent without permission. Her body was then dismembered, the flesh washed in the river, cooked and eaten. The next day, when Anscow moved on, some villagers insisted on accompanying him, carrying "small baskets" of the girl's cooked flesh, which they brought as gifts to a nearby village. The unfortunate girl was one of a considerable number of slaves – most of them women and children – who were murdered and consumed in New Zealand up to the first half of the 19th century, either as punishment for perceived misbehaviours or to provide meat for "festive occasions such as coming-of-age or exhumation ceremonies".
- In 1837, a British cruiser captured the Portuguese schooner Arrogante, which had tried to bring several hundred West African slaves to Cuba, circumventing the British blockade. More than 60 Africans had died of hunger and diseases during the crossing, and the rest were severely undernourished. Many of the survivors reported "that one of the Africans on board the Arrogante had been murdered, and that, subsequently, the sailors had cooked pieces of his body and served them with rice to the rest of the Africans". Half a dozen witnesses had seen "how the Portuguese sailors took Mina behind a sail that they had put up across the deck to stop the rest of the Africans from witnessing what was about to happen". One "who had peeped through the holes in the sail ... described how they cut Mina's throat 'with a long knife'". Several enslaved girls saw how "the flesh of Mina had been cut into small pieces and ... cooked in the big pot destined for the Africans". One of them added "that the sailors had also cooked the liver and heart of Mina in their own smaller pot, and then had eaten those parts themselves", and another witness confirmed this observation.
  The British colonial authorities in Jamaica decided not to press charges against any of the Portuguese sailors, mostly based on the argument that they considered the ship's captain – who was known to have directed at least six slave voyages – too "inoffensive" to be capable "of such a horrible transaction". Historian Manuel Barcia observed that this was not the only case where accusations of "White cannibalism" by Black victims of the Atlantic slave trade were dismissed, and speculated that, "sheltered by distance, isolation, and lawlessness while at sea, other similar instances may have indeed taken place between the sixteenth and the nineteenth centuries".
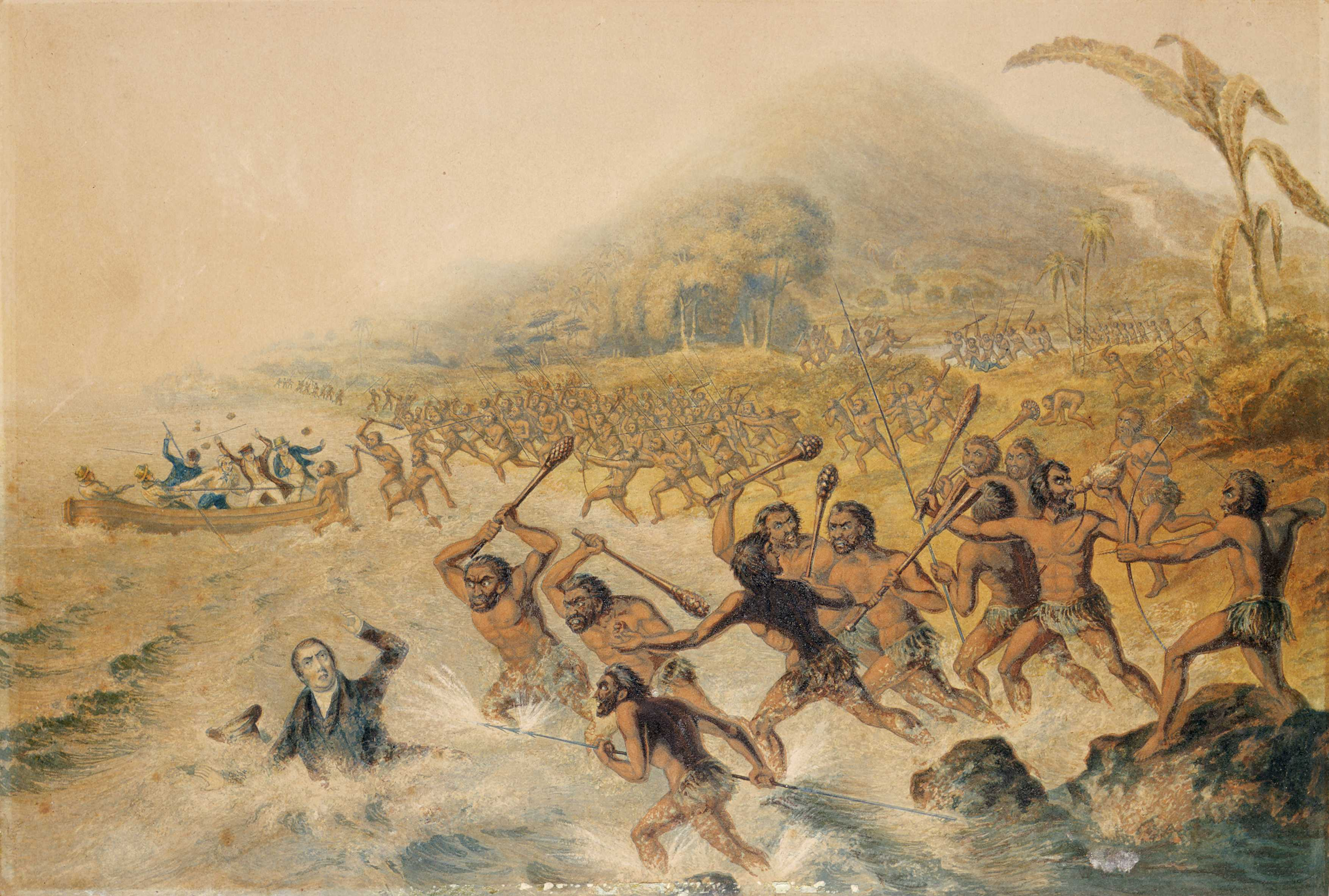
- Massacre of the missionaries John Williams and James Harris in 1839, painted by George Baxter (1841)
  John Williams of the London Missionary Society and a colleague were killed and eaten at Dillon Bay, Erromango Island (today Vanuatu) in 1839.
- Fijian ratu (chief) Udre Udre is believed to be one of history's most prolific cannibals, with different sources attributing between 99 and 999 victims to him before his death in 1840. Guinness World Records identifies him as the world's most prolific cannibal and gives his victim count as 872 to 999. Generally, multiple accounts indicate that in some parts of Fiji human flesh was eaten unhesitatingly and with "relish". In the 1830s, missionaries spoke with people who had been present at feasts where dozens – in some cases up to 50 – "baked human beings" were served and consumed, and they heard from persons they considered credible of even larger such feasts. The usual victims were vanquished enemies, captured foreigners, or slaves purchased from other regions.

=== 1840s ===
- An ex-voto painting at the Sanctuary of Our Lady of Tal-Ħerba in Birkirkara, Malta, dated 29 March 1840 depicts the crew of a ship being massacred in an unknown West African location by pygmies who appear to be cannibals. They are depicted as drinking the blood of three beheaded crew members, while five other people are still alive and awaiting a similar fate. It is unclear if the crew were from a British ship or a Maltese brigantine. The painting was commissioned or possibly painted by Michele Cachia, who might have been the sole survivor, and he attributed his survival to divine intervention.
- The last survivors of Captain Sir John Franklin's lost arctic expedition of 1845 were found to have resorted to cannibalism in their final push across King William Island, Canada, towards the Back River.
- In the 1840s in Sumatra, a Batak raja served the German-Dutch botanist and geologist Franz Wilhelm Junghuhn a soup containing the flesh of freshly slaughtered captives. The host was genuinely surprised to learn that Europeans did not like to eat human flesh, which in Sumatra was widely praised as particularly tasty. At that time, captured enemies and convicted criminals were generally eaten, and some wealthy men bought slaves for fattening and consumption.
- In the United States, the group of settlers known as the Donner Party resorted to cannibalism while snowbound in the Sierra Nevada mountains, for the winter of 1846–1847.
- Liver-Eating Johnson reportedly ate the livers of Crow warriors he had previously slain.
- Clergyman Sabine Baring-Gould, in his 1865 book The Book of Were-Wolves, Being an Account of a Terrible Superstition, recorded an 1849 case in which a vagrant named Swiatek was arrested in the Galician village of Połomia for murdering a 14-year-old girl and eating parts of her body. Swiatek also admitted to having killed and eaten five other people since 1846, although evidence was found of up to fourteen victims. He claimed that he had developed a taste for human flesh three years previously after hunger obliged him to eat the body of a man killed in a tavern fire. Baring-Gould also recorded another case from the same year in which a French graverobber named Bertrand was sentenced to one year's imprisonment after admitting that he had spent the past three years partially devouring corpses he had dug up from Parisian cemeteries.

=== 1850s ===
- Boone Helm, also known as "The Kentucky Cannibal", was an American mountain man, serial killer, and fugitive, who ate human flesh on several occasions between 1850 and 1854, often out of necessity in extreme conditions. He made no secret of the fact and is reported to have said: "Many's the poor devil I've killed, at one time or another – and the time has been that I've been obliged to feed on some of 'em."
- In 1858, a French ship, the Saint Paul, carrying 300 Chinese "coolies" destined for Australia, became shipwrecked on Rossel Island east of New Guinea. According to the testimony of survivors, the majority of the Chinese were killed and eaten by the native islanders over the course of three months.

=== 1860s ===
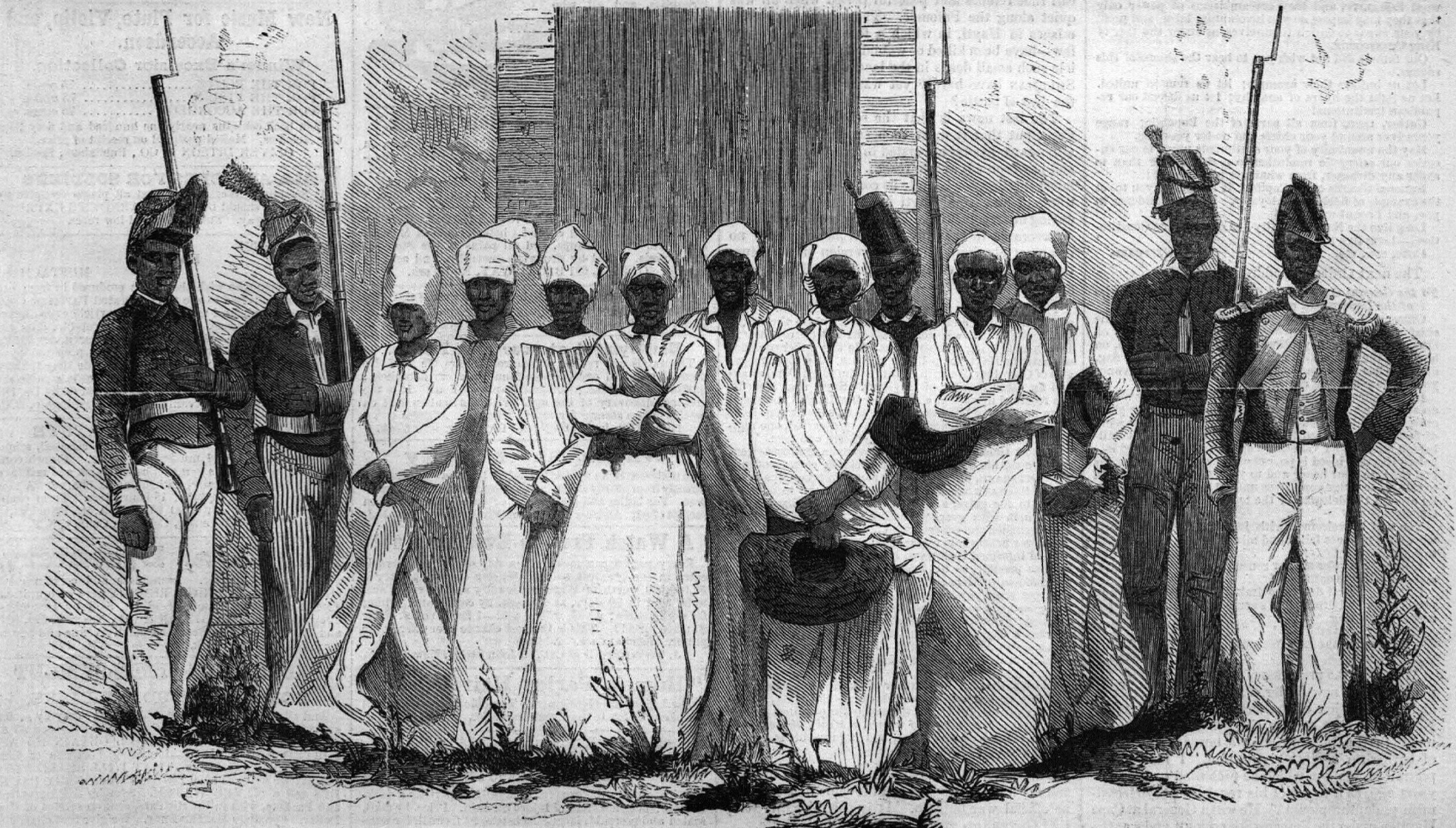
The eight persons found guilty of murdering and eating a girl in a Vodou ritual in Haiti, 1864

- In the United States, ten survivors, found nearly two months after the Utter Party Massacre of 1860 – an attack against a group of emigrants on the Oregon Trail – had eaten five deceased party members.
- The Rua do Arvoredo murders occurred in Porto Alegre, Brazil, between 1863 and 1864. The perpetrators – José Ramos, Catarina Palse, and Carlos Claussner – murdered at least six people inside Ramos's butcher shop in order to steal their belongings, disposing of the bodies by grinding them up into sausages and selling them to unsuspecting customers.
- In February 1864, eight Haitians – four men and four women – were sentenced to death and executed for having murdered and cannibalized a girl in a Vodou ritual held in a village near Port-au-Prince. Accounts of the trial vary regarding the girl's age – reported to range from seven to twelve – but are otherwise largely in agreement. The niece of one of the men was kidnapped while her mother was away, and a few days later "strangled, flayed, decapitated and dismembered" in a sacrificial ritual allegedly held to make her uncle wealthy. Her remains were then cooked and eaten, with some evidence indicating that more than the eight people found guilty might have eaten her flesh. There are two other accounts of cannibalistic Vodou ceremonies by self-claimed eyewitnesses from the 1870s and 1880s, but their reliability is disputed.
- In 1866, a group of Red Lake Chippewa fighting a band of Sioux reportedly celebrated their victory by eating parts of their slain enemies.

=== 1870s ===
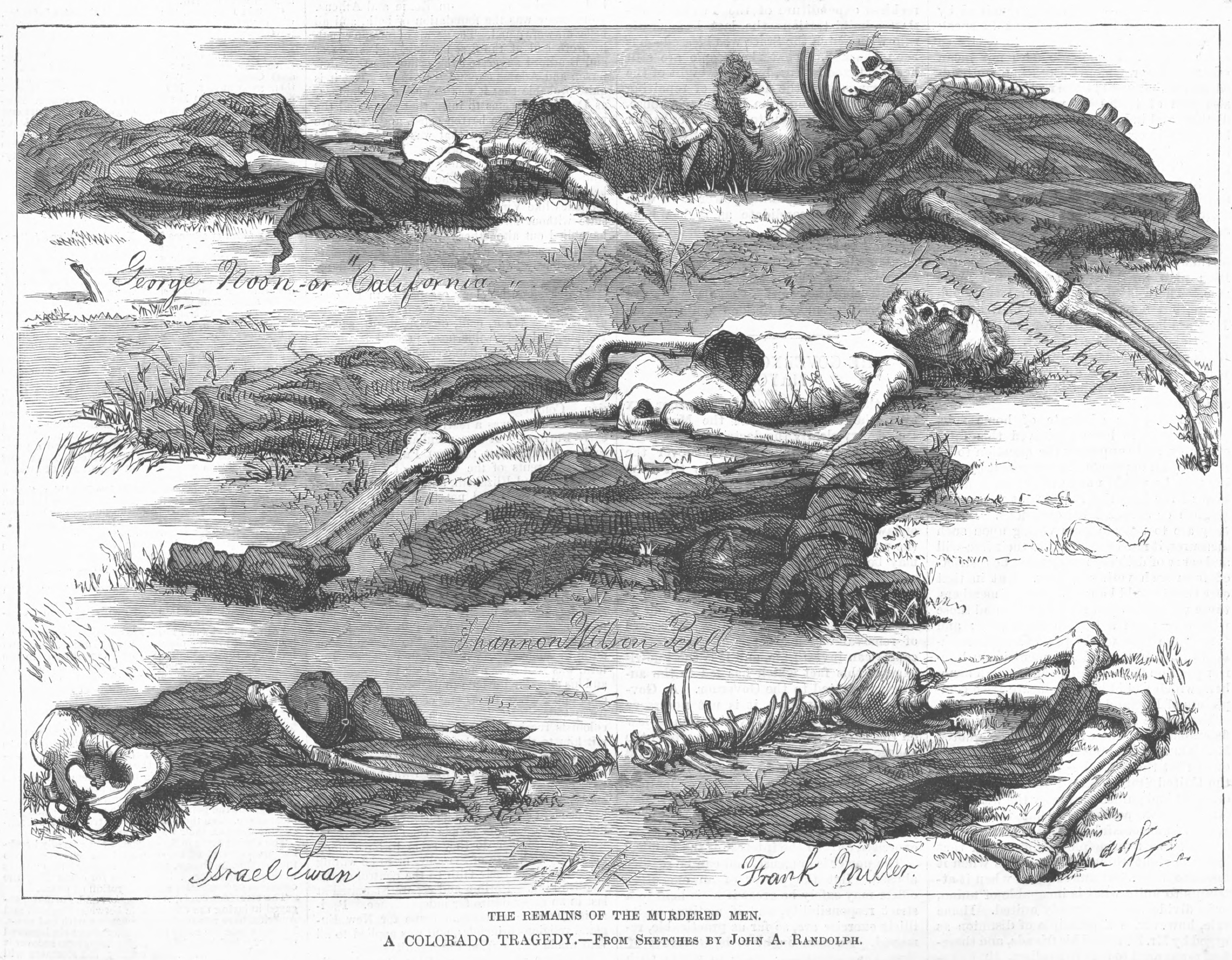
Illustration from Harper's Magazine (1874) of the remains of several men supposedly eaten by Alfred Packer

- Survivors of the British collier Euxine, which had been abandoned in the Atlantic Ocean on 9 August 1874 after catching fire, resorted to cannibalism at sea to survive whilst adrift in a lifeboat on 31 August. Lots were drawn and Italian crewman Francis Shufus drew the short straw, at which point crewman August Muller killed him by cutting off his head and removed his heart and liver, which were eaten by the crew. His torso and limbs were stored in the boat's locker to be eaten later, but this proved unnecessary as they were rescued by a Dutch ship after a few hours and taken to Batavia Road, where they freely admitted their actions to the British consul. Muller and second mate James Archer were charged with murder, but the trial was ultimately abandoned because officials did not believe a jury would convict Archer and Muller for a crime they had committed out of necessity. During the abortive trial the defence suggested that survival cannibalism was a common practice among castaways, with prosecution witness Henry Ellis claiming to have knowledge of at least one prior case and adding: "About twenty or twenty-five years ago these cases were most common."
- In November 1874, three British sailors survived by committing cannibalistic acts in the aftermath of the Cospatrick disaster.
- Alfred Packer was an American prospector who was accused of cannibalism during the winter of 1873–1874. First tried for murder, Packer was eventually sentenced to 40 years in prison after being convicted of manslaughter.
- A Cree man named Swift Runner killed and ate his wife, five of their children (a sixth died from natural causes), his mother, and his brother in Alberta Province, Canada, after running out of food during the winter of 1878. His crime was discovered the following year when the mounted police searched his camp, and survival cannibalism was ruled out as an explanation because the camp was only a few miles from an emergency food station. It is believed Swift Runner was suffering from a mental illness which caused him to believe he was possessed by a Wendigo, a cannibalistic monster from indigenous folklore. He was hanged at Fort Saskatchewan in December 1879.
- In 1878, several groups of visitors were massacred and eaten on Brooker Island (present-day Papua New Guinea), including a crew led by William Bairstow Ingham which had been sent to retrieve the possessions of previous visitors.

=== 1880s ===
- The Flatters expedition of 1880–1881 was a doomed attempt to explore the route of a proposed Trans-Saharan railway from Algeria to the Sudan. Many members of the expedition were massacred by hostile Tuaregs at Bir el-Garama in February 1881. Of the expedition's 93 men, 37 were killed by the Tuaregs, who also seized over 200 camels. The 56 survivors, including four Frenchmen, began a 1,500 kilometres (930 mi) retreat by foot to Ouargla with little food or water. Continuously stalked by the Tuaregs, they resorted to cannibalism on the long retreat through the desert. Only seven of them survived.
- The case of R v Dudley and Stephens (1884) is an English case which dealt with four crew members of an English yacht, the Mignonette, who were cast away in a storm some 1,600 miles (2,600 km) from the Cape of Good Hope. After several days, one of the crew, a 17-year-old cabin boy, fell unconscious due to a combination of starvation and drinking seawater. The others (one possibly objecting) decided to kill and eat him. They were picked up four days later. Two of the three survivors were found guilty of murder. A significant outcome of this case was that necessity was determined to be no defence against a charge of murder.
- In May 1888, the Scottish whiskey heir James Sligo Jameson, while participating in the Emin Pasha Relief Expedition, allegedly paid an associate of the slave trader Tippu Tip to procure a young slave girl who was then killed and eaten in front of them. In his diary, Jameson admitted that he saw the event and made drawings of it, and even that he paid for the girl, but claimed that he considered the whole affair a joke and did not expect her to be actually killed.
  Presently a man appeared, leading a young girl of about ten years old at the hand, and I then witnessed the most horribly sickening sight I am ever likely to see in my life. He plunged a knife quickly into her breast twice, and she fell on her face, turning over on her side. Three men then ran forward, and began to cut up the body of the girl; finally her head was cut off, and not a particle remained, each man taking his piece away down to the river to wash it. The most extraordinary thing was that the girl never uttered a sound, nor struggled, until she fell. Until the last moment, I could not believe that they were in earnest ... that it was anything save a ruse to get money out of me ... When I went home I tried to make some small sketches of the scene while still fresh in my memory, not that it is ever likely to fade from it. No one here seemed to be in the least astonished at it.
  Jameson's diary also shows that he was well informed of cannibal customs and had even seen remains of a cannibal meal, making his line of defence doubtful. The interpreter Assad Farran accused him of having deliberately instigated the murder out of curiosity, and Henry Morton Stanley finally decided to inform the European and American press. The resulting bad publicity likely contributed to the fact that privately organized, non-scientific expeditions into Africa ceased after that time.
- During October 1888, during the investigation of the Whitechapel murders, George Lusk received a letter alongside half a preserved human kidney. The letter's writer claimed to be the serial killer Jack the Ripper, and claimed to have fried and eaten the other half of the kidney.
- Various cases of cannibalism were reported from a huge famine that devastated Ethiopia in 1888–1892, caused by a rinderpest epizootic and unusually hot and dry weather.

=== 1890s ===
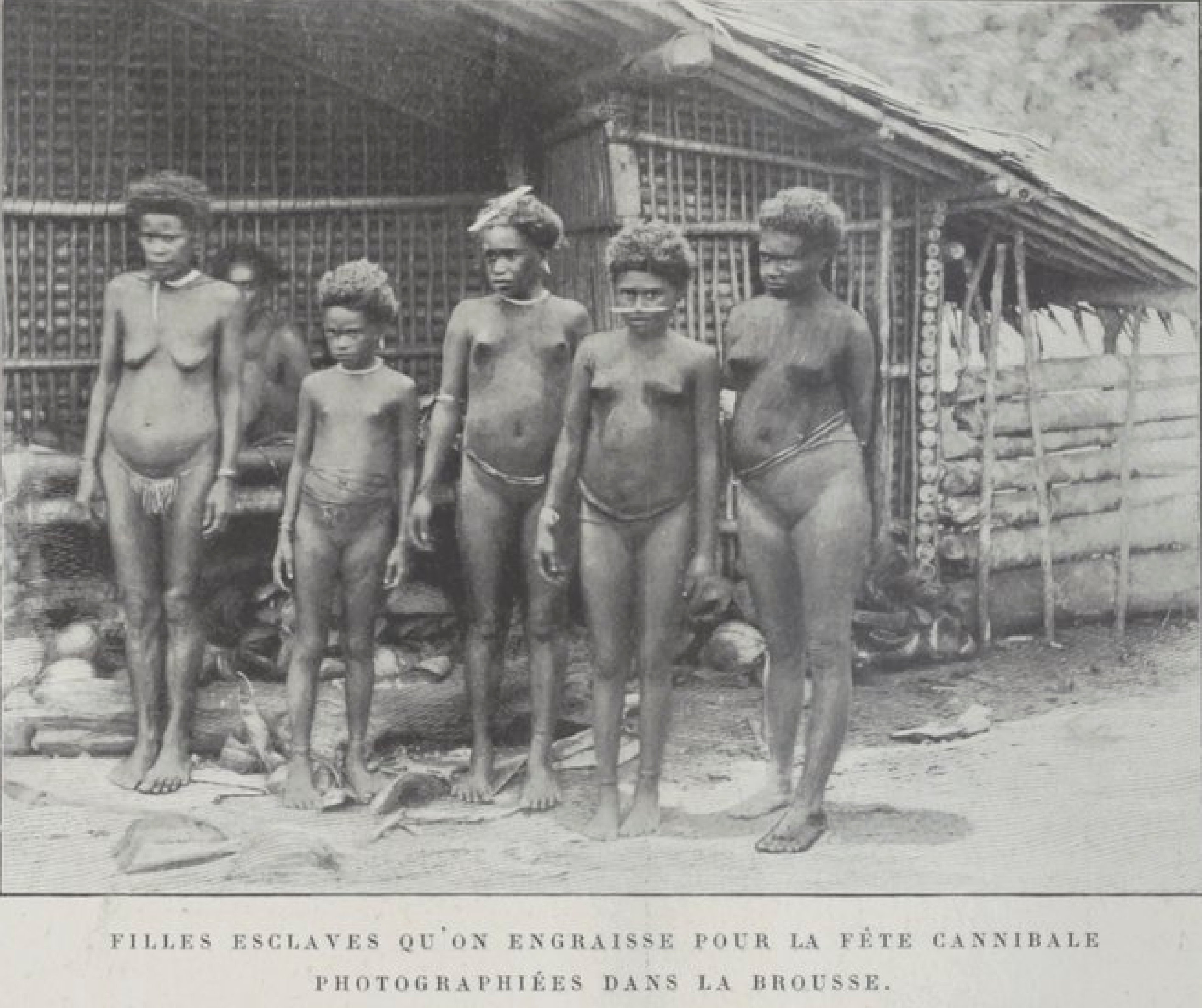
Girls held captive shortly before being killed and eaten at a feast held for Rodolphe Festetics de Tolna on Malaita (Solomon Islands) in the 1890s

- A report dated 28 July 1892 indicates that three people were convicted on charges of cannibalism in the Russian penal colony on Sakhalin. Two songs referencing cannibalism were also recorded among the residents of the colony.
- In the 1890s, five or six young slave women and girls were slaughtered for a cannibal feast held in honour of the French count Rodolphe Festetics de Tolna and his crew on the occasion of their visit to Malaita, one of the Solomon Islands. The count took their photo shortly before they were killed. He does not say whether he ate any of their flesh, but admits to having eaten human flesh on one or two other occasions.
- During the Congo Arab war of 1892–1894, native Batetela troops allied with Belgian commander Francis Dhanis engaged in widespread cannibalism of the bodies of defeated Arab-Swahili soldiers, supposedly eating hundreds in a few days.During the subsequent reign of the Congo Free State, cannibalism was widespread among native soldiers of the Force Publique, with European officials repeatedly turning a blind eye to "cannibal feasts" which followed punitive raids against villages unable to meet their rubber quota. Several accounts indicate that officials handed captives, including infants and elderly women, over to native soldiers or allies, understanding that they would be killed and eaten and that they looked away when slaves were sold as a source of meat. Free State official Guy Burrows once rescued a young slave boy from being killed and served as the principal dish at a banquet planned by his master. Burrows then talked with a colleague who had been aware of the planned banquet but had seen no reason to bother as this custom was practised in many of the surrounding villages.
- In the late 19th century, the German travel writer Stefan von Kotze got himself invited to a cannibal feast in New Ireland, one of the largest islands of the Bismarck Archipelago. The main course was a young woman purchased by the host; Kotze contributed financially to the feast, thus helping to pay for her purchase (and murder). He does not mention whether he saw the woman's death and butchering, but he watched while her flesh was being roasted, some parts in an earth oven and the rest on spits over an open fire. The piece he was served reminded him of "foie gras pâté". According to his own account, seeing it made him feel so nauseous that he did not eat it, though he had intended to do so.
- When travelling through southeastern Guinea in 1899, a German marine lieutenant named Woelffel heard that killed and captured enemies were still frequently eaten. At one place he gifted his hosts a bar of salt to express his gratitude. They immediately slaughtered a girl and ate her body with some of the salt in order to make good use of the gift. The girl, apparently a captive made to work the fields, had become dispensable since the season of field work was over, they explained.
- In 1899, African American Sam Hose was tortured and murdered by a white lynch mob in Coweta County, Georgia. Pieces of Hose's bones were sold for 25 cents, while his heart and liver were cut out to be sold, presumably consumed.

=== China ===
The following were the famines in China that caused cannibalism, according to the Draft History of Qing.

- 1832, Ziyang County, Shaanxi.
- 1833, three counties in Hubei province.
- 1834, two counties in Hubei province.
- 1847, Nanle County, Henan.
- 1857, three counties in Shandong province.
- 1866, Lanzhou, Gansu.
- 1867, Shaanxi and Gansu provinces.
- 1868, two counties in Gansu province.
- 1877, Shanxi and Shaanxi provinces.

== 20th century ==
=== 1900s ===
- The Protestant missionaries James Chalmers and Oliver Fellows Tomkins were murdered and cannibalized on Goaribari Island, Papua New Guinea, on 8 April 1901.
- During the Bailundo revolt of 1902–1904 in Portuguese Angola, a group of Ovimbundu rebels murdered a "particularly hated" merchant named António de Silveira, then roasted and consumed his body. Besides revenge, a goal of the ceremony might have been to produce "success magic" for the rebellion.
- On 27 March 1902, the body of 11-year-old Sosuke Kawai was found in Tokyo, Japan, with his eyeballs gouged out and pieces of flesh from his buttocks missing. His supposed murderer, Otokosaburo Noguchi, who was arrested three years later for an unrelated murder, claimed that he had boiled the boy's muscle tissues and served them in chicken soup to his ill brother-in-law, ostensibly to cure his leprosy.
- Between 1904 and 1909, hundreds of Ottoman immigrants died or disappeared in the Río Negro Province of Argentina. Because law enforcement suspected cannibalistic religious practices of the Mapuche, the case became known as "the Patagonian cannibal murders", but it was never solved.
- The following were the famines in China that caused cannibalism, according to the Draft History of Qing.
  - 1900, Shaanxi province.
  - 1910, Jiangsu and Anhui provinces.

=== 1910s ===
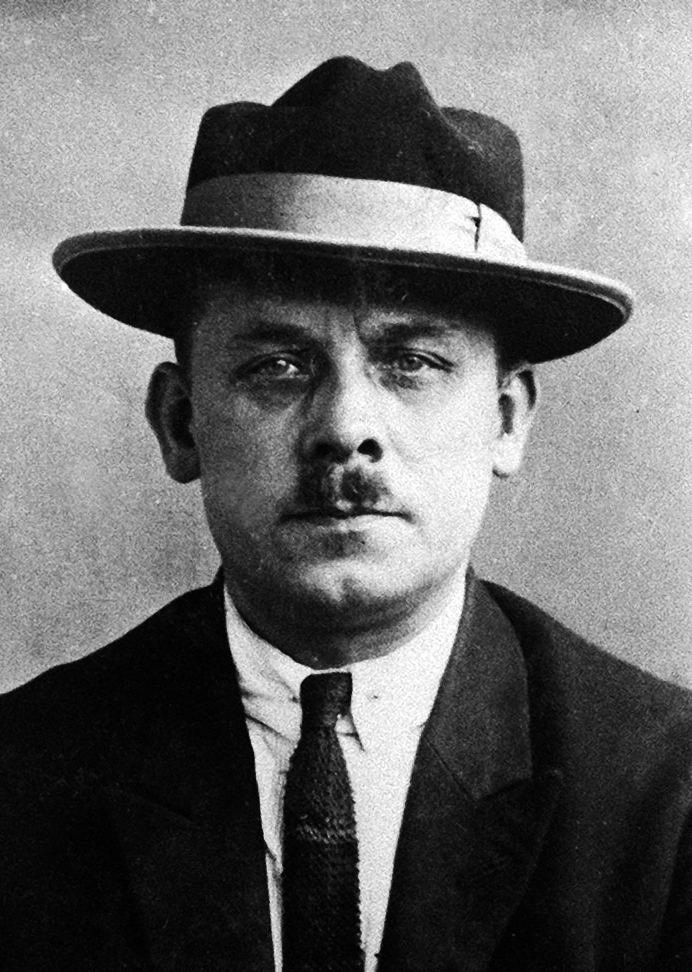
Fritz Haarmann, the "Butcher of Hanover"

- Seven-year-old Bernardo Gonzalez Parra was kidnapped and murdered by Francisco Leona and several others in June 1910 in southeastern Spain. A man named Francisco Ortega had ordered the murder so he could drink the boy's blood and use his body fat as cataplasm, as this was considered a folk cure for tuberculosis.
- An elderly Iraqi couple named Abboud and Khajawa murdered one adult neighbour and more than a hundred young children in Mosul in 1917, then cooked and ate or sold their remains. They blamed their cannibalism on a famine that had been brought about by the inflation of the country's currency. Both were executed that same year.
- The crew members of the US steamship Dumaru spent three weeks adrift in a lifeboat, after the ship exploded and sank in the western Pacific Ocean on 16 October 1918. Quickly exhausting their supply of food and water, they resorted to cannibalism to survive.
- In Germany, Fritz Haarmann, also called the "Butcher of Hanover", sexually assaulted and murdered at least 24 boys, most of them teenagers, between 1918 and 1924. He regularly sold boneless ground meat on the black market and gave different and contradictory explanations about the origin of this meat. Suspicions that this was his way of getting rid of some of the mortal remains of his victims were never definitively confirmed, nor refuted.

=== 1920s ===
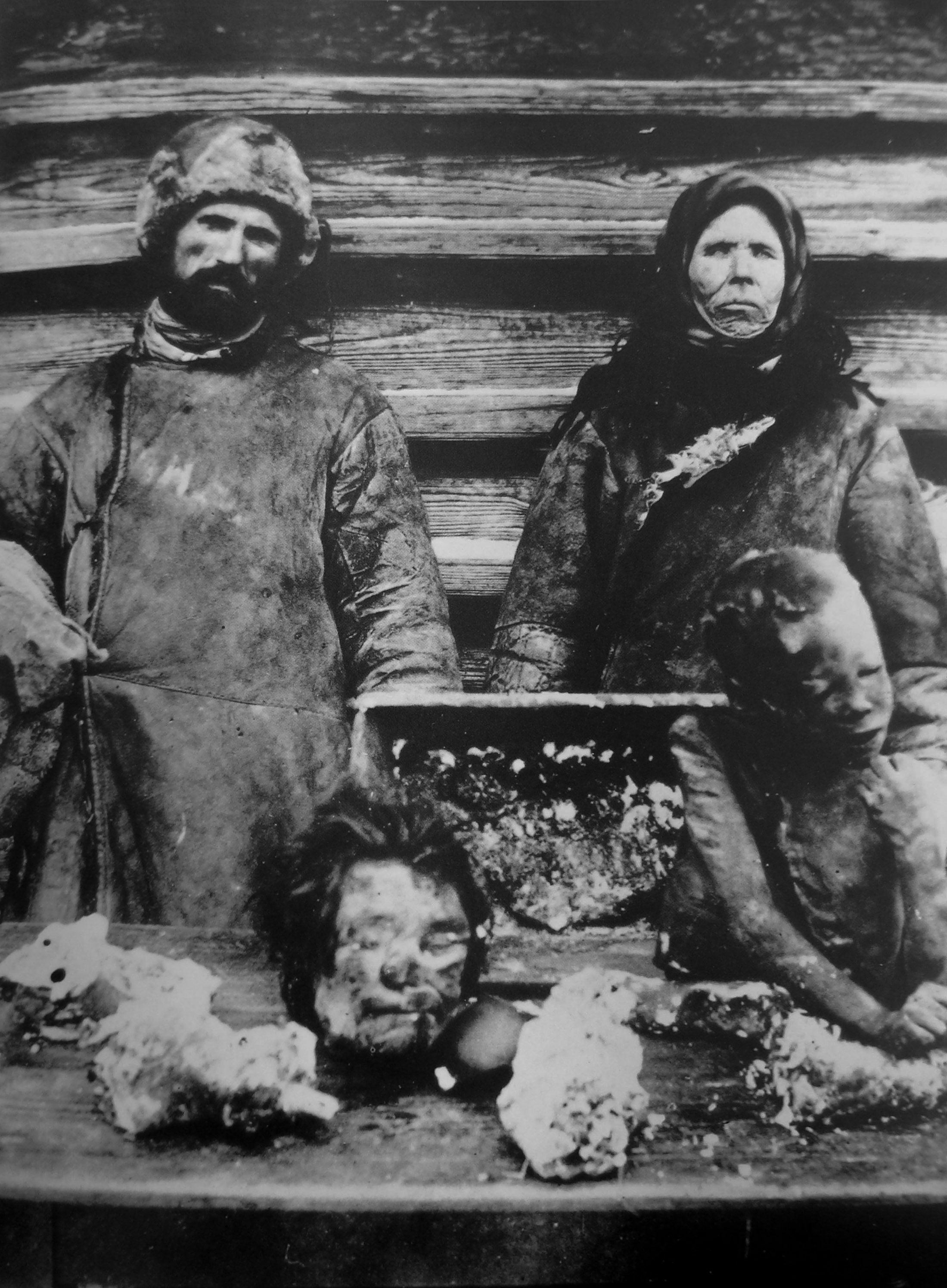
Cannibalism during the Russian famine of 1921–1922

- During the Russian famine of 1921–1922, "thousands of cases" of cannibalism were reported. In Samara, "ten butcher shops were closed for selling human flesh." In Pugachyov, "it was dangerous for children to go out after dark since there were known to be bands of cannibals and traders who killed them to eat or sell their tender flesh." An inhabitant of a nearby village stated: "There are several cafeterias in the village — and all of them serve up young children." The historian Orlando Figes estimates "that a considerable proportion of the meat in Soviet factories in the Volga area ... was human flesh", often from kidnapped children. Russian writer Aleksandr Solzhenitsyn describes the famine as the worst in centuries, even worse than the Russian famine of 1601–1603 during the Time of Troubles.
- After Karl Denke was arrested on 21 December 1924, German authorities found pieces of cured human flesh in his home, along with a list of more than 30 people he had previously killed and cannibalized.
- On 19 December 1926, fisherman Eli Kelly washed up on Santa Catalina Island (California) after being lost at sea for 11 days. He had partially subsisted on the flesh of his fishing companion James McKinley who died naturally (of dehydration or starvation) during the ordeal.
- Between July 1924 and June 1928, the American serial killer Albert Fish murdered at least three children, afterwards roasting and eating their flesh. "How sweet and tender her little ass was roasted in the oven", he wrote about one of his victims, ten-year-old Grace Budd, adding that "It took me 9 days to eat her entire body". Another of his victims, four-year-old Billy Gaffney, he confessed to having eaten completely "in about four days", cooking the meat with "onions, carrots, turnips, celery, salt and pepper". He described the boy's "sweet fat little behind" as far tastier than "any roast turkey". Psychiatrist Fredric Wertham stated that Fish's account of the culinary process was "like a housewife describing her favorite methods of cooking. You had to remind yourself that this was a little girl he was talking about." Fish claimed that a friend had introduced him to cannibalism after getting used to eating children's flesh during a severe famine in Hong Kong in the 1890s, though the police could not verify this.

=== 1930s ===
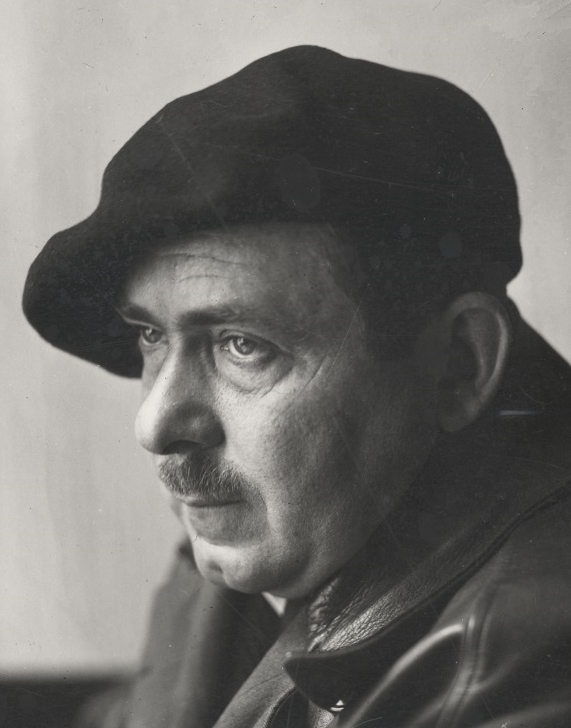
William Seabrook ate human flesh to study its taste

- Before 1931, New York Times reporter William Seabrook, allegedly in the interests of research, obtained from a hospital intern at the Sorbonne a chunk of human meat from the body of a healthy man killed in an accident, then cooked and ate it. He reported:
  It was like good, fully developed veal, not young, but not yet beef. It was very definitely like that, and it was not like any other meat I had ever tasted. It was so nearly like good, fully developed veal that I think no person with a palate of ordinary, normal sensitiveness could distinguish it from veal. It was mild, good meat with no other sharply defined or highly characteristic taste such as for instance, goat, high game, and pork have. The [rump] steak was slightly tougher than prime veal, a little stringy, but not too tough or stringy to be agreeably edible. The [loin] roast, from which I cut and ate a central slice, was tender, and in color, texture, smell as well as taste, strengthened my certainty that of all the meats we habitually know, veal is the one meat to which this meat is accurately comparable.
  Seabrook might have eaten human flesh also on another occasion. Originally he had implied that he had eaten it during a trip to West Africa, and when this claim turned out wrong (and he had not yet dared reveal the hospital story), he was much mocked for it. According to his autobiography, the wealthy socialite Daisy Fellowes one day invited him to one of her garden parties, stating "I think you deserve to know what human flesh really tastes like". During the party, which was attended by about a dozen guests (some of them well-known), a piece of supposedly human flesh was grilled and eaten with much pomp. Seabrook comments that, while he never found out "the real truth" behind this meal, it "looked and tasted exactly" like the human flesh he had eaten before.
- Cannibalism was widespread during the Holodomor, a huge famine in Ukraine in 1932 and 1933; multiple instances were reported from Ukraine, the Volga region, South Siberia, and Kuban during the Soviet famine of 1930–1933. The historian Timothy Snyder writes:
  Survival was a moral as well as a physical struggle. A woman doctor wrote to a friend in June 1933 that she had not yet become a cannibal, but was 'not sure that I shall not be one by the time my letter reaches you'. The good people died first. Those who refused to steal or to prostitute themselves died. Those who gave food to others died. Those who refused to eat corpses died. Those who refused to kill their fellow man died ... At least 2,505 people were sentenced for cannibalism in the years 1932 and 1933 in Ukraine, though the actual number of cases was certainly much higher.
- Cannibalism also occurred in the parallel famine in Kazakhstan, which was another part of the widespread Soviet famine of 1930–1933. Some of the starving consumed corpses, while others committed murders in order to get meat. Villagers "discovered people among them who ate body parts and killed children" and a survivor remembered how he repeatedly saw "a little foot float[ing] up, or a hand, or a child's heel" in cauldrons boiling over a fire.
- On 4 November 1932, Soeleman, a prisoner in the Boven-Digoel concentration camp in the Dutch East Indies, was reportedly killed and eaten, possibly by other prisoners.
- In May 1933, about 6,700 Soviet prisoners were deported to a Siberian island and there abandoned with scant supplies and virtually no clothing, shelter, or tools, resulting in widespread disease, violence, and cannibalism. This episode became known as the Nazino tragedy, after the name of the island.
- On 9 December 1934, grave robber and suspected serial killer Alonzo Robinson was arrested for the axe-slaying of a couple in their Cleveland, Mississippi home. Salted and cured portions of the woman's flesh, with bite marks, were found in his pockets.
- An Italian woman named Leonarda Cianciulli killed three women in 1939 and 1940, turning their bodies into teacakes which she fed to others as well as consumed herself.

=== 1940s ===
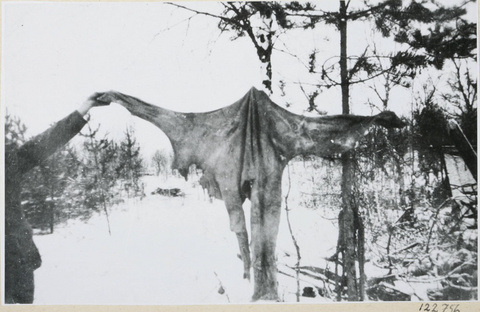
Finnish soldiers show the skin of Soviet soldiers eaten by members of a Soviet patrol during the Continuation War.

- Members of the Leopard Society, centred in Sierra Leone, Liberia, and Côte d'Ivoire, reportedly engaged in cannibalism until the 1940s.
- There are eyewitness accounts of cannibalism during the Siege of Leningrad (1941–1944), including reports of people cutting off and eating their own flesh.
- In November 1942, Finnish soldiers discovered the remains of a Soviet partisan, butchered and eaten by his comrades near Lake Segozero.
- Following the German surrender at the Battle of Stalingrad in January and February 1943, roughly 100,000 German soldiers were taken prisoner of war (POW). Almost all of them were sent to POW camps in Siberia or Central Asia where, due to being chronically underfed by their Soviet captors, many resorted to cannibalism.
- A number of oral accounts suggest that cannibalism due to a lack of food was practised during the Japanese occupation of Hong Kong (1941–1945) in World War II. The superintendent of Kowloon Hospital remembered that corpses were often brought to the morgue with their "fleshy parts – thighs, buttocks, calves" missing. Provisions also became very scarce in nearby Macau due to the large number of refugees settling in the city. Much of the "pork" that was sometimes offered in local markets was rumoured to be of human origin. A Portuguese woman once saw "the deboned face of a Chinese child" in a split-bamboo basket at a wet market, reminding her of the pig faces commonly sold for eating.
- Cannibalism took place in the concentration and death camps in the Independent State of Croatia (NDH), a Nazi German puppet state which was governed by the fascist Ustasha organization, who committed the genocide of Serbs and the Holocaust in NDH. Several survivors testified that some Ustashas drank the blood from the slashed throats of the victims.
- The Australian War Crimes Section of the Tokyo War Crimes Tribunal, led by prosecutor William Webb, collected numerous written reports and testimonies that documented Japanese soldiers' acts of cannibalism among their own troops, on enemy dead, and on Allied prisoners of war in many parts of the Greater East Asia Co-Prosperity Sphere. In September 1942, Japanese daily rations in New Guinea consisted of 800 grams of rice and tinned meat. However, by December, this had fallen to 50 grams. According to historian Yuki Tanaka, "cannibalism was often a systematic activity conducted by whole squads and under the command of officers". In some cases, flesh was cut from living people. An Indian POW, Lance Naik Hatam Ali, testified that in New Guinea
  the Japanese started selecting prisoners and every day one prisoner was taken out and killed and eaten by the soldiers. I personally saw this happen and about 100 prisoners were eaten at this place by the Japanese. The remainder of us were taken to another spot 50 miles [80 km] away where 10 prisoners died of sickness. At this place, the Japanese again started selecting prisoners to eat. Those selected were taken to a hut where their flesh was cut from their bodies while they were alive and they were thrown into a ditch where they later died.
- Another well-documented case occurred in Chichijima in February 1945, when Japanese soldiers killed and consumed five American airmen. This case was investigated in 1947 in a war crimes trial, and of 30 Japanese soldiers prosecuted, five (among them General Yoshio Tachibana) were found guilty and hanged.
- In early 1945, Japanese soldiers gave Korean forced labourers on Mili Atoll, Marshall Islands, "whale meat" to consume, which was actually human flesh from other dead Koreans. Upon realizing what had occurred, the enraged Koreans staged a rebellion that was eventually put down, which resulted in around 55 deaths.

=== 1950s ===
- In 1950, a Belgian administrator ate a "remarkably delicious" dish in the Belgian Congo, with his hosts afterwards revealing that "the meat came from a young girl" rather than a porcupine, as he had initially thought. A few years later, a Danish traveller and his porters enjoyed in a north-Congolese village a "tasty stew" made with the "soft and tender" flesh of a slaughtered woman, as they found out when asking about the origin of the meat afterwards.
- In Nyasaland (today Malawi) in the 1950s, two "well-fattened" children were offered to a European shopping for a Christmas roast.
- German serial killer Joachim Kroll, nicknamed the "Duisburg Man-Eater", practised cannibalism from the mid-1950s until his arrest more than 20 years later, murdering probably more than a dozen women and girls. When he was arrested, parts of the body of four-year-old Marion Ketter, his last victim, were in his freezer, while a small hand was cooking in a pan of boiling water.
- Anthropologist Tobias Schneebaum recounted participating in cannibalism while living with the Arakmbut people of the Peruvian Amazon for seven months in 1955. Schneebaum wrote in his 1969 book Keep the River on Your Right that he had been invited on what he thought was a hunting expedition, only to find that it was in fact a raid on a nearby village in which every male of the opposing tribe was killed, cut up, cooked, and then eaten. He described how one of the Arakmbut accompanying him had cut a heart into pieces and fed him some of it: "[he] bit into it as if it were an apple, taking a large bite, almost half the heart, and chewed down several times, spit it into his hand, separated the meat into six sections, and placed some into the mouths of each of us. We chewed and swallowed."
- A tradition of ritualistic cannibalism among the Fore people caused a kuru epidemic, leading to approximately 1000 deaths between 1957 and 1961, and thousands more in the subsequent decades.
- Thousands of cases of cannibalism are associated with the Great Chinese Famine of 1959 to 1961 that chiefly resulted from the Great Leap Forward. While the government downplays the events and treats the famine as a natural rather than a human-made disaster, the journalists Yang Jisheng and Jasper Becker provide many detailed reports in their books Tombstone and Hungry Ghosts. One victim, Dong Jianyi, a Harvard University alumnus, died of starvation at the Jiabiangou "Re-education through labor" farm in Jiuquan, Gansu. A few days after his death, other prisoners found his clothes and blanket ripped from his corpse. His naked corpse showed signs of cannibalization; specifically, the flesh on his buttocks and calves had been carved away by a knife.

=== 1960s ===
- In 1961 in Uganda, the anthropologist Robert B. Edgerton (author of Sick Societies) was offered smoked human fingers as well as "a smoked slab of a young woman's buttocks, a truly 'choice cut'", according to the seller.
- In October 1961, Asmat people supposedly killed and ate Michael Rockefeller while he was exploring in the south of Dutch New Guinea.
- In the summer of 1963, Josef Kulík from Czechoslovakia (at that time serving compulsory military service) killed two young boys in a railway wagon. He cut their bodies open, roasted some of their internal organs on a fire, and ate them. He used some old funeral wreaths he had found near the wagon for fuel.
- The Wari' people practised endocannibalism, specifically mortuary cannibalism, until the 1960s.
- Factional violence and cannibalism occurred in the Guangxi region of southeast China in 1968, during the Cultural Revolution (1966–1976).

=== 1970s ===
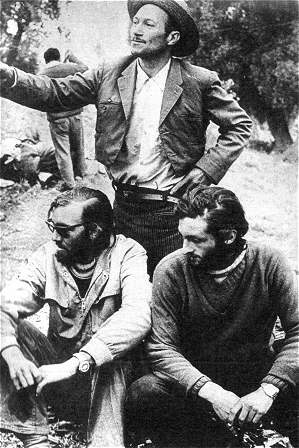
Nando Parrado and Roberto Canessa (both sitting), two survivors of Uruguayan Air Force Flight 571

- On 13 July 1970, police arrested Stanley Baker on charges of killing and cannibalizing a Montana, US, resident.
- A Mexican woman named María Trinidad Ramírez Poblano murdered her abusive husband on 20 July 1971 and cooked his remains into tamales which she then served to her neighbours.
- In 1972, Uruguayan Air Force Flight 571 crashed on a glacier in Argentina at 3,570 metres (11,710 ft) altitude. They had only eight chocolate bars, a tin of mussels, three small jars of jam, a tin of almonds, a few dates, candies, dried plums, and several bottles of wine which they made last a week. Eight days after the crash on 13 October 1972, they learned that the search had been terminated. The remaining survivors, including the rugby team from Stella Maris College in Montevideo and some of their family members and other passengers, mutually agreed to cannibalism. They were rescued after 72 days on 22 December. The story of the survivors was chronicled in Piers Paul Read's 1974 memoir, Alive: The Story of the Andes Survivors (1974), in a film adaptation titled Alive (1993), and in various other books and films.
- Also in 1972, at the same time as the Andean incident, Marten Hartwell crashed his aircraft near the Arctic Circle in Canada's Northwest Territories. The three passengers died in the month it took searchers to find them, but Hartwell survived by eating part of one body.
- Between 1970 and 1973, Lester Harrison raped and murdered between four and six women in Chicago's Grant Park area. After his arrest, he confessed that he had cut off a piece of flesh from one of the victims' bodies, which he brought back to his home and ate.
- In December 1973 during the Yom Kippur War, Syrian defence minister Mustafa Tlass awarded the Medal of the Republic to one Syrian soldier who, he said, had executed 28 Israeli prisoners with an axe and then eaten the flesh of one: "He did not use the military weapon to kill them but utilized the ax to decapitate them. He then devoured the neck of one of them and ate it in front of the people. I am proud of his courage and bravery, for he actually killed by himself 28 Jews by count and cash."
- American serial killer Carroll Cole allegedly cannibalized an unidentified woman in Oklahoma City on Thanksgiving Day 1977. In Cole's account of the crime he said that he did not remember the actual murder, but had woken up the following day to find the victim's body parts strewn across his apartment, including some pieces partially eaten on the table and others cooking on the stove, surmising that he must have killed, cooked, and eaten her the previous night.
- In 1977 and 1978, the "Vampire of Sacramento" Richard Chase ate parts of his victims and drank their blood to treat his imaginary illnesses.
- On 20 August 1979, Albert Fentress lured, killed and cannibalized an 18-year-old high school student.
- Jean-Bédel Bokassa, leader of the Central African Republic, was accused of cannibalism after being overthrown in a coup d'état in September 1979. At Bokassa's trial in 1985, his successor, David Dacko, testified that butchered bodies had been found in the freezer at Bokassa's palace after the 1979 coup, while Bokassa's personal chef testified that he had cooked human flesh and served it to Bokassa. Paris Match magazine published photographs of frozen children's corpses stored in a refrigerator at the palace, and Bokassa himself allegedly told the French ambassador at his coronation in 1977 that he had served him human meat on a previous occasion. The cannibalism charges had become moot under a 1981 general amnesty, so the court reached no verdict on them, but found Bokassa guilty on twenty other charges.
- From 1979 to 1980, Nikolai Dzhumagaliev killed at least seven women and cannibalized their corpses in Soviet Kazakhstan.
- In November 1979, Erik Gyllenfjäder murdered and dismembered his girlfriend Katarina Jakobsson in Malmö, Sweden. He disposed of her flesh by consuming several kilograms of it in meals with red wine and rice, macaroni, and potatoes.

=== 1980s ===
- In March 1980, Swazi businesswoman Philippa Mdluli murdered the young daughter of one of her employees at the restaurant she owned in Mbabane. Mdluli subsequently mutilated the girl's body as part of a muti ritual and served it to patrons at the restaurant. Before the girl's murder, Mdluli was known to have been involved in other acts of cannibalism. She was the last person to be executed by Eswatini on 2 July 1983.
- Eight-year-old Tiffany Papesh was abducted in Maple Heights, Ohio on 2 July 1980. Brandon Flagner, the man convicted of her murder, later told the FBI that he had dismembered her and eaten parts of her body after killing her, although his confession has been disputed.
- On 11 June 1981, Issei Sagawa murdered a Dutch woman named Renée Hartevelt by shooting her in the neck with a rifle in his home in Paris. After having sex with the corpse, he began to eat parts of it, starting with the buttocks and thighs. A few days later, he was discovered while attempting to dump the mutilated body into a lake and subsequently arrested. At his trial in France, he was found to be legally insane and ordered to be held indefinitely in a mental institution. Soon afterwards, Japanese author Inuhiko Yomota published his memoirs, including a detailed account of the murder. The book was a bestseller and Sagawa became a minor celebrity. A short while later he was extradited to Japan, where mental health professionals announced that he was perfectly sane. Because the French authorities did not hand the court documents over to Japan, he was not tried again but instead released in 1986. He moved to Tokyo, where he made a living as a freelance writer.
- Ladislav Hojer, a serial killer from Czechoslovakia, confessed to killing a young woman in 1981. He cut off her breasts and vulva and tried to eat the latter with mustard, after boiling it in salty water. He later admitted he had thrown part of it away because of its underwhelming taste.
- Lam Kor-wan killed and dismembered Leung Sau-wan, a 29-year-old street cleaner, in Hong Kong on 17 June 1982 before attempting to eat her intestines, ultimately vomiting them up due to the taste.
- Michael Woodmansee was convicted in 1983 of kidnapping and killing 5-year-old Jason Foreman in 1975 in South Kingstown, Rhode Island. According to the victim's father, Woodmansee wrote in his journal that he ate the boy's flesh.
- In April 1986, a married couple in Beijing killed a teenage boy. They then ate his flesh, also sharing some of it with their neighbours, who were told it was camel meat. After their arrest, they confessed to two prior murders of young men likewise followed by cannibalism. They stated they had gotten used to eating human flesh during a time of starvation and had murdered out of a longing for its taste.
- In May 1986, American Hadden Clark killed and cannibalized 6-year-old Michelle Dorr.
- In November 1986, American Gary M. Heidnik abducted six women. After one of the women died, he allegedly fed the other victims a combination of dog food and human flesh.
- In May 1988, a motorized junk with 110 Vietnamese refugees on board, headed for Malaysia, suffered engine damage and drifted helplessly in the South China Sea. After 28 days on a vessel that had loaded provisions for only five days, the survivors started to eat the bodies of those who had died. Two passengers, a man around 30 and a 12-year-old boy, were murdered to be eaten, and two others may have been killed for the same reason. Some days later the ship was finally rescued and brought to the Philippines. Less than half of the persons on board had survived. Since the Philippine authorities did not investigate the murders, which had been committed in international waters, none of the survivors faced legal consequences despite two confessions.
- Arthur Shawcross murdered eleven women between 1988 and 1990 in Rochester, New York. In at least three of these cases he sliced out and ate the victim's vulva. He also claimed at one time to have eaten the genitals of his first victim, Jack Blake, whom he killed in 1972, but would later refuse to discuss this claim.
- Tsutomu Miyazaki murdered 5-year-old Ayaka Nomoto on 6 June 1989 in Saitama Prefecture. Over the next few days he sexually abused and ultimately dismembered her corpse before drinking the blood from her hands, which he then ate.
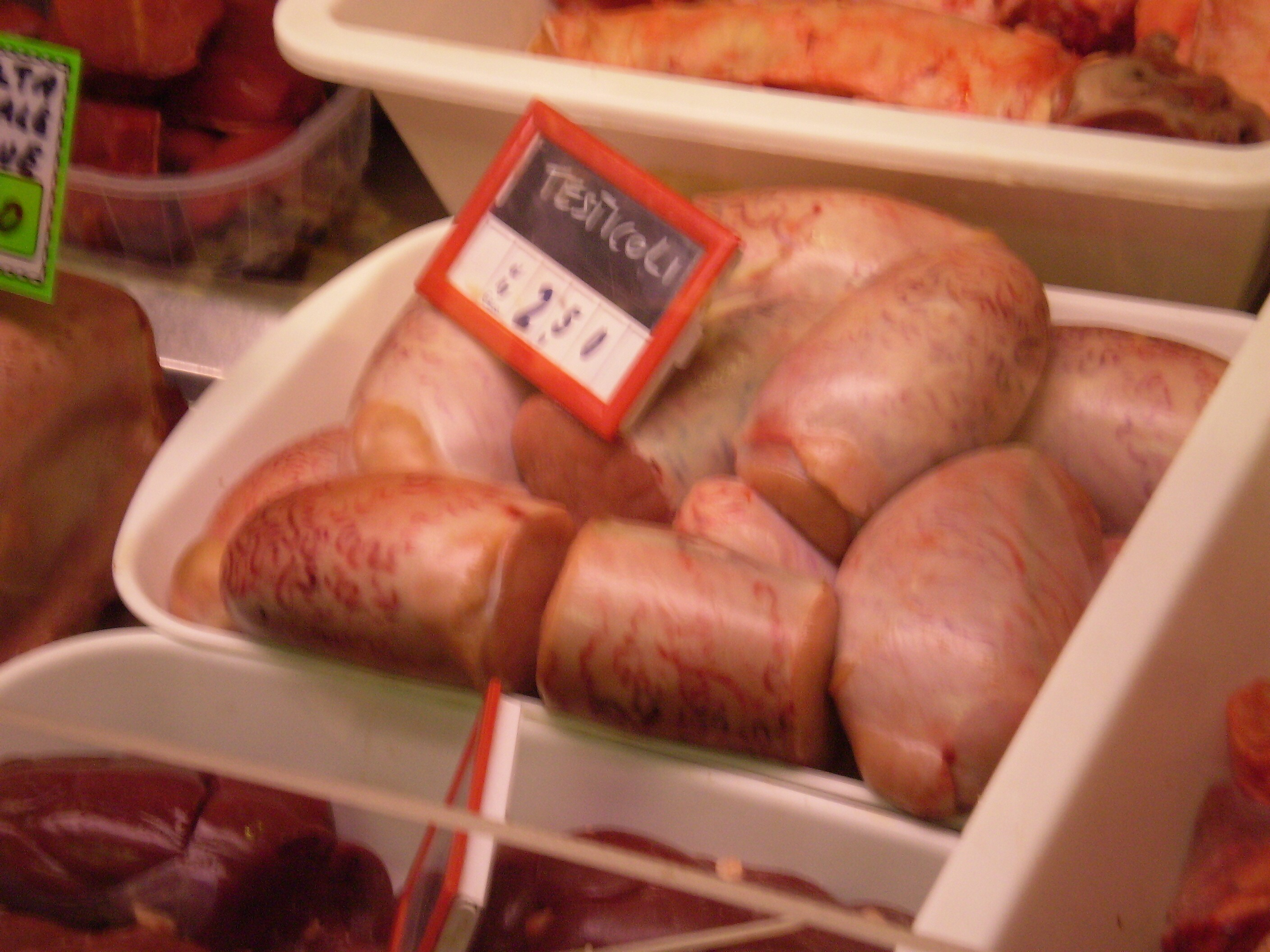
- Bovine testicles offered for sale on an Italian market. Artist Rick Gibson preferred eating human testicles instead.
  In July 1989, artist Rick Gibson tried to eat a slice of human testicle in Vancouver but was stopped by the police. However, the charge was dropped and he publicly ate a testicle hors d'œuvre two months later.
- On 19 August 1989, New York City resident Daniel Rakowitz stabbed Monika Beerle to death in their apartment. He then boiled and ate her brains before distributing food containing her body parts to the homeless.

=== 1990s ===
- Jeffrey Dahmer, a serial killer living in Milwaukee, Wisconsin, United States, murdered 17 young men and boys between 1978 and 1991. Following his arrest, he told police that he had cut up the thighs, biceps, and internal organs of three of his victims and cooked them in a stovetop skillet before consuming them. He claimed they tasted like filet mignon.
- In November 1991, newlywed Omaima Aree Nelson murdered, dismembered, and cannibalized her husband, William E. "Bill" Nelson, in their Costa Mesa, California, home. Pathology reports indicate he was still alive when she began butchering his body, in a manner that court and media reports interpreted as ritualistic. She boiled and cooked his head in the oven, ate its flesh, and stored the foil-wrapped skull in the freezer. She skinned his torso and deep-fried his hands in oil. She also tasted his ribs after cooking them and dipping them in barbecue sauce.
- Andrei Chikatilo, a serial killer born in Soviet Ukraine, experienced killing and cannibalism as paraphilia. He was convicted for murdering more than 50 women and children in 1992 and executed two years later.
- The Chijon family was a South Korean gang that engaged in cannibalism between 1993 and 1994.
- On 21 February 1995, 21-year-old Brazilian farmer Marinaldo de Alcântara Silva killed his own mother, 54-year-old Raimunda Soares Alcântara Silva, with a knife and ate some parts of her face, before being shot dead by a soldier in Castanhal II, Belém, Brazil. Earlier, he wanted to kill a watchman from the Secretaria Estadual de Agricultura's building, Domingos Souza, but was prevented by his mother. Silva then threatened to set his family's hut on fire. His mother attempted to calm him down, but he stabbed her in the face, decapitated her, tore off her eyes, lips, nose and tongue, and ate the pieces. José Lima Soares, Silva's brother-in-law, called the police. Silva resisted arrest and was shot in the thigh, dying of haemorrhage. Before being shot, he injured a soldier, Miguel Gurjão.
- South African serial killer Stewart Wilken raped and murdered sex worker Georgina Zweni in Port Elizabeth on 27 July 1995 and proceeded to cut off and eat her nipples while in the process of mutilating her corpse.
- Child molester Nathaniel Bar-Jonah was suspected of abducting, murdering and cannibalizing 10-year-old Zach Ramsay in February 1996. Bar-Jonah, who had sexual fantasies about eating human flesh, possessed a journal written in code which, when decoded, was found to contain a number of recipes for cooking and eating children. Neighbours recalled that he often hosted barbecues where he served "funny-tasting meat" that he claimed to have personally hunted despite never going hunting. He also had not made any grocery purchases in the month after Ramsay's disappearance and human hair and body tissue that was not his was found in his meat grinder.
- Alexander Spesivtsev killed and partially ate at least four young girls in Novokuznetsk, Russia. His mother assisted him and cooked the victims' flesh. Following their arrest in October 1996 and subsequent trial, Spesivtsev was permanently sent to a psychiatric hospital, while his mother was sentenced to a prison term.
- Former Liberian warlord General Butt Naked, who fought in the First Liberian Civil War, claimed in 2008 that he participated in human sacrifices during the war, which "included the killing of an innocent child and plucking out the heart, which was divided into pieces for us to eat". There had already been many rumours of such sacrifices during the war, but he was the first person to publicly claim having partaken in them. During former Liberian president Charles Taylor's trial at the Special Court for Sierra Leone, Joseph Marzah, Taylor's chief of operations and head of his alleged "death squad", accused him of ordering his fighters to commit acts of cannibalism against their enemies, including peacekeepers and United Nations personnel.
- Ilshat Kuzikov of St. Petersburg, Russia, was convicted in March 1997 of eating three male acquaintances since 1992.
- Between 1997 and 1998, Mikhail Malyshev murdered at least two acquaintances and cannibalized their remains at his apartment in Perm, Russia. He was sentenced to 25 years imprisonment with two years time served for these murders and multiple counts of animal cruelty, and was released in October 2022 after serving out his sentence in full.
- Julie Paterson was murdered in Darlington, England, by David Harker in April 1998. Her torso was later found in a bin liner, but her head and limbs were never located. Harker, who would be found guilty of manslaughter by way of diminished responsibility, boasted to friends and psychiatric workers that he had fried part of her leg and eaten it with pasta and cheese. Because he refused to reveal what he had done with the rest of her body, he was denied parole.
- In March 1999, in Indonesia, more than 200 (according to estimations) Madurese people were beheaded and eaten by Dayaks when an ethnic conflict erupted into violence.
- A court submission at the trial of perpetrators of the Snowtown murders in South Australia revealed that two of the murderers fried and ate a part of their final victim in 1999.
- Dorángel Vargas, also known as el comegente (Spanish for "people-eater"), was a Venezuelan serial killer and cannibal who killed and ate at least ten men in a period of two years preceding his arrest in 1999.
- On 13 August 1999, Kazakhstani authorities arrested two orderlies and a paramedic on charges of killing and eating seven prostitutes in Almaty from 1998 to 1999. The trio, nicknamed the Red Light District Orderlies, were all convicted and sentenced to death, but their sentences were later commuted to life imprisonment.
- Girly Chew Hossencofft disappeared and was presumed murdered in Albuquerque, New Mexico on 9 September 1999. According to prosecutor Paul Spiers, Linda Henning, one of the people convicted of her murder, later boasted to at least four people that she had eaten Girly Chew's flesh after she was killed. Spiers chose not to present this evidence at trial for fear it would sensationalize the case, but later presented it at Henning's sentencing.

== 21st century ==
=== 2000s ===
- In February 2000, Australian Katherine Knight killed her partner John Price and cooked his corpse, later preparing to serve it to his children.
- On 11 March 2000, Igor Churasov and Gennady Shurmanov were arrested for murdering seven people in Ryazan, Russia, from 1997 to 2000. It was later revealed that Churasov dismembered some of the victims' corpses and ate parts of them. Both men were found incompetent to stand trial for reasons of insanity and instead committed to a psychiatric hospital.
- The Chinese performance artist Zhu Yu cooked and ate what he claimed to be a human fetus in a controversial performance entitled "Eating People" at an arts festival in Shanghai in 2000. When pictures of it began to circulate on the Internet one year later, both the FBI and Scotland Yard started investigations into the matter. Zhu claimed that "no religion forbids cannibalism, nor can I find any law which prevents us from eating people", and said that he "took advantage of the space between morality and the law", publicly performing an act that is widely considered immoral but not actually illegal. Whether he ate an actual fetus is unclear. He claims to have cooked and eaten a six-month-old aborted fetus stolen from a medical school, but others maintain that the "fetus" might have been a prop, possibly constructed by placing a doll's head on a duck carcass.
- In February–March 2001 in Indonesia, violence between Dayaks and Madurese erupted again during the Sampit conflict, with various reports indicating that body parts, including the hearts, of Madurese victims were eaten.
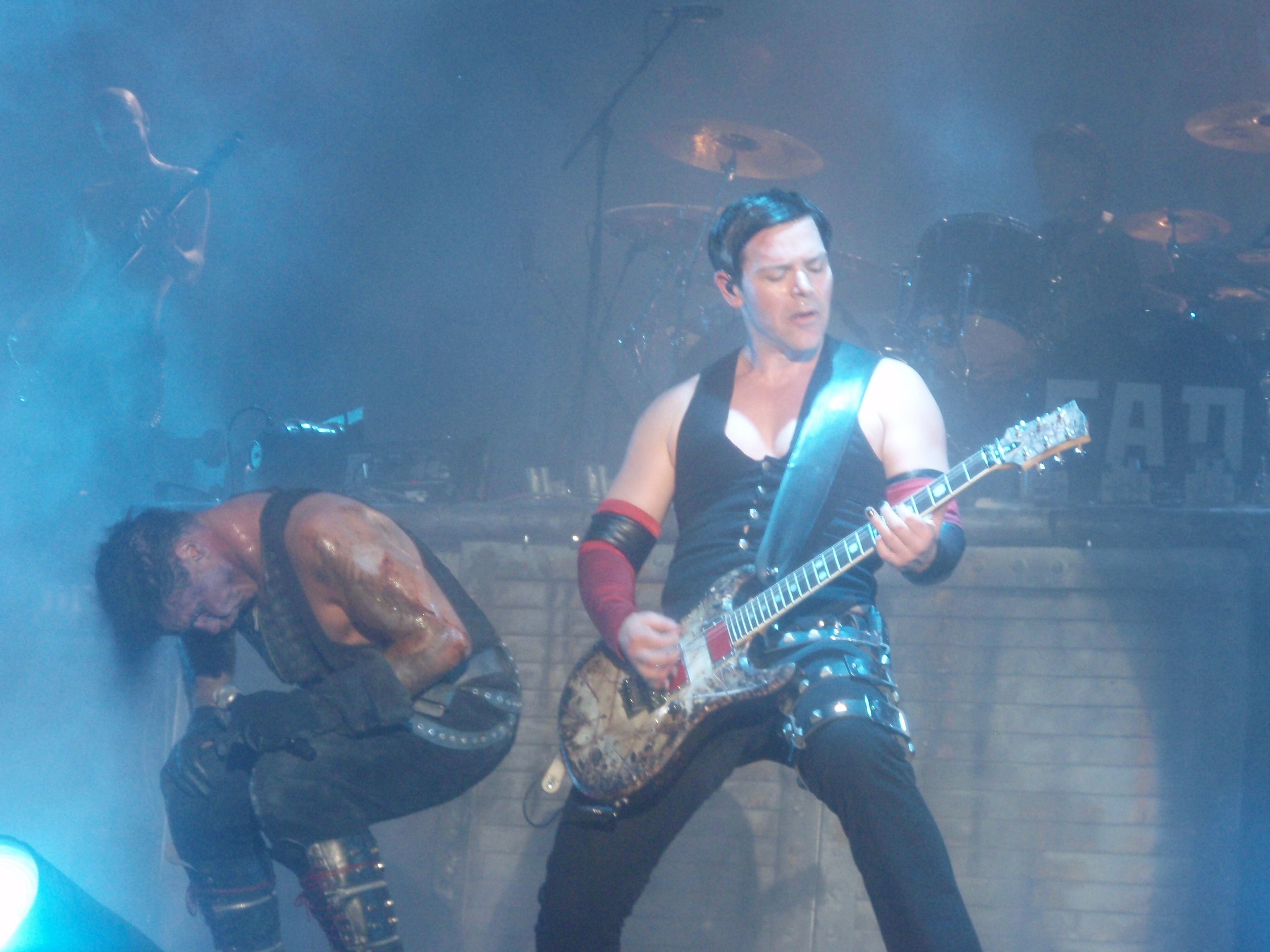
- Rammstein released a song about the Meiwes case.
  In March 2001 in Germany, Armin Meiwes posted an Internet ad seeking a young man willing to be slaughtered and eaten. The ad was answered by Bernd Jürgen Brandes. Meiwes stabbed Brandes in the neck with a kitchen knife, kissing him first, then chopped him up into several pieces. He placed several pieces of Brandes in his freezer. Over the next few weeks, Meiwes defrosted and cooked parts of Brandes in olive oil and garlic, eventually consuming 20 kg of human flesh. Meiwes was convicted of manslaughter in 2004. A retrial in 2006 found Meiwes guilty of murder and sentenced him to life imprisonment. Three songs, "Mein Teil" by Rammstein, "Eaten" by Bloodbath, and "Armin Meiwes" by SKYND, are based on this case.
- In April 2001 in Kansas City, Kansas, United States, Marc Sappington went on a murder spree and was subsequently convicted of murdering four acquaintances. He gained notoriety for eating part of the leg of one of his victims, Alton "Fred" Brown.
- Between 2000 and 2004, Anatoly Kondratyev murdered at least four elderly people in Ukraine's Odesa and Lviv Oblasts with the aim of stealing their valuables and selling their apartments. In his confessions, he admitted to dismembering his victims' remains and claimed to have given some of them to their neighbours for consumption.
- In July 2002, four Ukrainians were arrested in Kyiv for killing and eating a teenage girl. They were suspected of killing at least six people.
- In late 2002, Russian brothers Denis and Evgenyi Gorin were arrested for killing an acquaintance in Aniva, Sakhalin Oblast, and then eating the soft tissues of his body. Both served minor prison sentences and killed at least three people after release, with Denis eating parts of one victim.
- In a 2003 drug-related case, the rapper Big Lurch was convicted of the murder and partial consumption of an acquaintance while both were under the influence of PCP.
- In 2003 and 2004, South Korean serial killer Yoo Young-chul murdered a total of 21 people, eating the livers of several of his victims.
- On 13 January 2004, police in the Ukrainian town of Nova Kakhovka arrested 41-year-old local Volodymyr Dovgy on charges of killing his friend, Andriy Rebenkov, and dismembering his body. Dovgy later admitted to killing Rebenkov and at least nine prostitutes in the area starting in 1999, claiming that he had cooked, canned and eaten some of the remains with the help of his female friend, Olga Melnyk.
- In February 2004, 34-year-old Peter Bryan from East London was caught after he killed his friend Brian Cherry and ate parts of his brain, fried in butter. He had been arrested for murder previously but was released shortly before this act was committed. For the murder of Cherry, Bryan was sentenced to life imprisonment, despite his claim of diminished responsibility. In January 2006, his sentence was revised to a minimum of 15 years.
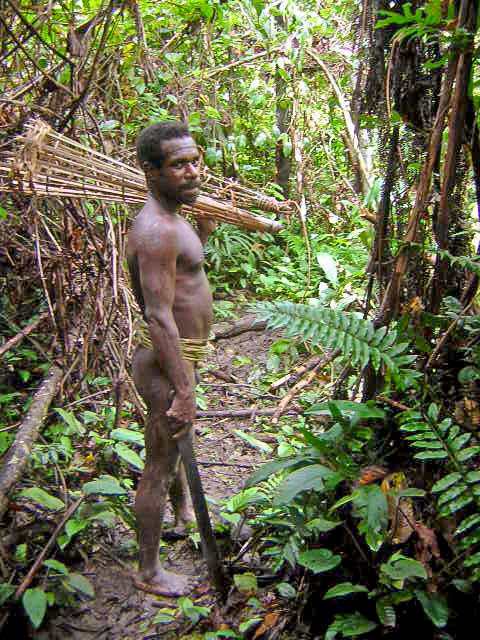
- A Korowai man
  In 2006, it was reported that the Korowai people of south-eastern Papua could be one of the last ethnic groups in the world still engaging in cannibalism. Some suspect, however, that the claims of continued cannibalism are exaggerations designed to attract the interest of tourists.
- Between 2005 and 2006, Surinder Koli allegedly killed at least nineteen people, most of them young girls, in Uttar Pradesh, India. Koli's employer was also convicted for involvement in two of the murders. Various media reported that Koli had eaten parts of the murdered children, but the police were "cautious" regarding such rumours, not ruling out the possibility due to the "barbarous brutalities" with which the murders had been committed, but refusing to positively confirm it. In a retrial in 2023, the two accused were acquitted of all charges due to a lack of convincing evidence, much to the dismay of the victims' families.
- On 5 January 2007, French authorities reported that a prison inmate committed cannibalism on a cellmate, in the city of Rouen.
- On 13 January 2007, the artist Marco Evaristti hosted a dinner party where the main course was agnolotti pasta that was topped with a meatball made from his own fat, removed some time before in a liposuction operation.
- At least 29 albino Tanzanians were murdered between March 2007 and November 2008 out of a "belief that potions made from an albino's legs, hair, hands, and blood can make a person rich". In one case, a group of men cut off the legs of a young albino child before slitting the child's throat, and then they drank the fresh blood. Another man was arrested while transporting an albino baby's head to a witch doctor who had offered to pay for it.
- On 14 September 2007, Özgür Dengiz was arrested in Ankara, the Turkish capital, after killing and eating a man. After cutting slices of flesh from his victim's body, Dengiz distributed the rest to stray dogs on the street, according to his own testimony. He ate some of the man's flesh raw on his way home. Dengiz, who lived with his parents, arrived at the family house and placed the remaining parts of the body in the refrigerator without saying a word to his parents.
- On 8 October 2007, Mexican police arrested José Luis Calva on suspicion of murdering his girlfriend. Numerous pieces of human flesh were discovered in his house, some of them cooked. Calva said he had accidentally strangled her. He admitted having cooked some of her flesh, but claimed he had wanted to feed it to stray dogs rather than eat it. He died in an apparent suicide while awaiting trial.
- On 2 May 2008, it was announced that the British model Anthony Morley had been arrested for the murder, dismemberment and partial cannibalization of his lover, magazine executive Damian Oldfield. Police believed that Morley killed Oldfield, who worked for the gay lifestyle magazine Bent, after inviting him into his flat in Leeds, England. He then removed a section of his leg and began cooking it, before he stumbled into a nearby kebab house around 2:30 in the morning, drenched in blood and asking that someone call the police. He was found guilty on 17 October 2008 and sentenced to life imprisonment.
- Members of a Satanist youth gang killed four teenagers (three girls and a boy) in Satanic rituals in the Russian Yaroslavl region in 2008. After killing their victims, they beheaded the corpses, ate their tongues, breasts, and hearts, and had sex with the corpses. Nikolai Ogolobyak, who had been an adult at the time of the murders, was sentenced to 20 years in a penal colony. Several minors who had also been involved received sentences of 8–10 years or were sent to mental institutions. In 2023, Ogolobyak was pardoned after having volunteered to fight in the Russian invasion of Ukraine.
- On 30 July 2008, Tim McLean, a 22-year-old Canadian man, was stabbed, beheaded and cannibalized while riding a Greyhound Canada bus near Portage la Prairie, Manitoba. According to witnesses, McLean was sleeping with his headphones on when the man sitting next to him, Vincent Li, pulled a large knife out of his backpack and began stabbing him in the neck and chest. The attacker then decapitated McLean, severed other body parts, and consumed some of McLean's flesh.
- In a documentary by Colombian journalist Hollman Morris, a demobilized paramilitary confessed that during the mass killings that took place in Colombia's rural areas, many of the paras performed cannibalism. He also confessed that they were told to drink the blood of their victims in the belief that it would make them want to kill more.
- In November 2008, a group of five undocumented immigrants from the Dominican Republic, who were en route to Puerto Rico, ate the flesh of starved companions after being lost at sea for over 15 days. They were finally rescued by a US Coast Guard patrol boat.
- In February 2009, it was reported that five members of the Kulina tribe in Brazil were wanted by Brazilian authorities on the charge of murdering, butchering, and eating a farmer in a ritual act of cannibalism.
- In April 2009, two men from the city of Perm, Russia, killed and ate their brother.
- On 28 April 2009, Angelo Mendoza Sr. attacked his 4-year-old son, eating the boy's left eye and damaging the boy's right eye. Angelo Mendoza Jr. told authorities "my daddy ate my eyes", when they came to the scene. Mendoza was charged with mayhem, torture, child cruelty, and inflicting an injury to a child, and was later found not guilty by reason of insanity.
- In October 2012, Japanese authorities convicted three men for killing and eating a man to whom they owed money in 2009.
- On 26 July 2009, a woman in San Antonio, Texas, killed her 3-week-old son and then ate parts of the infant's corpse. She was found not guilty by reason of insanity and sentenced to involuntary commitment.
- On 14 November 2009, three homeless men in Perm, Russia, were arrested for killing and eating the parts of a 25-year-old male victim. The remaining body parts were then sold to a local pie and kebab house.
- Between 2009 and 2011, serial killer Alexander Bychkov engaged in numerous acts of cannibalism, targeting people he had previously lured into his house in Berlinskoe, Russia.

=== 2010s ===
- In April and May 2010, PhD student Stephen Griffiths from Bradford, England, killed and ate three prostitutes, becoming known as the Crossbow Cannibal.
- In November 2010, Isakin Jonsson killed and decapitated his girlfriend in Skara, Sweden. With a knife, saw and axe, he separated her head from the body. He also cut off pieces of flesh from one of her arms and legs, which he carried into the kitchen to cook. He prepared them with salt and homegrown cannabis leaves, and ate them. He also carried her head over to the kitchen counter and processed it with an axe and knife, possibly to eat it. Jonsson was convicted of murder and sentenced to forensic psychiatric care.
- In April 2011, in the town of Darya Khan, Punjab, Pakistan, the brothers Arif Ali and Farman Ali were arrested for eating a human corpse stolen from a grave. They were cooking body parts for a meal when they were arrested; the police also recovered further human remains from their house. They were released from jail in 2013; however, in April 2014, they were again discovered making curry out of a human corpse (this time, of a two- to three-year-old child), presumed to have been stolen from a graveyard.
- On 9 July 2011, a model in the St. Petersburg region of Russia drowned her colleague and consumed parts of her corpse. She was later detained, found guilty of murder, and sent to a psychiatric hospital for treatment, where she was diagnosed with schizophrenia.
- In August 2011, police found body parts of various victims in the refrigerator of serial killer Matej Čurko, including of two Slovak women who disappeared in 2010.
- In 2011, officials in South Korea received a tip that ethnic Koreans living in China were smuggling drug capsules into the country containing powder made from dead babies, using them as stamina boosters. Some smuggled the capsules into South Korea to consume them or distribute them to other ethnic Koreans for consumption. Reportedly, the capsules were made in northeastern China from aborted fetuses whose bodies were chopped into small pieces and dried on stoves before being turned into powder.
- In December 2011, a man killed and ate a homeless man in the city of Bridgeport, Connecticut, United States. The perpetrator of the crime was later found insane and committed to a maximum-security psychiatric hospital.
- On 21 March 2012, a Vladivostok man killed his friend, later selling his meat in a local market. Another man was convicted of knowingly consuming the flesh of the victim.
- On 13 April 2012, the Japanese artist Mao Sugiyama cut off, cooked, and served his genitals to five people. Each of the diners paid $250 for their portion.
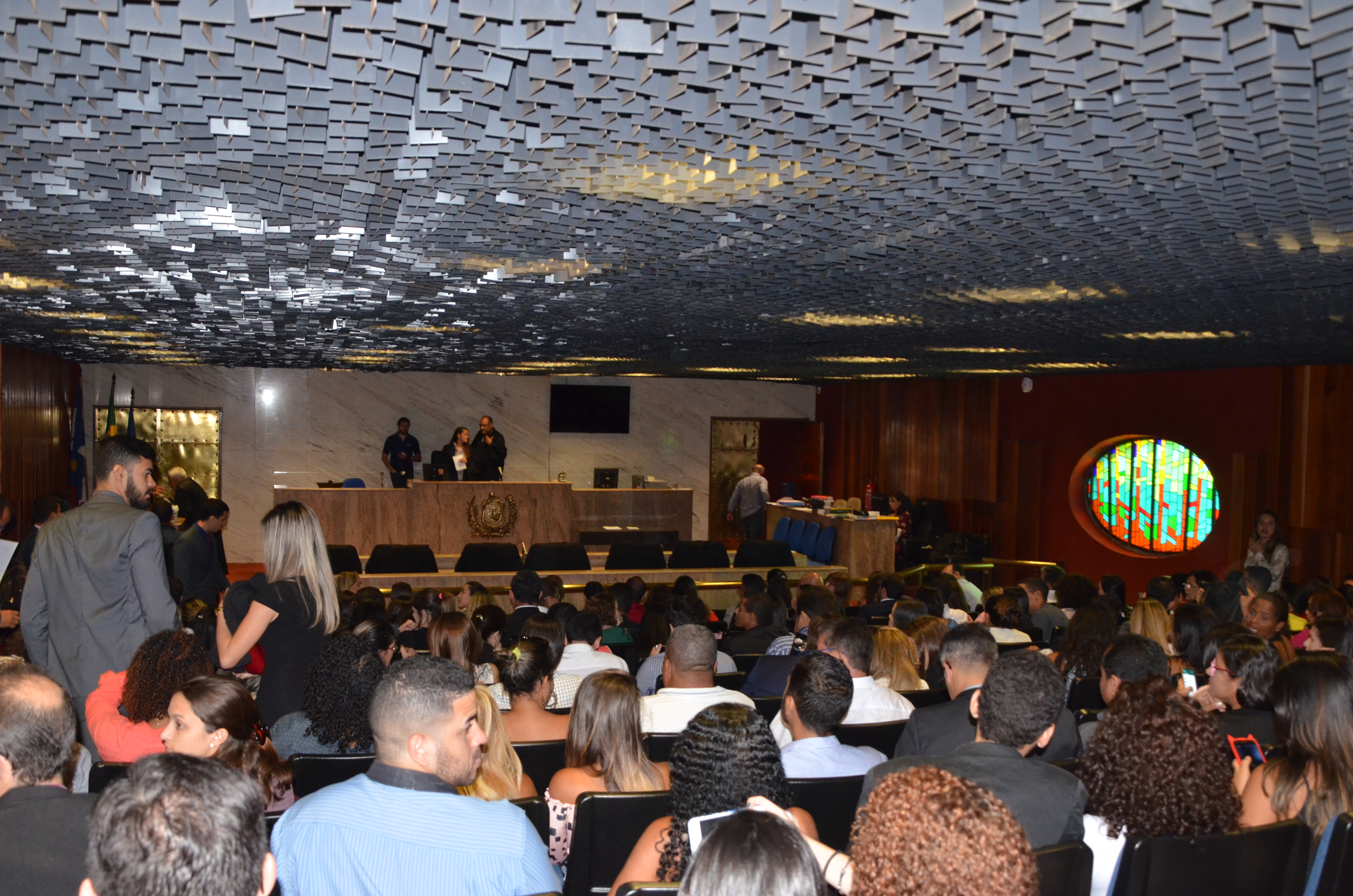
- Trial of the Garanhuns cannibals (2018)
  In April 2012, a man and two women, subsequently called the "Garanhuns cannibals", were arrested in the town of Garanhuns, Pernambuco, Brazil, for murdering at least two women and eating their flesh. One of the suspects is said to have used some of the flesh of her victims for making pastries, which she allegedly sold in the town.
- In April 2012, Jieming Liu, 79, was accused of killing his wife and eating some of her flesh in Shrewsbury, Massachusetts. The couple had immigrated from China in November 2011.
- Chinese student Jun Lin was murdered in Montreal on the night of 24–25 May 2012 by Luka Magnotta, who then uploaded a video to the Internet entitled 1 Lunatic, 1 Ice Pick depicting Magnotta dismembering Lin's corpse and performing sex acts on the remains. The Canadian police later obtained a longer, unedited version of the video which showed Magnotta eating Lin's dismembered body parts.
- On 25 May 2012, 21-year-old Kenyan American Alexander Kinyua murdered a man and allegedly ate his organs due to mental illness in Joppatowne, Maryland. The killing came after Kinyua was released on bail following a separate brutal attack; he was later found not fit to stand trial due to being diagnosed with paranoid schizophrenia.
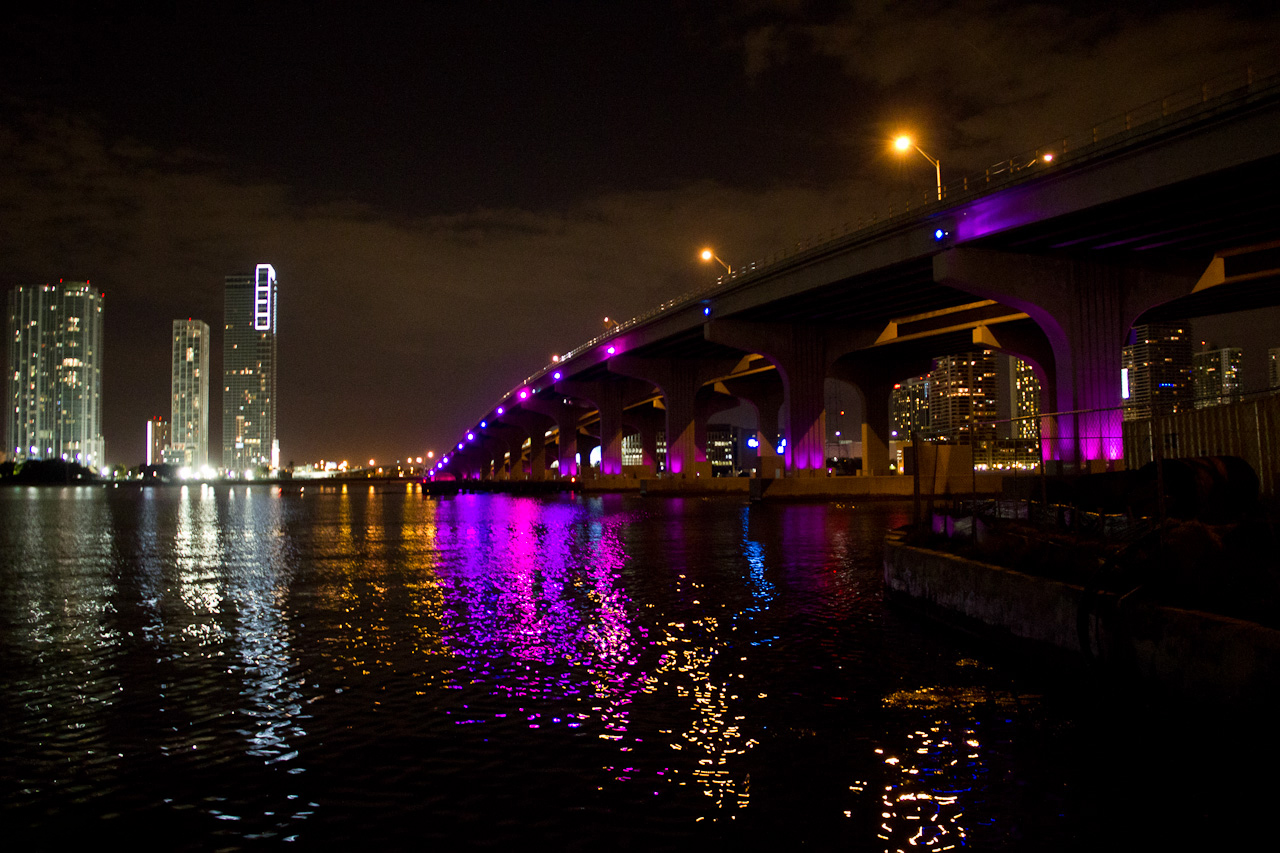
- The MacArthur Causeway at night
  On 26 May 2012, police in Miami, Florida, United States, shot and killed Rudy Eugene, 31, after he was found on the MacArthur Causeway naked and eating the face of a homeless man, Ronald Poppo, 65, who survived the attack. Police believed that Eugene was under the influence of a synthetic drug, but the autopsy showed only marijuana in his system. A security camera at the headquarters of the Miami Herald caught the attack live on film, which quickly began making rounds on the internet. Poppo needed facial surgery after the attack, with treatment continued for at least one year.
- In July 2012, 29 people accused of being members of a cannibal cult were arrested in northeast Papua New Guinea after eating at least seven people (four men and three women) believed to be sorcerers.
- On 26 December 2012, Mridul Kumar Bhattacharya and his wife Rita Bhattacharya, who owned tea gardens in Assam, India, were murdered by an angry mob of workers. Cannibalism was later reported in the incident.
- On 10 January 2013, the Chinese cannibal Zhang Yongming, aged 57, was executed for his crimes. He sold victims' flesh as "ostrich meat" and kept eyeballs in wine.
- On 17 March 2013 in North Bay, Ontario, Canada, a 47-year-old man sexually assaulted and mutilated a 77-year-old woman, eating pieces of flesh he had cut from her body. The victim survived severely wounded. The man reportedly suffered from severe depression and had committed his attack during a psychotic incident.
- In May 2013, during the Syrian civil war, a rebel named Abu Sakkar was filmed cutting open the body of a fallen enemy soldier and biting into one of his organs.
- In July 2013, the Italian Lino Renzi, aged 45, was discovered by the police cooking remains of his 70-year-old mother. The police had been called by a neighbour who complained about a disgusting stench coming from Renzi's apartment. Pieces of the body were discovered in a freezer, oven and pots, while most of the corpse, lying in the bathroom, featured severe mutilation to arms and legs, with several intestine pieces removed. Renzi confessed that his mother had not died of natural causes, but that he had beaten her to death after a quarrel before dismembering her with a saw and a butcher knife.
- On 13 January 2014, the BBC reported that a man nicknamed "Mad Dog" ate the foot of a rival during the Central African Republic Civil War.
- One evening in February 2014, a man named Dmitry Malyshev murdered a drinking buddy in the village of Rakhinka, in Russia's Volgograd Oblast. He then cut out the victim's heart and filmed himself cooking it, but was apprehended before he could eat it. He was later sentenced to 25 years imprisonment for this and two previous murders he admitted to after his arrest.
- Lisa Marie Hyder was murdered by Gregory Hale on 8 June 2014 at Hale's home in Manchester, Tennessee. Hale, who claimed to be a Satanist, admitted to dismembering her and eating part of her body after killing her.
- On 15 September 2014, a man from Jeffersonville, Indiana, United States, ate parts of his girlfriend after killing her.
- On 31 October 2014, a crowd stoned to death, burned, and ate a suspected Allied Democratic Forces insurgent in the town of Beni, North Kivu, in the Democratic Republic of the Congo. The incident came after a number of ADF raids that brought that October's civilian death toll to more than 100 people.
- On 6 November 2014, Matthew Williams, 34, was allegedly found eating the face of a 22-year-old victim in a hotel room in the village of Argoed, near Blackwood, South Wales.
- On 6 January 2015, a Reuters report revealed that the Mexican La Familia Michoacana and Knights Templar cartels were forcing potential recruits to eat the hearts of their victims as part of an initiation rite.
- In November 2015, police in Bandar Lampung, Indonesia, arrested 30-year-old Rudi Efendi and his wife Nuriah on suspicion of murdering and castrating a man whom Nuriah accused of raping her, then cooking and eating his penis.
- Jimmy Prout was tortured and abused by Zahid Zaman and Ann Corbett over a period of months in late 2015 and early 2016 at his home in North Shields, England, culminating in his murder in February 2016. During Zaman and Corbett's murder trial, Newcastle Crown Court heard that they had sliced open Prout's scrotum, removed his testicles, and forced him to eat them.
- Gordon Semple was strangled to death by Stefano Brizzi in London on 1 April 2016 during a sex act. Evidence presented at trial showed that Brizzi had cooked and eaten parts of Semple's body during the following days.
- On 10 July 2016, an American man, along with ten of his friends, legally ate tacos made out of his own foot. The leg had been amputated three weeks earlier after his foot failed to heal following a motorcycle accident two years prior. The man asked his friends: "Remember how we always talked about how, if we ever had the chance to ethically eat human meat, would you do it?", and that led to the friends sharing meat cut from his amputated foot. Details of this incident were posted to Reddit in 2018.
- On 16 August 2016, 19-year-old Florida State University student Austin Harrouff fatally stabbed a couple, Michelle Mishcon and John Stevens, in their garage and began eating Stevens' face before being subdued by deputies.
- In 2017, a ring of cannibals was arrested by the police and tried in South Africa.
- In a CNN documentary series titled Believers, journalist Reza Aslan consumed a portion of a human brain presented to him by the Aghori Hindu sect.
- Journalist Jesús Lemus Barajas claimed in an interview in 2017 that he had witnessed Los Zetas cartel kingpin Heriberto Lazcano Lazcano eating flesh from the buttocks of enemies he had sentenced to death. According to Barajas, before they died the victims were forced to bathe for two hours and given whiskey in order to reduce adrenaline levels and allow the meat to de-stress. They would then be killed as quickly as possible and their buttocks would be served to Lazcano in tamales, on toast, or in a stew. Barajas stated that he also saw other Los Zetas members knowingly eat of the human flesh, which was served during meetings.
- In August 2017, a man living in Kolhapur, Maharashtra, India, killed his mother and ate her heart with chutney and pepper.
- After being arrested in March 2018, Russian serial killer Eduard Seleznev was found to have killed and eaten three people.
- Marius Gustavson, a self-proclaimed "eunuch maker" based in the United Kingdom who amputated men's genitals for a fee and posted videos of the surgeries online for a paying audience, was alleged to have eaten a man's testicles in 2018. At Gustavson's trial for grievous bodily harm in 2024, prosecutors presented images on his phone dated 22 June 2018 which appeared to show him preparing a pair of testicles he had amputated and then eating them with a salad for lunch.
- On 30 October 2018, a father and son were arrested in Saltivka, Kharkiv, Ukraine, after being accused of beheading an ex-police officer, aged 45, and consuming his body.
- In February 2019, Alberto Sánchez Gómez was arrested in Madrid, Spain. He subsequently confessed to killing his mother, cutting her body into pieces, and sharing some of the meat with his dog to eat.
- On 24 December 2019, Kevin Bacon, a 25-year-old hairstylist from Swartz Creek, Michigan, went to meet a man named Mark Latunski for casual sex and never returned. On 27 December, police visited Latunski's home and found Bacon's mutilated corpse hanging upside down from the ceiling. Latunski admitted the murder, and said he had cut off and eaten Bacon's testicles. After he was found fit to stand trial, Latunski pleaded guilty and was sentenced to life imprisonment without parole.

=== 2020s ===
- In 2021 in Russia, four members of the satanic Order of Nine Angles were arrested after two confessed to ritual murders involving cannibalism in Karelia and Saint Petersburg.
- In September 2021, serial killer Jason Thornburg murdered at least three people in ritualistic sacrifices in Fort Worth, Texas. He admitted to eating parts of the heart of one victim.
- In October 2022, three people were arrested in Kerala, India, for performing a human sacrifice. During interrogation, it was revealed that they killed two women and then cooked and ate body parts of the victims in hopes of health and prosperity.
- On 24 February 2023, police in Tai Po, Hong Kong, found the remains of influencer Abby Choi, who had allegedly been murdered three days earlier and then cooked into soup. Parts of Choi's remains were found in the refrigerator at the suspect's home, while more pieces of human tissue were found in two pots of soup. Choi's head and ribs were reportedly found in a pot of soup two days later.
- In early 2024, a video went viral which showed a Haitian man taking a bite out of a human leg that was on fire. While social media users claimed the video showed a recent event during the ongoing Haitian unrest, it was in fact two years old and depicted an incident that occurred during a feud between two gangs in the Artibonite Valley region.
- In March 2024, in Wasco, California, a man was run over and killed by a train. An apparently homeless man then took his severed leg and was seen chewing on it and hitting it on walls and other objects.
- In April 2024, a 29-year-old homeless man was arrested in downtown Las Vegas, kneeling over the corpse of a man he had allegedly knocked to the ground and killed. The victim was missing an eyeball and an ear, which the suspect said he ate. The suspect claimed to be possessed and that he had been hearing voices telling him to kill someone named Drake, whom he did not know.
- Florentina Holzinger's musical production Sancta, which premiered in 2024 in Stuttgart, Germany, features real on-stage excision of a piece of skin from the abdomen of a cast member, followed by its consumption by another cast member, symbolizing the Eucharist.
- Ukraine's military intelligence agency, the HUR, released an intercepted phone call in 2025 in which Russian soldiers discussed one of their comrades, "Brelok", who had allegedly killed and eaten another Russian soldier with the call sign "Foma". Later, "Brelok" was killed in battle. HUR characterized the call as evidence of the "moral and psychological collapse" of Russian forces.

== See also ==
- Human cannibalism for a more systematic treatment of cannibal practices among humans
- Cannibalism for cannibalism in general
- Autocannibalism, the practice of eating oneself (also called self-cannibalism)
- Child cannibalism for children as victims of cannibalism (in myth and reality)
- List of autocannibalism incidents
