= History of Porto Alegre =

History of a Brazilian city

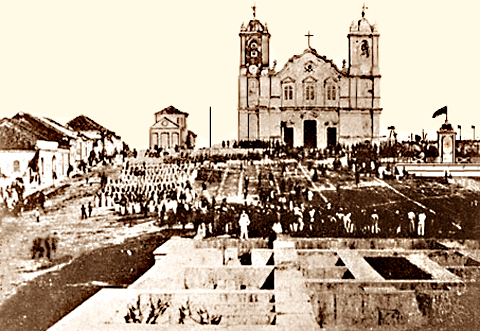
Reception to Emperor Dom Pedro II at the Mother Church Square, 1865.

The history of Porto Alegre, capital of Rio Grande do Sul, Brazil, officially begins on March 26, 1772, when the primitive village was elevated to the condition of a parish. However, its origins are older, since the settlement was created as a result of the colonization of the area by Portuguese ranchers in the 17th century. The region, in fact, has been inhabited by man since 11,000 years ago. Throughout the 19th century, the settlement began to grow with the help of many European immigrants of various origins, African slaves, and portions of Hispanics from the River Plate region. At the beginning of the 20th century, Porto Alegre's expansion acquired a very accelerated rhythm, consolidating its supremacy among all the cities in Rio Grande do Sul and projecting it on the national scene. From then on, its most characteristic traits, only sketched out in the previous century, were defined; many still remain visible today, especially in its historic center. Throughout the entire 20th century, the city strove to expand its urban network in an organized way and provide it with the necessary services, achieving significant success, but also facing various difficulties, at the same time as it developed its own expressive culture, which, at some moments, influenced other regions of Brazil in many fields, from politics to the plastic arts. Today, Porto Alegre is one of Brazil's largest capitals and one of the richest and one with the best quality of life, having received several international distinctions. It hosts many important events and has been pointed out several times as a model of administration for other large cities.

== Beginning of colonization ==
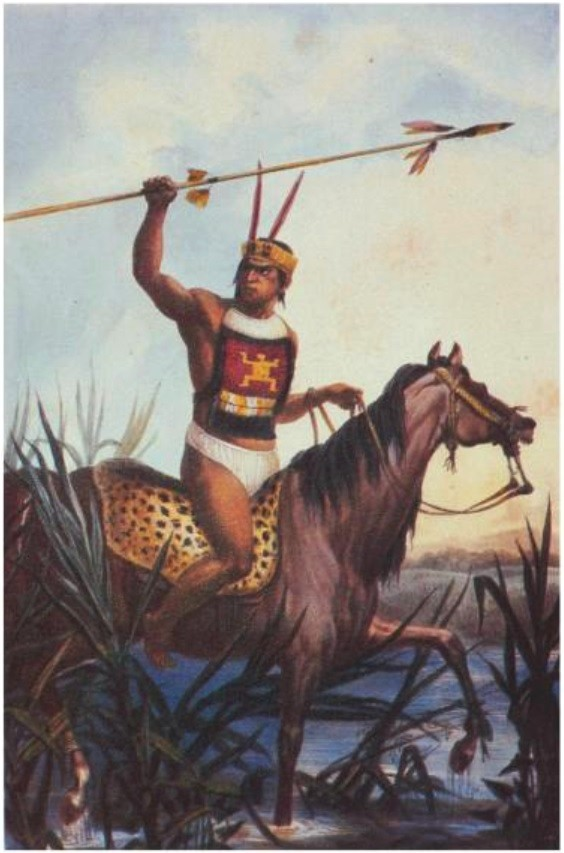
Charrua Indian, painted by Debret in the 19th century.

At the time of the Discovery, the region where Porto Alegre is located was inhabited by the Guaraní, Charruas, Minuano and Tapes indigenous groups. With the establishment of the Treaty of Tordesillas in 1494 and the subsequent discovery of Brazil in 1500, the region up to Laguna, in Santa Catarina, remained under Portuguese domination, while Rio Grande do Sul was under Spanish domination.

However, with the Iberian Union, which lasted from 1580 to 1640, these boundaries became meaningless. Since there was little interest from the metropolis in these lands, several Portuguese explorers began to settle spontaneously near the coast. When Portugal restored its independence from the Kingdom of Spain in 1640, there were already many estancias in the region, especially north of the Ducks' Lagoon and near the mouth of the Jacuí River. In 1680, the Portuguese founded Colonia del Sacramento in Uruguay, today the city of Colônia, and the coast of Rio Grande do Sul began to be traveled intensively as a route to supply the colony and to guarantee possession of the territory.

In 1732, Manoel Gonçalves Ribeiro, a native of Laguna, received a sesmaria in the area known as Campos de Viamão, where the formation of a settlement called Capela Grande do Viamão began, which would become the second capital of the state. Other colonizers who received land in the region were Sebastião Francisco Chaves, Dionisyo Rodrigues Mendes and Jerônimo de Ornelas, owner of the sesmaria of Sant'Anna, the most important, located on the current Sant'Anna Hill, in a lot he already occupied since 1732 with his residence and a ranch for raising cattle. Near the old mouth of the Diluvio stream there was already an anchorage called Port of Viamão, which also became known as Port of Dornelles.

In 1742, the king of Portugal, at the request of Brigadier José da Silva Pais, published an order authorizing the emigration of Azoreans to southern Brazil, who were initially to settle in the region of Santa Catarina. On December 7, 1744, Jerônimo de Ornelas received, by Royal Letters, the confirmation of possession of the lands already occupied and intensified his cattle breeding. With the headquarters located on Sant'Anna Hill, the rest of their property was just uninhabited countryside, with the exception of a few families living on the shores of the lake formed by the Guaíba River, at the tip of the peninsula, where the historic center of Porto Alegre is today. There, they built a tiny chapel, consecrated to Saint Francis of the Wounds, which was elevated to a curate in 1747.

In 1750, after the signing of the Treaty of Madrid, the governor of Santa Catarina, Manoel Escudeiro de Souza, was ordered to send a group of couples that were about to arrive from the Azores to the Port of Viamão. In 1751, 60 families were selected, making a total of about 300 people who arrived at the site in January 1752, being sent to lands already demarcated on Sant'Anna Hill. However, the site was poor in water sources, being abandoned later, leading the population to settle near the port that, for this reason, became known as the Port of Couples. In the same year, a new wave of Azoreans arrived, joining some 60 militiamen from Colonel Cristóvão Pereira de Abreu's detachment, who were sent to provide protection and assistance to the inhabitants. Along with the troops came the first religious, Friar Faustino Antônio de Santo Alberto, a Carmelite military chaplain. Also in 1752, Jerônimo de Ornelas, feeling harmed by the Azorean occupation of the tip of the peninsula, sold his land to Ignácio Francisco, although the letter of confirmation of his sesmaria contained the obligation to leave half a league from the lake towards the interior as an area of public use. The area was then expropriated and legally made available to the settlers already installed, but the actual sharing and delivery of the individual rural lots would only happen in 1772. The first site built was the cemetery, on the edge of the Guaíba River and near the Harmonia Square, which was later transferred to the Morro da Praia, today known as Praça da Matriz (English: Mother Church Square).

== Creation of the parish ==
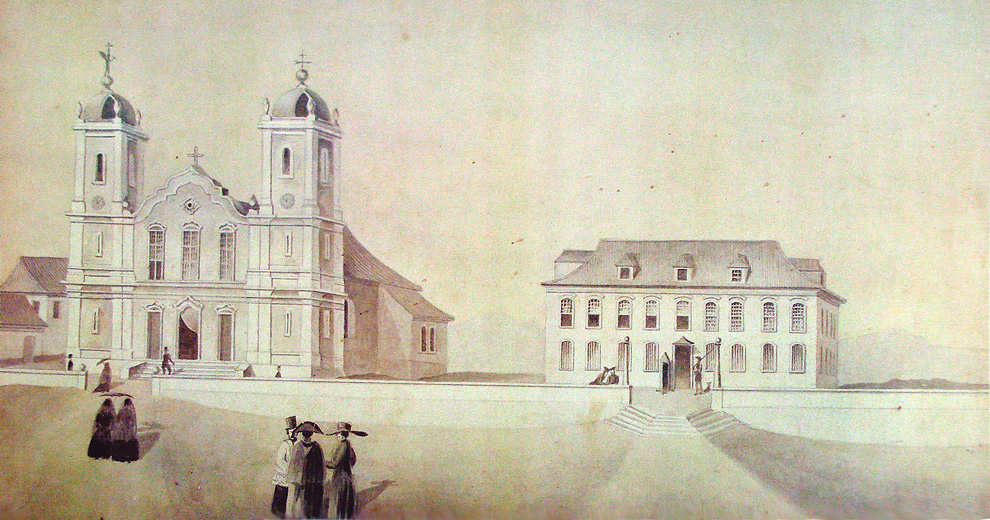
The old Mother Church and the Governor's Palace, the first two important buildings in the city, built after 1770. Watercolor by Herrmann Rudolf Wendroth, c. 1851.

With the passage of control of the then capital of the captaincy, the village of Rio Grande, to Spanish rule in 1763, the government was transferred to Viamão and a large part of the population of Rio Grande took refuge in the Port of Couples, extending the inhabited area. On March 26, 1772, the official date of Porto Alegre's foundation, this primitive settlement was elevated to a parish under the name of São Francisco do Porto dos Casais, because the town's first chapel was dedicated to Saint Francis of the Wounds. Still in 1772, the settlers received the titles to their lots, with a quadrilateral of about 141 hectares dedicated to the formation of the urban nucleus, occupying the entire area of the peninsula. Its initial layout was made by cartographer Captain Alexandre José Montanha, in the expropriated region of the Sant'Anna sesmaria, but the original tracing has never been found. To keep up with the population growth and in recognition of the strategic importance of the port, Governor Marcelino de Figueiredo moved the capital again in 1773, from Viamão to Porto Alegre, which was then known as Freguesia da Nossa Senhora da Madre de Deus de Porto Alegre. According to Sebastião da Câmara, the change of the capital had been ordered by the then viceroy of Brazil, the Marquis of Lavradio.

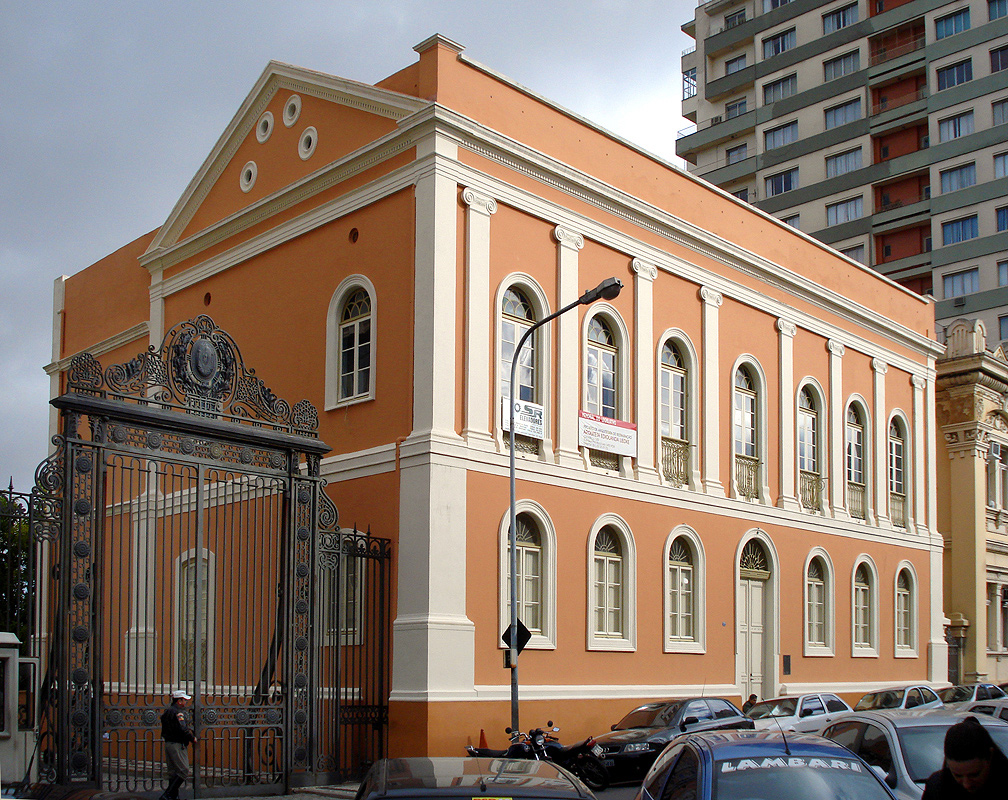
Casa da Junta, from 1790, former headquarters of the Board of Administration and Collection of the Treasury and the Legislative Assembly.

Therefore, it begins the reorganization of the settlement as the capital of the Province. In 1774, the War Arsenal, the first Mother Church and the Governor's Palace were built, and four years later fortifications were erected on the perimeter opposite the lake. In the following two decades there were already several potteries in activity, indicating a growing demand for construction materials such as tiles, floors, and bricks; shipyards were already building ships to order for Rio de Janeiro, commerce was being structured, and city councilors were concerned with the beautification and cleanliness of streets and public places. Some of Porto Alegre's oldest squares, such as the XV de Novembro Square, the Mother Church Square, and the Alfândega Square, which still exists, were also beginning to take shape. In the cultural field, the first opera house was built in 1794, even though it was only a rudimentary wooden shed, at the Ferreiros Alley. In the surroundings, the settlers were involved in agriculture and various animal husbandry activities for the sustenance of the citizens, with emphasis on the production of wheat and flour. The owner of one of the most important mills of the time, Francisco Antônio da Silveira, known as Chico da Azenha, ended up lending his nickname to the entire neighborhood, Azenha, proving the importance of this agricultural activity. Other mills marked the memory of the people of Porto Alegre, which led to the creation of a neighborhood called Moinhos de Vento. The charqueadas also settled in the suburbs of the city, attracted by the urban growth. As these small industries proliferated in their surroundings, the houses that would give rise to some of the neighborhoods farther from the center, such as Cristal and Tristeza, began to cluster. At the end of the 18th century, Porto Alegre had almost 4 thousand inhabitants.

== 19th Century ==
The charter of August 27, 1808 and the Royal Resolution of October 7, 1809 elevated the parish to the category of village, establishing it on December 11, 1810. Through a charter of December 16, 1812, Porto Alegre became the seat of the newly created Captaincy of São Pedro do Rio Grande, and head of the comarca of São Pedro do Rio Grande e Santa Catarina. In 1814, the new governor, Dom Diogo de Souza, obtained the granting of a large sesmaria in the north, with the purpose of stimulating local agriculture. Due to the growth of nearby cities such as Rio Pardo and Santo Antônio da Patrulha and in view of its privileged geographical situation, at the confluence of the two largest internal navigation routes - the Jacuí River and the Ducks' Lagoon - Porto Alegre began to become the largest commercial center in the Province. The permanent fleet that attended the port at that time consisted of about 100 ships, requiring the construction of a large pier on the lake for berthing and the opening of customs. Exports of wheat and dried beef also began. In 1816, 400 alqueires of wheat were traded to Lisbon and, in 1818, more than 120 thousand arrobas of dried beef were sold, a product that would soon take the lead in the Province's economy.

The French naturalist Auguste de Saint-Hilaire, who visited the place in 1820, left an extensive and rich description of life in the small town in the first decades of the 19th century. He began by praising the pleasant aspect of the landscape and the mild climate, which reminded him of the best regions in Europe. As he entered the city, he was surprised by its movement, its varied commerce, the elegance of its mansions, the picturesque roads and suburbs, and the small population of black people. At the same time, he found the poverty of the public buildings strange and was disgusted by the filth of the streets. He also reported other problems, which occurred despite the goodwill of the captaincy's governor, the Count of Figueira, such as the delay in soldiers' wages, the inefficient judicial system, and the administrative and social confusion generated by the arbitrary actions of military chiefs against the population, who took possession of other people's income and property, often violently. He got to know typical foods such as the region's barbecue and pine nuts, and, being well received by the authorities, he got to know a little of the social life of the elite, who used to gather for parties, dinners, and soirees, which reveals some cultural life flourishing already at this time:

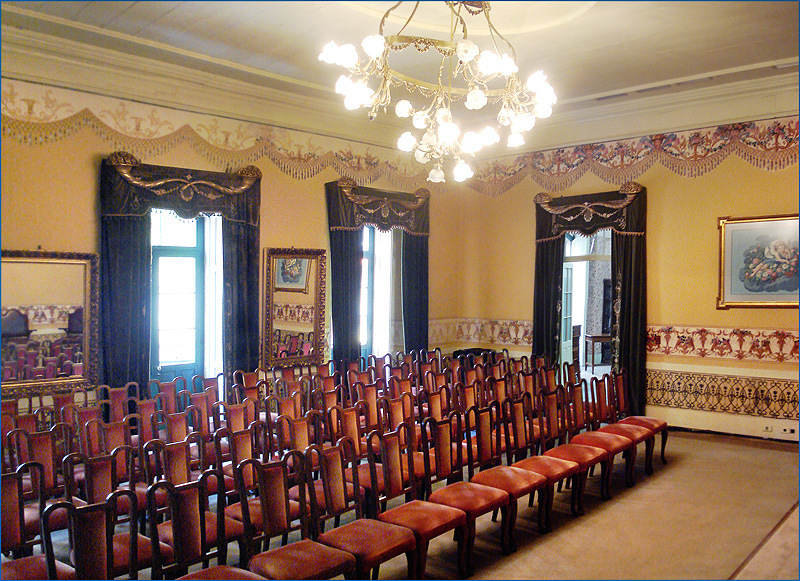
The noble hall of the Solar dos Câmara, built between 1818 and 1824, cultural center where recitals are held to recreate the atmosphere of the old Porto Alegre elite soirees.

...I found a gathering of thirty to forty people, men and women, in a well-furnished hall lined with French paper. As these were relatives and close friends, there was no luxury in attire. The women were dressed simply and decently; most of the young men wore tails and white pants. They danced waltzes, contradances, and Spanish dances; some of the ladies played the piano, others sang beautifully accompanied by guitar, and the soiree ended with ballroom games. I found different manners in all the people of the society. The ladies talked to the men without embarrassment; the men surrounded them with kindness, but they did not show any concern or desire to please, a quality, by the way, that is almost exclusive to the French. Since I have been in Brazil I have not seen a similar gathering. In the countryside, as I have said hundreds of times, women hide away; they are the first slaves of the house, and the men have no idea of the pleasures that can be enjoyed with decency. Among the ladies, whom I saw at Mr. Patricio's house, there were some beautiful ones, mostly very white, with dark brown hair and black eyes; some were graceful, but without that vivacity that characterizes French women. The men, generally very light in color and with hair and eyes the same color as the women's, were large and well made, resourceful, but without the gentleness that characterizes the miners.

On April 26, 1821 the first public manifestation of political contestation broke out in the city, when the Chamber, disobeying the determinations of the Portuguese Constitution that had been sworn by the Regent Prince Dom Pedro, elected a ministerial board, which governed from February 22 to March 8, 1822. On April 14 of this year, by decree of D. Pedro I, the town became a city. Two years later the first German immigrants arrived in the city, as part of the Crown's project to promote colonization in the south, and to help in the local agriculture. They were received with honors in the capital and soon were provided with equipment to start their farms, along with lots of lands in the Real Feitoria do Linho Cânhamo, which had been deactivated, although some remained near the urban area, giving rise to the neighborhood of Navegantes. In 1831, new city limits were established through the publication of the first Municipal Ordinances, dealing in particular with the urban police. Arsène Isabelle, visiting the city between 1833 and 1834, reported that there were already five churches, but only two elementary schools. On the other hand, several newspapers circulated, and he noted the influence of French culture and the political division between the monarchists and the Farroupilha, who defended a republican government project.

=== The Farroupilha Revolution ===
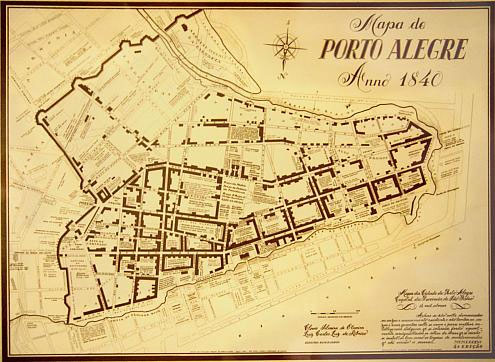
Map of Porto Alegre in 1840; on the left, the line of fortifications.

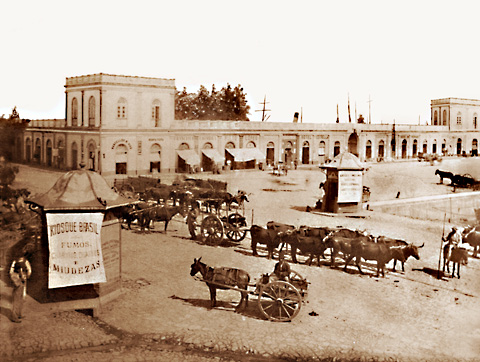
Luigi Terragno: Public Market around 1875, after the first expansion.

The economic situation of the Captaincy, however, was not good. According to Riopardense de Macedo,

In the last years before Independence, a tax on charque had already reduced exports from 120,790 arrobas in 1818 to only 27,457 in 1822. Around the same time, wheat production was also declining, not only because of the plague of rust, but also because of the farmers' biggest plague, which was the official debts, the non-payment of the part that the government collected. Schools, roads, bridges, rights, justice, were not provided. The governmental authority was felt at the estancias and river crossings with the collection of tithes and tolls....

On September 20, 1835, as a result of economic and political dissatisfaction, and culminating a series of disagreements with the central government, a republican and separatist revolt, the Farroupilha Revolution, broke out in the city. The first combat took place in the old Azenha Bridge, and the following day the city was occupied by the revolutionary forces, led by colonels Gomes Jardim and Onofre Pires. On the 25th, General Bento Gonçalves solemnly entered the city, and the City Council and the Provincial Legislative Assembly gave possession to the new President, Dr. Marciano Pereira Ribeiro, after the previous president of the province, Antônio Rodrigues Fernandes Braga, fled. Porto Alegre was under revolutionary rule until June 15, 1836, when the legalist Major Manoel Marques de Souza, later Count of Porto Alegre, managed to restore the city to the Empire.

During the period, several modifications were imposed on the city's routine and a reform in the Municipal Ordinances was elaborated, in order to organize the life of the residents and provide the necessary defense. Porto Alegre managed to resist all the sieges (one in 1836, another between 1837 and early 1838, and the last between June 1838 and December 1840) and attacks of the farroupilhas, remaining faithful to the imperial government. For this reason, the city received from Emperor Dom Pedro II, on October 19, 1841, the title of Loyal and Valiant, which to this day appears on its coat of arms. However, in the middle of the war, newspapers reported the arrival of technical and artistic novelties in Porto Alegre from Europe, making it possible to build a new theater, the D. Pedro II Theater, to replace the deactivated opera house, and also a large public market.

=== Growth ===
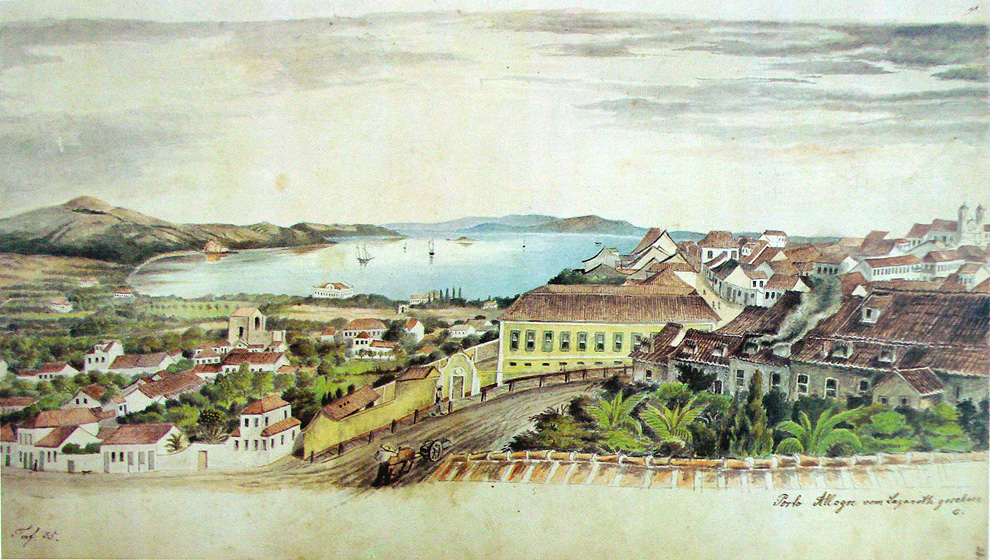
Herrmann Wendroth: Porto Alegre, view from the heights of the Holy House towards the south, c. 1852.

Despite the population increase during the war period, the urban structure would only grow again in 1845, with the end of the Revolution and the toppling of the fortifications surrounding the city, following the normalization of the provincial panorama as a whole and the reactivation of the local economy. The importance of the city port for the circulation of people and goods throughout the Province grew in accordance with the expansion of the city, with the construction of successive improvements and embankments on the coast.

In the center, improvements were made in several public facilities, with the construction of fountains for the water supply, streets, cemeteries, a new jail, asylums, and a new City Hall, expansion of the Public Market, and structuring of medical care with the consolidation of the Santa Casa de Misericórdia and the Beneficência Portuguesa. Meanwhile, the neighboring settlements flourished in relative autonomy, with the villages of Menino Deus and Navegantes, today almost central districts, and Aldeia dos Anjos, today part of Gravataí, gaining importance.

In 1850, Joseph Hörmeyer described the city as having a large and safe harbor that could receive sailing ships of up to three masts, a functioning Lyceum, several public schools, and some private institutions. The most exciting popular festival was entrudo, the predecessor of carnival, when the population had fun playing with each other wax balls the size of oranges filled with perfume, or, when these ran out, buckets of water. The chronicler writes:

There, neither sex, nor social position, nor age counts; everyone must follow this game or close their houses and windows tightly.... We have been assured that in Rua da Praia, these disputes reach such a point that gentlemen and ladies push each other, in the end, into the river, which is very shallow here, and despite their refined toilette and silk dresses, trench coats and patent boots, they get duly wet.

Religious celebrations were also very popular. Hörmeyer himself reported that during the Burning of Judas on Holy Saturday, several life-size dolls in various costumes were hung from trees to serve as scapegoats. The heads, arms, legs and bellies were stuffed with tow and explosives, and then the figures were beaten and set on fire, to the delight of the population. Another foreigner, Marie Van Langendonck, narrated other social and religious habits of the town, saying:

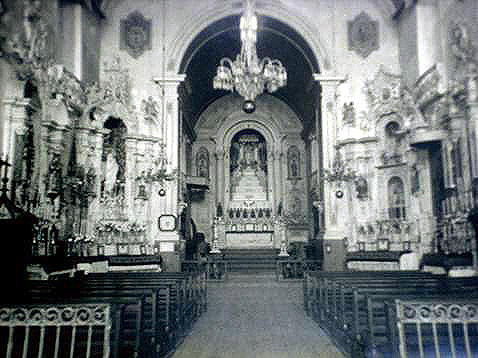
Aspect of the interior of the old Mother Church, in one of its last photos before it was demolished to make way for the current Cathedral.

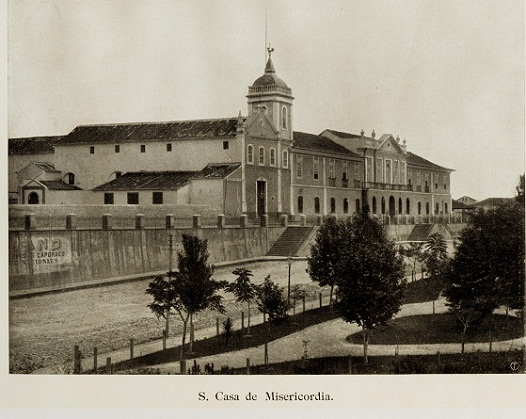
Virgilio Calegari: The Santa Casa at the end of the XIX century.

On Holy Thursday.... the churches are in celebration.... Their lighting dazzles, the doors open wide and let in the noises of the street tumult. The ladies in resplendent clothing draw attention by the neckline of their dress that uncovers their shoulders.... look like they are ready for the ball. They sit on the floor even though they are sumptuously dressed. Some sit on the altar steps, turning their backs on the Tabernacle; there they chat, laugh, eat sweets, and certainly none think of the solemnity of the day.... On this day, for them, the church is a meeting place where they find their acquaintances, show off a new silk dress, and combine how to review themselves in the Good Friday and Resurrection processions. The latter is held on the night from Saturday to Easter Sunday. No one goes to bed during this night. The procession leaves at midnight and enters at four in the morning; a huge crowd accompanies it. Wherever it passes, the windows of the houses are open and garnished with spectators. From all parts of the city fireworks are set off.

The most tragic note of these years was the cholera epidemic that broke out in the city in 1855, killing more than 1,400 people, which would be repeated ten years later, but with fewer deaths. Since then, the city's economy has diversified with the installation of restaurants, boarding houses, small manufacturing plants, distilleries, and various commercial establishments, in addition to the outstanding contribution of German immigrants in the most varied tasks.

Around 1860, there were only about twenty thousand inhabitants in the city. Among these, at least 3,000 were Germans, who quickly managed to achieve a comfortable standard of living. Their families were very close-knit, disciplined and cooperative with each other, which made it possible to form an influential cultural nucleus within the capital, doing press and holding theater performances and classical music concerts in their native language, where an audience of educated people, enthusiastic about the arts, "well-dressed and even beautiful.... Lovely ladies and gentlemen. Blonde hair streaked with a few shades, clear blue eyes and red cheeks - you could see them everywhere. Some young girls carefully carried their little sisters on their laps and visibly gave them good lessons, while the little ones' eyes moved like firecrackers and fireflies," as Avé-Lallemant vividly recalled in 1858.

Between 1865 and 1870, the Paraguayan War transformed Porto Alegre into the closest city to the operational center. The city received money from the central government, as well as telegraph service, new shipyards, barracks, and improvements in the port area. During the War, the city was visited by Emperor Dom Pedro II on his way to Uruguaiana, where he went to receive the surrender of the Paraguayans.

In 1872, the first streetcar lines started running; in 1874, coal gas lighting was inaugurated and the Porto Alegre-Novo Hamburgo railroad was completed. The water supply was also improved with the beginning of distribution through pipes, with more than two thousand homes already served by the end of the 1870s. A sewage system, however, would have to wait until the end of the century to be implemented.

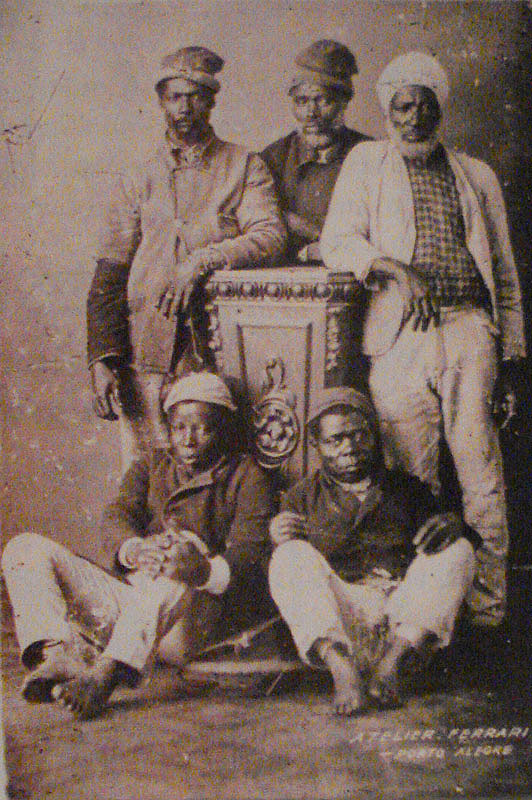
Newly freed slaves in 1884.

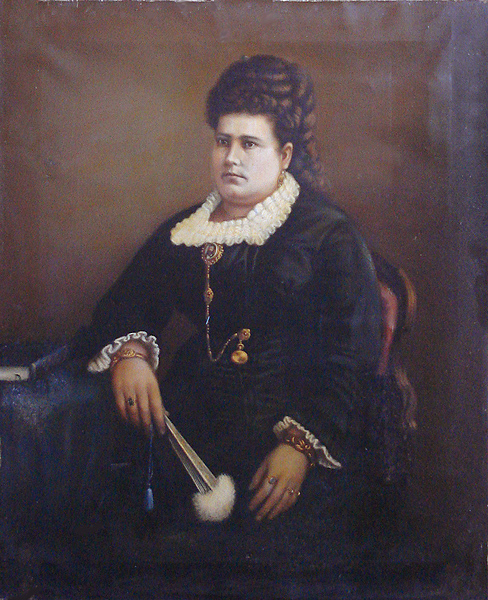
Unidentified benefactress of the Beneficência Portuguesa, a perfect representative of the Porto Alegre elite at the end of the 19th century. Artistic collection of the Beneficência Portuguesa of Porto Alegre.

The 1880s were characterized by the advance of the conurbation process of the historic center with the neighboring villages. The intermediate areas began to be valued for subdivisions, and the nuclei of the future neighborhoods Floresta, Bom Fim, Independência, Moinhos de Vento and several others emerged. The political and social discussion in the city was also already acquiring considerable strength, with active political parties and several opinion newspapers in circulation, such as A Democracia and A Federação, of republican ideals. This excitement resulted in 1884 in the liberation of the city's slaves, four years before the Golden Law.

Porto Alegre was also becoming home to a few Italian immigrant families, who had come in the colonizing wave that was concentrated in the General Mountains, and to unadapted Poles who had originally settled in the interior of the state. Soon, both groups were founding societies and organizing themselves, with Arthur de Andrade as editor, Marcílio Freitas as managing editor, and the defense of the interests of their ethnic group and the improvement of knowledge as a program; meanwhile, black people couldn't even create and run their own newspaper.

=== Cultural refinement and diversification ===
In the second half of the century, Porto Alegre's erudite culture showed a significant advance. The elite had already matured to the point of maintaining varied interests in art and nurturing a significant cultural life, where the first local intellectuals and educators of real merit shone, such as Antônio Vale Caldre Fião, Hilário Ribeiro, Luciana de Abreu, who were joined by others from outside, such as Apolinário Porto-Alegre, Inácio Montanha and Karl von Koseritz. Several of them participated in the important Literary Parthenon Society, active since 1868, formed by intellectuals from Rio Grande do Sul. Its performance was not only limited to the dissemination of literature, but also expanded the local culture by offering evening courses for adults, creating a library with works of Philosophy, History and Literature and a museum with sections of Mineralogy, Archeology, Numismatics and Zoology. The night classes were one of the Society's longest-lasting activities, being offered until 1884, when they were suspended due to financial difficulties and lack of a place to house the classes. The Society participated in abolitionist campaigns, raising funds to free slaves, and propagated republican ideals. It also promoted debates with diverse themes such as the Farroupilha Revolution, marriage, the death penalty, and feminism. It published several literary works, as well as the traditional Revista Literária, its strongest legacy. The magazine circulated for ten years and contained literary criticism, biographies, commentaries, editorials, and studies on local history and culture, speeches given at the Society, as well as short stories, narratives, plays, and poetry.

In 1875, the first arts salon was held, as a section of the Great Commercial and Industrial Exhibition, a heterogeneous show where paintings, drawings, decorative art and domestic gifts were exhibited, with the participation of many women. At the same time, the first commercial art gallery was opened and the first idea to create an arts school in Porto Alegre emerged, based on a proposal by the set designer Oreste Coliva that was warmly welcomed by the press; however, the project, too ambitious for the historical moment, did not prosper. The influx of French and German influences provided additional cultural elements to trigger the first modern renovation movements in the field of art in the capital, which in 1880 already had more than 40 thousand inhabitants but was still constructing houses and large buildings in the old, deep-rooted colonial style, such as the Church of Our Lady of the Conception, a project by João do Couto e Silva completed that same year.

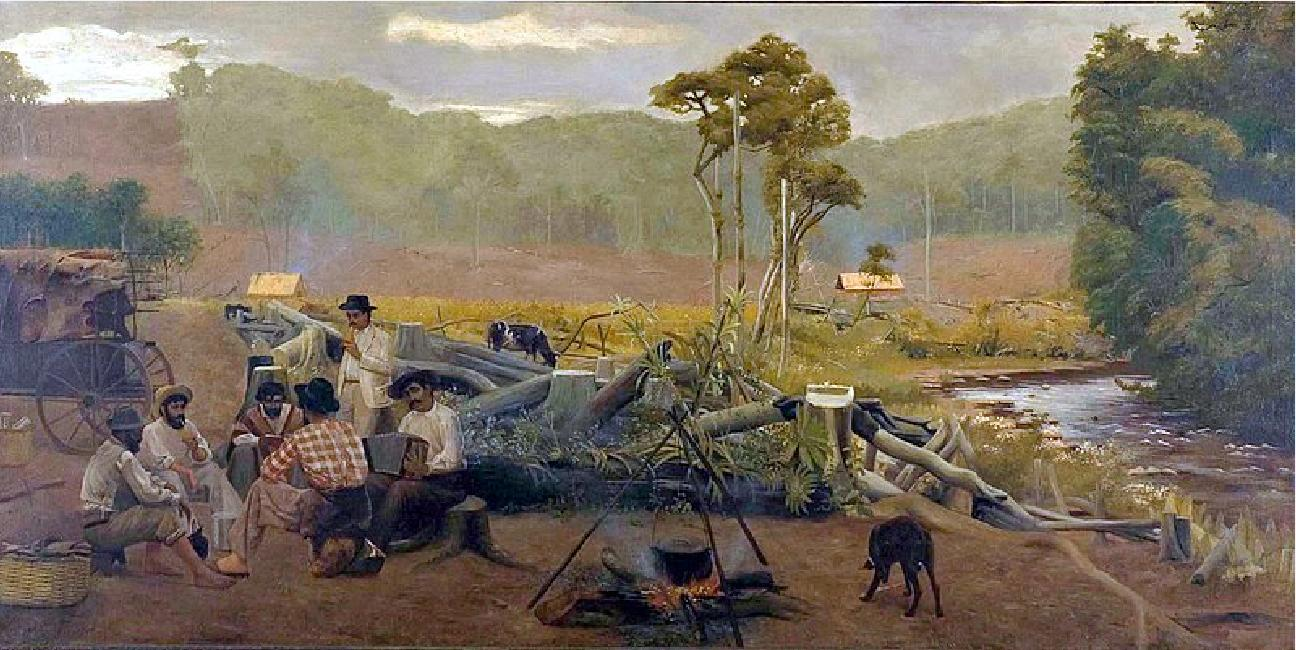
Pedro Weingärtner: Carreteiros gaúchos chimarreando, 1911. Aldo Locatelli Art Gallery.

The city's artistic yearnings, however, would soon emerge in Pedro Weingärtner, a descendant of German immigrants, the first local painter to achieve recognition abroad. He was a convinced academic artist, trained in Europe, sponsored by Dom Pedro II personally, and author of a work that is divided between bourgeois and urban scenes, the romantic recreation of classicist mythological idylls and, what is perhaps his most perennial contribution, regionalist scenes in a realistic and meticulous style, sometimes almost photographic. He was the most erudite and talented painter of his generation from Porto Alegre, and the most successful and celebrated artist in the city until shortly before his death in 1929, although he spent a lot of time in Italy, where he kept another studio.

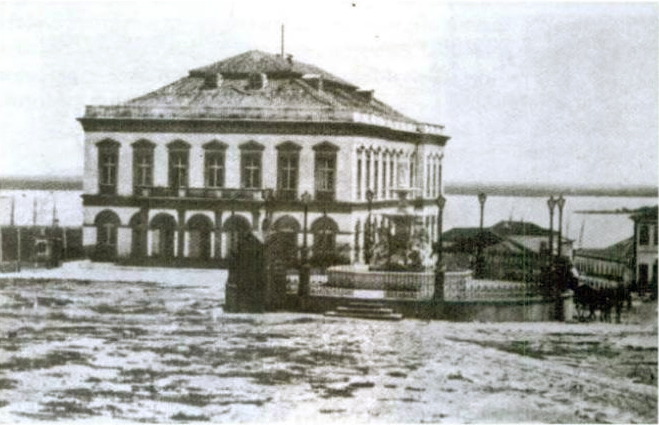
São Pedro Theater in 1860.

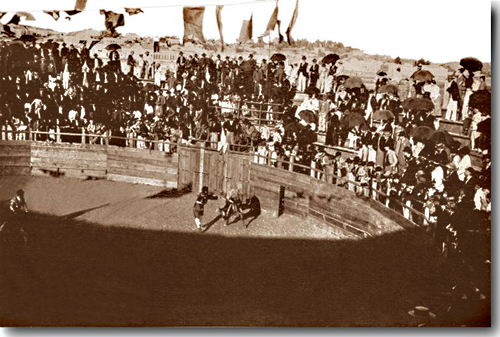
Virgilio Calegari: The Bullfighting Circus.

Other areas of the arts were also showing vitality, such as music. Some musical training had become a mandatory part of the elite's education, and public and private festivals always made use of music, with many instrumental groups and teachers already active. The most notable figure of this phase was master Joaquim Mendanha, a former member of the Royal Chapel of Rio de Janeiro, teacher and founder of the Sociedade Musical de Beneficência Porto-Alegrense, in addition to being the Chapel Master of the Mother Church. This period also saw the opening of the São Pedro Theater, a grand opera house, and the founding of the Sociedade Filarmônica Porto-Alegrense, to finance a music school and organize concerts for its members.

Bullfighting and cycling, where social classes were mixed, were among the most popular attractions of the late 19th century. Bullfights have been recorded since the 1880s, taking place in the Bullfighting Circus, where today is the Farroupilha Park. Apparently, the bull was not sacrificed at the end of the show, which would be summarized in a dramatic staging, interspersed with pantomime scenes. According to the newspapers of the time, the influx of people every Sunday was so great that it seemed like a real "flood". During the intervals there were circus acts of all kinds, with gymnasts, magicians, and singers. Starting in 1896, the arena was also the stage for the presentation of cinematographs in night sessions. The cinema, which had arrived that year, was one of those responsible for the rapid decline of bullfighting, leading to the deactivation of the Bullfighting Circus in 1910, while movie theaters multiplied. During the popularization of bullfighting, cycling stopped being just a curiosity and became a fashion. By the end of the century there were several amateur cycling societies and two velodromes. Since cycling equipment was expensive, it was a sport primarily practiced by the elite, although races in the velodromes also attracted large crowds of the people.

== Castilhismo and the push for progress ==
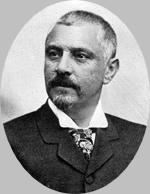
Júlio de Castilhos, a dominant figure in the state at the turn of the century.

The Proclamation of the Republic was received with great surprise by the people of Porto Alegre; soon afterwards, the political situation in the state became confused, causing rivalries and institutional problems, such as the one that occurred on June 12, 1892, when there were two presidents in charge of the state government at the same time, with a third president taking over temporarily. In 1893, tension exploded in the Federalist Revolution, which aimed to "liberate Rio Grande do Sul from the tyranny of Júlio de Castilhos," then the State President, who had initiated reforms and imposed a State Constitution with positivist ideas. The fighting did not reach the city, but it divided opinion dramatically. It ended with the triumph of Júlio de Castilhos and the breakdown of the opposition, although not all voices were silent. In 1897, he was succeeded by his disciple Borges de Medeiros, who would govern until 1928. The predominance of Júlio de Castilhos' politics, the so-called Castilhismo, was decisive in the directions Porto Alegre would take during the first half of the next century, with several municipal intendants succeeding each other under the same ideological affiliation and consolidating a regime that, although autocratic, had significant success in managing an inefficient administrative inheritance, establishing the foundations for the accelerated progress of the early 20th century, even though this progress would come at a high social price. However, in the words of Charles Monteiro,

As important as the new political order, was the population growth and the progress of industrialization that began in the city in the 1890s.... the population growth rate went from 2.5% to 3.4% per year. In 1900, the population census indicated a population of 73,474 in Porto Alegre. The German and Italian immigration, the development of commercial agriculture in the highland region, the commercialization of products through the capital's port, and the construction of the first railway lines, among other factors, provided the conditions for Porto Alegre's economic growth cycle.

=== 20th Century: The First Thirty Years ===
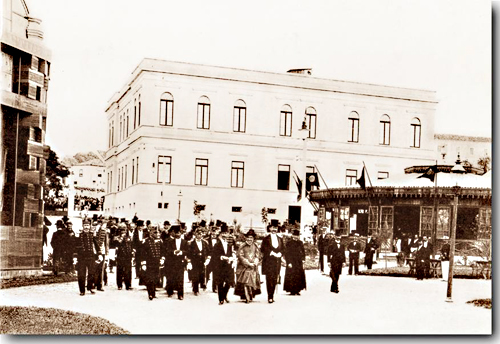
Lunara: Solemn inauguration of the 1901 Agro-Industrial Exposition by the State President Borges de Medeiros and his entourage.

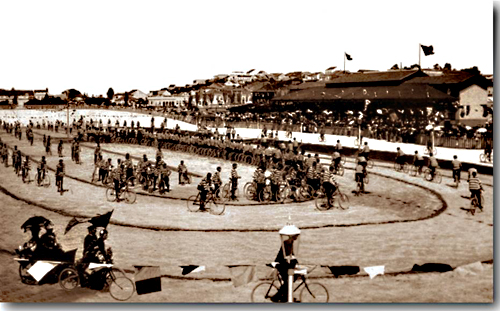
Virgilio Calegari: The velodrome, where the public used to gather to enjoy the cyclists. Until the 1920s, cycling was a sport practiced almost exclusively by the elite in Porto Alegre.

At the turn of the century, Porto Alegre began to be seen as the tourist attraction of Rio Grande do Sul, an idea perfectly aligned with the Positivist purposes, a philosophical current endorsed by the state and city governments; therefore, the city should convey an impression of order and progress. To this end, the Intendency initiated a huge program of public works supported by the state government, a circumstance favored by the 1891 Constitution, which, in practice, gave the state great power over the municipalities, to the point that Borges was able to impose changes in the Municipal Organic Laws, restricting the Intendant's role. The Governor nominated the Intendant, and Borges successively chose José Montaury to head the city, praising his ability to administer, alleviate the suffering of the poor and curb the greed of the capitalists. In order to manage the development process better, the municipality took upon itself responsibility for many public services, such as the provision of piped water, lighting, transportation, education, policing, sanitation and social assistance, to a standard that far exceeded the custom of the time, surpassing what was done in São Paulo and Rio de Janeiro.

In order to meet the expense, the government started borrowing abroad, beginning the accumulation of significant external debt. Between 1909 and 1928, the city borrowed 600,000 pounds sterling plus almost 10 million dollars, as well as having to bear the cost of hiring a large number of new public employees. This government program, called Plano Geral de Melhoramentos (English: General Improvement Plan), also resulted in a wave of monumental public constructions, renewing the urban landscape according to the aesthetics of eclecticism, which, under the influence of the prestigious German community, was quickly imitated by the wealthy elite for the construction of their new palaces. At this time, the port was expanded in a vast and ambitious project, and some of the most significant and luxurious public buildings of the capital were erected in the so-called "golden phase" of the architecture of Porto Alegre. Some of these buildings are loaded with ethical, social and political symbolism, which was most prominently revealed in the allegorical decoration of the facades. Some examples of this trend are the Old City Hall, the Public Library, the Post and Telegraph Office, and the Tax Police Station, most of them built by the partnership between architect Theodor Wiederspahn, engineer Rudolf Ahrons, and decorator João Vicente Friedrichs, all of German origin.

This urbanistic evolution accompanied the emergence of a new bourgeois culture stimulated by the influx of new migrants and immigrants, now including Jews, Spaniards, English, French, Platinians and others, by the introduction of new technologies in transportation and engineering, and by the consolidation of a capitalist elite, which made sociability and urban spaces more complex, exclusive and diverse. At the same time, industry was becoming stronger and was beginning to definitively replace handicrafts and manufactures, and Porto Alegre was consolidating itself as the commercial center of the entire state.

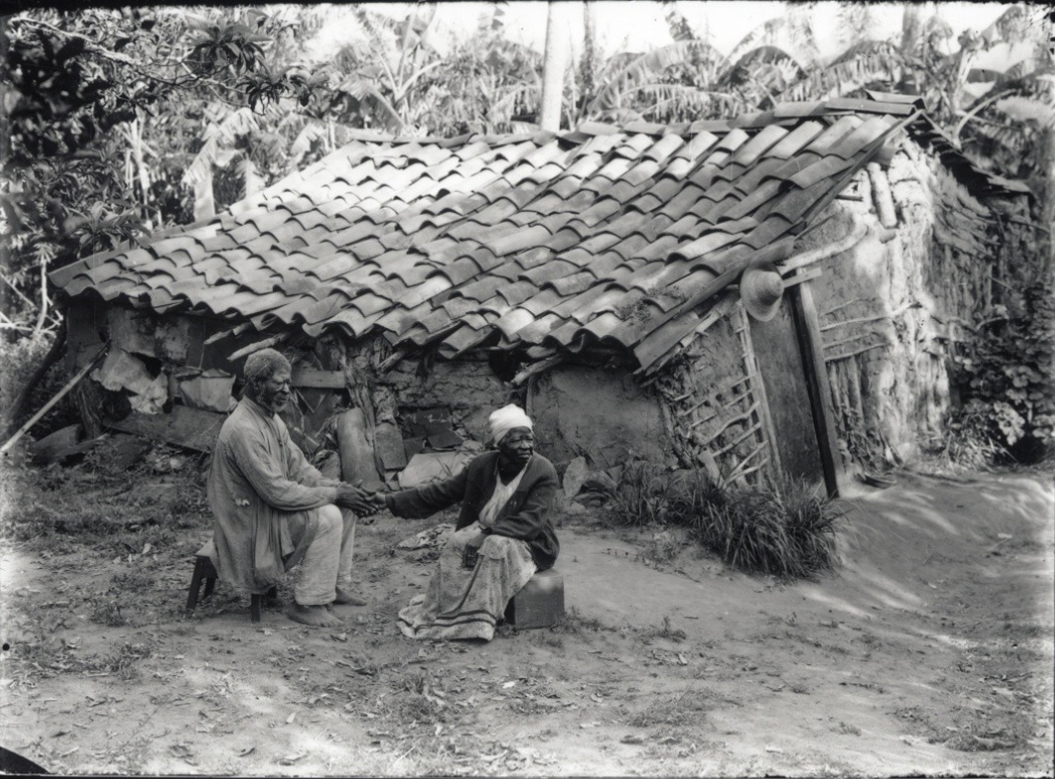
Lunara: Blacks from Porto Alegre in misery in the 1900s.

However, the investments of the public administration were concentrated in the area limited by districts 1, 2 and 3, the surroundings of the historic center, while the new working class neighborhoods, such as São João and Navegantes, were neglected in infrastructure improvements. Despite undeniable and significant advances, the Castilhista administration was the target of much criticism, both for its inconsistencies, such as the failure in popular housing, and for its dogmatic and conservative continuism, although Montaury was highly respected for his administrative probity and esteemed as a person.

The social cost of so much progress and so many large-scale public undertakings was equally great. Workers' protests had been registered since the end of the 19th century, and in 1906, the first general strike of the workers broke out in the city. As Petersen analyzed, the prevailing idea was that the social question in Brazil had not yet manifested itself with the severity it did in other countries, but it was already known that the very heavy working conditions in industry at the turn of the century, not only in Porto Alegre but throughout Brazil, were potentially generating social conflicts. In fact, sometimes they even resembled slavery, with men and women forced to work in unhealthy environments, with a long working day, receiving low wages and suffering intimidation, humiliation, various deprivations, and even physical punishment from their bosses and foremen. Children were not spared and worked almost as adults, but were paid even less and were beaten frequently.

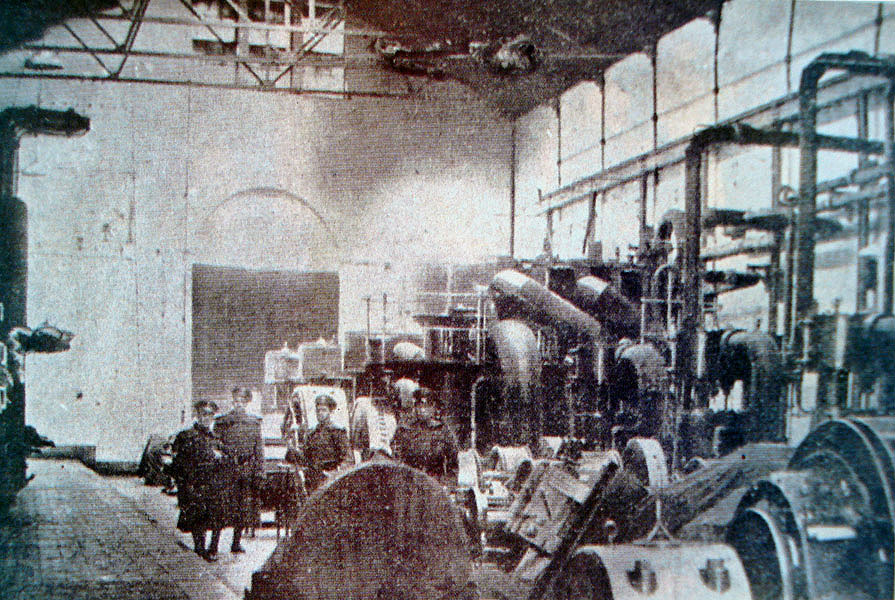
Factory guarded by the Intendencia militia during the strikes of 1917.

Although the politicians were already aware of the tension that was building up between workers and businessmen, the official publicity, trying to co-opt the malcontents to its own cause, offered its ufanistic version of the events; on one hand it praised them saying that the labor force was "the active and permanent force in the bosom of the vast workshops that produce industrial progress. ... and lived in happy harmony with a regime that assures them equality, as perfect as that practiced in the most advanced societies," but he also made a point of emphasizing the peaceful character of our people and claimed that in Porto Alegre "there is no lack of work for those who have a determined will to work".

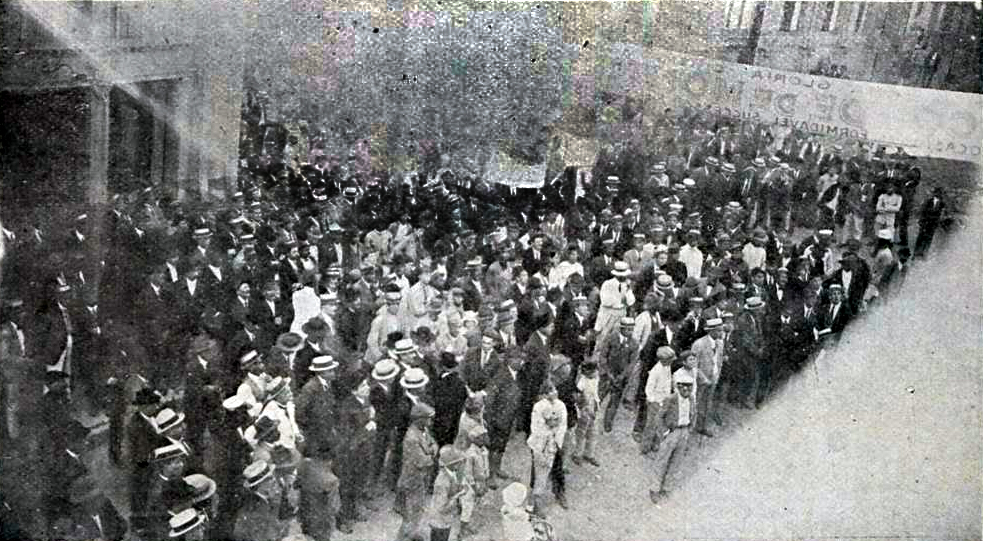
Workers' march in 1919.

Not surprisingly, the founding of a workers' party in Porto Alegre in 1908 was seen by the dominant and conservative sectors, including the Catholic Church, as a threat to the "public spirit", condemned in the press as a false utopia, a chimera inspired by despised Socialism, recommending to the workers calm, order, and prudence. The movement, although colored by various ideological strands that sometimes conflicted, was strong and united enough to immediately aggregate the majority of the working class and radiate throughout the state, assuming critical political relevance. Other strikes followed in quick succession: bakers in 1913, marble workers in 1914, bricklayers and bakers in 1915, bricklayers, weavers, shoemakers and bakers in 1916. The mood among workers in the city was one of general discontent, at the same time that the Intendency, alarmed, reinforced the police force.

Other opinions, on the other hand, praised the courageous initiatives of the workers, placing in them great hopes for labor and social reform, and called for the comprehensive participation of the ruling class in this process, even for their own benefit. The dissatisfaction of the opponents of Castilhismo finally became extreme in the violent Revolution of 1923, which attempted to remove Borges from power amid a severe state economic crisis and evidence of electoral fraud. Borges remained, but the State Constitution was reformed, removing the Governor's power to appoint Intendants and preventing his reelection for two consecutive terms. Therefore, in 1924, José Montaury gave way to Otávio Rocha. At this time, Porto Alegre already had 190 thousand inhabitants.

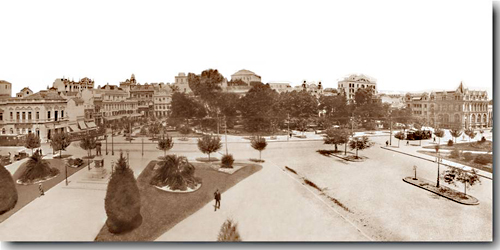
Panoramic view of the reurbanized Alfândega Square, in 1929.

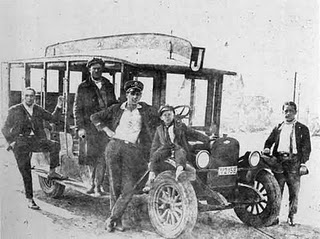
The first bus in Porto Alegre, 1926.

However, the continuity of the political philosophy was assured. Otávio Rocha was also a castilhista, and he strove even harder for the reform of the city, wanting to transform it into a "new Paris". Urban design was already being determined by the number of vehicles circulating. In 1927, there were already 3,000 cars in Porto Alegre, fewer only than the fleet in São Paulo. Its program emphasized the circulation aspect, with the construction of wide avenues, boulevards and roundabouts, and for this, especially in the central area, dozens of old houses and decaying tenements that symbolized poverty and backwardness were knocked down; at the same time several other public facilities and services were built. These reforms, however, increased the capital's indebtedness, forcing the creation of a series of new taxes: on professions, entertainment, commerce and industry, charity, the maintenance of streets and roads, garbage collection services, and the gauging of weights and measures.

A campaign of moral sanitation of the center was also started, combating prostitution, begging, gambling, and alcoholism. At this point, the historic center justified renovation because it already seemed degraded, causing the elite to abandon it as a place to live and move their residences to new areas such as the future neighborhoods Independência and Moinhos de Vento. The creation of several peripheral subdivisions and the installation of bus lines have also contributed to a new urban distribution.

=== Culture under Castilhismo ===
There were also notable achievements in culture in the first thirty years of the 20th century. According to Maria Teresa Baptista, "positivist ideals were not restricted to the spheres of politics and religion, but also influenced the cultural field". As a result, the Polytheama Theater (1898), the State Archive (1906), and many other establishments that showed the government's interest in the various areas of social and intellectual life of the Republican state were inaugurated.

In 1901, the Rio-Grandense Academy of Letters was founded, gathering many journalists, poets, and writers, such as Caldas Júnior, Marcelo Gama, Alcides Maia, and Mário Totta. Soon after, the first museum in the state was founded, the Júlio de Castilhos Museum, created in 1903 to house objects that had been collected since 1901 and were stored in the pavilions built for the 1st Agricultural and Industrial Exhibition. In the same year occurred the first event entirely dedicated to the arts, the Salon of 1903, promoted by the Gazeta do Commercio. This Salon, according to Athos Damasceno, was "the first contest to give the arts in Rio Grande do Sul a statute of autonomy ... legitimizing them as objects of approval and social distinction".

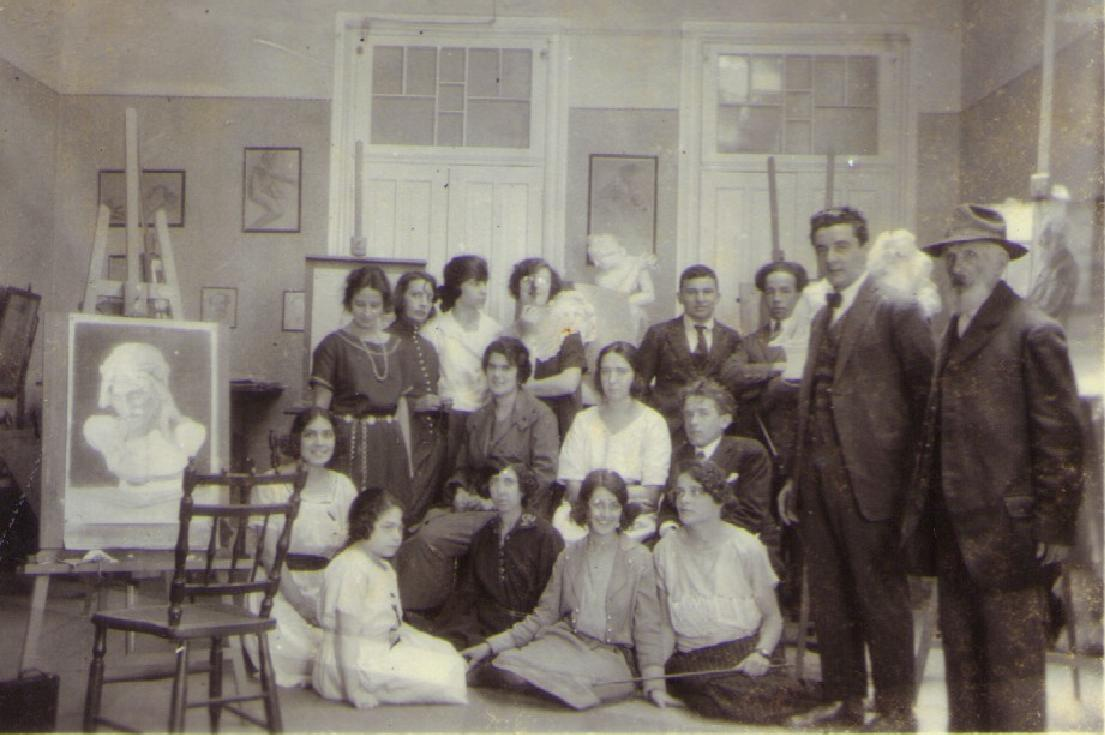
Students at the Art Institute atelier in 1925, with professors Luis Augusto de Freitas, Libindo Ferrás and Francis Pelichek.

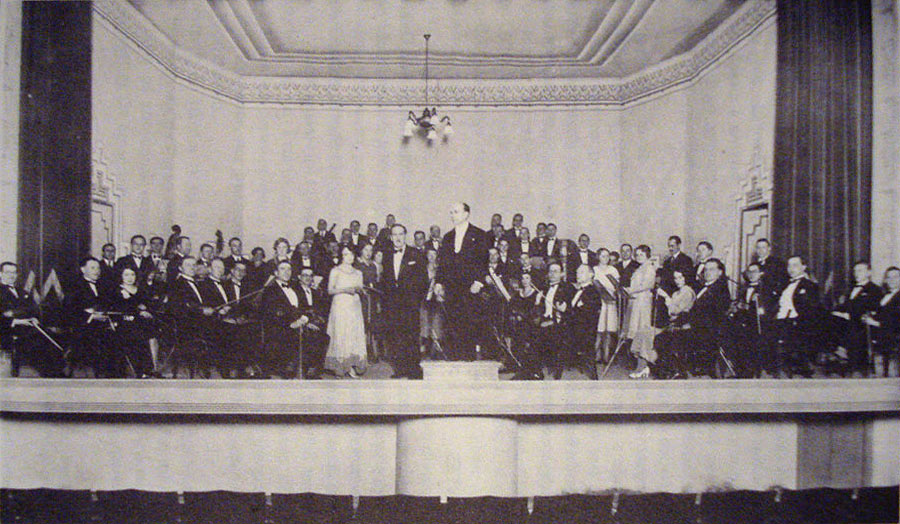
Club Haydn concert in 1931.

Another milestone was the founding of the Fine Arts Institute in 1908, the predecessor of the current Institute of Arts at the Federal University of Rio Grande do Sul (UFRGS), including courses in music and fine arts, which concentrated art production in the capital and was practically the only significant institutional reference in the state until the mid-1950s in the fields of art study, teaching, and production. The Institute "was created by art amateurs as a culmination of the civilizing project formed by free higher education schools and that constituted the origin of the first university in the region", but soon professionals would join and "assume their condition of agents, starting to express the autonomy of art, making use of its institutional place". Some of the most notorious names in local painting of the beginning of the century taught at the Institute, such as Oscar Boeira, Libindo Ferrás and João Fahrion, along with outside artists such as Eugênio Latour, Francis Pelichek and Luiz Maristany de Trias, preparing a mostly female student body.

In music, the Club Haydn, formed mostly by amateurs, played an important role by organizing many recitals, promoting European and Brazilian authors. It complemented the seasons at the São Pedro Theater, where stars such as Arthur Rubinstein and Magda Tagliaferro performed and the first opera of the state, Carmela, by José de Araújo Viana, was staged. A qualified musical education was provided by the Fine Arts Institute, where Viana himself, together with Max Brückner, Tasso Corrêa, and Olinto de Oliveira were active. In 1925, the Porto Alegre Municipal Band was created, quickly becoming a public favorite, performing concerts of erudite repertoire outdoors and in theaters. In the same year, the Porto-Alegrense Musical Center appeared, which associated practically all the city's music professionals, giving rise to the Symphonic Concert Society, in 1927, and, in the following decade, to the first union in the category.

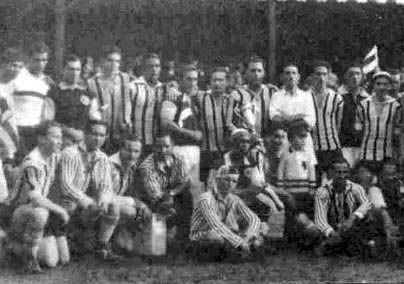
Gremio's team in 1932, state champion.

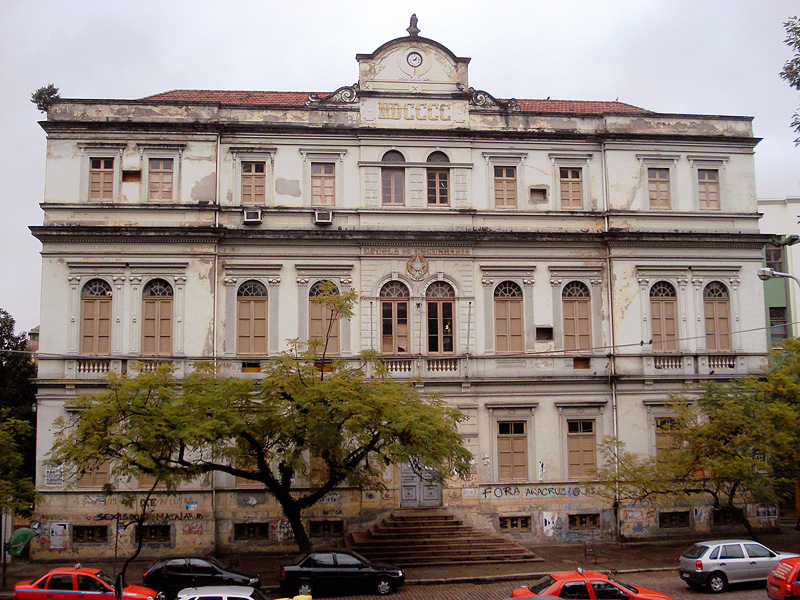
Old headquarters of the School of Engineering, now part of the historic buildings of UFRGS.

More important names in literature and poetry appear, such as Augusto Meyer, Dyonélio Machado, and Eduardo Guimarães, who, together with the State Public Library, re-inaugurated with major expansions in 1922, contributed significantly to boosting local culture. Cinema was becoming hegemonic in the sociocultural scene, despite the criticism it received for supposedly being an "inferior art" and a "school of vices", and causing the degeneration of the population's artistic "good taste". The sport already had clubs such as Grêmio and Internacional, which would be major forces in Brazilian soccer years later.

The activity of the first colleges, installed at the end of the 19th century, was also beginning to bear positive results: Pharmacy and Chemistry in 1895, Engineering in 1896, Medicine in 1898 and Law in 1900. As a result, another social category started to stand out: the students. In Nilo Ruschel's account, the student, generally belonging to the elite, intended through higher education, to rise socially, dedicating himself later to politics, civil service, and liberal professions, and in this way...

.... would emerge, raising its head above the masses of people. He sought to stand out from the ordinary people by his own values, when he no longer needed to seek the doctor's degree in São Paulo, Rio or Recife. There was no university, but the university spirit was already born.... a select group of young people, restless and combative.... In the language, the frontier accent predominated. Like a creeping grass, it sprang up among the stones of the street, like a native panache, a pride of caste, tempered by the gurgling of the minuano. And this insinuated itself in attempts to externalize, to identify.

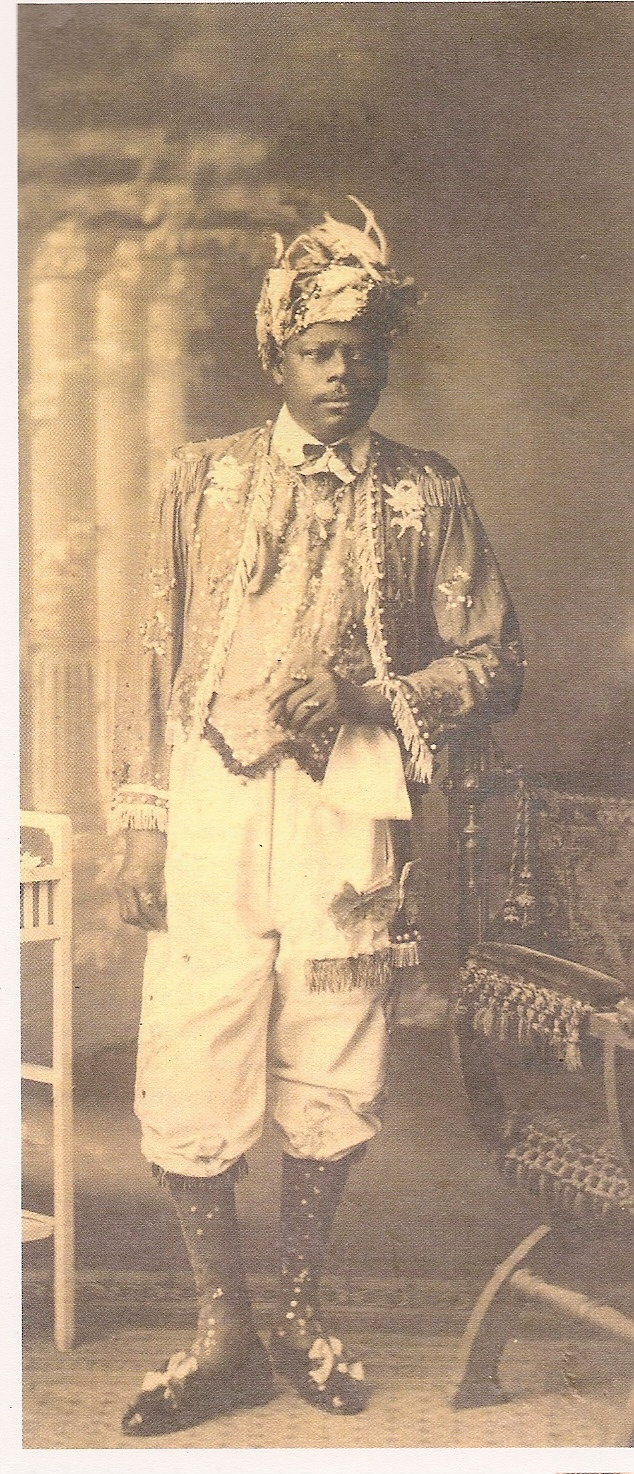
Prince Custodio.

The popular culture was also transformed by the significant influx of immigrants from various parts of the world, who contributed to give Porto Alegre a more cosmopolitan appearance, but were also the cause of several conflicts with the old residents. The influence of the immigrants manifested itself in many ways, from the introduction of new cooking habits to the popularization of new slang, with the formation of communities with their own customs. The chronicles of the time mention several popular characters well known in the city, such as "Ratinho", a travelling musician and street performer, "pretinho Adão", a newspaper seller who displayed his acrobatic skills and was always accompanied by the blind "Alemãozinho", and "Maria Chorona", a personification of the women from the lower classes who fought for survival in small street trades, heirs to the tradition of the greengrocers and washerwomen and who earned their nickname for the complaining or sensationalist style of their sermons. At this time, women were beginning their independence from male tutelage and gaining public space, sometimes adopting ostensibly transgressive behavior such as smoking and wearing their hair short.

Another influential popular figure in the early 20th century was Custódio Joaquim de Almeida, traditionally considered an African prince, a title that is doubted by some historians. He was an extravagant and mysterious personality who claimed to have healing powers; he knew medicinal herbs, and according to some sources, he would have given spiritual assistance, as well as advice in government affairs, to powerful politicians of the time, including Júlio de Castilhos, Borges de Medeiros, and Getúlio Vargas, which recent research considers unlikely. In any case, he was a religious and community leader with a figure surrounded by rich folklore that inspired the veneration of many. He is a reference in the history of African religions in the state and became a contemporary symbol of the anti-racist struggle and freedom of worship. When he died in 1935, a crowd attended his funeral.

=== 1930s ===
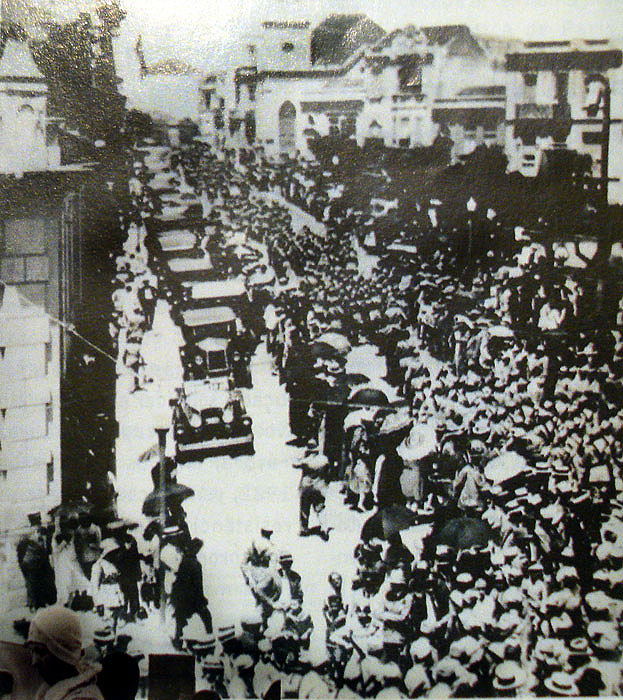
Popular demonstrations in Porto Alegre supporting the Revolution of 1930.

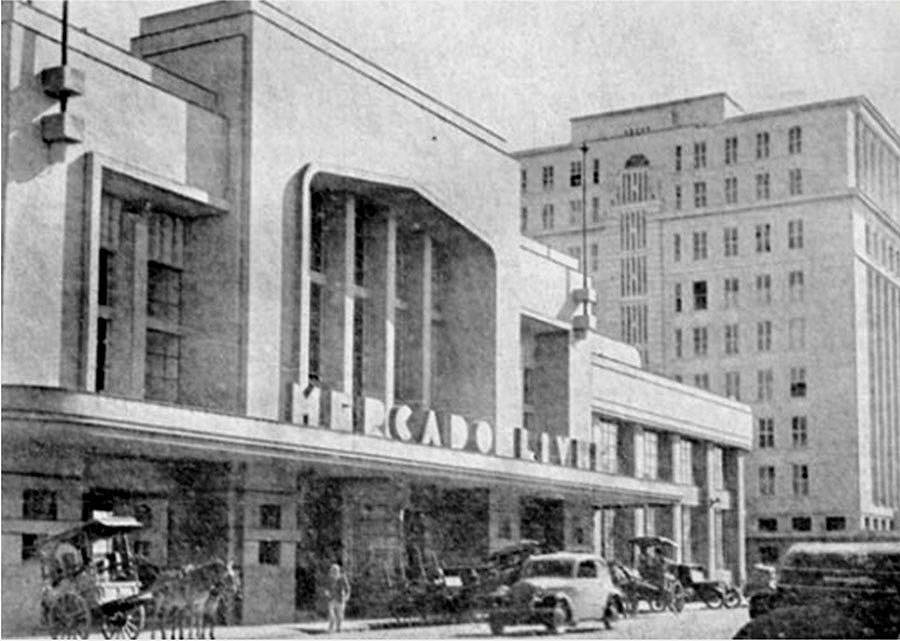
Architecture from the 1930s: the vanished Mercado Livre, and in the background the still existing Comércio Palace.

With the unexpected death of Otávio Rocha in 1928, Alberto Bins, his vice-president, took over as interim president. The city's newly opened central avenues were named Júlio de Castilhos Avenue and Borges de Medeiros Avenue. Otávio Rocha, the recently deceased intendant, was honored with a street, a square and the city's first viaduct.

When the Revolution of 1930 broke out, which put Getúlio Vargas, a native of Rio Grande do Sul, in charge of the nation and marked the end of the Old Republic, the repercussions in Porto Alegre were dramatic, with several episodes of shootings and street confrontations, an indication that the local tradition of bellicosity was still very much alive through the use of authoritarian and violent practices by the public authorities. According to Ruschel, at certain moments the city center was transformed into "a western movie set".

Even though the General Improvement Plan continued as the basis of the political administrative project of reforms and modernization, some changes were necessary. Edvaldo Paiva and Ubatuba de Faria, municipal employees, and Arnaldo Gladosch, hired in Rio de Janeiro, sketched out some attempts to reorganize the central urban fabric according to modern principles, but none were fully implemented. In parallel, another model for the city's peripheral and horizontal expansion was conceived. For several neighborhoods or residential subdivisions, the technicians proposed a local interpretation of the "garden city" prototype, with an organic layout, low-scale isolated buildings, and dense vegetation; the best examples are Vila Jardim, Vila Assunção, and Vila Conceição.

The embankment of the banks of the Guaíba river continued and the urbanization of Várzea da Redenção was started, as well as the planting of trees in other leisure areas; the streets were paved, and the water, sewage, and electricity networks were expanded. Alberto Bins had the advantage of being well connected with his influential community, being a prosperous descendant of German immigrants and the representative in front of the Republican Party and the parliament. He also had relationships with significant groups of the city's commercial and industrial bourgeoisie, which helped to improve the living conditions of the proletariat and led to the founding of a Committee to represent them and the institution of trade unions.

Another of his great works was the organization, in 1935, of the Farroupilha Revolution centennial fair, the largest general exposition Porto Alegre had seen in its entire history. The construction of these pavilions in modernist style decisively influenced the evolution of the city's architecture to the emergence of a typically local and original version of architectural Modernism. The monumental axis of the Exposition ended in a huge Exhibition Pavilion of Gaucho Industry, which was to show to all of Brazil the state's drive for modernization and progress toward the future. At this time one could already see signs of the beginning of a verticalization in the urban profile with the appearance of apartment buildings and commercial buildings. The urban network was continuously expanding and the neighborhoods Montserrat, Petrópolis and Partenon, occupied by the middle class, were emerging. Alberto Bins governed the capital until 1937. On the eve of leaving office, the city was undergoing a crisis, with a large number of taxpayers requesting a moratorium.

While Getúlio Vargas was approaching Germany, Rio Grande do Sul was increasing its exports of leather and tobacco to Germany, and the many Germans in Porto Alegre, as well as the entire colony of the state, which numbered more than 900,000 people at the time, proved to be very organized, and many became rich and achieved prominent positions in the city and throughout the interior, such as Alberto Bins himself. Even a series of newspapers in German were created for this specific public, where everything from politics to agro-industrial technologies were discussed. Porto Alegre's three German newspapers, the Vaterland, the Neue Deutsche Zeitung, and the Deutsches Volksblatt, were all pro-Nazism, to varying degrees. With the sympathies of the federal government directed toward Germany and its regime, and with the local community similarly excited, the city soon witnessed marches with battalions of uniformed youths carrying flags with the swastika cross.

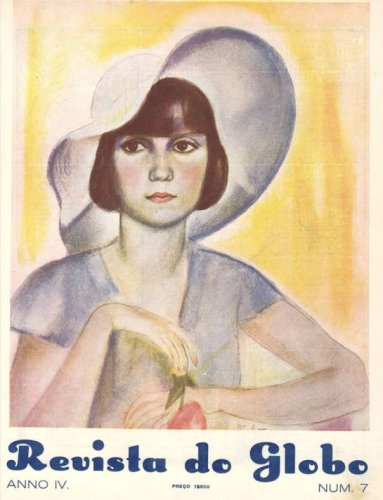
Cover of Revista do Globo, 1932, with illustration by Francis Pelichek.

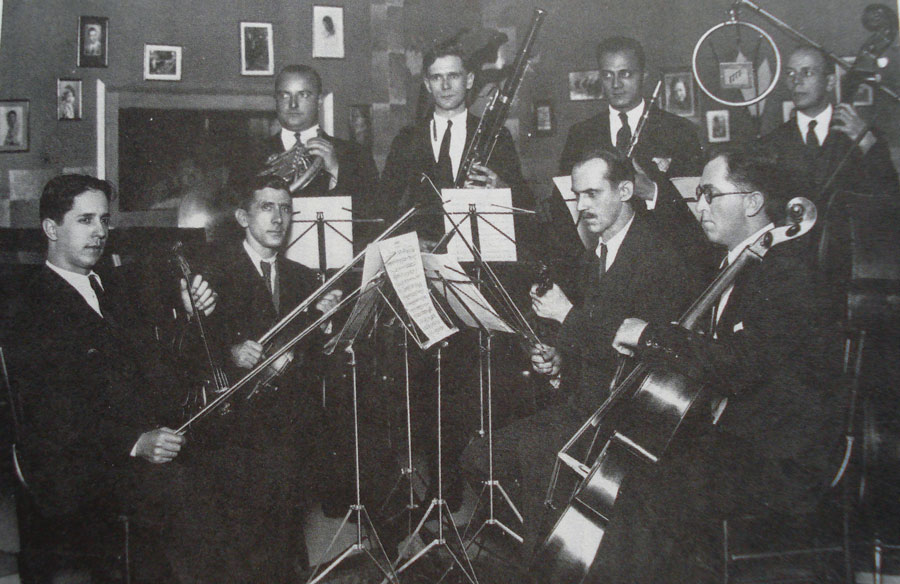
Radio broadcasting of a classical music recital by Rádio Sociedade Gaúcha in 1935.

But not everyone agreed with the course of events. Intellectuals like Erico Verissimo and Dyonélio Machado, irritated by the oppressive climate, and feeling aligned with the culture and art of the United States, founded the Brazilian North American Institute in 1938. Most of the cultural movement took place in the cafes, especially in the Central Confectionery, the Rocco Confectionery, the Chalet of the XV Square, and the Colombo Cafe. The so-called Café Colombo Group was formed, composed of some of the most prominent characters of the cultural world of that time, such as Mario Quintana, Dante de Laytano, Walter Spalding, Barbosa Lessa, Theodomiro Tostes, Moysés Vellinho, Dyonélio Machado, Pedro Wayne, Telmo Vergara, Raul Bopp, Radamés Gnatalli, Fernando Corona, and Augusto Meyer. The Central Cafe was the focal point of concentration of politicians. Cassinos and clubs offered cultural programs with music, dance and stage performances, generally of a popular character, and the São Pedro Theater continued to centralize classical music and theater.

Pedro Weingärtner died in 1929, already forgotten by the public, burying with him the tradition of strict academicism. By this time, Modernism was already stimulating an intense debate between the elite and the artists about the new directions that art was taking. The new aesthetic was introduced in Porto Alegre firstly through the graphic arts, with emphasis on the illustrations of the Revista do Globo, which had a large circulation and kept in its workshops a group of talented illustrators, some of whom later defined the profile of all the best local and state art. Among them were Ernest Zeuner, Edgar Koetz, Francis Pelichek and João Fahrion. At the same time, the Institute of Arts, where some of these artists were teaching, was also opening itself to the influx of new ideas, especially under the direction of Tasso Corrêa, starting in 1936, and then projecting itself nationally.

Radio began to play an important role in cultural dissemination, both in the popular and erudite realms, setting up radio soap operas and radio drama, live concerts, as well as serving as a forum for political debates and a source of simple, nonchalant entertainment, reaching an increasingly larger and more diverse audience. Soon it acquired a strong commercial base. In education, the creation of the statewide University of Porto Alegre, which was the predecessor of the UFRGS, while there were already large schools in operation, such as Anchieta, Júlio de Castilhos and Rosário, was important at this time.

== Growth on the Modernism wave ==
In 1940, the municipality had about 385,000 inhabitants and its growth rates were positive for industry, civil construction, education, health, electrification, sanitation, port movement, transportation, and urbanization works. The road and air links with the center of Brazil were increased, and the railroad network to the interior of the state was expanded. According to Olavo Ramalho Marques, José Loureiro da Silva, Bins' successor, is remembered as one of those largely responsible for modernizing the city, moving it away from an obsolete colonial heritage and leading it to a metropolis status - or at least preparing it for that. Beginning his government under the Estado Novo, he was appointed to the mayoralty by Getúlio Vargas and governed with the City Council closed, in a transition that was far from peaceful. However, he was a popular governor, and even though he was a trusted man of Getúlio, through which he could exercise authoritarian power, he decided to create the Council of the General Plan, which proposed a new model of urban organization with the definition of a radial and decentralized plan, in order to solve the perennial traffic jams that were already occurring in the center due to the previous reforms of the General Improvement Plan that suffered from the lack of a more coherent and functional assignment of land use for the various human activities.

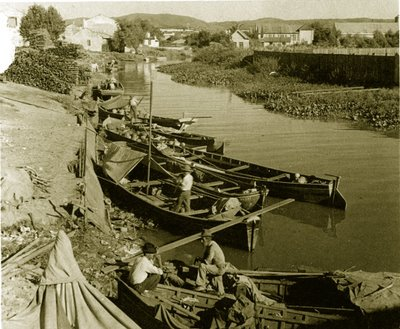
Arroio Dilúvio before the canalization.

During his administration, important urbanistic and infrastructural milestones were accomplished, such as the construction of the Azenha Bridge and the canalization of the Dilúvio stream, which caused many floods, the opening of large avenues such as Farrapos, Salgado Filho, and André da Rocha, as well as the extension of Borges de Medeiros and João Pessoa avenues. This required the demolition of many other old mansions in the center of the city, increasing the price of rent and reducing the supply of housing for the lower classes, driving them to more distant neighborhoods.

Another interesting aspect of his administration was the intensification of the debates around the definition of an official version of the city's history, establishing the concession of the land to the sesmeiro Jerônimo de Ornellas as its initial mark, and not the effective beginning of the settlement. To achieve this result, he was helped by the Historic and Geographic Institute of Rio Grande do Sul, coordinated by historian Walter Spalding, culminating in the publication of Spalding's first historical study of Porto Alegre, the book Porto Alegre: biografia duma cidade (1941), with more than 700 pages and plenty of attached documentation, a work that in fact was more than a cultural achievement, it was also a political act, intending to legitimize his administration and exalt the city's advances and bright future.

The impact of World War II was felt in the city. The difficulties imposed on international trade created shortages of various goods, but, on the other hand, stimulated the emergence of new industries, mainly metallurgical, chemical and weaving, leading to the formation of new neighborhoods, especially in the north, in the floodplain area of the Gravataí River, filled with a population largely from the interior of the state attracted by the accelerated demand for labor. The end of the war freed up the importation of vehicles and the use of gasoline, and there was an expansion of the private and public fleet, making public transportation services more dynamic. In view of insufficient resources to meet the growing social needs, the city government resorted to extending the legal area of the urban zone, making it possible to increase taxation and open up vast areas to subdivision, which proved to be counterproductive, because by turning rural land very distant from the densified and urbanized center into urban land, it required the extension of public services, which generated high costs. As a result, the transportation, sanitation and piped water systems faced an adaptive crisis. The city's profile was changing rapidly under the pressure of growth, and the explosive population increase of the 1940s, when it reached 350,000 inhabitants, demanded fast action in planning the expanding residential areas, requiring the design of large-scale solutions. By the end of the decade, the population swelling was already showing its negative side, with the presence of several slums in the peripheries and the growth of violence and marginalization. One of the most striking events of these twenty years was the great flood of 1941, which left 80,000 people devastated, inaugurating a new attitude towards the Guaíba. Since then, the city would progressively isolate itself from its lake. The beginning of the mobilization of black people, with the founding in 1943 of the União dos Homens de Cor, which five years later would branch out to ten other states in the country, is also worth mentioning.

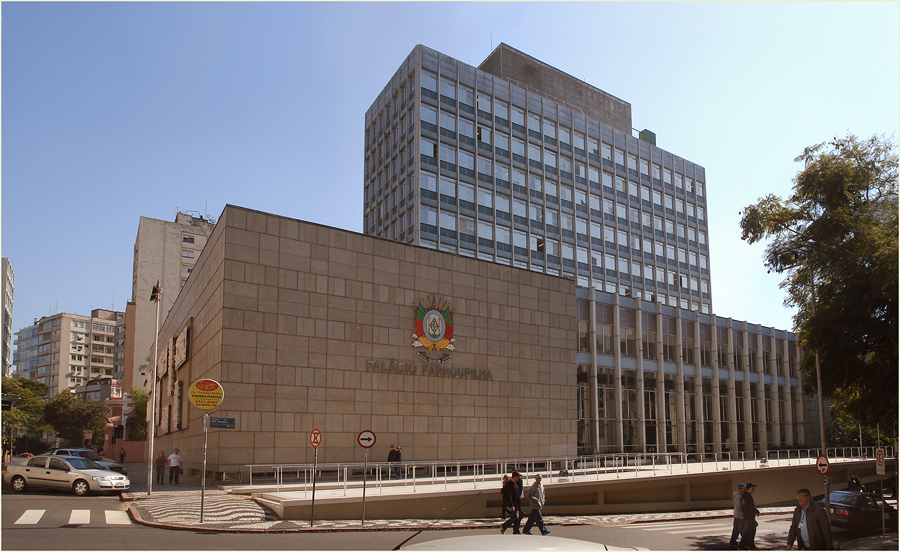
Farroupilha Palace.

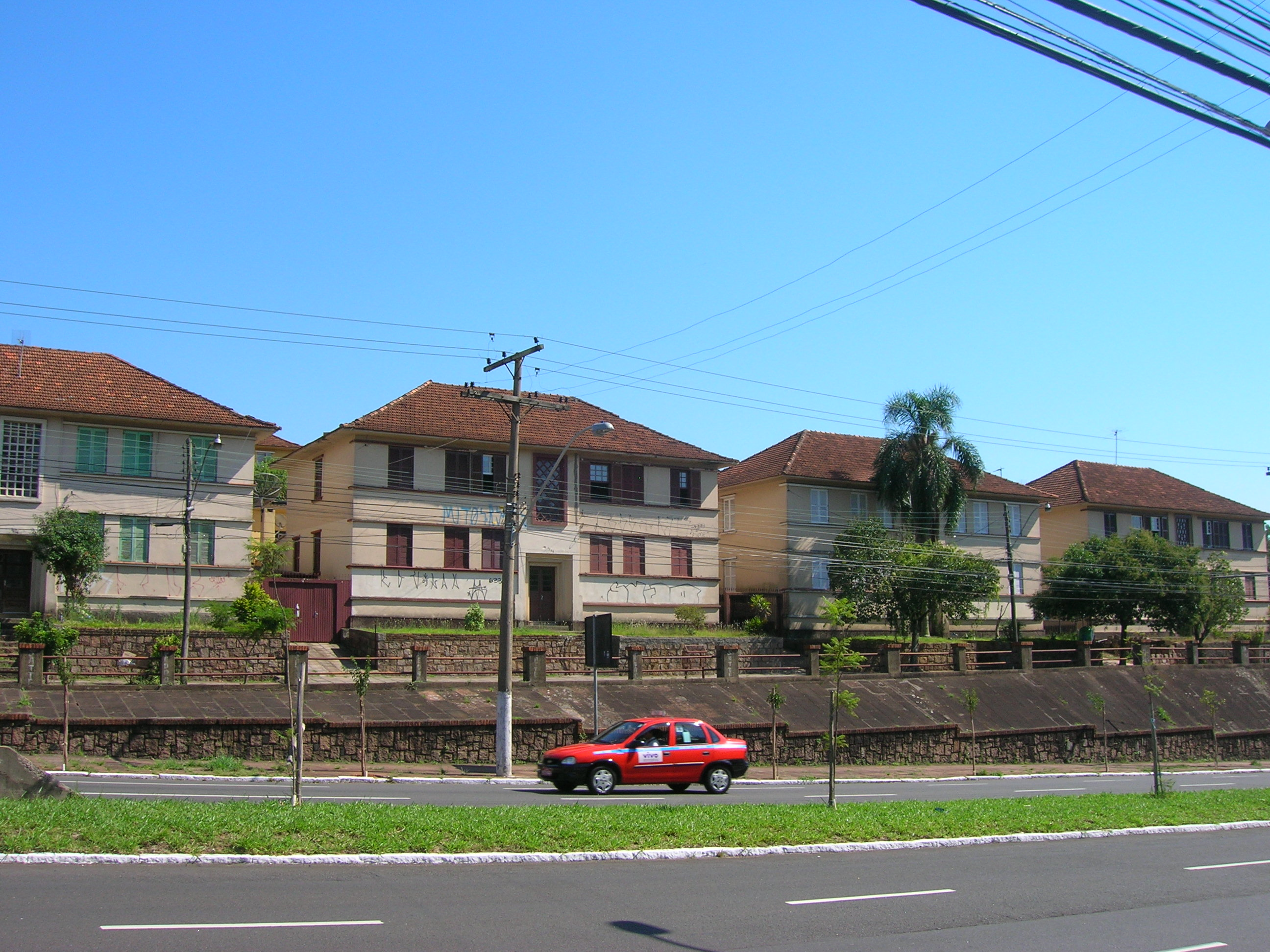
Some buildings of the Vila do IAPI, seen from Plínio Brasil Milano Avenue.

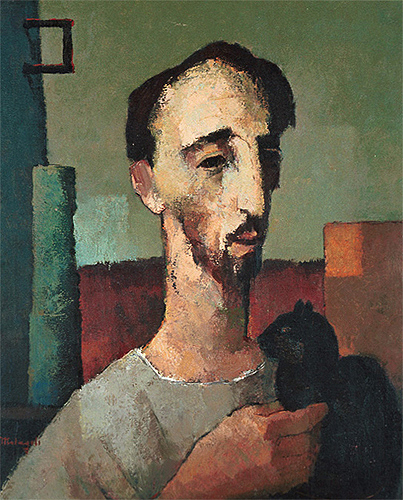
The black cat, by Ado Malagoli, 1954, MARGS collection. Malagoli was superintendent of Artistic Education of the Secretariat of Education and Culture of the State and revolutionized the teaching of art. He was also founder and first director of MARGS and one of the main agents for the definitive institutional consecration of Modernism in the visual arts, besides leaving an important production in painting.

In the early 1950s, the influence of architectural Modernism became dominant. In this period, large public buildings of more updated lines were erected, such as the Farroupilha Palace, the headquarters of the Legislative Assembly, the Palace of Justice, the Cristal Racecourse, the Fêmina Hospital, the old headquarters of the Salgado Filho Airport, the Pharmacy School of the UFRGS, and several residential buildings such as the Jaguaribe and Esplanada buildings.

Ildo Meneghetti, a very popular mayor, left important works, prioritizing popular housing, exemplified in the Vila do IAPI, which today is a cultural heritage of the municipality, and improving the supply and public transportation, where there was, in 1953, the taking over of the tramway service administered by the Companhia Carris Porto-Alegrense, a municipal public company. He was a follower of Getúlio Vargas, continuing the long tradition started in the state by Júlio de Castilhos and that had served as inspiration for Vargas himself. When Vargas committed suicide in Rio in 1954, there were violent demonstrations in Porto Alegre, which ended with the Diários Associados being set on fire by the crowd. Then, Leonel Brizola took office, confirming the PTB Labour Movement in power and starting his own political "school".

By the end of the 1950s, the urban center was already full of buildings of considerable height and the city could already be perfectly considered one of Brazil's great capitals, with a varied network of services and an active economy. With approximately 400 thousand inhabitants, Porto Alegre had its first Book Fair, a museum specially dedicated to the arts, the Rio Grande do Sul Museum of Art, a federal university, hosted the concerts of its new symphony orchestra, OSPA, and names such as Mario Quintana, Aldo Obino, Lupicínio Rodrigues, Dante de Laytano, Aldo Locatelli, Manuelito de Ornelas, Paixão Côrtes, Walter Spalding, Bruno Kiefer, Túlio Piva, Barbosa Lessa, Armando Albuquerque, Ado Malagoli, Angelo Guido and the members of the Clube de Gravura of Porto Alegre, among many others, had already become a reference in the fields of literature, poetry, historiography, traditionalism and folklore, fine arts, music and art criticism.

By this time, Rua da Praia had become one of the city's most glamorous spots, where the elite paraded among movie theaters, cafes, and fine stores. This period seemed to definitively consecrate the role that Rua da Praia had already been playing in the urban culture since a long time before, as the backbone and main artery for the circulation of goods and ideas in the city, as an agglutinating and irradiating center of trends and culture, and as an emblem of identity for the people from Porto Alegre. It had even become a recurring theme or scenario in the city's cultural production.

However, as Monteiro said, the idyllic vision people have of the 1950s in Porto Alegre, the so-called "golden years", with its cultural effervescence, the famous balls at the UFRGS Rectory, the scooters of the "transvestite youth", the economic growth economic growth, social stability and new habits of consumption and entertainment, usually does not take into account the deepening of social differences between classes and the segregation that occurred in this period, a fact revealed by the rapid expansion of slums and the "sanitization" of the noble neighborhoods for the exclusive use of the elites.

At the end of the 1950s, the first General Plan of Porto Alegre was finally implemented, composed by Edvaldo Paiva and Demétrio Ribeiro, based on the Charter of Athens and supported by specific legislation. For Helton Bello, the verticalization of the city was accentuated with this Plan, making Porto Alegre

.... experienced the largest building growth in its history, which significantly altered the urban morphology.... The basic principles of Modernism became a legal instrument through parameters for the structuring of the city. These standards consisted in the rationalization of activities, roads and the institution of urbanistic indexes (density, building lot potential, setbacks and building height), which were applied according to the growth of urbanized areas.

=== Recreation of the Gaucho ===
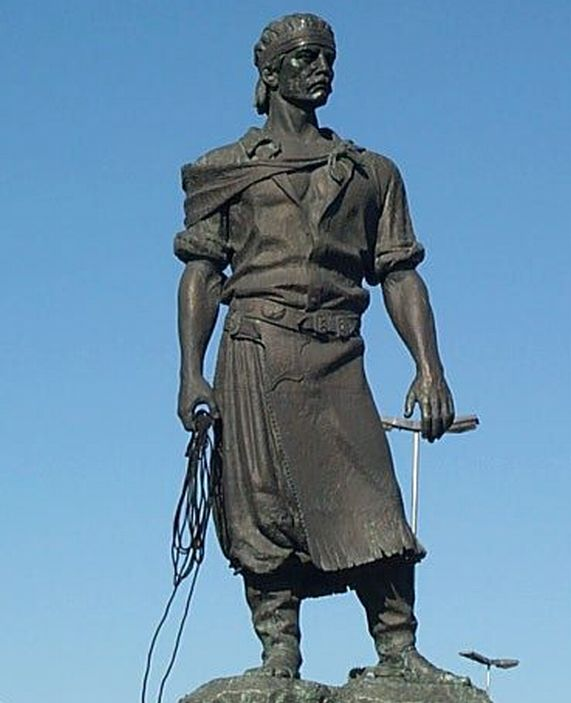
Antônio Caringi: O Laçador, an idealized statue of the gaucho for which Paixão Cortes served as model in 1954. Inaugurated in 1958, today it is the symbol of the city, elected by popular vote.

This period was marked by the consolidation of a cultural movement that had repercussions much later: the redemption in the urban environment of the rural roots and traditions that had by then become a laughingstock for the city's inhabitants, due to the emphatic official promotion of the ideals of progress and modernity in the previous decades, which had internationalized and massively urbanized the local culture. The gaucho traditionalism was born in Porto Alegre, today institutionalized in the Gaucho Traditionalist Movement. Barbosa Lessa and Paixão Cortes appeared as leading figures in this process, starting a series of anthropological researches when this science was barely recognized in the state. Their search, however, was in its origin more linked to a desire for historical reconstruction than to interpretation. On April 24, 1948, those folklorists, together with a group of young students, had founded the first Center of Gaucho Tradition in the city, CTG 35. There, they drank mate and imitated the cowboy habits, such as the charla (conversation) that the cowboys entertained in the sheds of the estancias. Barbosa Lessa recalls that

.... had no great pretension to revolutionize the world, although we did not agree with that type of civilization that was imposed on us in every way (...) we did not intend to write about the gaucho or the barn: from the first moment, we embodied in ourselves the figure of the gaucho, dressing and speaking in the gaucho fashion, and we felt owners of the world when we gathered on Saturday afternoons around the open fire.

Since then, the traditionalist movement slowly gained visibility, with the capital as its irradiating center, and became a true lifestyle for many people in the urban centers. In the 1960s, articles and lectures on the subject appeared, and also the figure of Teixeirinha, a phenomenon of popularity. From the 1970s on, several gaucho music festivals began to be organized throughout the state, which gave space to politically engaged expressions that led to an integration between regionalisms from various countries of the Southern Cone, whose histories had many points of contact. From the 1980s on, the pace of this process accelerated enormously, to the point of gaining support from the official culture, attracting sympathizers from other ethnic and cultural origins, such as Germans and Italians, and inspiring the creation of hundreds of CTGs across state borders, even abroad.

== Social Crisis and the "Years of Lead ==
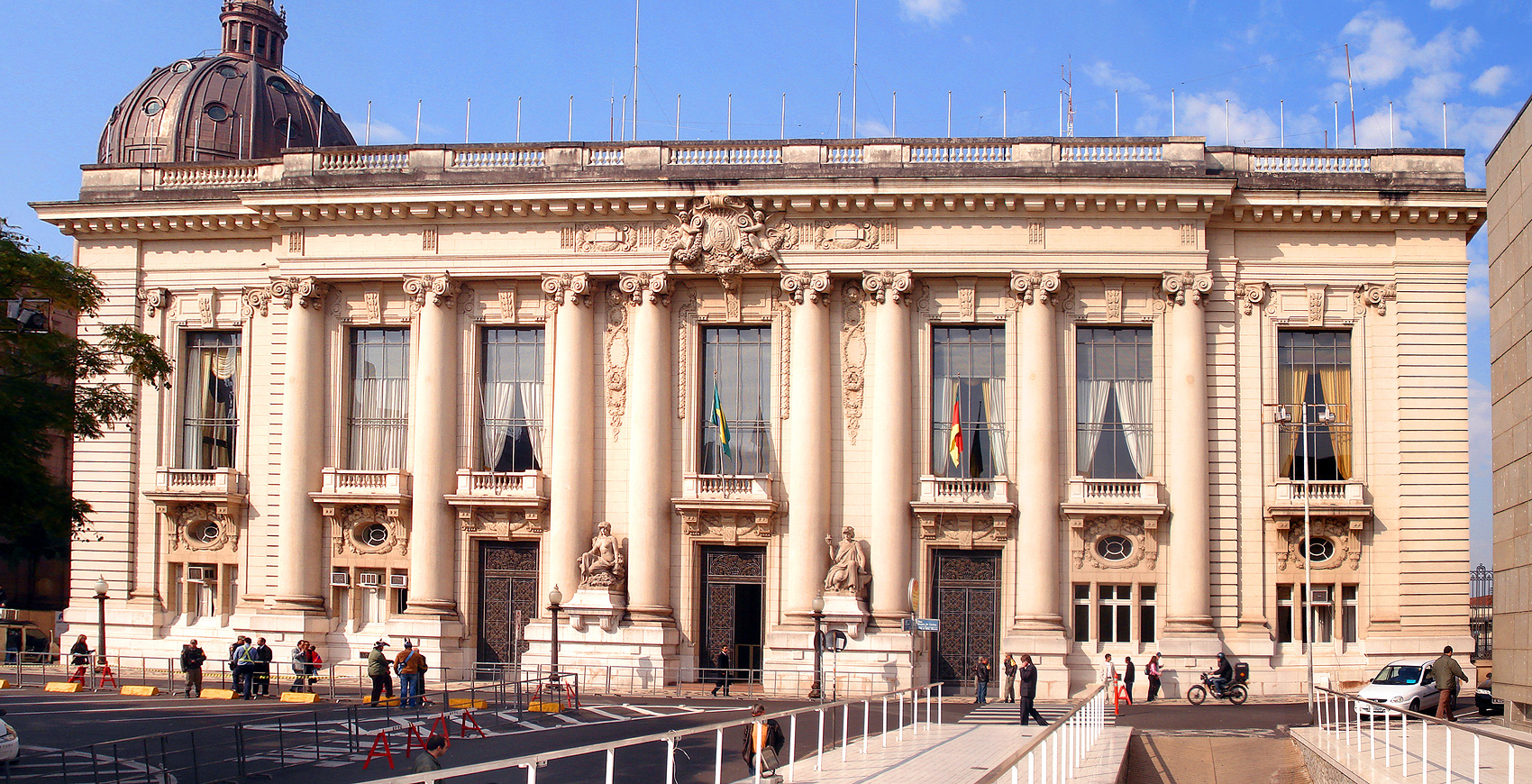
Piratini Palace.

Meanwhile, at the turn of the 1960s, the capital's bohemian life gathered an expressive and influential group of intellectuals and artistic producers aligned to Existentialism and Communism, which lent it a strong political coloring. Avant-garde theater plays were regularly staged, with polemical and challenging approaches; the plastic arts showed a social realist/expressionist art, which at times even acquired a pamphlet-like tone - with great artists such as Francisco Stockinger, Vasco Prado, and Iberê Camargo standing out - and the Vitória Bookstore became the biggest arena for philosophical and political discussion.

At the same time, Loureiro da Silva was once again winning the City Hall with the intention of cleaning up its finances. He also invested heavily in construction work, concluding the paving of 150 streets, building 18 public squares, and obtaining, together with Jânio Quadros' government, resources for the sanitation of the Arroio Dilúvio basin and for the paving of Ipiranga Avenue. In the area of education, he inaugurated 85 new school buildings and left 27 others in progress. However, during Jânio's administration, the national political mood became extreme due to the strong polarization between Right-wing and Left-wing, which was dramatically reflected in the city as well. At the time of Jânio's resignation on August 25, 1961, which generated an institutional crisis in Brazil, Brizola, now governor, began to articulate the Legality movement, in agreement with several political, union, and student leaders, organizing a large march, but on the 27th Rádio Gaúcha was silenced by a military intervention. Brizola immediately requisitioned Rádio Guaíba and started a radio network for Legality. The next day, the federal government ordered the bombing of Piratini and a naval force was sent to intervene in the state. New popular demonstrations supported the movement, which had the backing of the Catholic Church and the 3rd Army Division command itself. At this point the palace was surrounded by barricades. However, the soldiers in charge of preparing the bombing aircraft at the Canoas base refused to comply with the order, and the palace was saved.

Events were moving fast. João Goulart, Jânio's successor, took populist measures that displeased the dominant sectors; the fear of Communism triumphed and Porto Alegre was the stage for important political movements that led to the military coup of 1964, commanded by then governor Ildo Meneghetti from the Piratini Palace. The people protested again, going on several rallies and marches, both for and against the coup, sometimes facing repression by the Military Brigade, with hundreds of arrests. Once the military ensured their dominance, with the support of the United States, which was ready to intervene if there was resistance, they imposed a program of systematic censorship to all opposing expressions. Politicians were revoked, unions were closed, newspapers were banned, and several professors at the UFRGS were fired and persecuted. At the same time, the persecution extended to the religious sphere, with the repression of African cults.

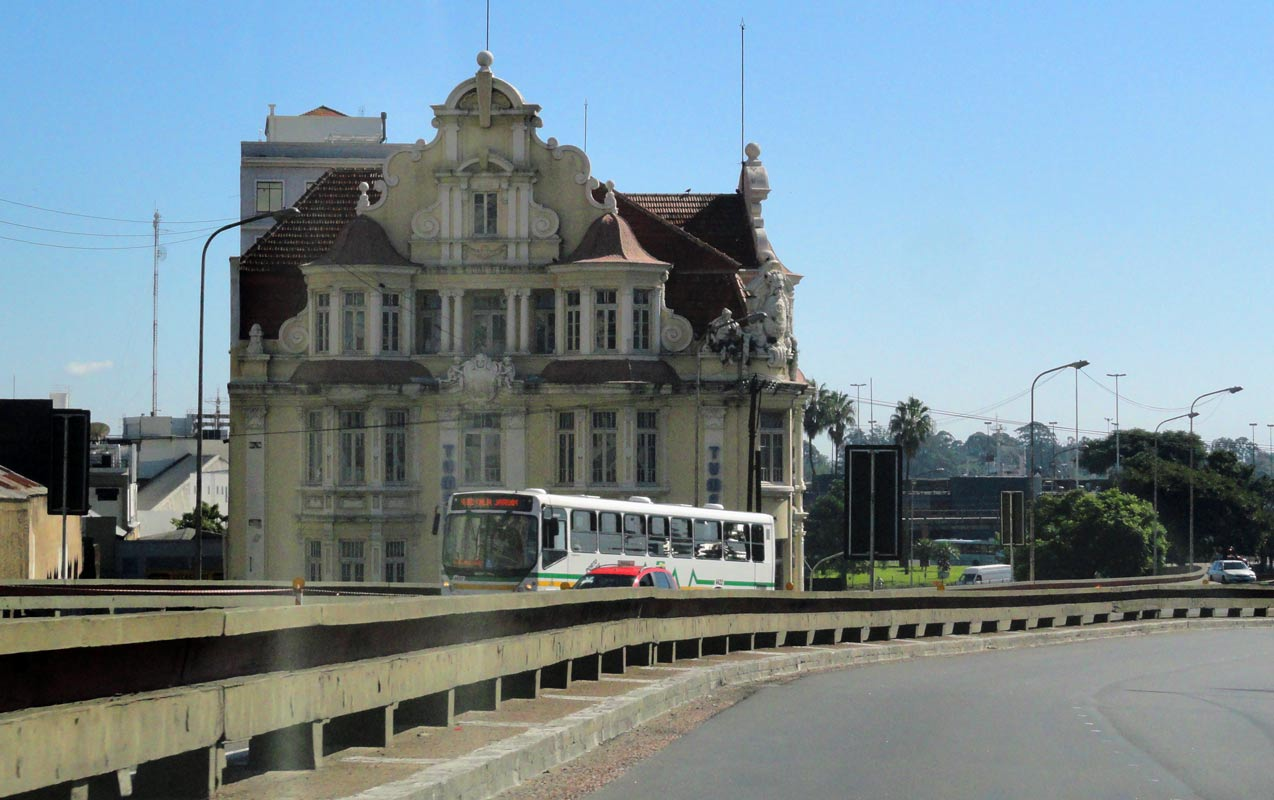
The Elevated of Conceição, realizing the suffocation of the Ely building. At one point, the Elevated passes less than three meters from the second floor of the building.

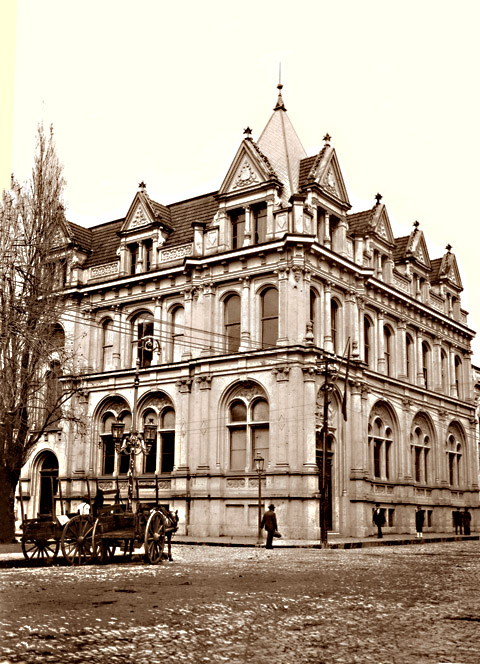
The imposing old headquarters of the Caixa Econômica Federal in Porto Alegre, demolished in the 1970s.

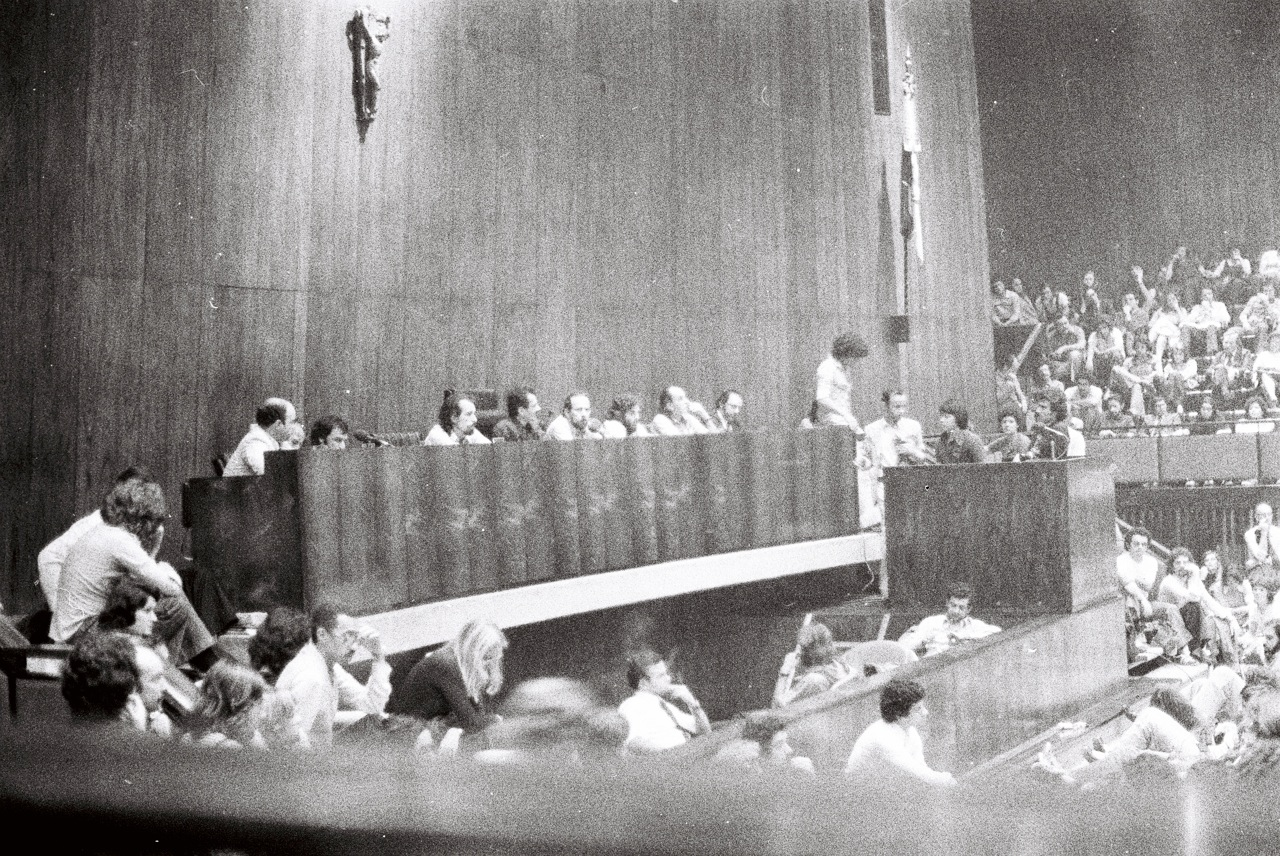
Event of the week of cultural debates and repudiation of the military dictatorship in the Legislative Assembly of Rio Grande do Sul. Photo by Luis Geraldo Melo, 1975.

Thompson Flores, who took office in 1969, led a government characterized by large projects, especially in the area of transportation, favored by the economic boom of the Brazilian Miracle, when the country's GDP was growing at a dizzying average of 11.2% a year. He deactivated the tramway and encouraged automobile transportation. He built six large viaducts, but the technical approach of the projects disregarded the popular will in prioritizing investments and elementary aspects of urban landscaping. This practice can be seen in the destruction of the surroundings and the perspective of the Ely Building, an important historical complex, with the construction of the Elevated of Conceição, a brutal urban intervention in the middle of the historical center. Countless old buildings, some of great historical and architectural significance, have disappeared in this progressive rush. During his administration, he also inaugurated the Moinhos de Vento Park and the new Bus Station, created the popular district of Restinga, built a large road complex connecting the East and South zones through the historic center, and built the Mauá Wall, between the Mauá Avenue and the port's wharf, a work intended to prevent flooding, but whose usefulness is still being contested, besides being accused of preventing the population's access to the Guaíba riverfront. In spite of this, he was honored shortly before his death with the Medal of Urbanistic Merit.

He had to face, on the other hand, the first public protest of an ecological nature in Porto Alegre, which had national repercussions; the first mobilizations of society in defense of the historical heritage, of the continuity of urban memory, and of the preservation of traditional spaces for community socialization centered in historical areas and buildings, such as on the occasion of the threatened demolition of the Public Market, and many complaints from the population because of the road works being simultaneously developed everywhere, which disrupted traffic and caused various losses to private economies, such as disputes over the amount paid for the numerous expropriations necessary to carry out the developments and the inconvenience caused by the compulsory transfer of many residents to other areas.

This period was marked by growing dissatisfaction with the political situation in Brazil. The military dictatorship was intensifying, fighting strikes and local protests against the regime with smoke bombs and shock troops. In the Legislative Assembly, many parliamentarians repeatedly spoke out against the political persecution, mistreatment and even torture that the numerous political prisoners received, and the repression of street demonstrations organized by students and unions. In fact, in the face of censorship of most news about such events, the public word of a deputy was often the only source of information for the general population about what was going on in the political scene, and the only force that could mobilize the authorities toward an explanation or the solution of some impasse. The social environment, in any case, was dominated by tension and fear. On the other hand, politicians favorable to the military regime organized supportive events and celebrations, especially on each March 31, the anniversary of the coup, praising what they saw as their achievements, such as the maintenance of order and public tranquility.

In this strictly controlled environment, independent intellectual life survived mainly in ghettos. Perhaps the most important of these was the notorious Esquina Maldita, in the Bom Fim neighborhood, where Oswaldo Aranha Avenue and Sarmento Leite Street meet, next to the central campus of the UFRGS. According to Nicole dos Reis, it was ....

.... a point of discussion of local and national political issues by the intellectuals and artists of the time. It was an emergence of a space of contestation in a neighborhood, Bom Fim, which is cited.... as the main point of sociability of the components of this social network.

Juremir Machado da Silva complements, reinforcing its importance, by saying that it was a space in which....

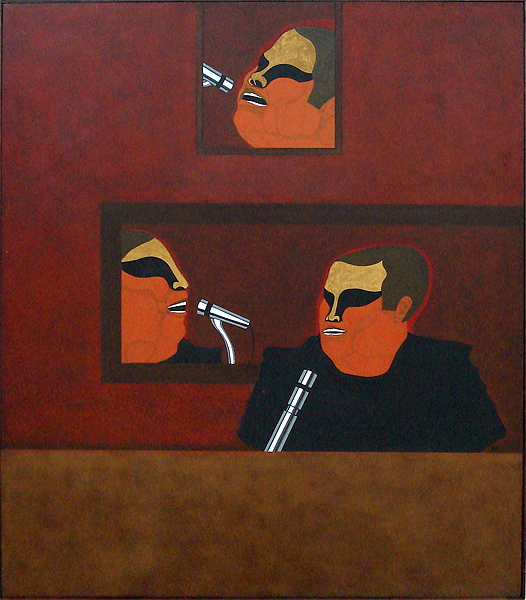
Britto Velho: Painting #2, 1977, MARGS collection. An example of art renewed by the influence of pop, abstraction, and conceptualism, a synthesis that dominated the art scene in the 1970s and often expressed political opinions.

.... intensified the struggles for women's emancipation, strengthened respect for homosexuals, fought sexism, radically lived the dreams of open relationships and sexual freedom. In other words, it set out to defend differences. Through the Esquina Maldita, Porto Alegre plunged into daily plurality, walked towards the right to singularity, and went deeper into the examination and refusal of moral conservatism.

These decades also saw a resumption in the discussion about the history of the city and the state - a tendency to review local histories that was visible in other parts of Brazil - when universities, namely PUC-RS and UFRGS, took the lead in this process by creating the discipline of History of Rio Grande do Sul at the undergraduate and graduate levels in History, articulating with other historiographical institutions based in Porto Alegre, such as the Historic and Geographic Institute of Rio Grande do Sul. The result of these initiatives was the proliferation of books, chronicles and essays on local history, biographies of historical figures, and bibliographical studies on Rio Grande do Sul authors. While administrators, politicians, intellectuals and artists, historians, and journalists were each building their own versions of the events of the 1960s and 1970s, the social panorama of the city in this phase could not be complete without the existence of some precious reports from members of the lowest income population, the outcasts of history, for whom "civilization" was a distant thing. One of these lonely voices was Zeli Barbosa, born in 1941, black, with primary education, mother of five children, and resident of the poorest part of Ilhota in the 1960s. In the 1970s, already living in Restinga in somewhat better conditions, she decided to narrate in writing, in a Portuguese dialect, her difficult life experience in Ilhota, marked by racial prejudice, poverty, disease, violence, under-housing and under-employment, lack of medical care and urban infrastructure, a situation that for many is still today the sad daily reality. She said:

Only now, after many years, I felt like writing, because they say that to remember is to live, and only now do I really live. At that time, with each passing moment, I was slowly dying.... for me it should be a place remembered with affection and longing, because it was the place where one of the best night serenade composers, our Lupicínio Rodrigues, was born.... and thinking of that I say, I should think of Ilhota with affection, however thinking of the horror and with sadness because I spent the worst moments of my life there.... (The house) was tiny and you couldn't even move around. Sitting in the backyard was the last thing you could think of, because the fetid smell of the cesspools in each house, or rather, in each backyard, there were three or four cesspools and more garbage and pools with all sorts of debris that formed the worst possible odors. Many times it was not even possible to sleep or have lunch, such was the stench. And something else was worse, when the water rose with the rain, in each backyard there were at least four or three patents with septic tanks, since there was no plumbing, and they overflowed and everything came out of them and mixed with the water, which most of the time entered inside the houses. Then I would have the illusion of bringing everything back tidy. When we least expected it, a rain came and that was it, all my illusion of staying in that place was gone. .... I thought that he (the husband) didn't want to leave because of the women there, because there were plenty of women, cachaça and samba, my husband and I fought like animals. There were some prostitutes living in Ilhota that helped me a lot when my children were small. When I would leave for work, Maria would tell me that I could leave the children with her, and I really had no one to leave them with, so I would leave them with her. Death and prisons, it was the most natural of events, as soon as I went there.... we saw so many shocking and horrible things that transmitted to our spirits that evil....

Guilherme Socias Villela succeeded Thompson Flores in 1975 and remained in power until 1983; during his administration, the police of repression perpetrated in the city. In 1978, the kidnapping of two Uruguayan political activists, Lilian Celiberti and Universindo Diaz, an act caught by two journalists, Luiz Cláudio Cunha and João Batista Scalco, from Veja magazine, ended up having a bombastic effect on national public opinion, unleashing a lively polemic for a whole year, which served, as Heinz said, as....

.... a test of what limits society should impose on the authoritarian excesses of the repressive organs and their cover-up.... The CPI, installed on March 24, 1979 (to study the case), became the epicenter of one of the final political battles between those who sustained the political-authoritarian patrimony left over from the most difficult times of the dictatorship and an opposition that was no longer embarrassed by the multiplication of improbable versions and the covering up of authoritarian expedients.

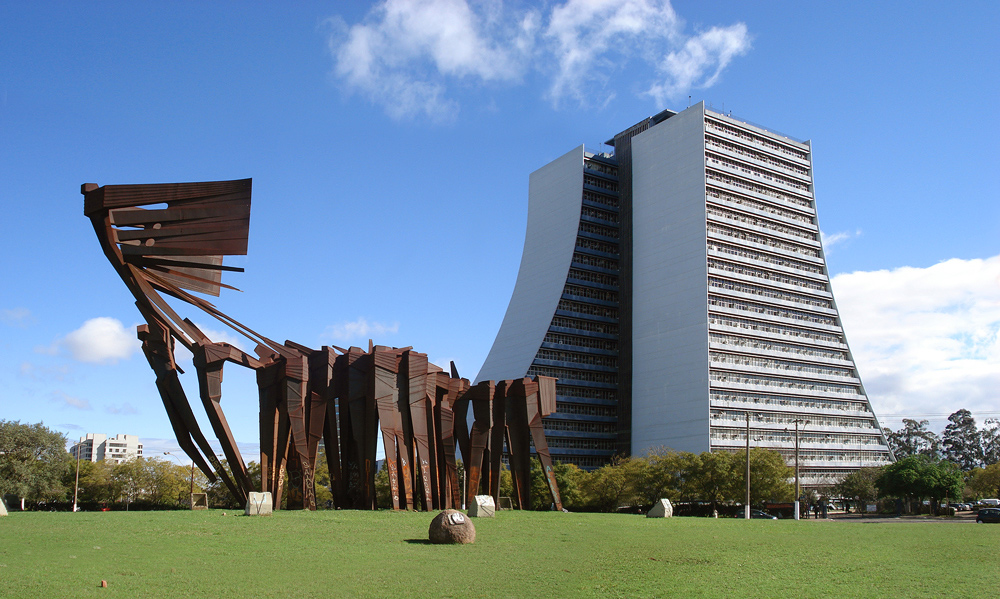
The Administrative Center of the State of Rio Grande do Sul, begun in 1976, with a sculpture group by Carlos Tenius in the foreground, from 1974, representing the Azorean colonization; both form a monumental set that today is one of the city's postcards.

Among many debates and protests, but striving to maintain an open dialogue with the City Council, Villela governed until the loosening of the dictatorship and the beginning of redemocratization. On the other hand, besides implementing several important infrastructure works, he introduced a new note in the municipal administration, valuing the environment and social interaction. During his two administrations, Marinha do Brasil Park, Maurício Sirotski Sobrinho Park, Vinte de Maio Park and Mascarenhas de Moraes Park were inaugurated, as well as 35 new squares and expansions in Moinhos de Vento Park and Farroupilha Park, totaling the planting of 1.15 million trees in eight years of government. He created the Brique da Redenção, the Municipal Center of Culture, and the first Municipal Secretariat of Environment, a pioneer in Brazil. He was the author of the Environmental Impact Law, which provides for the prevention and control of pollution in the municipality. During his mandate, a new General Plan was approved in 1979, in which the modernist principles were still generally valid, as an extension of the Athens Charter, although some innovations were introduced, such as an inspiration in the superblocks model used in Brasília and a greater community participation in the decisions through Municipal Councils. The city's physiognomy, however, became impoverished, as the general quality of the new buildings declined and, with rare exceptions, such as the State Administrative Center building, could not take the iconic place of so many valuable historical buildings that had been destroyed. At the opening of the 1980s the city had more than 1.1 million inhabitants; it was definitely a metropolis.

== Recent History ==
The 1979 Plan was not entirely successful in its application. By establishing new construction indexes, the changes gave rise to a series of frictions among residents of the residential zones and between them and the public authorities and real estate agents, due to the authorization of spikes in areas with predominantly one-story buildings, breaking up the residential fabric of some traditional neighborhoods with buildings of up to 20 stories. The polemic led to a new reformulation of the legislation in the 1980s, when it was definitely understood that, in order to favor a harmonious general growth, it would be necessary to deepen the urbanistic issue by attracting other areas of knowledge to the discussion, making it possible to formulate more dynamic, realistic, and adaptable solutions to the increasingly fluid profile of the city, and taking into account aspects of collective memory, cultural identity, and human coexistence. The success of proposals in this area, which have succeeded each other as the years have passed, including new revisions of the General Plan, has however proved to be very controversial, with advances and retreats.

Still in the 1980s, the city went through a decentralization process, due to several conjugated factors: the depopulation of its old industrial district, formed in the center region, along a tendency of decline of the industrial activity in the city in favor of the growth of the services sector; the construction of several large shopping centers in the neighborhoods, and the relocation of several state and municipal administrative bodies out of the center. At the same time, the downtown area began to become depopulated with residents and upscale retail, beginning a period of decline and degradation. The following decade had one of its main landmarks in the creation of the Participatory budgeting administrative system, started during Olívio Dutra's administration, calling on society to participate democratically and actively in choosing priorities for public investments. This system of government remained in place in the following administrations and is still in force, being constantly re-evaluated to adapt to new demands and coming to be seen internationally as a model of public administration. Important investments were also made in education, sewage and garbage collection systems, street paving, and low-income housing. Among the main public works in the last years are the duplication or expansion of several important avenues, the installation of several bus lanes, the extension of the water service to all the city's households, the creation of the Third Perimetral, and the construction of the Carlos Gomes Avenue viaduct.

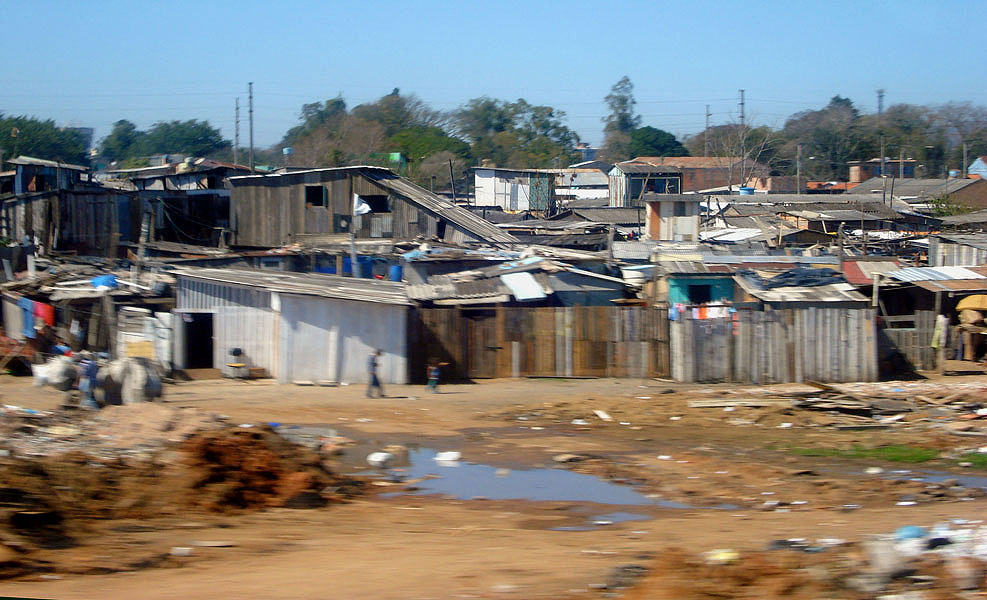
Slum at the northern entrance of the city.

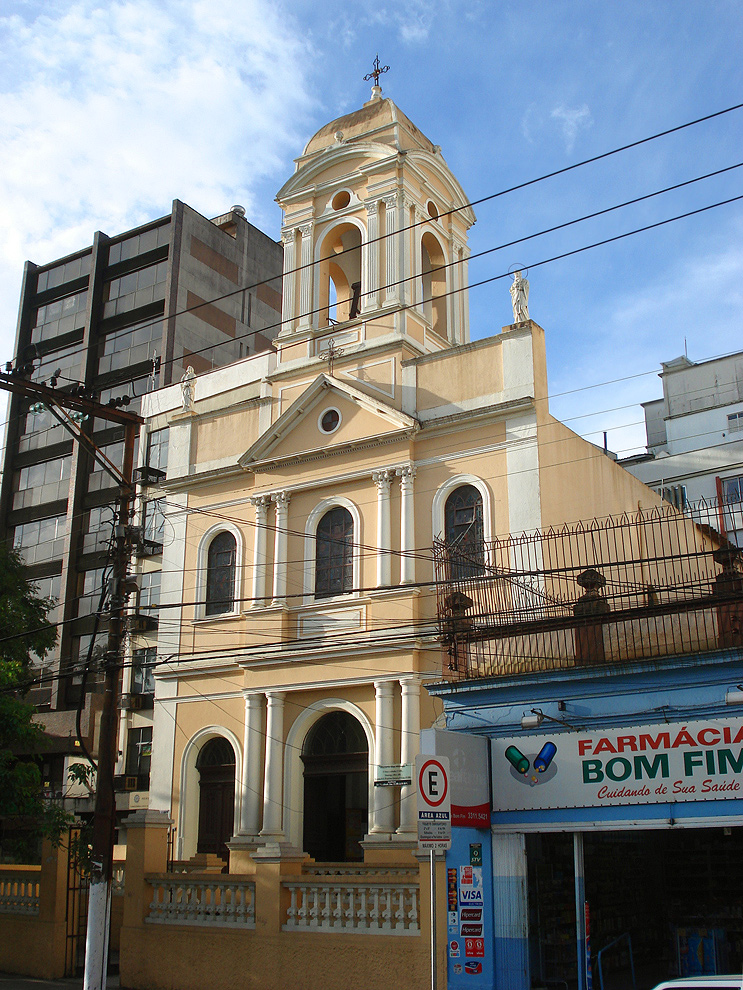
Chapel of Bonfim.

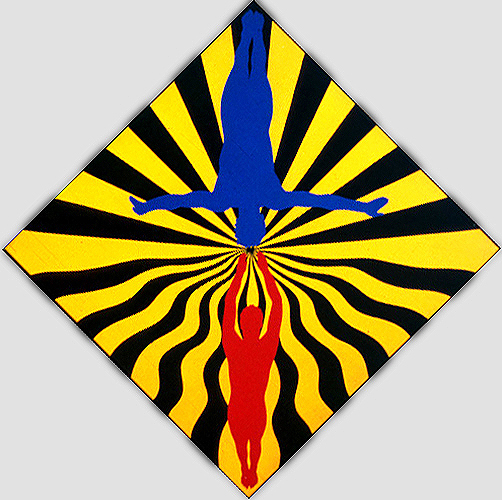
Milton Kurtz: Quasi contact, 1989, MARGS collection. An example of painting from Porto Alegre in the 1980s, in which it reappeared with plastic exuberance in the art scene after the exhaustion of Conceptualism. The Pop influence, however, remains

On the other hand, the city started to suffer strong pressure in many sectors, such as public security, quality of life, pollution and environmental degradation, occupation of the Guaíba riverfront, balance of public accounts, traffic, basic education, housing, and unemployment. For Margaret Bakos, these problems are to a large extent late reflections of the Castilhista administrative model practiced until the 1940s, a period when solutions were always more improvised than properly planned, and when the undertakings were always above the financing capacity of the municipality, generating a snowball effect in which public indebtedness increased at an accelerated pace and problems were always left without a complete solution, worsening with the rapid and very uncontrolled growth of the city. Jacks, Goellner & Capparelli complement by saying that despite the investments, "the city of the end of the century reflects in its neighborhoods, its streets and its corners, the differences historically imposed by hegemonic actions, where the central areas of the city were privileged in relation to the periphery". Reflecting on the city's recent evolution, Charles Monteiro says that "Porto Alegre continues to face the challenges that the past and the present have bequeathed it, but there seems to be, more than in any previous period, a greater awareness and participation of civil society in the discussion and search for viable alternatives to confront all these urban problems".

While the administrative authorities from the 1980s on tried to reorganize the urban network on more objective bases, with the creation in 1981 of the Historical and Cultural Heritage Team, shortly afterwards linked to the Coordination of Cultural Memory of the Municipal Secretary of Culture, a process of study and rescue of the cultural assets owned by the Municipality of special historical, social and architectural interest began, systematizing the listing of assets, which had started a few years before, in 1979. The existence of the Historic Center was also recognized, and conservation and sustainable development measures were proposed, as well as other stabilized areas such as the garden city neighborhoods and areas of special cultural interest. The old buildings began to be valued more by the population, along with the green areas; as a result, many centuries-old buildings that were on the demolition list were saved and new parks were created. The case of the Chapel of Bonfim was exemplary in this regard. After many years of abandonment and degradation, it caught fire in what was suspected to be an arson attack. Important elements were lost in it, such as the carved main altar; under the pretext of being too ruined, it was almost demolished, but society reacted, and all the subsequent polemic contributed to mark in everyone's conscience, citizens and public power, the value of memory, art, history and its material testimonies. The Chapel was eventually listed as a monument and restored in 1983.

The popular appropriation of its cultural heritage in the 1980s was one of the expressions of an entirely renewed social movement. The popularization of new mass media, new technologies, new forms of entertainment, and new consumer habits transformed family relationships and urban culture, and civil society began to regain its space of political representation and the reins of its own life. The Diretas Já, a movement that exploded throughout Brazil between 1983 and 1984 with large demonstrations and extensive media coverage, on July 21, 1983, the National Day of Protest, stopped several major cities in the country, including Porto Alegre, where despite the large repressive apparatus and the arrest of eight demonstrators, about 12 thousand people gathered in front of the City Hall and the Piratini Palace; on April 13, 1984 the movement was much larger, with 200 thousand people taking to the streets of Porto Alegre to demand direct elections. The artistic production, which had been kept under pressure from censorship, rearticulated itself in a highly politicized form, claiming the normalization of Brazilian institutional and cultural life. Sandra Pesavento states that in this period "in Porto Alegre the local movement Deu pra Ti Anos 70 began, which celebrated the end of the decade. The generation that had grown up with AI-5 and the disinherited of the 60s and 70s claimed another country and another city in their dreams".

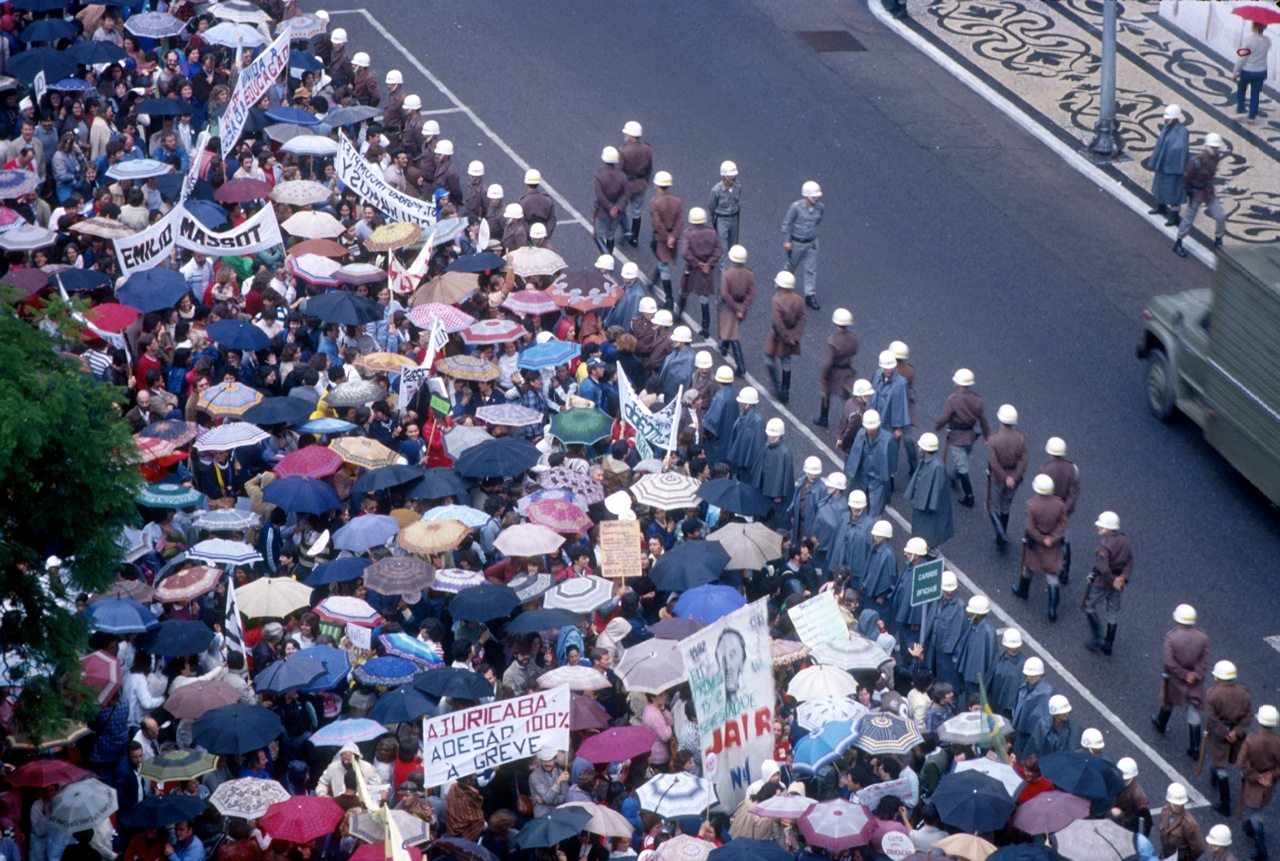
Teachers' demonstration in front of the Piratini Palace, 1985. Photo by Luis Geraldo Melo.

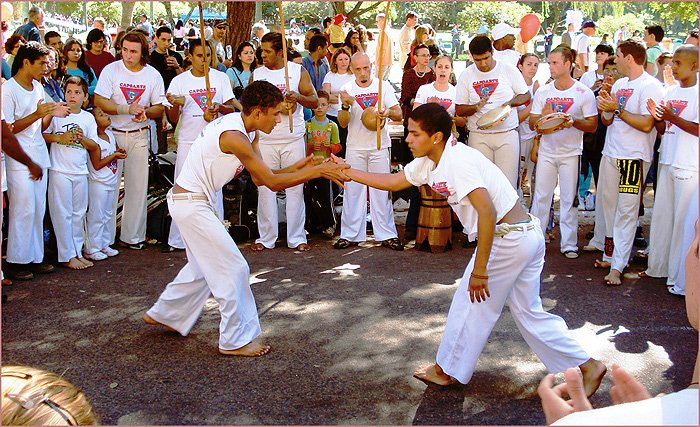
Capoeira at Brique da Redenção.

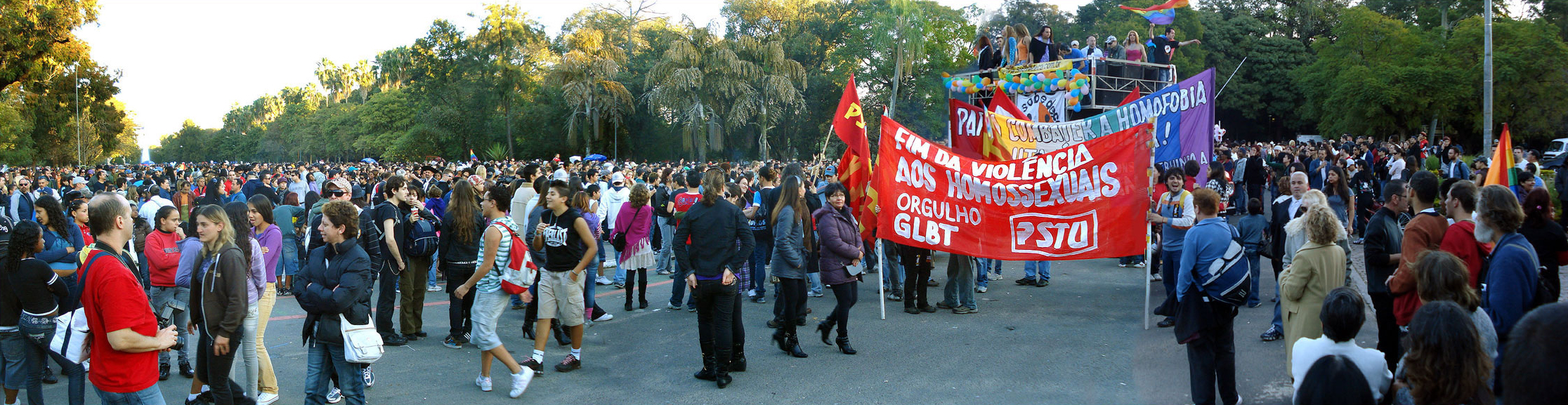
2009 LGBT Free Parade at Redenção Park.

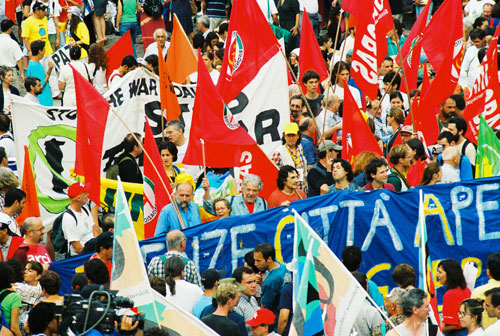
Opening march of the 2003 World Social Forum.

In this new panorama of urban life in Porto Alegre, one of the most important spaces was the already mentioned Bom Fim neighborhood and its pubs, such as Lola and Ocidente, forming almost an independent republic stuck in the heart of the city. The main leaders of the contestatory activity of the time, people with different ideologies, who lived utopias transformed into lifestyles - such as punks, rockers, freaks, darks, along with artists, philosophers, and literati - from which would result the definition of identity of an entire generation, gathered in this place. It was the effervescence point of the underground and pop music scene, with the emergence of several bands and singers who marked the local music, such as Os Replicantes, Bebeto Alves, Os Cascavelletes, Nei Lisboa, TNT, Graforréia Xilarmônica, Júpiter Maçã, among others, and who were praised by the critics in Brazil. Again, Juremir Machado da Silva clarifies: "We created a combat territory. Those who were questioning social values were living there. But, more than that, the discussion of a political project for society was on the agenda".

In the cultural area, a new generation of visual artists, writers, musicians, and theater and film producers – many of them receiving recognition abroad – work alongside the established figures of the previous generation. Among this group are, for example, Vera Chaves Barcellos, Luis Fernando Verissimo, Borghettinho, Lya Luft, Jorge Furtado, João Gilberto Noll, and Regina Silveira. The universities have contributed to the cultural scene, fomenting research, the development of art criticism, and the formation of many new masters and doctors. In addition, several cultural centers were created, such as Santander Cultural, Mario Quintana House of Culture, Gasometer Plant and Iberê Camargo Foundation. Gaucho traditionalism, Afro culture and the "street arts" such as graffiti, carnival and hip-hop are also growing. With an infrastructure of dozens of cultural centers, theaters, cinemas, museums, memorials, and art galleries, the city has a cultural agenda during all the months of the year, including some of the largest Latin American cultural events, such as the Mercosul Biennial of Visual Arts, the theater festival Porto Alegre em Cena, and its Book Fair, the oldest in the country and the largest of its kind in the open air, as well as numerous concerts by international artists.

Many cultural institutions, however, suffer from a chronic lack of resources, especially the public ones, with damage to their services and equipment. On the other hand, traditional popular festivals such as the Farroupilha Week celebrations and the Procession of Our Lady of Navigators continue to attract large crowds, as do the LGBT Free Parades and the sunny Sundays at the Gasometer or along the Brique da Redenção, which become great moments of harmonious collective conviviality. In sports, some of its natives have already achieved international fame, such as Daiane dos Santos and Ronaldinho.

Other important moments in its recent history were the three first editions of the World Social Forum, in 2001, 2002 and 2003; the inclusion in 2002 of its historical center in the Monumenta Program of the Ministry of Culture - IDB, with the support of UNESCO; the visit of Pope John Paul II in 1980, and, in its condition of state capital, the repeated marches and concentrations of demonstrators from all over Rio Grande in front of Piratini Palace to demand attitudes from the state government, such as the teachers and other public servants, the landless people, and the rural producers.

Today Porto Alegre has the largest metropolitan area in the south of the country and the fourth most populous in Brazil, with 3,959,807 inhabitants, and the third wealthiest. It has received numerous distinctions, among them: it is the "Metropolis nº1" in quality of life in Brazil; in Spain it received the Educating City award; it is a national reference in selective garbage collection, with 100% collection; it was the first Brazilian city to implement Guardianship Councils and the Child and Adolescent Statute; it was chosen by the UN, along with three other Latin American cities, to integrate a pilot experience on Intermunicipal Cooperation; it is the headquarters of the International Free Software Forum; and it was the only city outside the United States invited to participate in the Green Forum 2007, in Miami. It occupies the eighth position among the most visited cities in Brazil by foreign tourists, and is a key city in the MERCOSUR dynamics. In 2009 about 1.4 million people lived in Porto Alegre, being the 11th most populous city in Brazil.

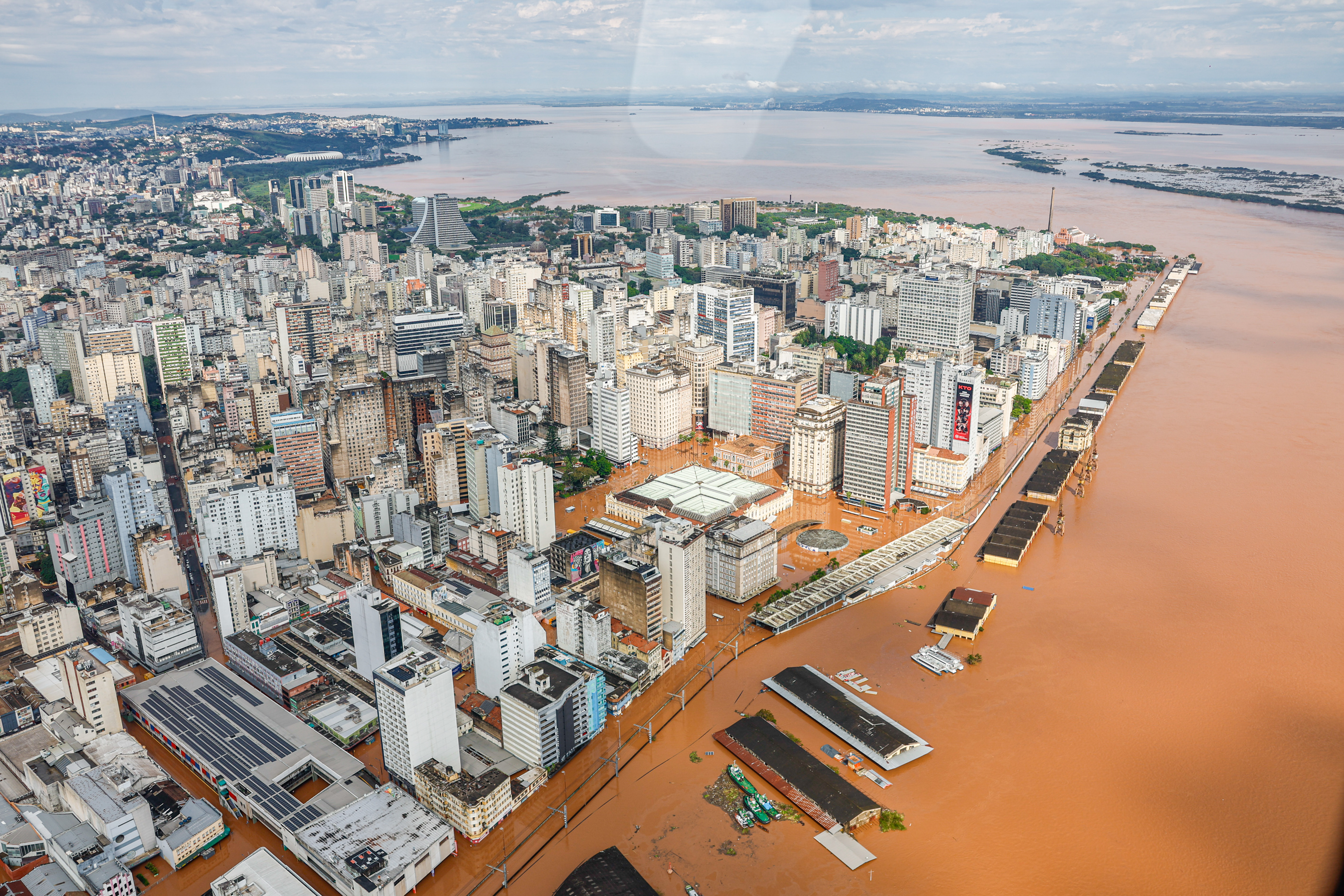
Downtown Porto Alegre flooded in 2024

.

In 2024, the city and other neighboring areas were flooded thanks to heavy rain. (See 2024 Rio Grande do Sul floods).

== Other historical images ==
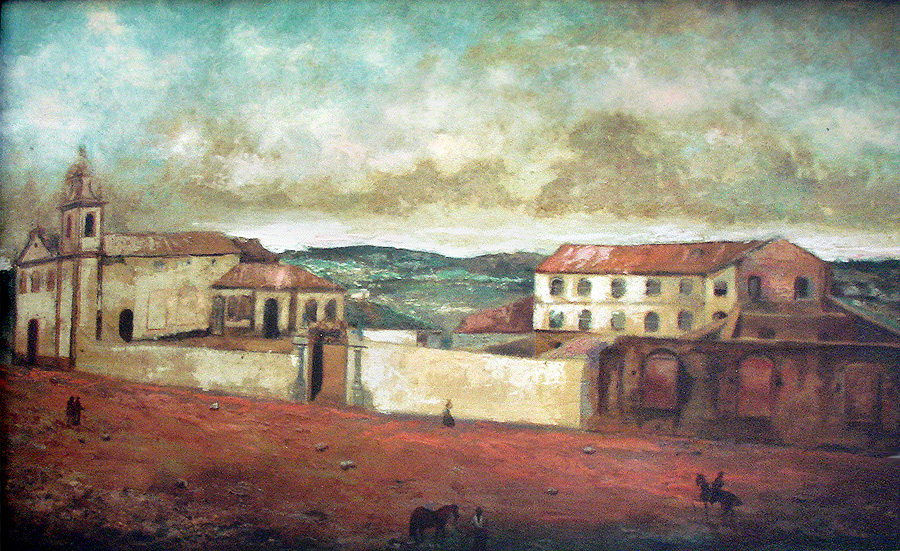
Santa Casa de Misericórdia in the mid-19th century, unknown author.

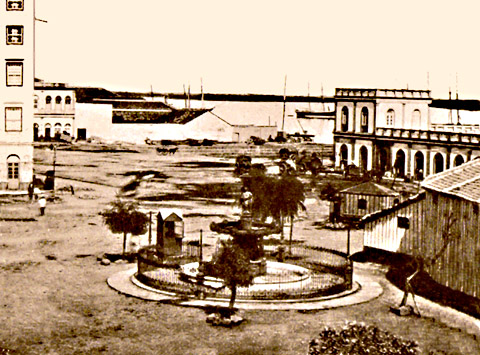
Luigi Terragno: Old Paradise Square with the Public Market in the background, 1877.

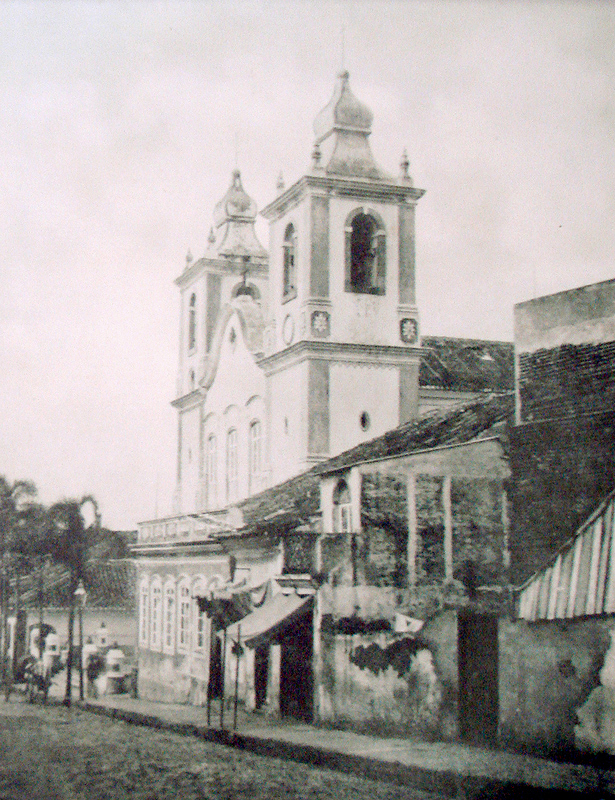
Old Church of Our Lady of the Rosary, demolished.

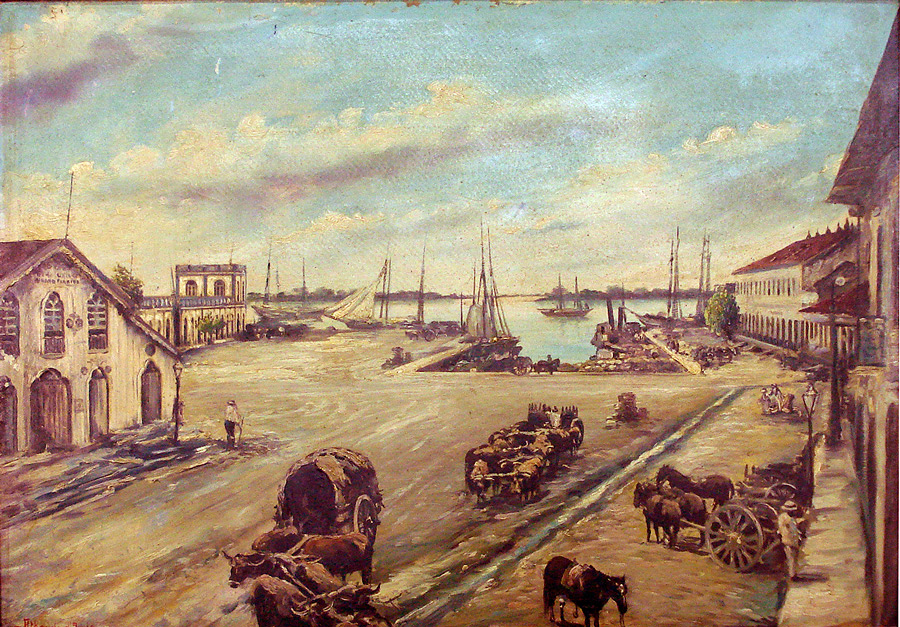
Athayde d'Avila: Doca das Flores, c.1880, today the area occupied by the Pereira Parobé Square.
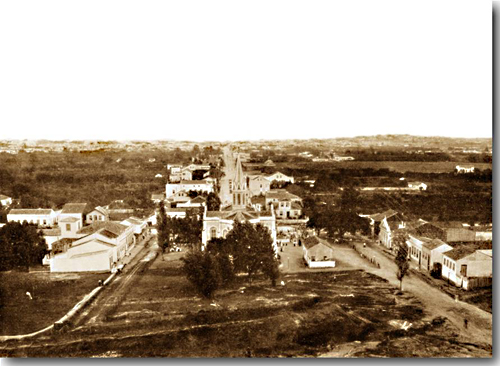
Virgilio Calegari: Beginning of the formation of the Menino Deus neighborhood, 1900.

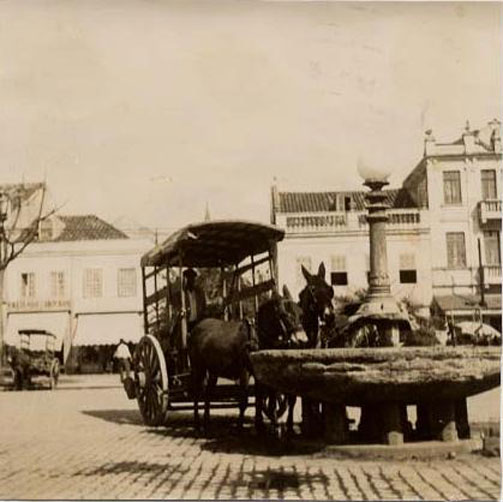
Virgilio Calegari: Drinking fountain at Rui Barbosa Square, 1900-1910.

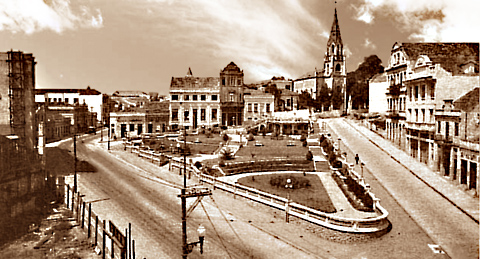
Otávio Rocha Square in 1930.

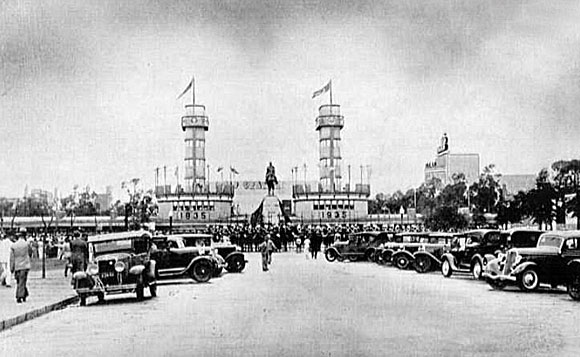
Modernist Pavilions at the Farroupilha Centennial Exposition, 1935.

== See also ==
- History of Rio Grande do Sul
- Positivism
- Campanha da Legalidade
- Architecture of Porto Alegre
