= Alfredo Scherer =

His Eminence Alfredo Scherer
- Archbishop of Porto Alegre
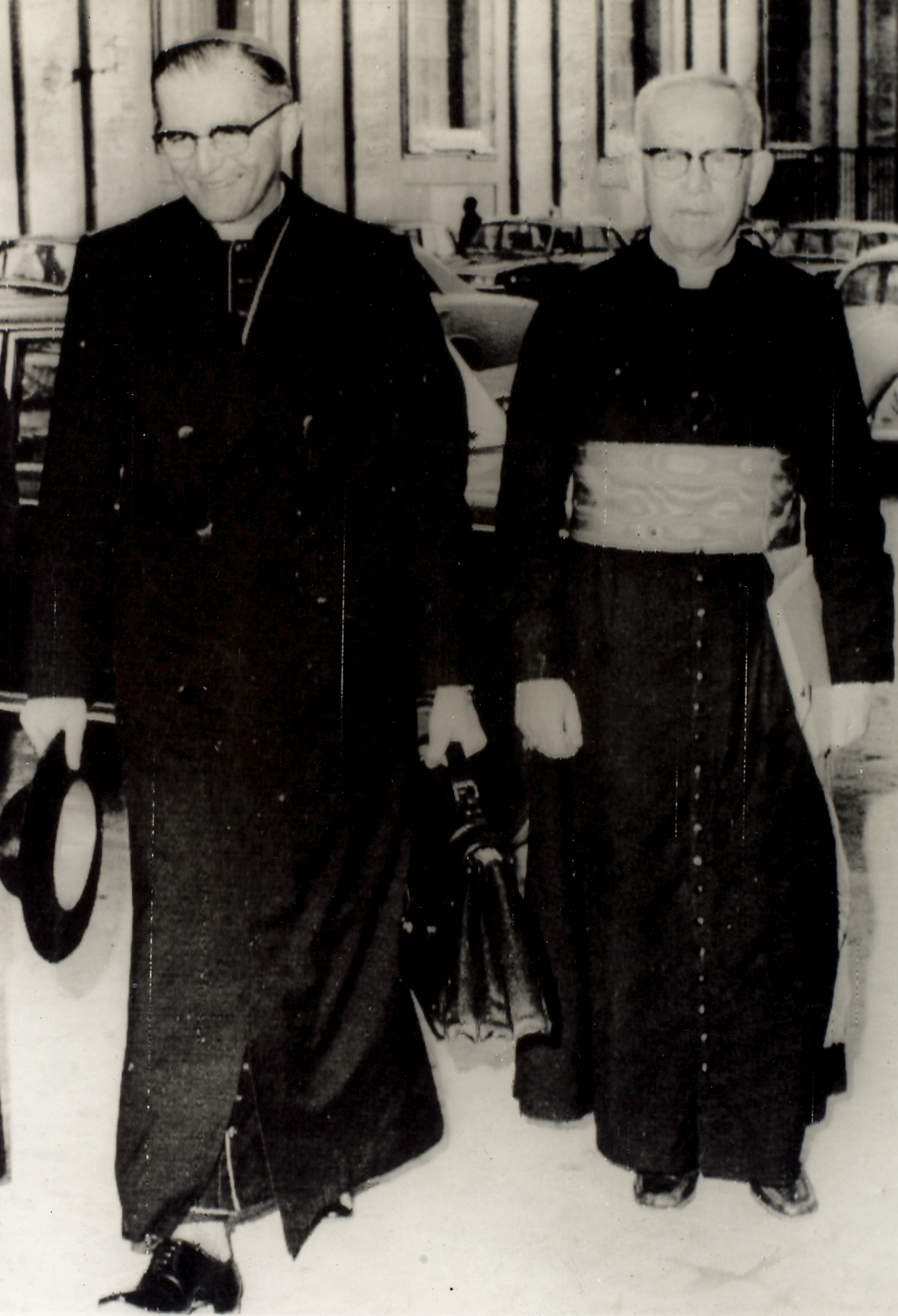
- Cardinal Scherer (right) with Cardinal Eugênio Salles in 1971.
- Church: Roman Catholic Church
- Archdiocese: Porto Alegre
- See: Porto Alegre
- Appointed: 30 December 1946
- Installed: 23 February 1947
- Retired: 29 August 1981
- Predecessor: João Batista Becker
- Successor: João Colling
- Other post: Cardinal-Priest of Nostra Signora de La Salette (1969-96)
- Previous posts: Titular Bishop of Hemeria (1946); Auxiliary Bishop of Porto Alegre; Vice-President of the Brazilian Episcopal Conference (1968-70); President of the Brazilian Episcopal Conference (1970-71)

Orders
- Ordination: 3 April 1926 by Basilio Pompili
- Consecration: 23 February 1947 by Carlo Chiarlo
- Created cardinal: 28 April 1969 by Pope Paul VI
- Rank: Cardinal-Priest

Personal details
- Born: Alfredo Vicente Scherer; 5 February 1903 Bom Princípio, Rio Grande do Sul, Brazil
- Died: 8 March 1996 (aged 93) Porto Alegre, Brazil
- Buried: Porto Alegre Cathedral
- Parents: Pedro Scherer; Anna Opermann
- Education: Pontifical Gregorian University
- Motto: Evangelizare misit me
- Coat of arms

Alfredo Vicente Scherer (5 February 1903–9 March 1996) was a Brazilian cardinal of the Roman Catholic Church. He served as Archbishop of Porto Alegre, Brazil from 1947 to 1981, and was elevated to the rank of cardinal in 1969.

== Biography ==
Alfredo Vicente Scherer was born in Bom Princípio, Rio Grande do Sul, as the second child of Peter and Anna (née Opermann) Scherer. His nephew Odilo Scherer became Archbishop of São Paulo in 2007. He studied at the seminary in Porto Alegre and the Pontifical Gregorian University in Rome, where he was ordained to the priesthood on April 3, 1926. He then served as private secretary to Archbishop João Batista Becker until 1933, when he began pastoral work in Porto Alegre.

On 13 June 1946, Scherer was appointed the first auxiliary bishop of Porto Alegre and titular bishop of Hemeria by Pope Pius XII. However, Archbishop Becker died two days later, on 15 June, before Scherer received his episcopal consecration. Scherer was named as his successor as Archbishop of Porto Alegre on the following 30 December. He was consecrated on 23 February 1947, by Archbishop Carlo Chiarlo, Apostolic Nuncio to Brazil, with Bishops José Baréa and José de Almeida Baptista serving as co-consecrators.

In reference to divorce, the Archbishop once called for "prayers to God to take away from Brazil the calamity which threatens Christian families". Scherer also gave weekly radio broadcasts against "anarchists and followers of Communism" within the Church. He was strongly opposed to liberation theology, and denounced providing birth control pills to "uninformed, impoverished and unattended women" as "a criminal act".

From 1962 to 1965, he attended the Second Vatican Council and was recognized as one of the leading conservative prelates during the 1960s and 1970s. However, Scherer did support the succession of the left-wing João Goulart as president of Brazil following the resignation of Jânio Quadros, as required by the Constitution of Brazil.

Pope Paul VI created him cardinal priest of Nostra Signora de La Salette in the consistory of 28 April 1969. Scherer was one of the cardinal electors who participated in the conclaves of August and October 1978, which elected Popes John Paul I and John Paul II respectively. In January 1980, he was stabbed and robbed by unknown assailants, who left him in a ditch outside Porto Alegre when he could not meet their demands for more money.

He resigned as archbishop on 29 August 1981.

Scherer died in Porto Alegre on 8 March 1996 at age 93. He was buried near the altar of the Cathedral of Porto Alegre. In 2003, a commemorative site was arranged at his place of birth in Bom Princípio.

He was provedor of the Fraternity of the Holy House of Mercy until his death, he was also a member of the Rio Grande do Sul Institute of History and Geography.

Catholic Church titles
Preceded by João Batista Becker	Archbishop of Porto Alegre; 1946–1981	Succeeded by João Colling
