= Independência, Porto Alegre =

Neighborhood in Porto Alegre, Rio Grande do Sul, Brazil

Coordinates: 30.029°S 51.213°W

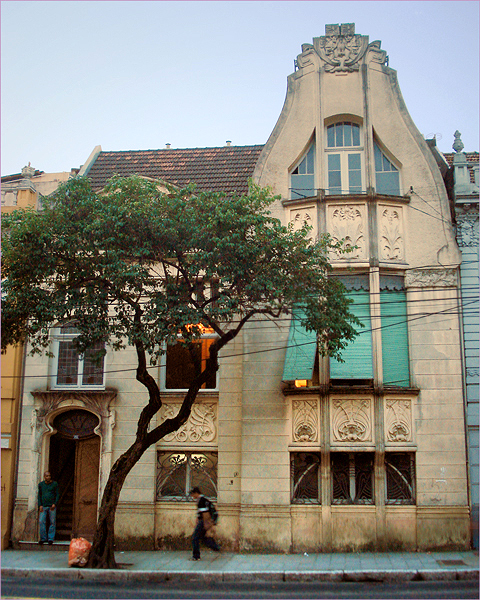
The Casa Godoy, built in 1907.

Independência (literally Independence in English) is a tiny neighborhood of the city of Porto Alegre, the state capital of Rio Grande do Sul in Brazil.

The neighborhood was created by Law 2022 of December 7, 1959. There is located a highly regarded and traditional private school of the city, the Marista Nossa Senhora do Rosário school.

== Demographics ==
- Population: 6,407 (in 2000)
- Area: 40 ha (0.4 km^{2})
- Density: 160/km^{2}
- Number of housing units 2,761

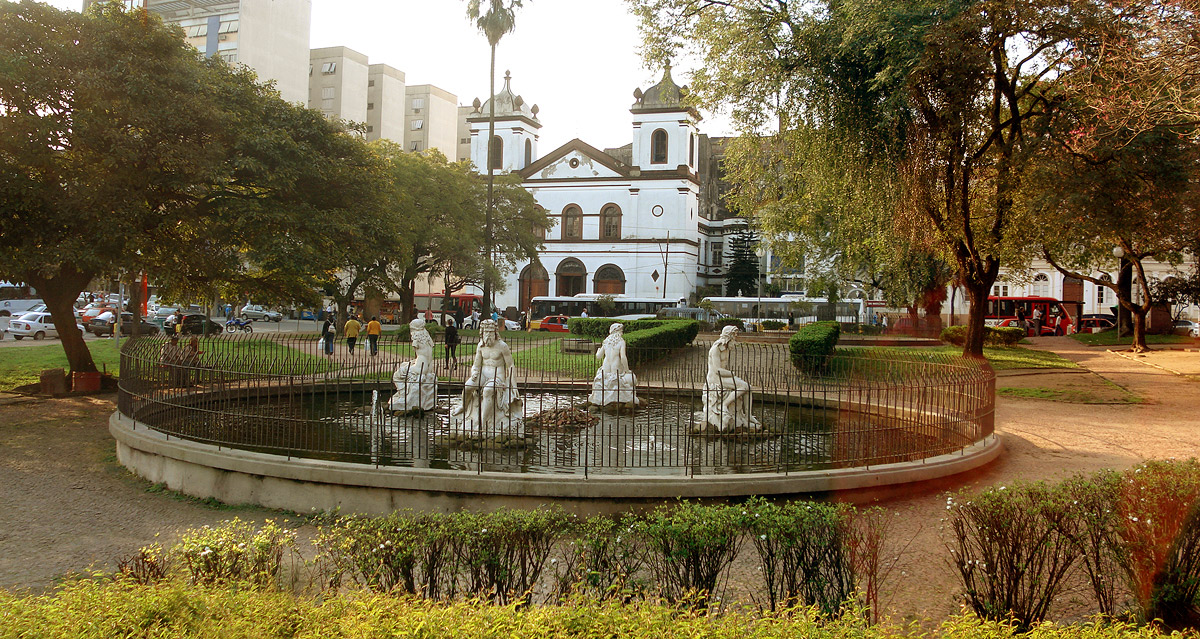
The Dom Sebastião Square.

== See also ==
- Neighborhoods of Porto Alegre
- Beneficência Portuguesa de Porto Alegre
- Independência Avenue
