= Godoy House =

- Casa Godoy (Portuguese)
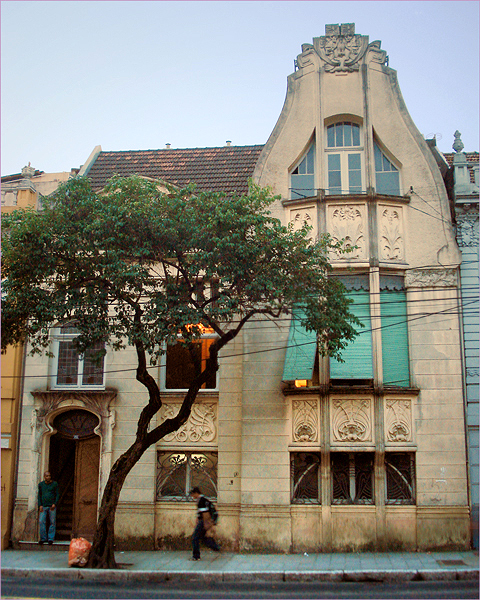

- Location within Brazil
- 30°01′45.2″S 51°13′00.5″W
- Location: 456 Independência Avenue, Porto Alegre, RS, Brazil

History
- Built: 1904 - 1907

Site notes
- Area: 719.39 m^{2} (7,743.4 sq ft)
- Architect: Hermann Menschen
- Architectural style: Art Nouveau

The Godoy House is a historic building on Independência Avenue in the city of Porto Alegre, Rio Grande do Sul, Brazil. The house is one of the rare remaining buildings in the Art Nouveau style in Porto Alegre, dating from 1907.

== History ==
Aside from its architectural importance, the house saw intense social activity throughout its history. It was originally built for Arno Bastian Meyer and his family between 1904 and 1907. Later, with the separation of the Meyers, the house was rented to the Greco family. In 1926 businessman Francisco Tschiedel purchased the house, and in 1939 it was acquired by the psychiatrist doctor Jacintho Godoy, an illustrious social figure of the time, and the house became the meeting point for notables of Porto Alegre's society between the years of 1939 and 1959.

The house was built utilizing imported technology at the time, with masonry and iron works in harmony with its style. Much care was taken with every detail of the house, from the choice of materials used, to the embellishments and ceilings and walls, and furniture, forming a notable coherent style throughout.

The architect, Hermann Menschen, was a German immigrant who worked for Rudolph Ahrons' renowned engineering company, and was responsible for its projects department until 1907.

The house's three stories, totaling 719.39 m^{2} (7,743.4 sq ft), are divided as ground floor, second floor, and loft. The facade is embellished with floral and whiplash motifs characteristic of the style, and elaborated wrought iron bars adorn the windows on the ground floor. The only opening to the loft is framed in an impressive gable that dominates the facade. Above the front door there is a relatively small stained glass window.

The interior, Dr. Godoy installed his home office on the ground floor where the above-ground cellar used to be, connected to the rear of the house where the kitchen, annex, and backyard are located. On the second floor, a hallway interconnects the four bedrooms and the bathroom. On the front part of the house on the second floor was located the drawing room, and to the rear the dining room, smoking room, and music room, all connected to a veranda with ornate iron balustrade. Many notable frescoes, stained glass, and decor remain, reminiscent from the original construction.

The Godoy House was listed for preservation on November 26, 1996, and acquired by the City Hall. Since 1998, the Coordenação da Memória Cultural da Secretaria Municipal de Cultura e a Equipe do Patrimônio Histórico e Cultural operates at the house.

== See also ==
- Architecture of Porto Alegre
- Argentina Palace
