= Our Lady of La Salette Church =

Our Lady of La Salette Church may refer to:

- Our Lady of La Salette Church, Paris
- Our Lady of La Salette Church, Rome
