= Independência Avenue (Porto Alegre) =

Avenue in Porto Alegre, Rio Grande do Sul, Brazil

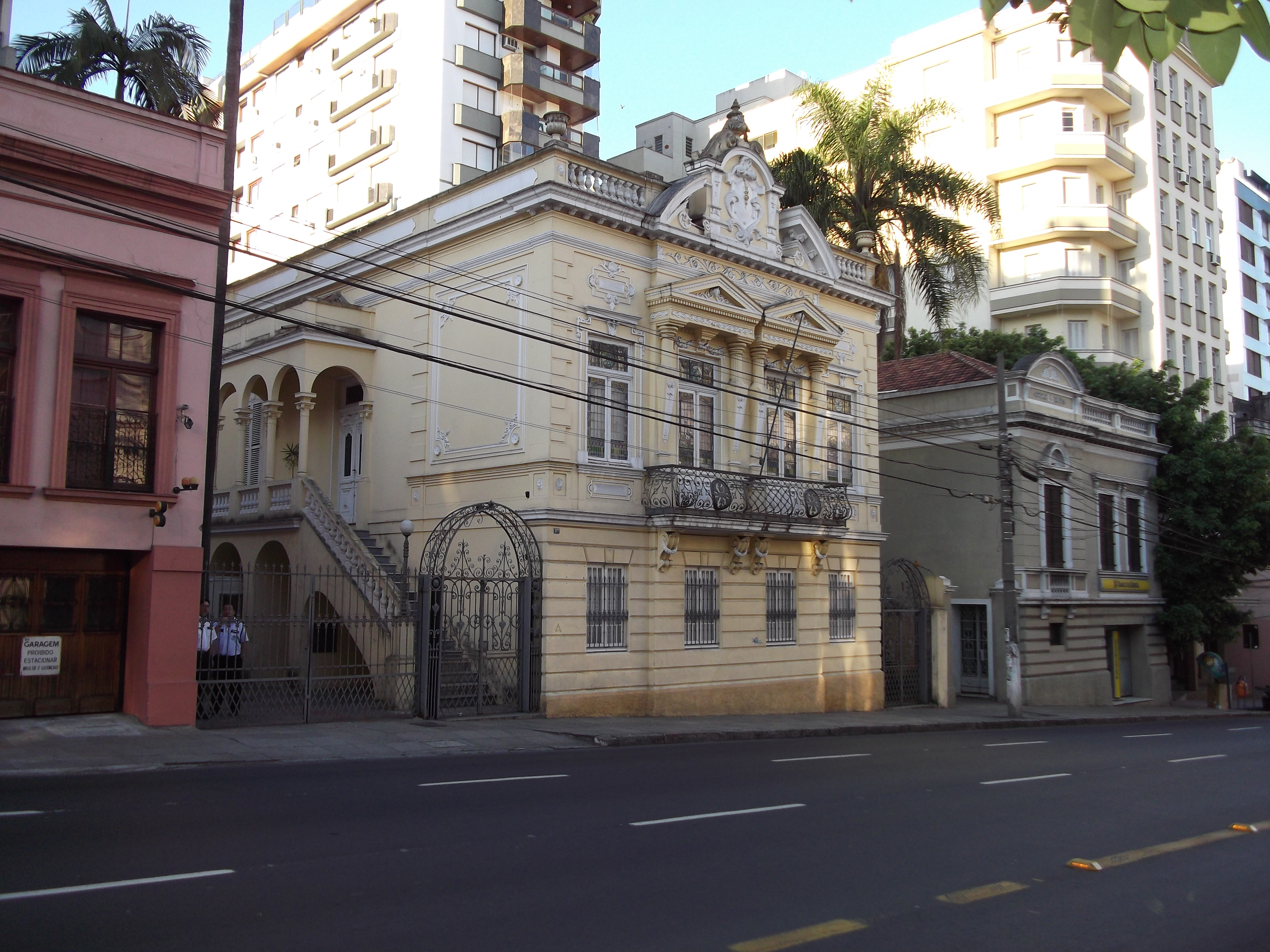
A stretch of Independência Avenue with one of its historic mansions, the Argentina Palace.

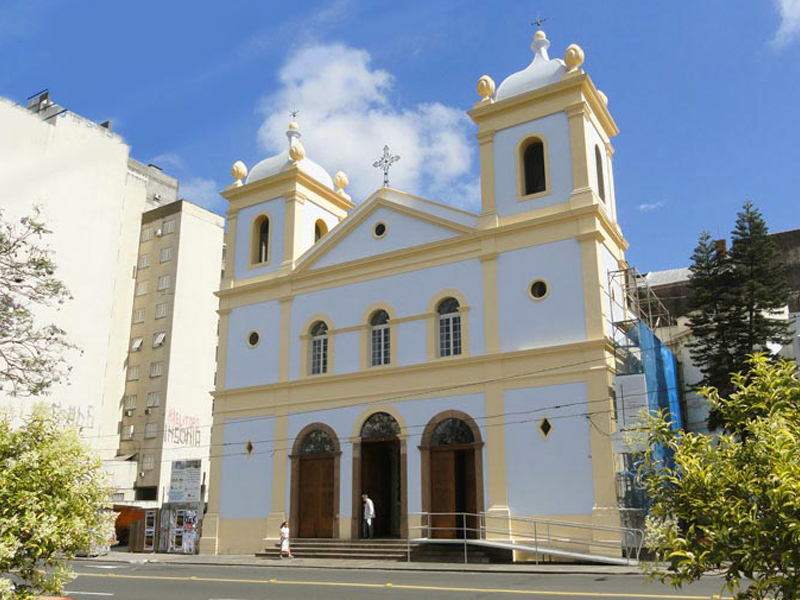
Church of Our Lady of the Conception, located on the avenue.

Independência Avenue (English: Avenida Independência) is an important road in the Brazilian city of Porto Alegre, capital of the state of Rio Grande do Sul. It is the main axis of the Independência neighborhood. It starts at Dom Feliciano Square, in the historic center of the city, and ends at Mostardeiro Street, in the Independência neighborhood, as a continuation of the Rua da Praia.

The avenue emerged as one of the exits from the village of Porto Alegre, going in the direction of Aldeia dos Anjos, in Gravataí, which was founded in the same period. There are references to this path in the City Council records at least since 1829. At this time, the avenue was known as Estrada dos Moinhos de Vento (English: Mills of Wind Road), because it crossed the farm where Antônio Martins Barbosa had installed mills. At this point, the route was deviated, skirting the limits of Chácara da Brigadeira, property of Josefa Eulália de Azevedo, widow of Brigadier Rafael Pinto Bandeira, and the rains opened large ditches, hindering traffic.

During the Ragamuffin War (1835-1845), all the first urbanization works on the road were interrupted. However, in 1843, the City Council recognized the need to straighten the road and fix the alignment of the houses that were emerging in its extension. In 1845, the City Council ordered its attorney to effect the judicial alignment of the Mills of Wind Road according to the urban plan drawn by the municipal planner, and to provide for the repair of damaged stretches. In the following year, the definitive rectification of the entire first stretch was provided, with the payment of a large indemnity for the expropriation of part of the Chácara da Brigadeira lands. From this time on, the road was known as a continuation of Rua da Praia, but in October 1857, by a decree of the City Council, it was renamed Rua da Independência (English: Independence Street).

A few years later, after the start of the implementation of the water pipe system in the houses along the road, the street fell into a state of abandonment for a long period. In 1885, there were still no curbstones or gutters, and the sidewalk only reached a small stretch; in 1892, the street had 96 houses. After the Proclamation of the Republic, major investments were made to pave its entire length, which, at the time, reached the current Júlio de Castilhos Square. The work went on until the second decade of the 20th century, still with irregular stones; in 1925, paving with cobblestones began. On October 24, 1933, its name was changed to General Flores da Cunha Avenue, and the shape it has kept until today was fixed on November 22, 1937.

At the beginning of the 20th century, the avenue became a preferred location for traditional families who built beautiful palatial homes there between 1900 and 1930. However, due to the urbanization of other neighborhoods, the former residents have abandoned the area, causing many of the properties to fall into disrepair. The old mansions have given way to large commercial and residential buildings. Despite this, the avenue is still home to many important buildings, some of them listed as historical heritage, such as Argentina Palace, Saraiva Residence, Godoy House and Torelly House. On Independência Avenue are also located part of the Santa Casa de Misericórdia, the traditional Nossa Senhora do Rosário School, the Our Lady of the Conception Church, and the Beneficência Portuguesa.

== Important buildings ==
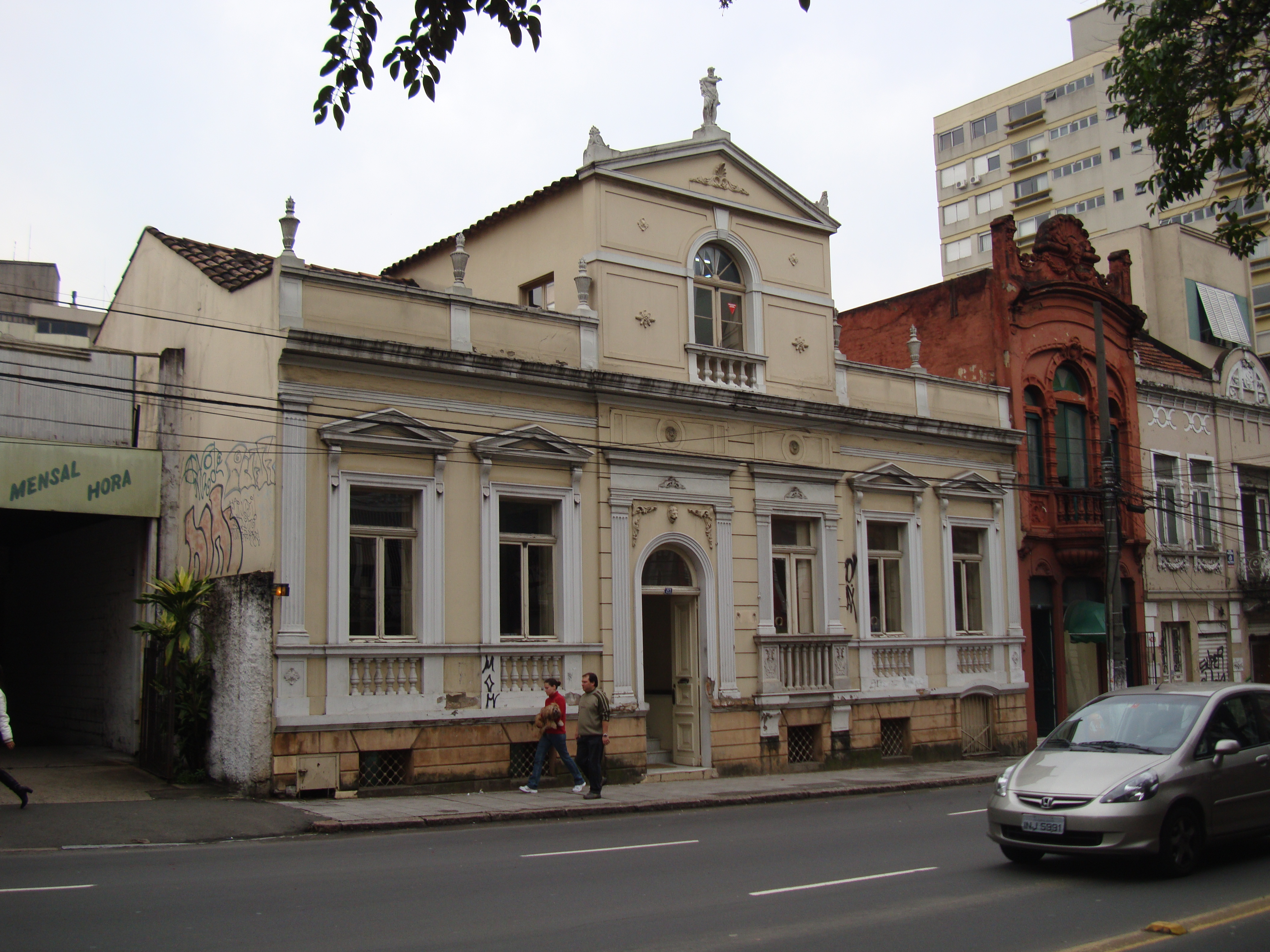
Torelly House.

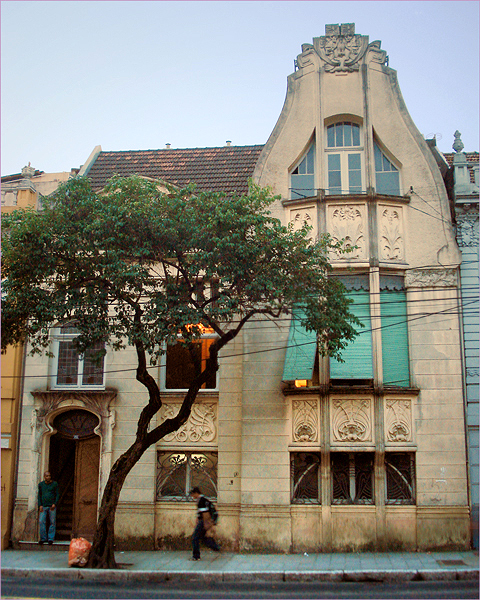
Godoy House.

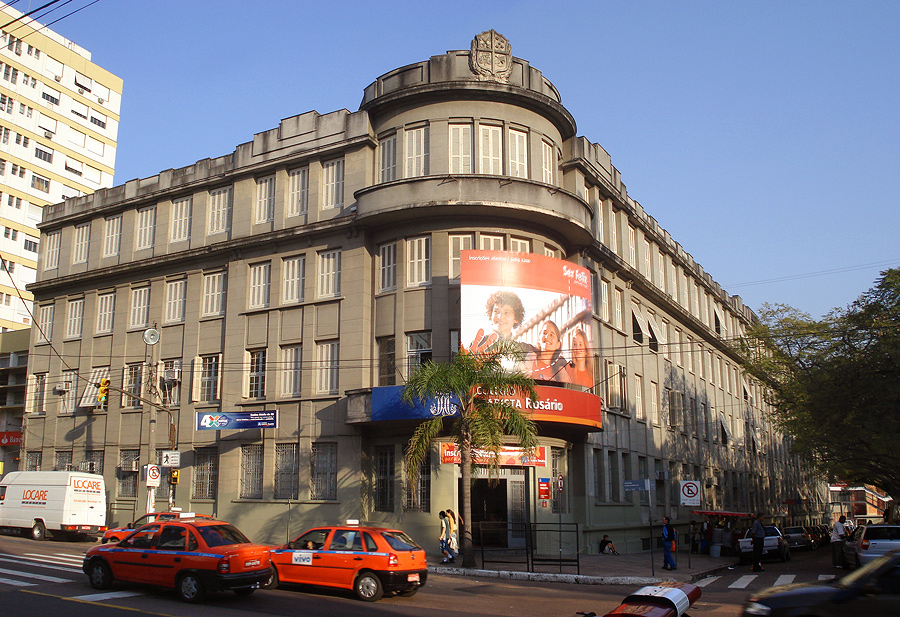
Rosário School, at the corner of Independência Avenue and Dom Sebastião Square.

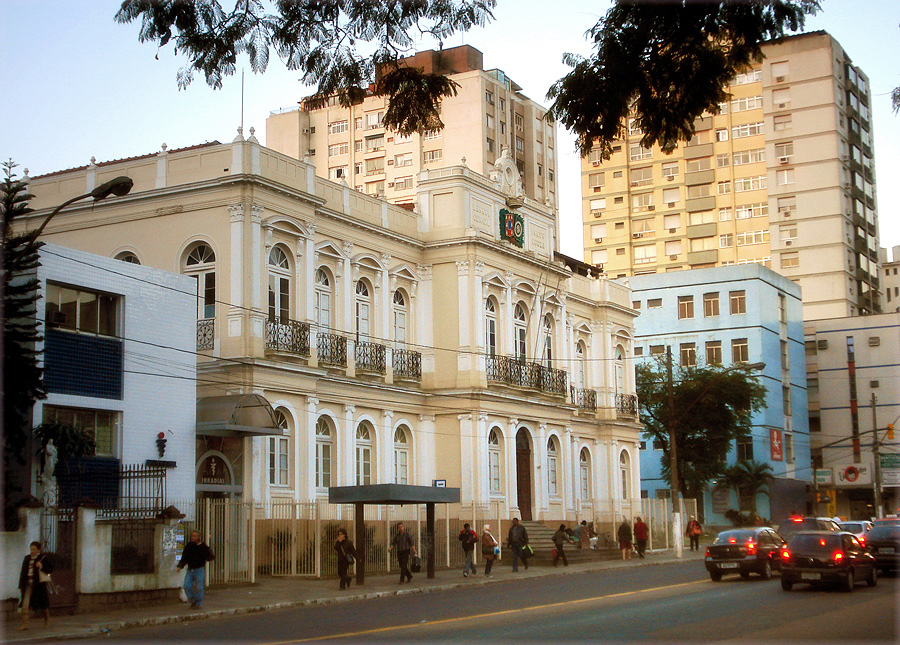
Beneficência Portuguesa de Porto Alegre.
