= Mother Church of the Immaculate Conception (Viamão) =

18th-century church in Porto Alegre, Brazil

- Igreja Matriz de Nossa Senhora da Conceição
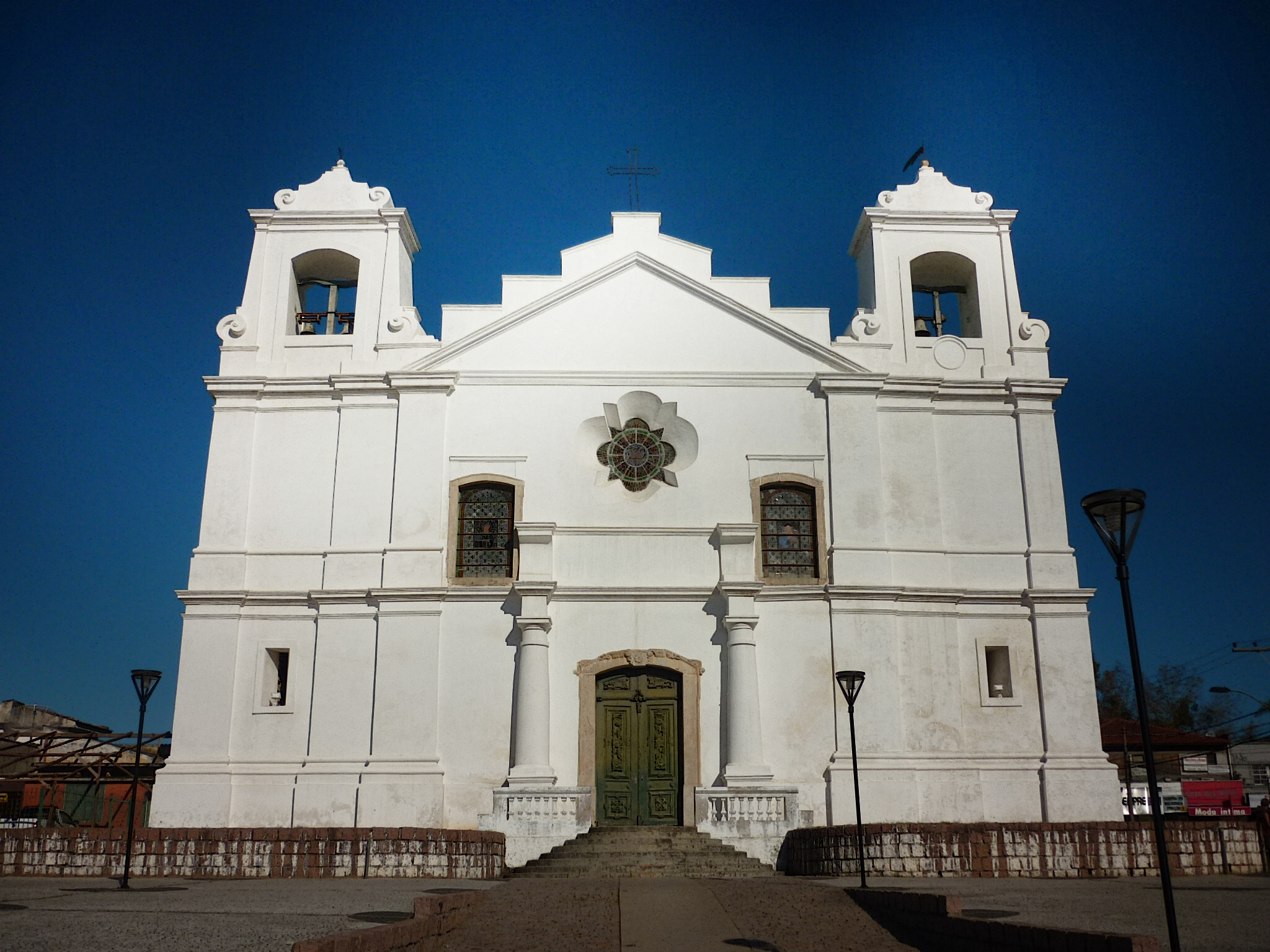
- Façade
- Mother Church of the Immaculate Conception
- 30°4′56″S 51°1′26″W
- Location: Viamão, Porto Alegre
- Address: 53 Canon Bernardo Machado dos Santos Square (Praça Côn. Bernardo Machado dos Santos, 53)
- Country: Brazil
- Denomination: Catholic
- Website: https://www.facebook.com/paroquianossasenhoradaconceicaoviamao/

Architecture
- Heritage designation: IPHAN, 1938
- Style: Baroque
- Completed: 1769

Administration
- Archdiocese: Roman Catholic Archdiocese of Porto Alegre

The Igreja Matriz de Nossa Senhora da Conceição is a Brazilian Catholic temple located in the city of Viamão, state of Rio Grande do Sul. It is the second-oldest church in the state and the seat of the oldest parish of the Archdiocese of Porto Alegre. It is also the main architectural landmark of Viamão.

The church was listed by IPHAN on July 20, 1938.

Its presence organized the urbanization of the central area of the city, and its history is surrounded by legends and traditions.

== History ==
From 1732 on, Rio Grande de São Pedro - as Rio Grande do Sul was known - began to attract colonizers who settled in the Viamão region. Elevated to the category of freguesia in 1747, in 1763 it received the seat of the province's government, which until then was based in Vila do Rio Grande, and that was transferred due to the Spanish invasion. Viamão remained the seat of government until 1773, when it, for practical reasons, moved to the village formed near the port of Viamão, located in the Guaíba Lake, current Porto Alegre, during the government of José Marcelino de Figueiredo. In 1880, it was dismembered from Porto Alegre to become a town and the seat of an independent municipality.

This temple, dedicated to the Immaculate Conception, one of the most significant symbols of local identity, replaced a chapel founded by Francisco Carvalho da Cunha, who had settled in the fields of Viamão, in the place called Estância Grande. The rancher donated half a league of the land of his property for the construction, plus 40 mares, 4 horses, 20 cows, and two bulls, among other animals. The official permission for construction came through the ecclesiastic provision of September 14, 1741. The date was fixed as the official foundation date of the city. On May 15, 1746, the first mass was celebrated. The surrounding region quickly began to receive settlers, in 1747 the parish was created, separating it from Laguna, and the chapel received a matriz ("Mother Church") status. From then on it would centralize much of the social and political activity of the city. Besides the liturgical functions, the chapel housed brotherhoods of expressive social and beneficent performance, hosted festivities, registered marriages, births, deaths, and wills (which had civil validity), was the place for electing councilors, and in its doors were posted public notices, decrees, and laws. At the time, there was a close association between civil and religious power.

The project of the church was attributed to Brigadier José Custódio de Sá e Faria, but it was built by Francisco da Costa Senne. Building began in 1766, and the first mass was celebrated by Father José Malta on April 6, 1770. It is possible that what is seen today is a third church, supposedly inaugurated on June 11, 1797. The documentation about its construction stages is not clear, but there are allusions in the books of the Irmandade do Santíssimo Sacramento that by the end of the 1780s, the building was already decaying, and the brotherhood, with the approval of the population, determined that stone should be taken away for a new church and that elements of the frontispiece and towers of the old one should be used on the façade of the new building. Whether this was in fact carried out is not certain; it may have amounted to repairs to the original building. Athos Damasceno assures that the current building is the one constructed in 1766 and completed three years later.

The Igreja Matriz de Nossa Senhora da Conceição is the second oldest church in the state, only newer than the Catedral de São Pedro ("Saint Peter Cathedral") in Rio Grande, and one of the most praised by former foreign travelers visiting the region, most notably by Augustin Saint-Hilaire in 1820 and Nicolau Dreys in 1849. Saint-Hilaire said:

"After São Paulo I had not seen any church comparable to this one, possessing two towers, well preserved, extremely neat, clear, and tastefully ornamented. By looking at the churches in Brazil, we can see how capable Brazilians would be, if their education were more careful and if they had some good models to orient themselves. Whoever knows only the churches of the villages of France, will find that the arts in our country are still in their infancy, given the bad taste of the works, the barbarous style of the ornaments, the violation of the rules of art and so many other defects."

At the time of the Ragamuffin War, the need for urgent repairs was already evident, but these would only be carried out in 1854, by Francisco José Pacheco Filho. In 1938, it was declared a National Historic and Artistic Heritage Site by IPHAN. Nothing remains from colonial times around it, and the church remains a unique relic of the town's eighteenth-century architecture.

== Structure ==
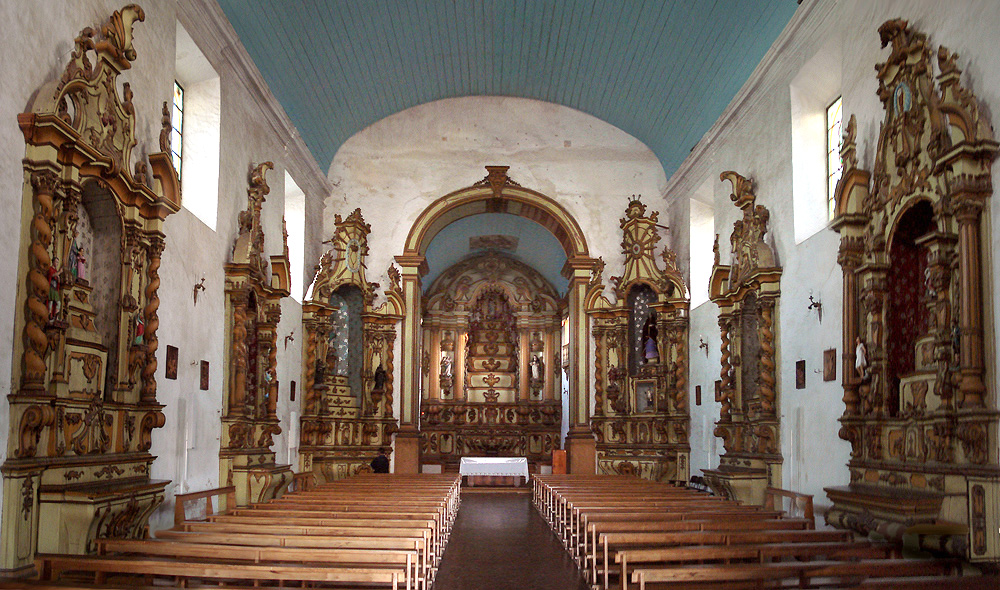
Interior: Nave with side altars and chancel at the back

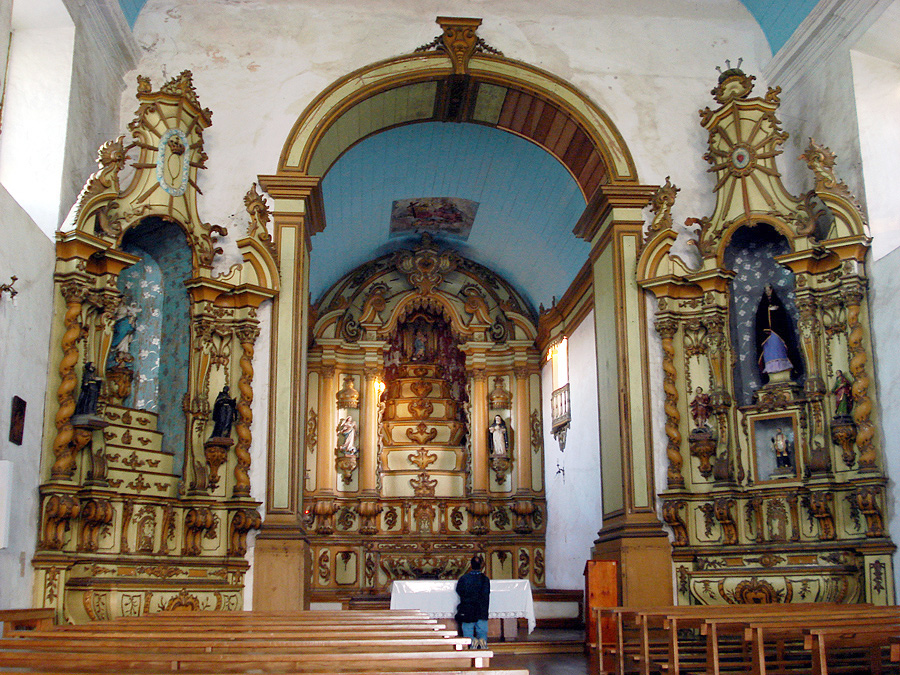
Chancel and altars

Throughout the 19th century, the building underwent several renovations, the details of which are little known. The current configuration seems to differ significantly from what is described in the terms of the construction contract signed by Francisco da Costa Senne (where the author of the project is not specified), which foresaw a temple more similar to the colonial pattern of the center of the country, with a large window above the entrance door, two windows on the sides, all ornamented with lintels, jambs, sill, and moldings. The cornices were to be designed only on the alignment of the lintels, the internal ornamentation in carving was to be much richer, extending to all parts with wood, and the windows of the nave would have a frame, closing leaves, sills, lintels, and jambs.

The result of successive interventions still preserves a recognizable general Baroque plan, with Rococo elements in the decoration. Its thick walls and imposing appearance resemble a fortress, which has been interpreted as a reflection of the period of border disputes between the Portuguese and Spanish territories in South America. It has been highly praised for its monumentality and the beauty of its carved decoration, which some authors attribute to Francisco da Costa Senne. According to Mariza Lópes, the high altar, whose style differs from the others, is by Bartolomeu Teixeira Guimarães. Marcia Bonnet says that it resembles - in structure, distribution of elements, and ornamental motifs - several other altarpieces located in different villages of the Captaincy of São Vicente, but does not identify an author.

Located in the wide central square of the city, the entrance is through a large churchyard with a small staircase and balustrade. The frontispiece, in granite from the city of Porto, is discreet, but the single door, central, shows rich Rococo carving. To the sides, two ornamental Tuscan columns end at the second level, where there are two arched windows with stained glass, and having in the center a quatrefoil with spikes between the lobes. Above, a pediment in a bare isosceles triangle is topped by a central cross and a stair profile above it. The cornice throughout the façade is narrow and unadorned.

The body of the church is flanked by two equal bell towers, with narrow openings near the base and open arches at the top level for the bells. They are wide and very thick, and have only a narrow stairway to the top. The spire has simple ornamentation with discrete scrolls and banners.

The rear façade is less wide, accompanied by the smaller dimensions of the chancel, and has only two narrow rectangular windows on the ground level and a small round oculus above, centrally located, and a visible gable roof. On both sides, there are first-floor annexes for the sacristy and the secretary's office, with independent entrances, also in colonial Baroque style.

The interior has tall windows, an unadorned ceiling with light blue painted slats, and a low arch. It has a single nave, divided only to delimit the chancel. To the left of the entrance, a simple baptistery can be seen, containing a stone baptismal font, and closed by a double-leaf door in turned wood. Above the entrance a large wooden choir, of simple geometric lines and supported by two equally discreet columns.

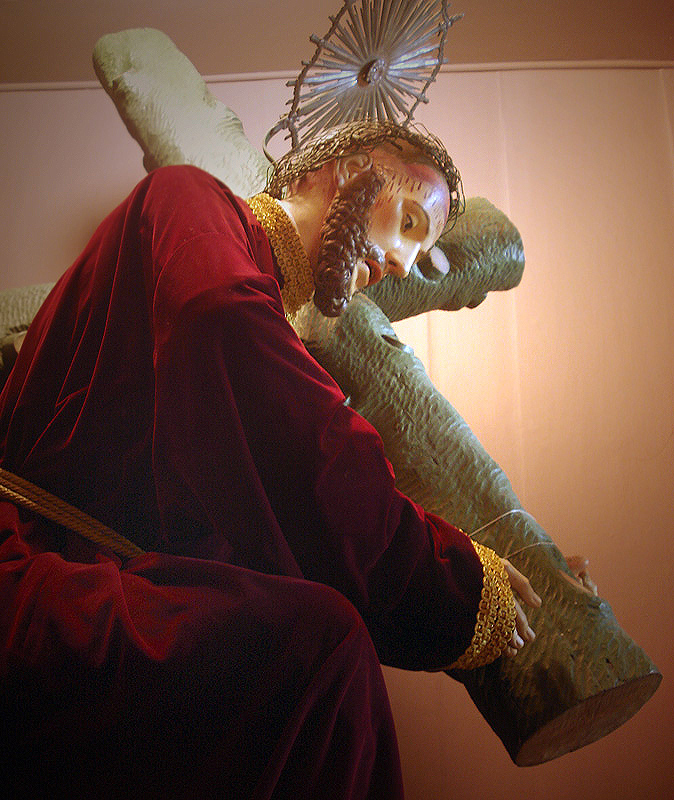
Senhor dos Passos ("Lord of the Steps"), (Jesus), in the sacristy

There are six side altars, dedicated to Saint Barbara, Michael the Archangel, Saint Anne, the Holy Spirit, Our Lady of the Rosary, and Our Lady of Sorrows, all with various levels and niches for other secondary images. The carvings feature Rococo stylistic elements with polished finishes and flame-like trimmings. While following a uniform general design, individual details vary, providing both cohesion and variation within the interior decoration.

In the chancel, with two high side windows, balusters, and decorated frames, stands the main altar in staircase, dedicated to Immaculate Conception, with secondary images of Our Lady of Peace and Rose of Lima. The ensemble is slightly different in style from the smaller altars, being more majestic, more architectural, and less decorative, recovering an older and more austere Baroque, but also contains detailed carving, with a pediment moved in interrupted arches, volutes, and medallions. Above, on the ceiling, appears the only specimen of mural painting in the entire interior (except for small floral ornaments under the choir), with a scene depicting the Holy Trinity.

Passing through the main chapel, one has access to the sacristy, on the left, where the pulpit is, removed from the nave for better preservation; an expressive collection of processional Flags of the Divine; and a small chapel also of Rococo workmanship with gilding, closed by glass doors, with two processional images, one representing the Dead Lord and the other the Lord of the Steps (Jesus).

== See also ==
- Roman Catholic Archdiocese of Porto Alegre
- Metropolitan Cathedral of Our Lady Mother of God, Porto Alegre
- Church of Our Lady of the Conception (Porto Alegre)
- History of Porto Alegre
- Baroque in Brazil

== Bibliography ==
- Passos, Marilise Moscardini dos (2018). O processo de patrimonialização da Matriz Nossa Senhora da Conceição - Viamão, RS (BA thesis) (in Brazilian Portuguese). Porto Alegre, Brazil: Universidade Federal do Rio Grande do Sul.
