= Beneficência Portuguesa de São Paulo =

Hospital in São Paulo, Brazil

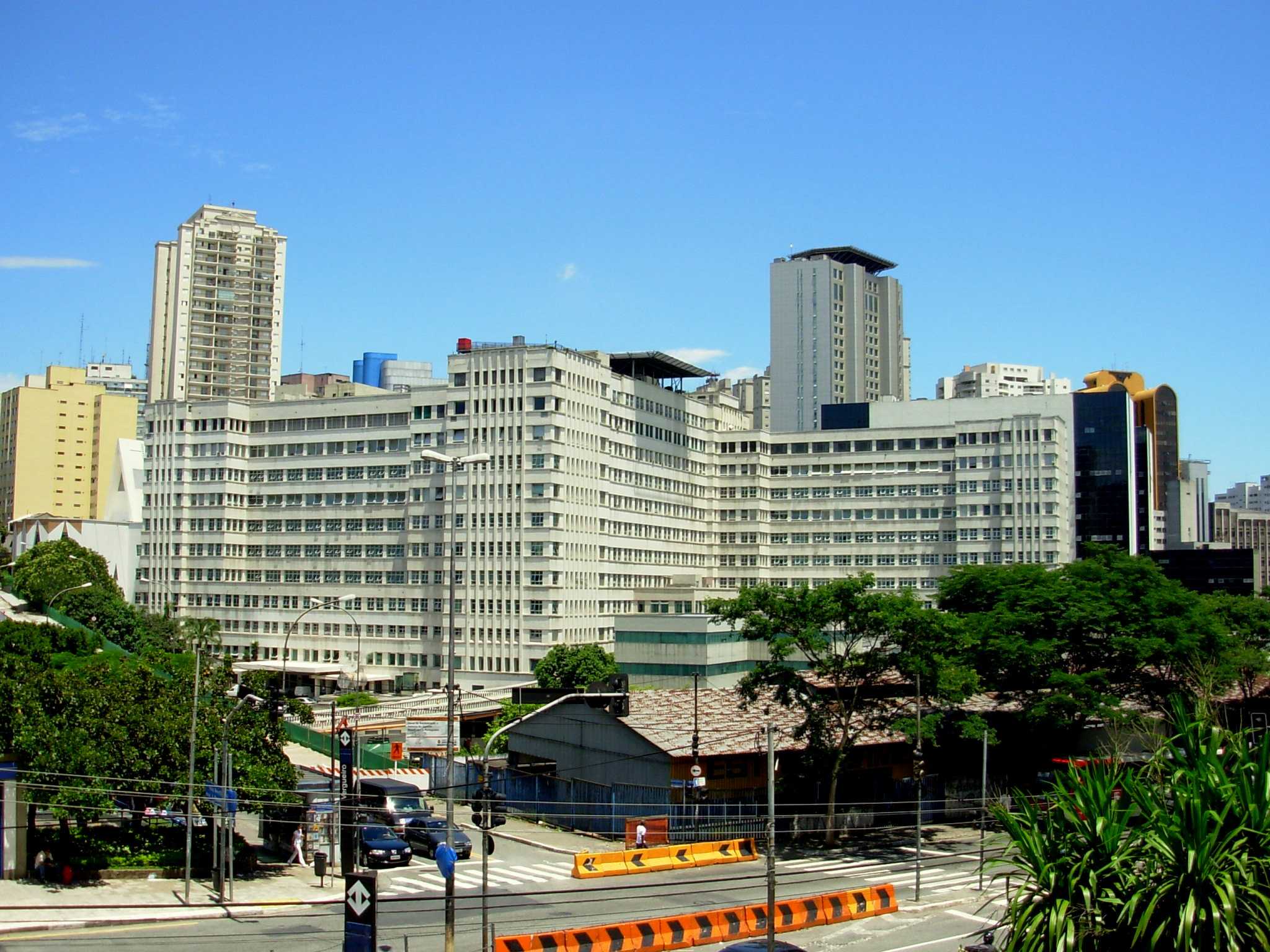
- View of the hospital.

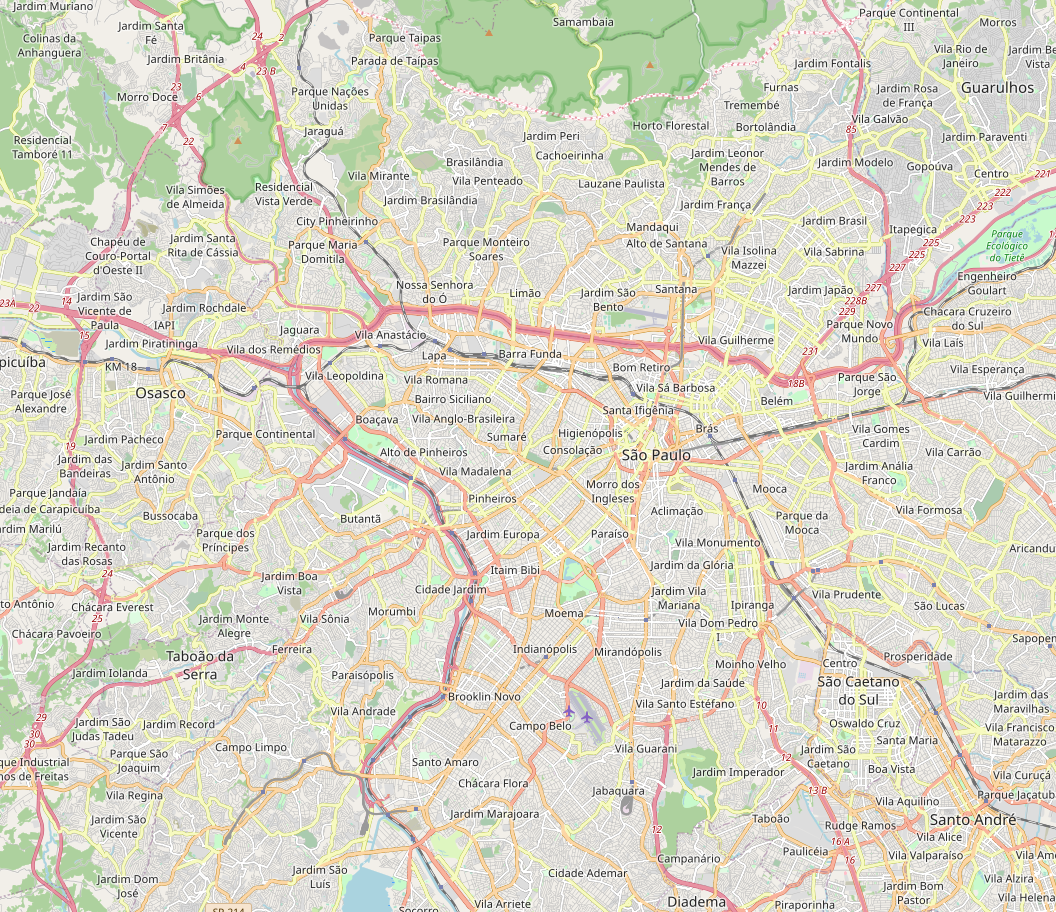

Geography
- Location: São Paulo, São Paulo; Brazil
- Coordinates: 23°34′04″S 46°38′29″W

Services
- Beds: 1080

History
- Opened: October 2, 1859; 166 years ago

Links
- Website: https://www.bp.org.br/

The Real e Benemérita Associação Portuguesa de Beneficência ComC • ComM • GCM, also known as Beneficência Portuguesa de São Paulo or BP, located in the city of São Paulo, Brazil, is one of the largest and most advanced private hospital complexes in Latin America.

Situated in the Bela Vista district, the Beneficência hospitals have approximately 7,500 employees and 3,000 doctors, and treat around 1.9 million patients a year in over 50 medical specialties.

== History ==
The Beneficência Portuguesa was created by Luís Semeão Ferreira Viana and Joaquim Rodrigues Salazar, small Portuguese businessmen, who were joined by Miguel Gonçalves dos Reis. The official establishment of the benevolent organization happened on October 2, 1859, during a meeting at the residence of the Portuguese Aires Coelho da Silva Gameiro, later Baron da Silva Gameiro. Originally, the institution focused on mutual aid between members of the Portuguese community in São Paulo. The 1859 statutes specified that "the Portuguese assembled as members of this Association have as their objective to contribute with financial means and selfless zeal to alleviate the ills that may befall any of the associates."

Silva Gameiro was the first president of the organization, which initially had 118 members. By 1864, there were 290 members and preparations began for the construction of a new headquarters. In 1873, the cornerstone was laid for the São Joaquim Hospital, built on Alegre Street (now Brigadeiro Tobias). It was inaugurated in 1876 and for sixty years it was the Beneficência's only building.

In the 1950s, under the direction of José Ermírio de Moraes, the first building of the new São Joaquim Hospital complex was built on Maestro Cardim Street and inaugurated on June 16, 1957. Between 1971 and 2008, the Beneficência was presided by Antônio Ermírio de Moraes, a member of the Votorantim Group. It is currently run by Rubens Ermírio de Moraes.

== Hospitals ==
Beneficência Portuguesa has three hospitals, two of which are located in the Bela Vista and Paraíso neighborhoods.

- São Joaquim Hospital: has five buildings and a total area of 143,000 m^{2}. It treats 300,000 patients a year, 60% of whom are covered by the Unified Health System (SUS);
- São José Hospital: inaugurated in 2007 and with a total area of 23,000 m^{2}, it was designed to be a reference in oncology, cardiology, orthopedics and neurology;

The Beneficência Portuguesa de São Paulo has a total of 1,080 beds (233 in the ICU), 52 operating rooms, as well as diagnostic and outpatient departments. In 2010, it performed 34,000 surgeries and more than 4 million tests. It is also considered a reference center for transplants. Between 1973 and 2010, 4,050 heart, liver, bone marrow, kidney and lung transplants were carried out.

== Tributes ==
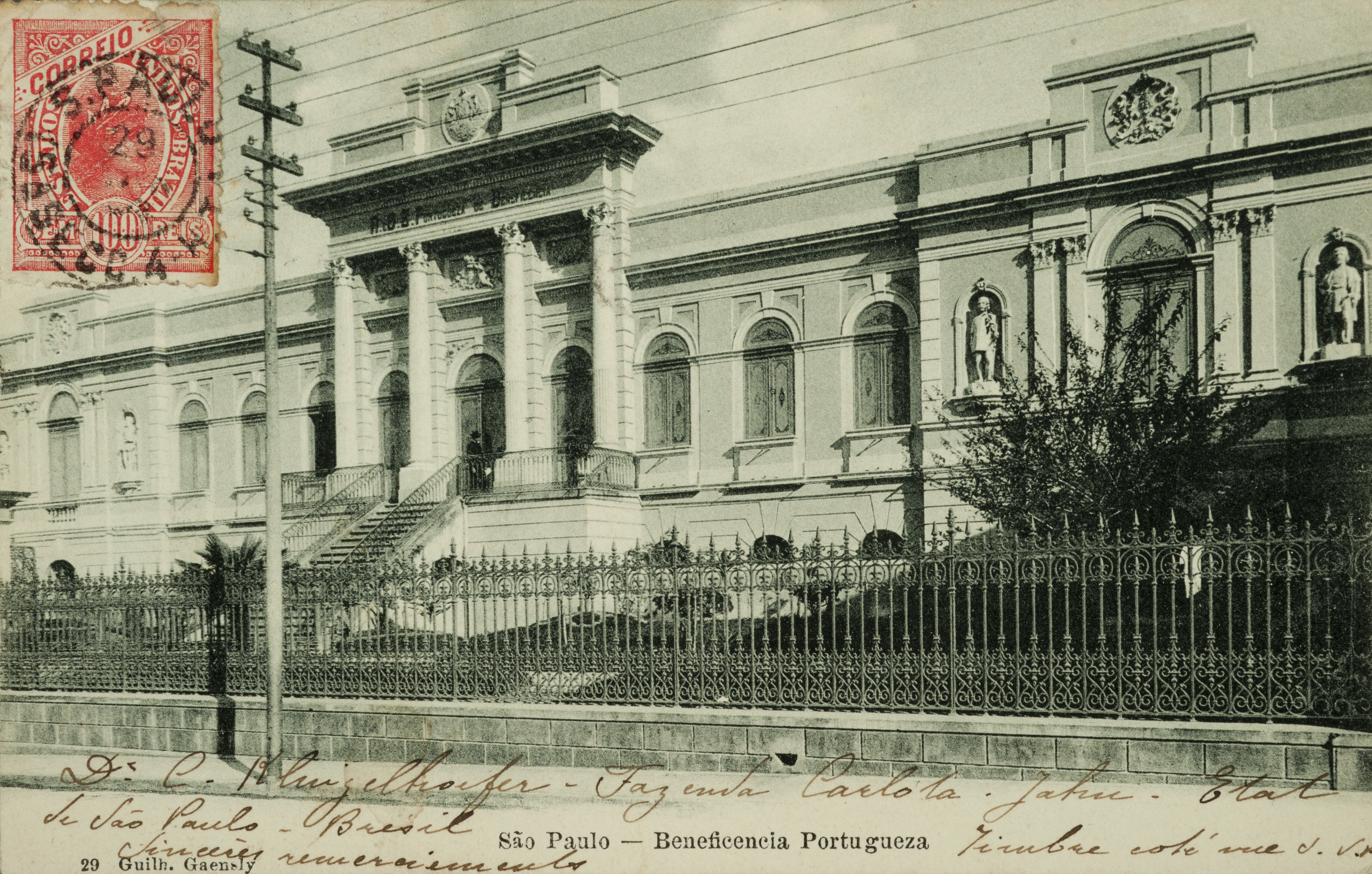
Hospital in photo by Guilherme Gaensly.

The designation "Real e Benemérita" (English: "Royal and Benevolent") was granted by King Carlos I of Portugal on November 22, 1900. On May 1, 1947, the company was made a Commander of the Order of Merit, on September 17, 1954, a Commander of the Military Order of Christ, and on October 12, 1959, it was elevated to the Grand Cross of the Order of Merit of Portugal.

In May 2008, Antônio Ermírio de Moraes, president of Beneficência, received the Oswaldo Cruz Medal of Merit from the President of the Republic, Luiz Inácio Lula da Silva, for the services provided by the institution to the Unified Health System (SUS). In August of the same year, the organization was honored at the 11th CIEE/Gazeta Mercantil Third Sector Seminar for its work in the voluntary sector, with relevant services provided to the needy population.

Its previous name was Real e Benemérita Sociedade Portuguesa de Beneficência, which changed due to the advent of the new Brazilian Civil Code, in force since January 2003, that required charitable organizations to adapt their statutes to the new provisions within a year. At the time, it became necessary to change from a "Sociedade" ("Society") to an "Associação" ("Association") since it was a completely non-profit organization.

== See also ==
- Beneficência Portuguesa de Porto Alegre
