= Metropolitan Cathedral of Our Lady Mother of God, Porto Alegre =

Metropolitan Cathedral of Our Lady Mother of God
- Catedral Metropolitana Nossa Senhora Madre de Deus
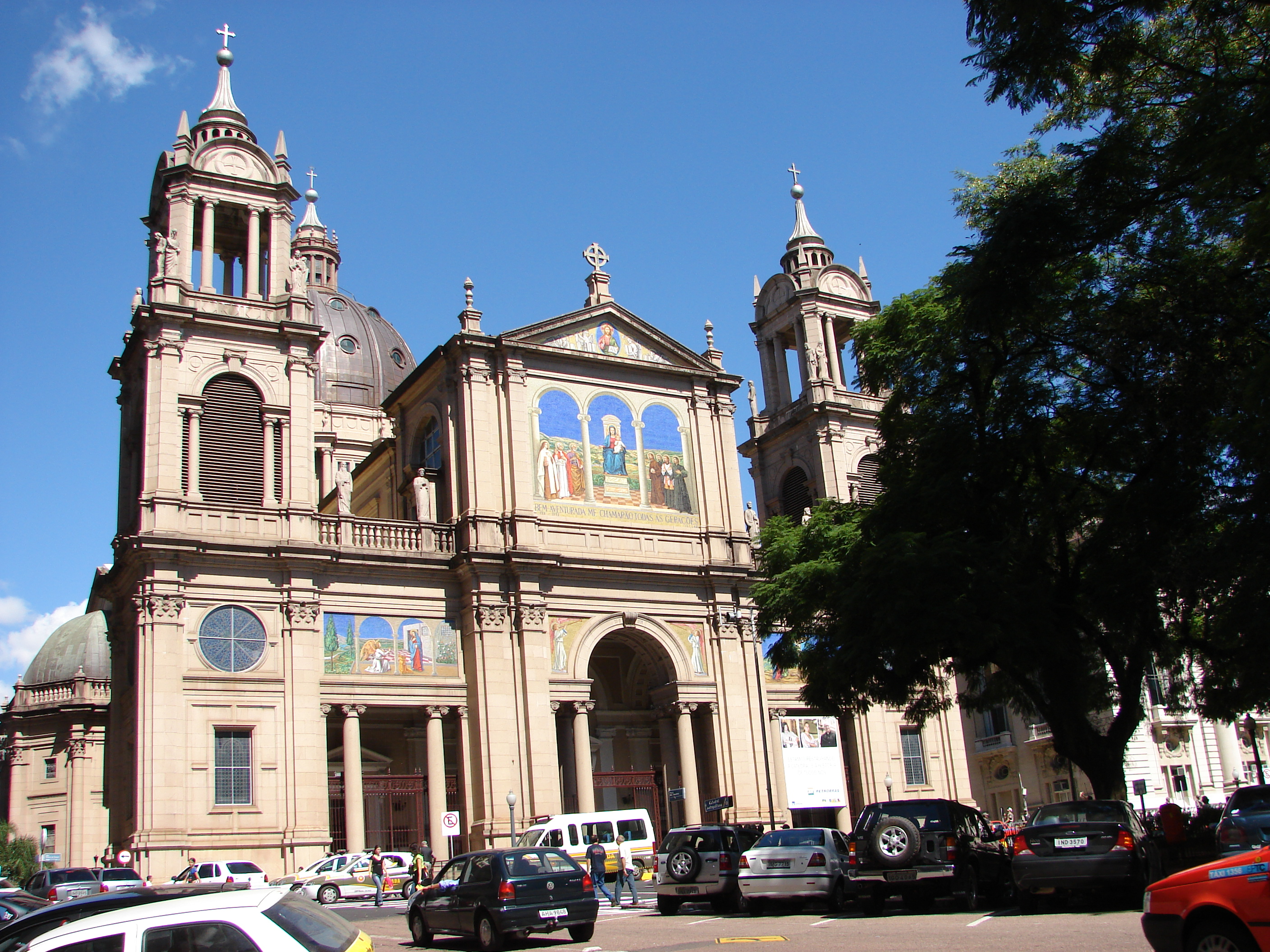
- Metropolitan Cathedral of Our Lady Mother of God
- 30°2′1″S 51°13′48″W
- Location: Porto Alegre, Rio Grande do Sul
- Country: Brazil
- Denomination: Catholic

Administration
- Archdiocese: Archdiocese of Porto Alegre

The Metropolitan Cathedral of Our Lady Mother of God (Portuguese: Catedral Metropolitana Nossa Senhora Madre de Deus), also called the Metropolitan Cathedral of Porto Alegre (Catedral Metropolitana de Porto Alegre), is the Catholic metropolitan cathedral of Porto Alegre and the seat of the eponymous archdiocese.

The founding of the church is closely related to the origin of the city. With the transfer of the state capital of Viamão to Porto dos Casais, it became clear the need to build a new church, with dimensions corresponding to the new status of the city. On July 12, 1772, the viceroy ordered that land for the construction demarcate.

This Baroque style cathedral was designed by an unknown architect and has two bell towers flanking the main entrance. These towers were brought from Rio de Janeiro in 1774.

The current cathedral was built in 1921–1972.

== See also ==
- Roman Catholic Archdiocese of Porto Alegre
- Roman Catholicism in Brazil
- Metropolitan cathedral (disambiguation)
- Church of Our Lady of the Conception
- Mother Church of the Immaculate Conception (Viamão)
