= Dom Sebastião Square =

Brazilian square

Coordinates: 30°01′48″S 51°13′08″W

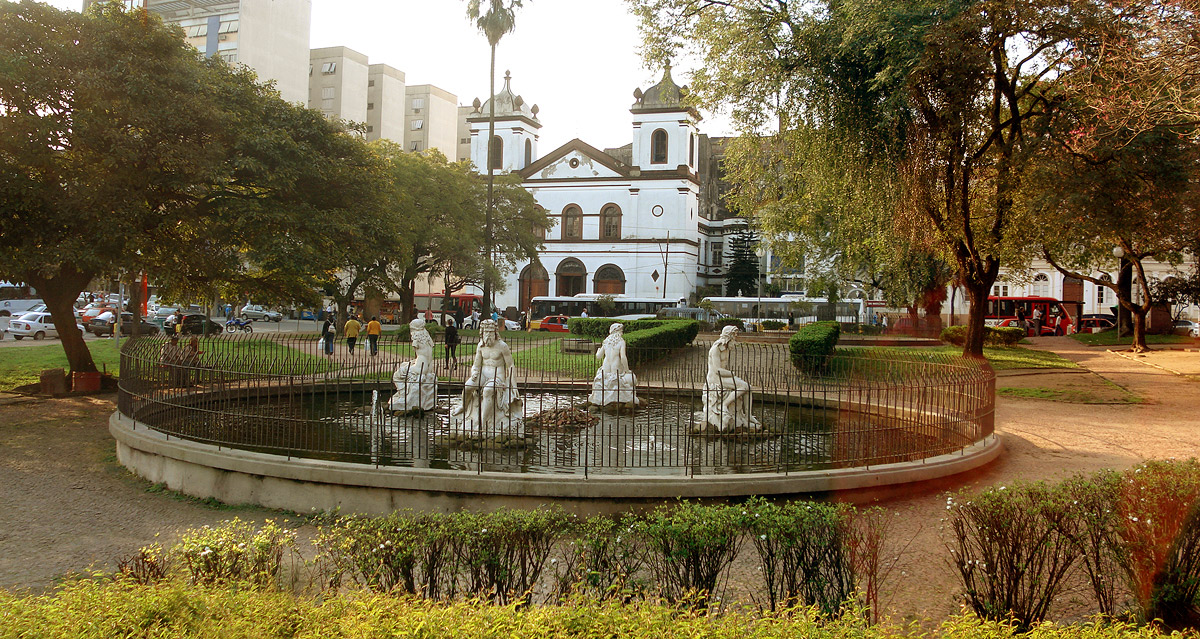
View of the square in 2007, with the Church of the Conception in the background

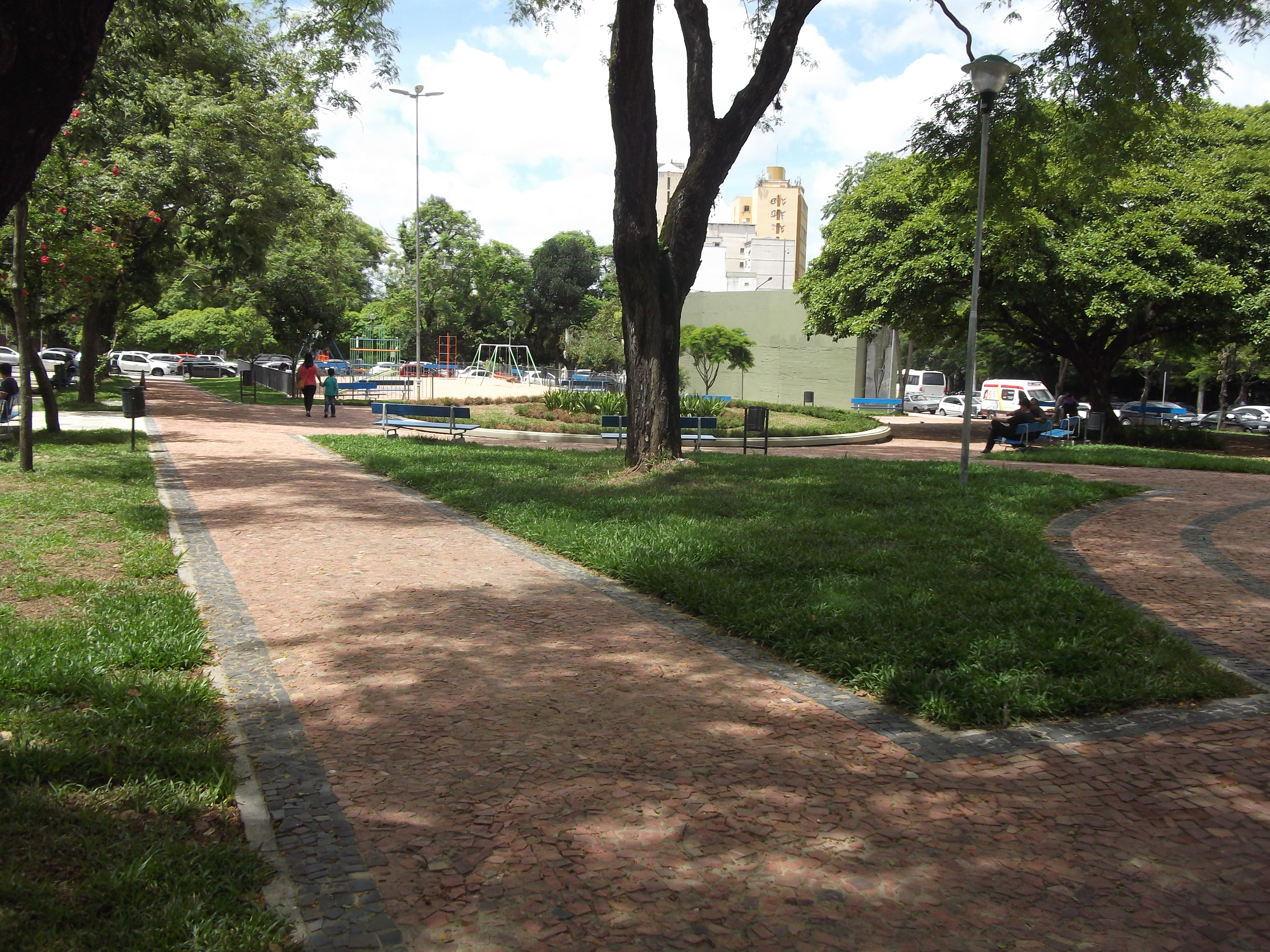
View of the square in 2014

Dom Sebastião Square is located in the Brazilian city of Porto Alegre, capital of the state of Rio Grande do Sul. It is bordered on the north by Independência Avenue, on the east by Dom Sebastião Lane, on the south by Irmão José Otão Street and on the west by Sarmento Leite Street. It was named after the diocesan bishop Dom Sebastião Dias Laranjeira.

The first mention of the site can be found in an 1847 request from the Brotherhood of Our Lady of the Conception, asking to fix the alignment of its future church and, at the same time, demanding that the square between the streets of Barbosa (now Barros Cassal Street) and Brigadeira (now Conceição Street) be demarcated.

On September 25, 1848, the councillors authorized the exchange of land between the City Hall and the Santa Casa, with the latter transferring part of the area, and another portion being expropriated from Lieutenant Colonel Antônio Joaquim da Silva Mariante and Manoel Joaquim da Silva.

With the construction of the Church of Our Lady of the Conception in 1851, the area became known as Conceição Square, a name officially recognized on 20 October 1857. In 1863, Antônio Mariante volunteered to plant pine trees in the square and, on October 28, 1884, it was renamed to its current name.

In 1889, the square was leveled and landscaped and, in 1904, it received the railing that belonged to the Marechal Deodoro and XV de Novembro squares. In 1920, the old pine trees, which had already grown excessively, were cut down. In 1925, the railings were removed and, in 1935, the square was completely remodeled, gardened in a geometric pattern, and given a light fountain and artificial waterfalls.

There, the four remaining Carrara marble statues of the five that, between 1866 and 1907, adorned the Emperor's Fountain in the center of the Marechal Deodoro Square, were installed. They personified the great rivers of the Guaíba basin: Cahy, Gravatahy, Sinos and Jacuhy, according to the old spelling. This fountain was the first commemorative monument to be installed outdoors in the state, set up with a celebratory design by the architect José Obino.

In 1972, the Conceição Tunnel vent was built on the corner of Sarmento Leite and Irmão José Otão streets, and consisted of a large concrete block where three cut iron panels with a regionalist theme by the sculptor Francisco Stockinger were placed. In the 1990s, the cascades were removed and landfilled, and the statues were reinstalled in a new luminous fountain created in the center of the square. All the statues of the group were repeatedly depredated and, in 2014, they were removed from the space and installed in the Moinhos de Vento Hydraulic Plant.

Some important historical buildings of Porto Alegre are located in its surroundings, such as the Church of Our Lady of the Conception, the Beneficência Portuguesa and the Colégio Nossa Senhora do Rosário. Next to Colégio Rosário, there is a hot dog stand known as Cachorro-quente do Rosário, which has become famous in the city. In 2006, the square was adopted by the school, which ensures its maintenance and cleanliness.

== See also ==
- Architecture of Porto Alegre
- History of Porto Alegre
