= Beneficência Portuguesa de Porto Alegre =

Brazilian hospital

Coordinates: 30°01′45″S 51°13′08″W

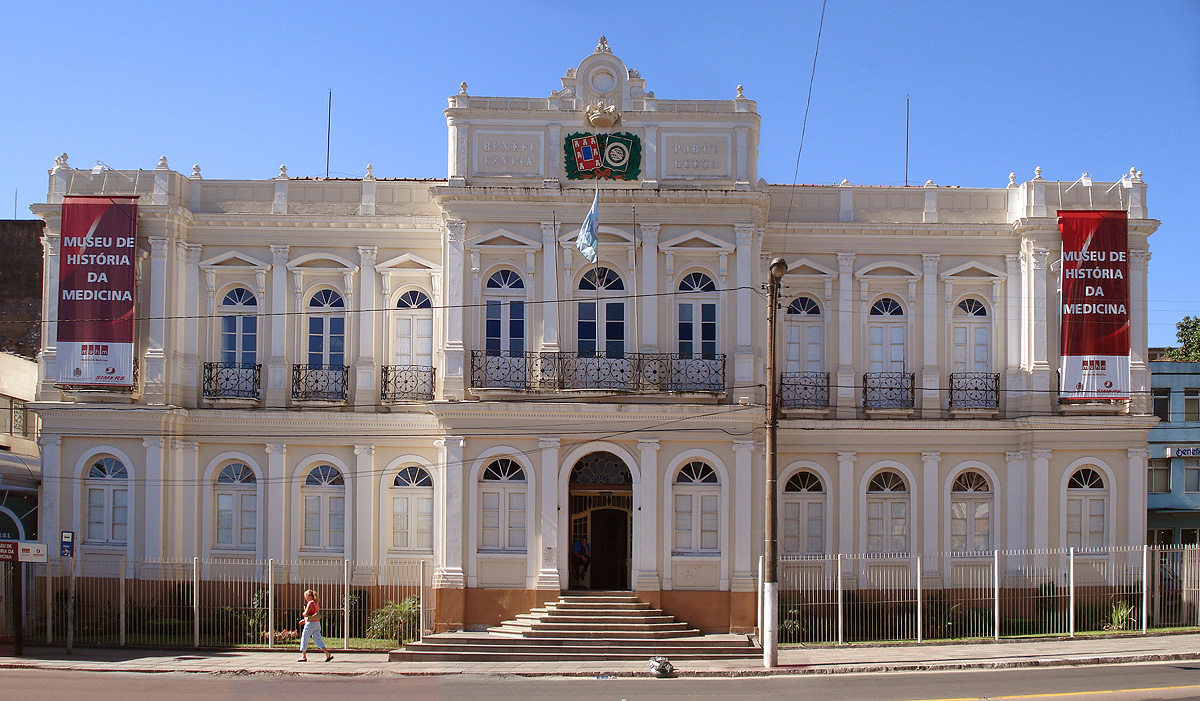
The historical building of the Beneficência Portuguesa.

The Beneficência Portuguesa de Porto Alegre, originally Sociedade Beneficente e Hospitalar da Colônia Portuguesa de Porto Alegre (English: Hospital and Charitable Society of the Portuguese Colony of Porto Alegre), is a Brazilian philanthropic hospital institution in the city of Porto Alegre, state of Rio Grande do Sul.

It is located at 270 Independência Avenue, in the Independência neighborhood. In 1977, the historical building was included by the City Hall in the Inventory of Real Estate Assets of Historical and Cultural Value and of Expressive Tradition.

== History ==
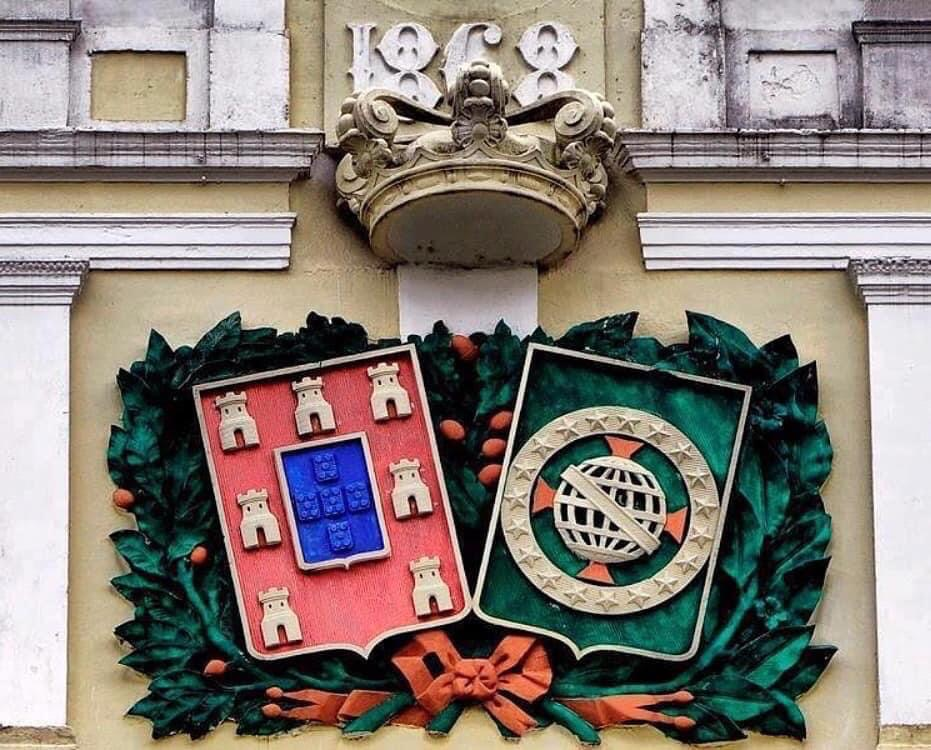
Portuguese Royal Coat of Arms (left) and Brazilian Imperial Coat of Arms (right) united under a royal crown, at the facade of the Beneficência Portuguesa de Porto Alegre.

After Brazil's independence in 1822, the Portuguese who lived in the country were prevented from creating new Santas Casas, and as a way to keep the Portuguese presence in these lands, they took the initiative to create hospitals wherever there was a community of their friends or descendants. The idea of founding a Portuguese philanthropic entity in Porto Alegre dates back to 1845, when the acting Vice President of the Province, Major Patrício José Correia da Câmara, became aware of the project and showed his goodwill by supporting the cause. However, the recently ended Farroupilha Revolution had harassed the largely Portuguese Restoration Party, and the project, shrouded in suspicion and political hesitation, was temporarily abandoned.

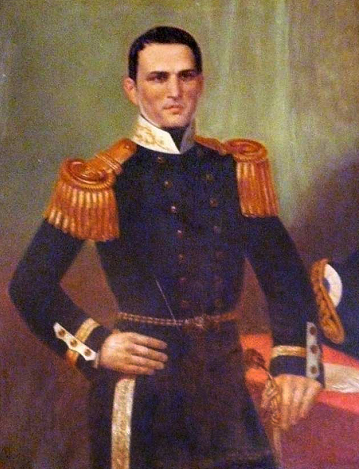
Antônio Maria do Amaral Ribeiro, first president of the Beneficência Portuguesa.

In 1854, once the Lusitanians and Brazilians had been reconciled in Rio Grande do Sul, the news of the death of the Queen of Portugal D. Maria II, sister of the Emperor of Brazil at the time, D. Pedro II, was received, leading to an intense commotion in the city, with several solemnities being organized to honor and mourn the deceased sovereign. In this emotive atmosphere, the press began to instigate the Portuguese community to create its own assistantialist entity, as existed in other cities. Therefore, on February 26, some Portuguese citizens, led by the honorary vice-consul of Portugal, Antônio Maria do Amaral Ribeiro, gathered in a room of the Santa Casa de Misericórdia Hospital, and there founded the Sociedade Beneficente (English: Beneficent Society), placed under the protection of King Fernando II of Portugal. In his speech, Ribeiro emphasized the patriotic aspect of the initiative, and that, due to the lack of attention from the Brazilian authorities to the Portuguese community, it would be better if the Portuguese themselves took responsibility for their medical and social care.

The first board of the institution was composed of Antônio do Amaral Ribeiro, president; Joaquim Caetano Pinto, secretary; Francisco José Belo, treasurer; Antônio Ribeiro da Silva and Faustino de Oliveira Guimarães, substitutes; Antônio Santos Paranhos, Joaquim Porto Maia, Jerônimo Veloso Pacheco, Antônio Félix de Bittencourt, Manoel Ferreira Guimarães, Domingos Ribeiro Álvares and José Antônio Barreiros, counselors.

In the beginning, the Society did not have its own headquarters, which led to the establishment of a contract with the Santa Casa for the care of its patients, whose numbers kept growing. At the end of the first year of existence, there were already 557 people associated, with a fund of 5:920$680 réis. On May 28, 1856, with Domingos José Lopes as president, a house was bought at the old Figueira Street, now known as Coronel Genuíno Street, and the first Portuguese patient was admitted there on February 2, 1859.

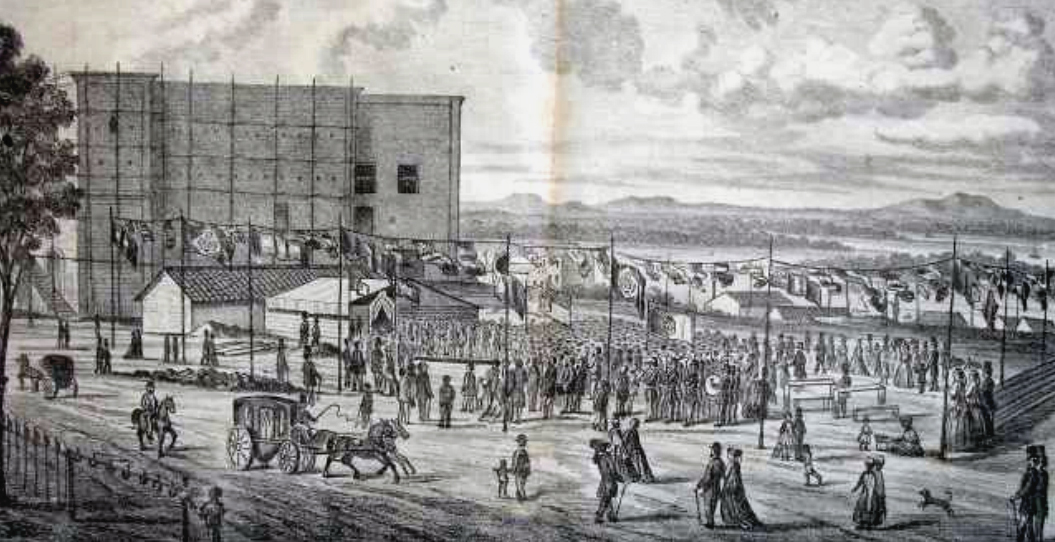
Ceremony to lay the cornerstone of the new building, 1867.

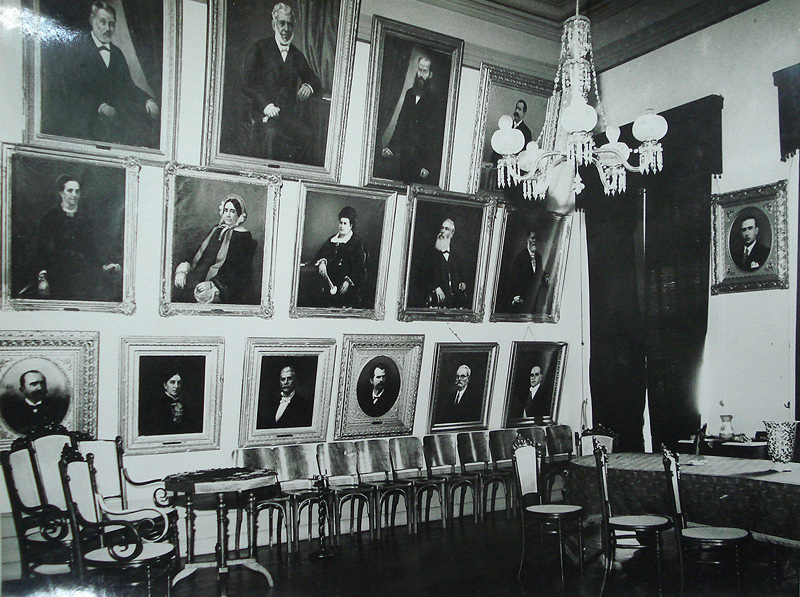
Old Noble Hall in the historical building, with pictures of meritorious members.

In 1863, the house was remodeled and two adjacent buildings were purchased, but progressively the need to expand the service space became apparent. The desire for a larger headquarters emerged with the cholera outbreak in the city in 1867, when several patients were treated in the original small ambulatory. Dr. Dionísio de Oliveira Silveiro and his wife, D. Maria Sofia da Silva Freire donated a piece of land on the old Caminho da Aldeia, the current Independência Avenue, making it possible to build the new headquarters. Engineer Frederico Heydtmann was in charge of the floor plans for the new hospital, with Antônio Francisco Pereira dos Santos as master builder. The facade design was the responsibility of Inácio Weingärtner.

The cornerstone of the new building was laid on June 29, 1867, and thanks to several donations, auctions, recitals, and other fund-raising events, it was inaugurated on June 29, 1870, amidst great celebrations. In early 1871 the first chapel was completed, inside the building, and its first chaplain, Father Joaquim Cirilo da Cunha, was appointed on February 12. On June 29, 1872, the patron saint, Saint Peter, whose image was donated by José Fernandes Granja, was enthroned.

The historical building consists of two floors, in a symmetrical arrangement, with a projecting central body and side wings with two blocks at the ends that also project forward. The facade, in eclectic style with a predominance of neoclassical elements, stands on a small embasement, and a staircase in royal stone leads to the entrance door. The openings are all round arched, separated by Ionic pilasters on the second floor and Corinthian on the second, where there are balconies with wrought iron railings, and an upper finish in an edicule. The building is crowned by a platband with a pediment aligned at the entrance, where a relief shows the coat of arms of the Kingdom of Portugal and the Empire of Brazil, topped by a royal crown, plus the name of the institution - BENEFICENCIA PORTUGUEZA - and the date 1868. Inside, the richly carved staircases and the Noble Hall stand out, with embossed decoration, stained glass windows and a collection of portraits of benefactors.

After moving to its new headquarters, the Beneficência Portuguesa never stopped expanding its presence in the society of Rio Grande do Sul. In 1884, it participated in the local movement for the emancipation of slaves, donating many letters of emancipation. The number of attendances, members, and the volume of its assets, increased by donations in the form of real estate, inheritances, special lotteries, and other sources, has grown. In 1892, improvements were made in the facilities, with consulting rooms being created on the first floor, as well as a pharmacy; on the upper floor, the Noble Hall was remodeled to make space for new rooms. In 1894, the operating room was completely equipped, with supplies ordered in Portugal at a cost of 2:500$000 réis.

=== 20th century ===
In 1900, the Society had assets valued at 397:080$940 réis, and no debts. In 1902, an infirmary for contagious diseases and a disinfection oven were created. In 1907, a plot of land was acquired to create a cemetery for members, next to St. Michael and Souls Cemetery, which was consecrated on October 24, 1909. In the same year, the operating rooms, the water and gas pipes were renovated, and the laundry was installed. In 1911, the women's infirmary was created and electric light was installed. In 1915, a separate chapel was erected on the side lot, being consecrated on February 13, 1916, by Dom João Becker, which was moved to the back of the hospital in 1929.

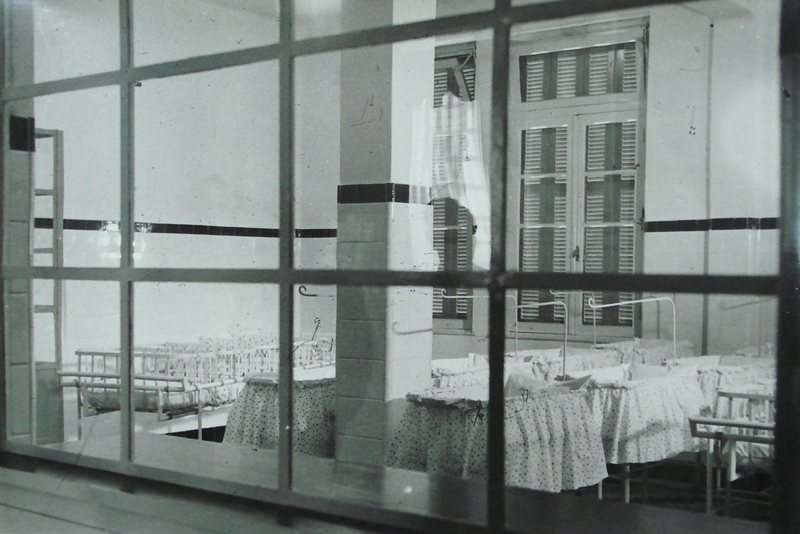
Former maternity ward.

On September 1, 1923, the internal administration of the hospital was handed over to the Sisters of Divine Providence, recognized for their efficiency, under the direction of Mother Egbertina, inaugurating a new phase in the functioning of the entity. In 1928, a new wing was inaugurated, built on land acquired in 1925, at the back of the hospital; the Radiology Office, the Diathermy Office, a consulting room and two new operating rooms were installed there. In 1936, another branch was opened, on Conceição Street, where the maternity ward was established. In 1937, an extensive area of land in Gravataí was acquired, with 130 hectares of bush, pasture, and water, in order to set up a farm that could generate additional funds, and to create the Retiro da Velhice (English: Retirement Home). In 1950, a new block was created with 71 apartments and twelve rooms, a modern maternity ward, consulting rooms, new operating rooms, and a large kitchen.

In 1951, the Beneficência Portuguesa participated as an invited guest in the IV South American Congress of Neurosurgery, which was a milestone in the medical and scientific life of the city; from then on, its services in the neurological area became recognized all over Brazil and even abroad. In the same year the institution also received a first place diploma in public preference, and the Neurosurgical Clinic was created. The following year, new land was acquired and the Radiotherapy Institute was built and inaugurated.

Since then, the complex has become one of the most important hospitals in the city, and in the 1950s it was the most sought-after maternity hospital in Porto Alegre. Later, it expanded its scope and deepened in the specialties of Neurology and Neurosurgery, attending a significant portion of the population. It also started to receive patients referred from Conceição and Clínicas hospitals, relieving the burden on these health centers. In 1996, its statutes were reformulated so that the institution would be adapted to the Unified Health System (SUS), entering the category of philanthropic hospital and being able to act with greater resourcefulness.

Its historical archive has a significant document collection, containing patient records, accounting books, records of purchases of materials, payments, donations, membership lists, diplomas, medical and cemetery records, architectural plans, asset inventories, correspondence, official minutes, newspapers, many printed materials, and others. An important collection of painted portraits of its benefactors is kept in its Noble Hall.

== Crisis ==
At the end of the 1990s, an administrative and financial crisis began to get out of control, with the usual gap between expenses and revenues experienced by the health area in Brazil, leading to a situation that would bring the traditional institution to the brink of collapse. Several partnerships were established for a more efficient management and new projects were launched, such as the installation of a Clinical Center with 85 rooms, the Traumatology and Orthopedics ambulatory, and the Pacemaker Center.

At the beginning of the 21st century, its situation worsened, but despite the difficulties, in 2003 the hospital ranked second in good attendance in Rio Grande do Sul. However, in 2007, it had its execution decreed by the Instituto Nacional do Seguro Social (INSS), and its building had to be auctioned, but the process was judicially reverted. Its condition was fragile, with a debt of about 18 million reais, besides having suffered for a long time with the lack of transference of the state funds to which it was entitled, due to the low amount reimbursed by the health insurances. In 2017, with several months of unpaid wages, part of the employees paralyzed their activities. In the same year, for not meeting the goals agreed upon, the City Hall terminated its contract with the institution, which was threatened to close its doors.

In 2018, it began to be managed by the Saint Michael Charitable Association, which took on the responsibility of settling debts valued at R$100 million. The Charitable Association was accused of producing more debt, not fulfilling the terms of the contract, and leaving the surgical block, the ICU rooms, the pharmacy, and the kitchen in no state to function. Salaries were delayed again. The situation ended up being taken to court and generated a public controversy.

Despite this, several new projects were launched. In 2021, the hospital inaugurated the B Admission Unit with 32 beds, and a high complexity center with three operating rooms and nine recovery beds was planned. In an article published in June referring to the opening ceremony, the City Hall stated that the institution "is part of the history of health services in the city" and has been "an important partner of the Porto Alegre City Hall in providing SUS services in the capital". The reopening of the chapel was also announced, and the Brilha Beneficência project was launched, providing for the restoration and lighting of the historic facade, the internal courtyards, and the fountain. In the same year, the City Council honored the centennial institution.

Despite the recovery attempts, in 2022 a court order announced the sale of the hospital to cover a labor debt of 35 million reais. The value of the buildings was budgeted at 49.1 million, but the forced liquidation lowered them to 34.1 million. The Charitable Association appealed the decision. Faced with the prospect of losing more than 200 beds to the city's health system, which is in crisis, the Medical Union of Rio Grande do Sul has launched a campaign to save the institution.

== Structure and services ==
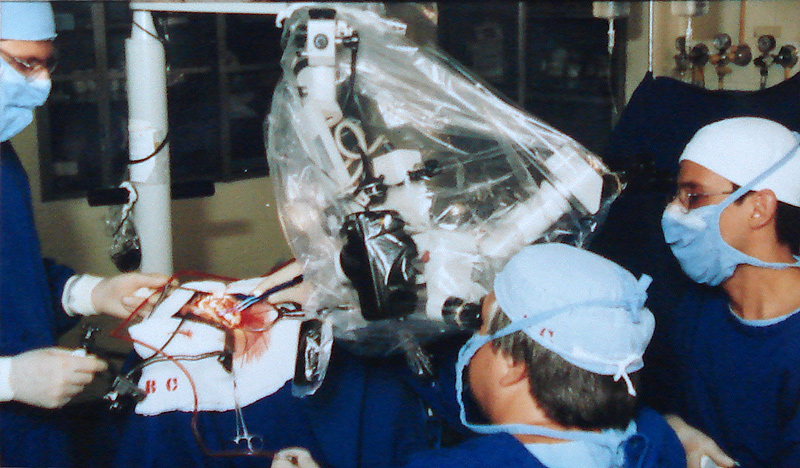
Neurosurgery team in action.

The society is a philanthropic, non-profit institution that is organized through a general assembly, which is supreme, a deliberative council, a audit committee, and a board of directors, in addition to a body of associates that numbers around three thousand contributors.

According to 2004 data, the Beneficência Hospital staff is formed by about one hundred doctors and 320 employees, among nurses, attendants, and administrators, and has about 150 beds for hospitalization. Approximately 70% of the procedures are performed in partnership with SUS and the Institute of Social Security of the State of Rio Grande do Sul (IPE).

=== Specialties ===
Among all the medical areas, the Beneficência Portuguesa is nationally recognized for the excellence of its services, especially in neurology and neurosurgery. Its specialties are:

- Cardiology
- Colorectal surgery
- Gastroenterology
- General practice and internal medicine
- General surgery
- Gynecology
- Hemotherapy
- Neurology
- Nephrology
- Neuroradiology
- Oncology
- Otorhinolaryngology
- Plastic surgery
- Physiatry
- Physical therapy
- Psychology
- Pulmonology
- Speech therapy
- Traumatology
- Urology
- Video surgery

=== Surgical clinics ===
- General surgery
- Head and neck surgery
- Neurosurgery
- Plastic surgery
- Traumatology and orthopedics
- Urological surgery
- Vascular surgery
- Video surgery

=== Diagnostic services ===
- Bone densitometry
- Clinical analysis laboratory
- Computed and helical tomography
- Digestive and respiratory endoscopy
- Digital and interventional angiography
- Doppler ultrasound
- Electrocardiography
- Electroencephalography
- Magnetic resonance imaging
- Mammography
- In vivo nuclear medicine
- Pathological anatomy and cytopathology
- Radiology
- Ultrasound

== Museum of the History of Medicine ==
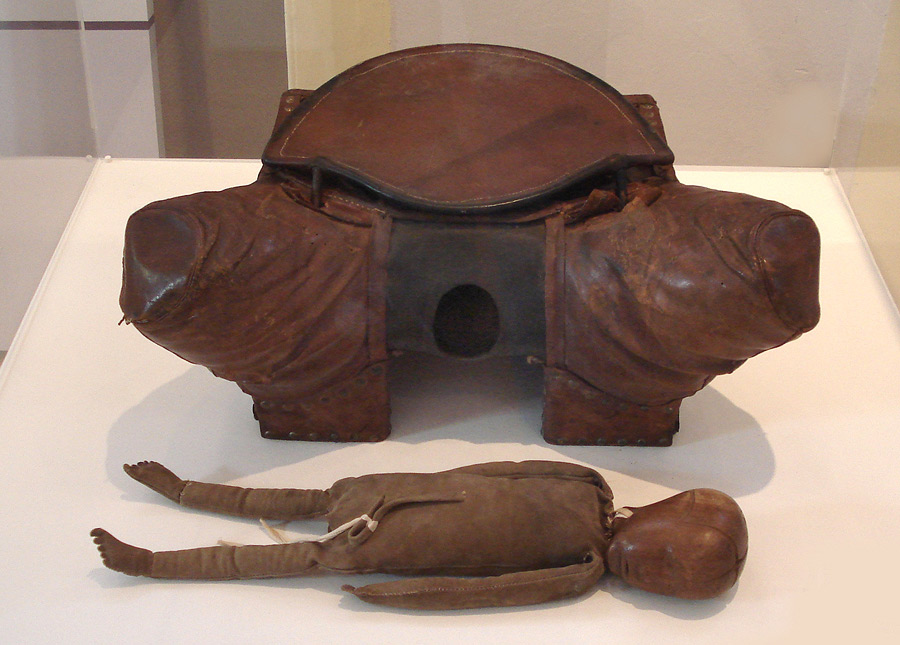
Model of pelvis and puppet used by Dr. Gabriel Schlatter in the beginning of XX century to teach technical procedures for a successful childbirth. Museum of the History of Medicine, Porto Alegre, Brasil.

Currently, the historical building houses the Museum of the History of Medicine of Rio Grande do Sul, created in October 2006 by the Medical Union of Rio Grande do Sul, with a collection that includes thousands of pieces, including surgical tools from the 19th century, old medicine bottles and boxes, and handmade microscopes, in addition to a bibliographic collection of more than four thousand titles, including the Archivos Rio-Grandenses de Medicina (a renowned medical journal from the first half of the 20th century), and old theses from students at the UFRGS School of Medicine.

During the process of installing the museum, it was found that the documentary collection of the Beneficência was badly stored and in poor conservation conditions. An agreement was then concluded between the museum, Unisinos and the Historical Archives of Rio Grande do Sul to recover this valuable material, carrying out sanitization, transcription of documents, organization of the collection, and creation of a catalog.

== See also ==
- History of Porto Alegre
- Beneficência Portuguesa de São Paulo
