= Himeria =

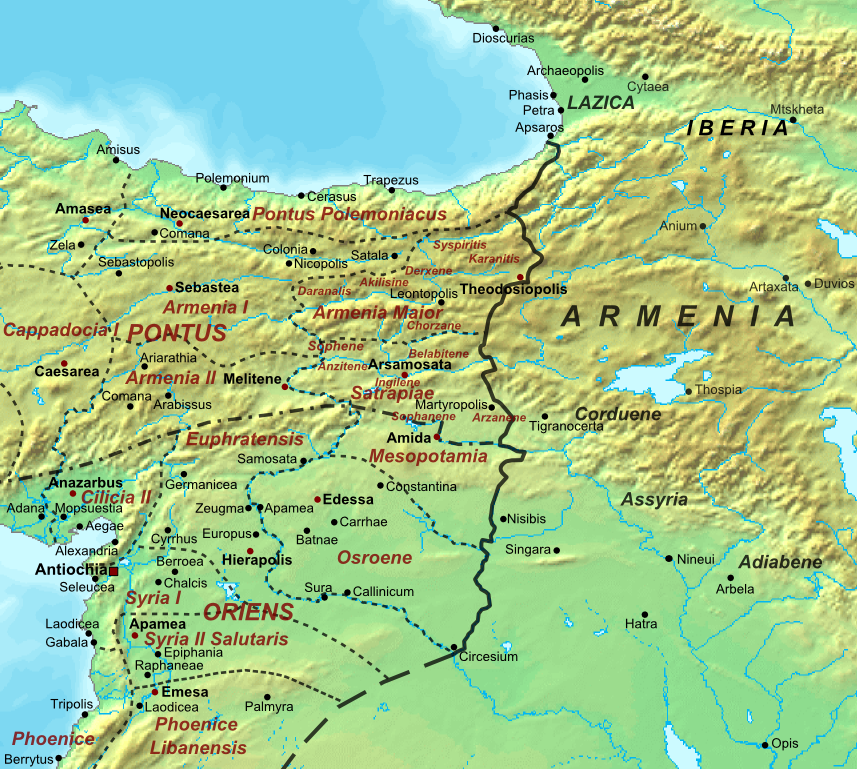
Map of the Roman/Persian border area, 5th century AD; Himeria was located near to Europos in the province of Osroene.

Himeria (Greek: Ἱμέρια) was a city and bishopric in the Roman province of Osrhoene, whose metropolitan see was Edessa.

== History ==
The city, which was destroyed, has not been rediscovered; but it is thought to have been located near the Euphrates and Europos or Carchemish (Djerabis).

The 6th-century "Notitia" of Anastasius still mentions this episcopal see as being in that province and in the Patriarchate of Antioch ("Échos d'Orient", Paris, 1907, 145). Procopius ("De aedificiis", II, 9) says that Byzantine Emperor Justinian I rebuilt its walls.

At least seven bishops are known from the 4th to the 6th century, the first of whom, Eustathius, was in correspondence with Saint Basil (Lequien, Oriens christianus II, 983-86).
