= Nostra Signora de La Salette =

- Church of Our Lady of La Salette (in English); Domini Nostræ a La Salette in Monte Viridi (in Latin)
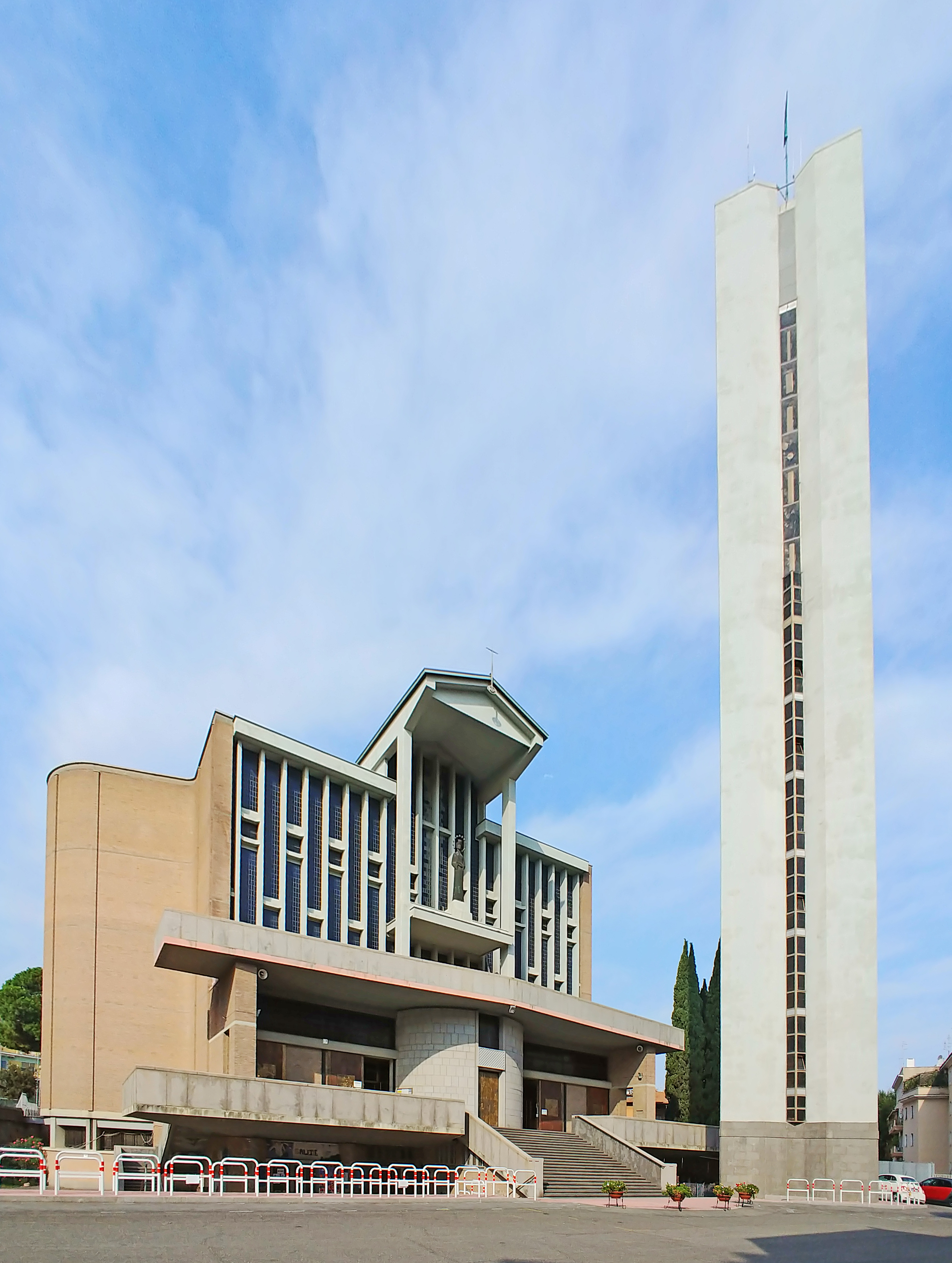
- Facade
- Click on the map for a fullscreen view
- 41°52′33″N 12°26′56″E
- Location: Via Fabiola 10, Rome
- Country: Italy
- Denomination: Roman Catholic
- Tradition: Roman Rite
- Website: lasaletteroma.it

History
- Status: Titular church
- Dedication: Our Lady of La Salette
- Consecrated: 1965

Architecture
- Architect(s): Vivina Rizzi; Ennio Canino
- Architectural type: Church
- Style: Modernist
- Groundbreaking: 1957
- Completed: 1965

Administration
- Province: Rome

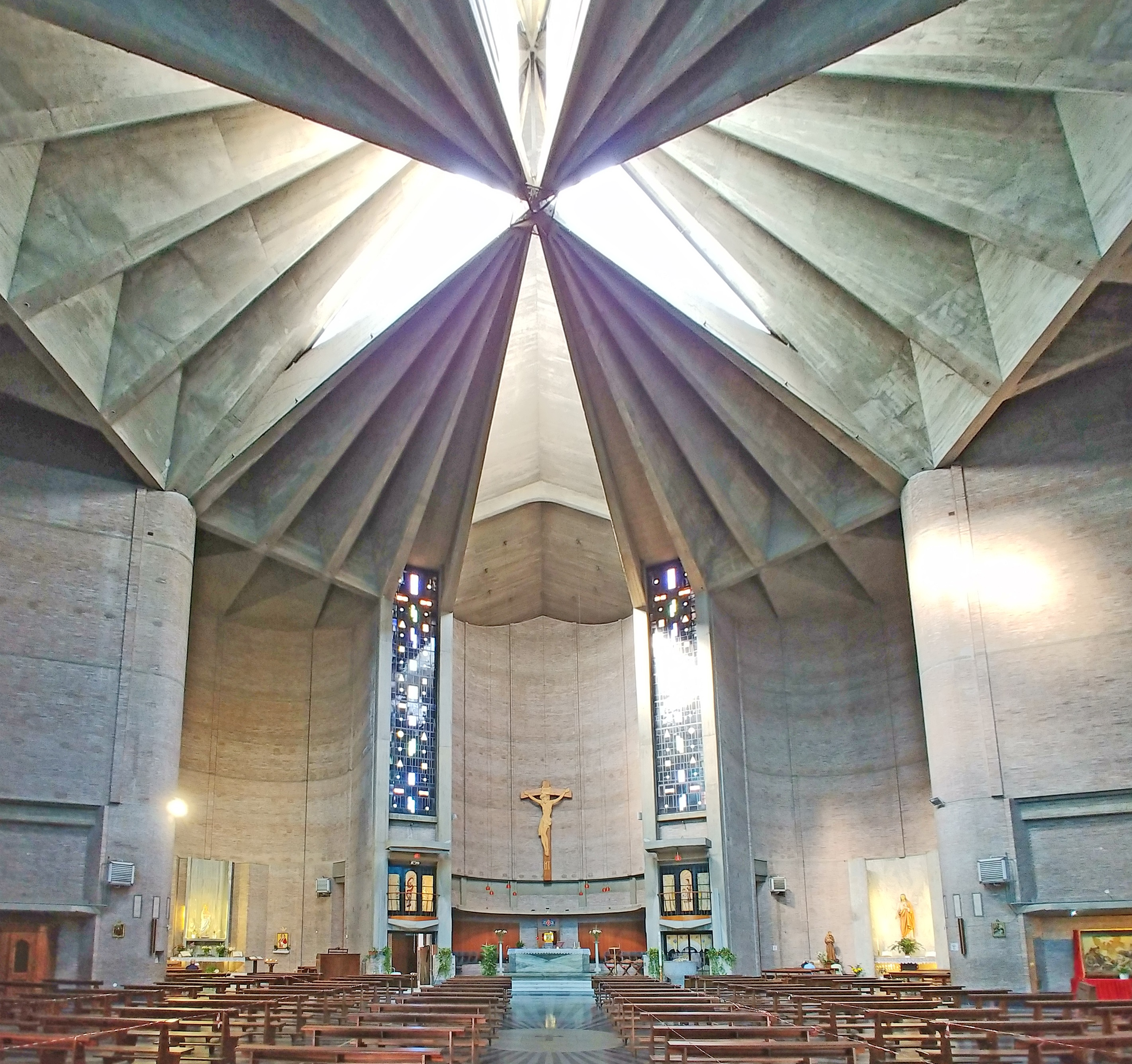
Interior

Nostra Signora de La Salette is a church in Rome, in the Gianicolense district, in the square Our Lady of La Salette.

== History ==
It was built between 1957 and 1965 to a design by architects Vivina Rizzi and Ennio Canino and dedicated to Our Lady of La Salette. The church is home parish, established on 18 June 1957 with the decree of the Cardinal Vicar Clemente Micara "Neminem quidem fugit", and entrusted to the Missionaries of Our Lady of La Salette, who are its owners. It is also home to the "cardinal's title Our Lady of La Salette", founded by Pope Paul VI on 29 April 1969.

== Description ==
The exterior is preceded by a wide staircase that leads to the temple. The facade is divided into two terraces: the first has set the entry; the second is characterized by tall windows that form the backdrop to the titular statue of the Madonna, which appeared in 1846 in La Salette in France, which juts out like a high canopy of reinforced concrete. The church is flanked by a bell tower, among the highest of Rome (the Quercioli the extent to 52 meters). The interior has a central plan with brick walls that converge sinuously to the only altar. According to the Quercioli "Our Lady of La Salette by many is considered a sacred architecture cornerstone of our days. » (Quercioli M., op.cit. P.375)

== Cardinal Priest ==
Pope Paul VI established it as a titular church on 30 April 1969.

- Alfredo Scherer, 30 April 1969 appointed – 9 March 1996 died
- Polycarp Pengo, 21 February 1998 appointed – 19 February 2026 died
