= Church of Our Lady of the Conception (Porto Alegre) =

Catholic Church in Brazil

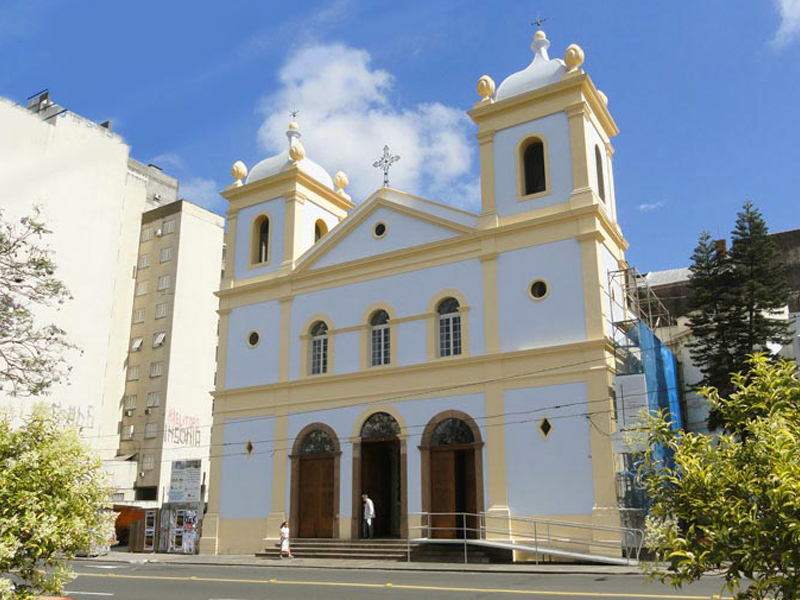

- Location of the Church

Religion
- Affiliation: Catholic
- Ownership: Roman Catholic Archdiocese of Porto Alegre

Location
- Location: Porto Alegre, Rio Grande do Sul, Brazil
- Coordinates: 30°01′45″S 51°13′09″W

Architecture
- Completed: 1890

The Church of Our Lady of the Conception is a temple of the Catholic Church located on Independência Avenue, in front of the Dom Sebastião Square, in Porto Alegre, Brazil. It is one of the oldest churches in the city and the one that best preserves its original appearance, containing a rich internal decoration in gilded woodcarving and statuary, besides being a listed property by the City Hall.

== History ==
The devotion to Our Lady of the Conception in Brazil goes back to the period of the reestablishment of the Portuguese sovereignty in Portugal, when in 1646 João IV, with the help of fidalgos, took over the power and ended the Spanish domination, attributing the success of the event to the intercession of Our Lady of the Conception. In gratitude, the new monarch declared her Queen and Patroness of Portugal, and determined that the Virgin under this denomination should be worshipped in temples or chapels in all the cities and towns of the Metropolis and its colonies, including Brazil. In Rio Grande do Sul, the first church dedicated to Our Lady of the Conception was built in Viamão in 1741. Later, with the proclamation of the dogma of the Immaculate Conception by Pope Pius IX, in 1854, Marian devotion was strengthened.

In Porto Alegre, the Our Lady of the Conception Brotherhood has been present since the city's origins, being one of the oldest, founded in 1790 near the old Mother Church, and formed by whites and mulattos. Among its first members were Cláudio do Ribeiro de Avelar, Alberto Francisco dos Santos, and marshals Ferreira do Nascimento and Alves de Souza, and others, who elected Brigadier Rafael Pinto Bandeira as their protector. In 1792, the Brotherhood signed a commitment with the government of Lisbon and installed an altar dedicated to Mary in the Mother Church. However, after disagreements about the place where a proper temple for Our Lady should be built, Rafaela Pinto Bandeira, the protector's daughter, donated, in 1847, a piece of land on Estrada de Cima, now Independência Avenue, to build the church. The City Council established the alignment of the site on October 23, 1847, and the donation was formalized on August 8, 1851. A clause in the donation stated that the church should be built within eight years, or else the land would be returned to the donor's possessions, which hastened the laying of the cornerstone, but the building would in fact take much longer to complete.

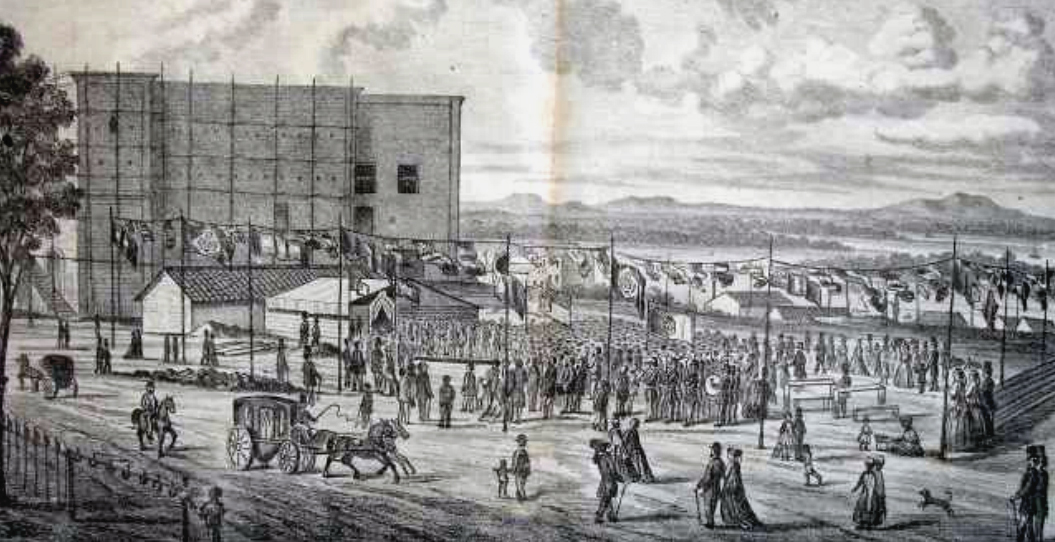
Ceremony to lay the cornerstone of the Beneficência Portuguesa in 1867. The large block on the left is the still incomplete structure of the Church of the Conception.

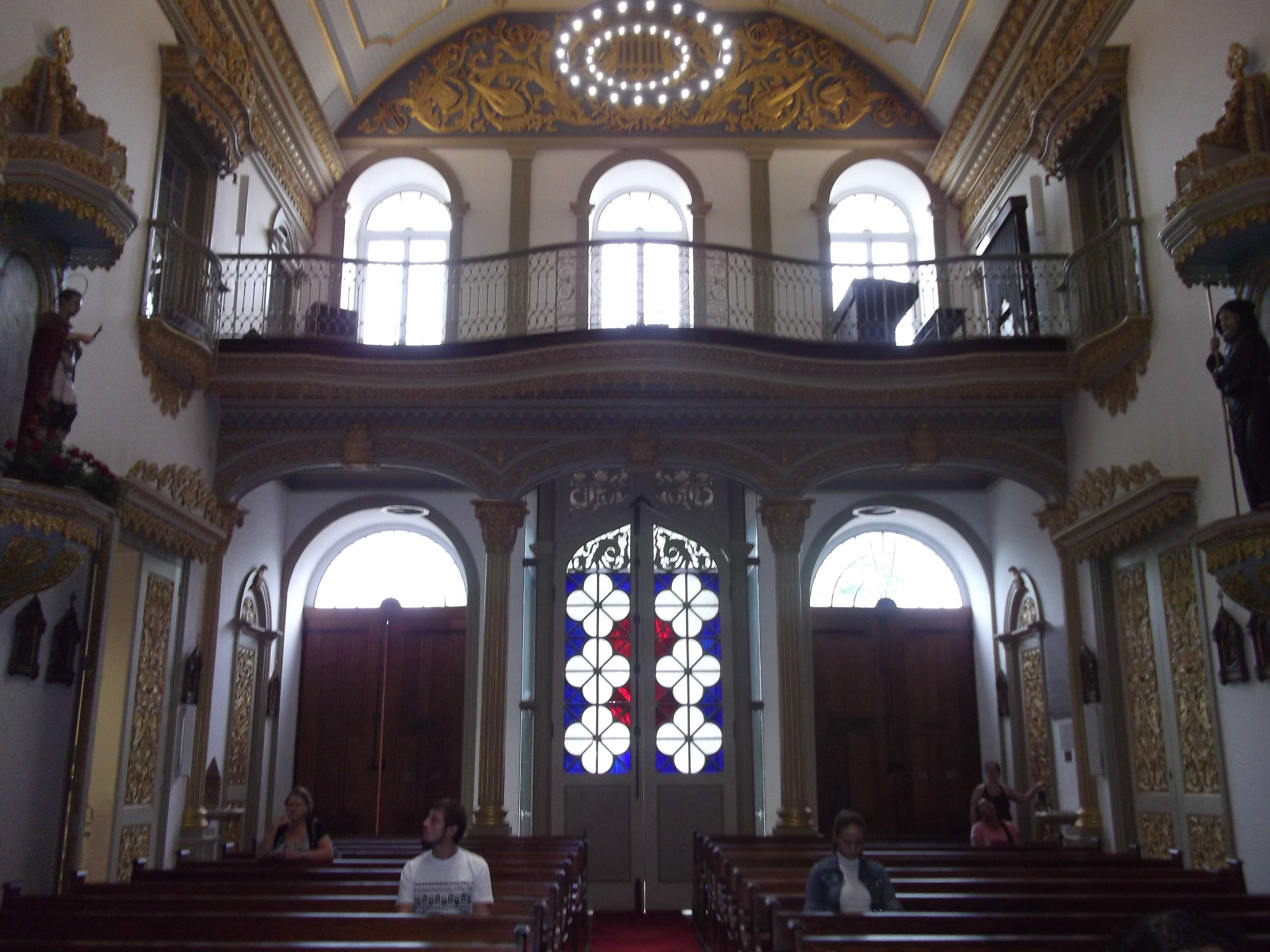
View of the entrance with the choir and the parapet.

The authorship of the project is not known. Günter Weimer suggested Luís Manoel Martins da Silva, an engineer who at the time worked for the Province Works Commission, but according to Sofia Inda, it may also have been José Pereira Maria do Campo, author of the project for the Mother Church of Canguçu. João do Couto e Silva was the master builder who designed and executed the internal decoration. The cornerstone was laid on December 8, 1851, with great solemnity and the presence of the city's illustrious men and the main brotherhoods. However, the Brotherhood was going through a great financial crisis and could not even pay for the processions. For this reason, the works remained almost paralyzed for lack of funds until 1856, but in November of that year, 1.2 conto de réis was collected, allowing the project to continue. The complex would be built in parts, according to specific contracts. The building was partially completed in 1858, with the nave and chancel at that time. On February 8, 1858, the image of the Patroness was transferred, amidst festivities, from the old Mother Church to its new home. On December 5 of the same year, the chapel was blessed and solemnly inaugurated, being subordinated to the Parish of Our Lady of the Rosary.

In 1874, Couto e Silva was contracted to carry out the completion of the towers and the doors on the facade and construction of the internal staircases and choir. The elevation of the frontispiece and the towers occurred in 1880. In the same year, the doors at the base of the towers were closed with masonry, but a report from the Brotherhood shows that there were still a number of elements that were not ready and others were modified. It was necessary to floor the consistory and make its partitions, build the stairway to the session room, close openings, fortify the internal stairways in the towers, plaster all the walls inside and out, build walls and put doors in the basement, install the sidewalk in the street in front, increase the height of the main door, raise the frontispiece, whitewash walls, install the roosters in the towers, and overhaul the roof. The report emphasized that the trimmings should enhance the beauty of the building. On May 1, 1889, the church was detached from the Parish of the Rosary and created its own parish. The construction work was completed only in 1890.

In the 1920s, an extensive facade renovation was planned to bring the style in line with the standards of the time. The renovation was not carried out, but an attached parish house was added on the east side. In 1977, the building was included by the City Hall in the Inventory of Real Estate Properties of Historical and Cultural Value and of Expressive Tradition, and in 2007 it was listed as a heritage site.

Between 2009 and 2011, the first stage of a renovation project was completed, restoring the nave, chancel, parish house and facade. The second stage foresees the recuperation of the electrical and plumbing networks, the patios, the sacristy, the catechism rooms, the statuary and the furnishings, and the installation of air conditioning. Despite being a building of great significance, security in the area is precarious and its facade has often been depredated with graffiti.

== The building ==
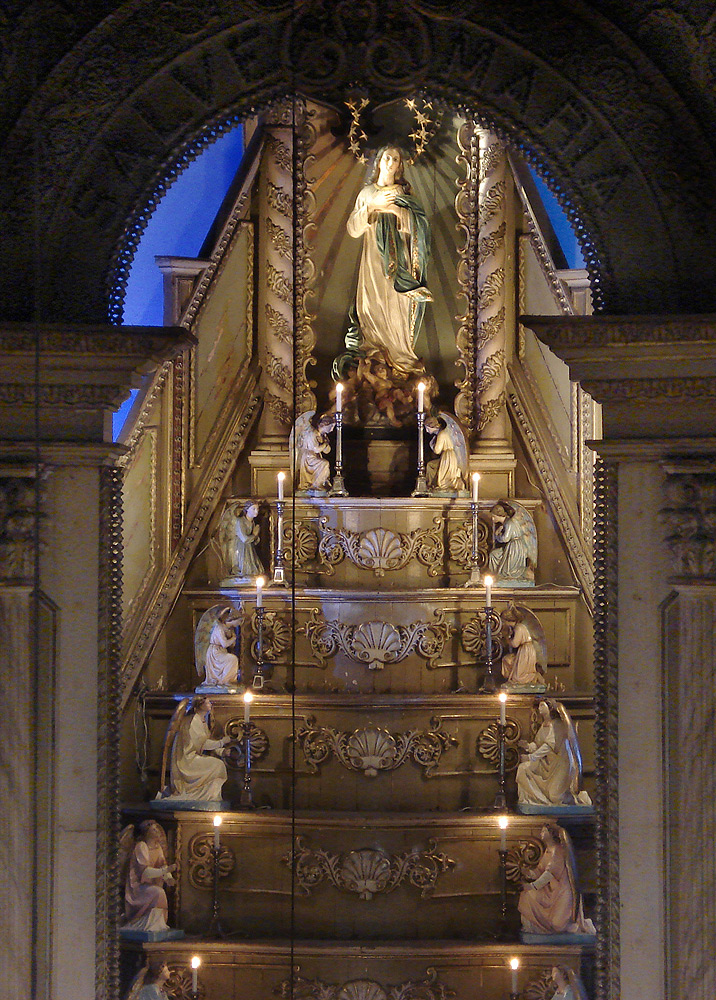
Main Altar with image of the Patroness.

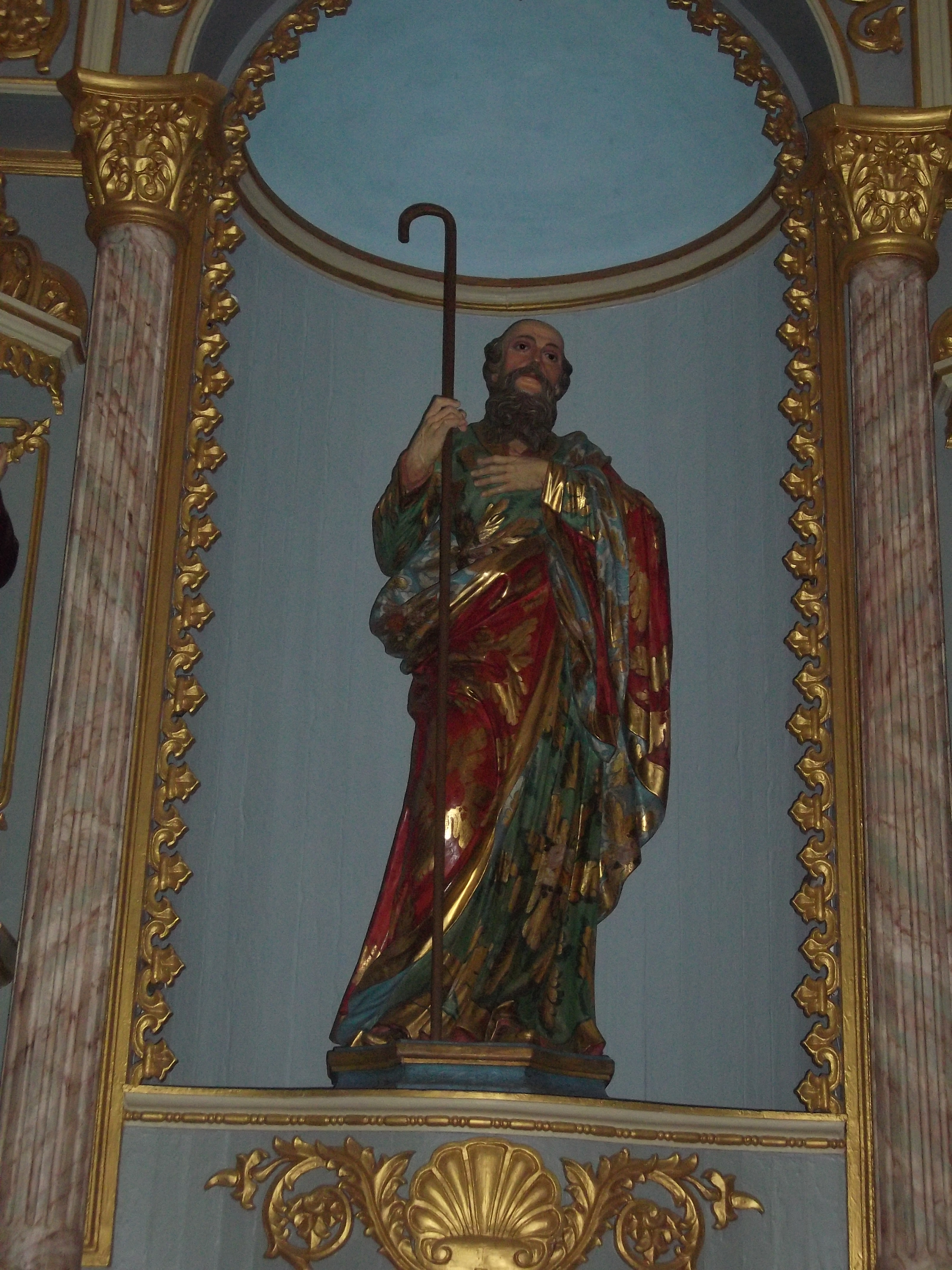
Altar of Saint Joachim.

The Church of Our Lady of the Conception is one of the oldest and best preserved in Porto Alegre, keeping its original features practically intact. Its style follows the patterns of late colonial baroque, with simple lines and a sober facade, reserving the ornamentation for the interior, which is influenced by the neoclassical style.

The foundation is made of stone and clay, the structure is masonry, and the infill is made with irregular stones. Stone elements are found in the frame of the openings and in the frontispiece. The facade is austere, typical of colonial Baroque influenced by plain architecture, with a central structure flanked by two square towers with prominent pilasters at the corners, on three levels divided by wide cornices, with round arched openings for the bells on the upper level and crowned by bulbous spires and pinecones at the corners. The central structure has a small staircase leading to the three large round arched doors at the base, closed by richly carved wooden leaves with floral motifs and stained glass windows in the spandrels. Above, three arched glazed windows, and on the third level is a triangular pediment pierced by an oculus and crowned by an iron cross.

The entrance is protected by a carved and glazed parapet, forming a vestibule. The nave of the church has bare walls, but both the side altars and the lecterns have decoration in carvings, gilding, and marbled painting. The six side altars are dedicated to the Sacred Heart, Saint Manuel, Saint Joachim, Our Lady of the Assumption, Saint Francis of Paola, and Saint Expedite. The image of the patron saint is a production of Portuguese sculpture from the 18th century, while the image of Saint Joachim includes draperies and gold painting.

The ceiling is simple, in a truncated cradle vault, but has delicate coffered ceiling, and large medallions from which crystal chandeliers hang. At the junction between the ceiling and the walls there is a wide frieze of design. The choir over the main entrance is also adorned with gilded carvings and wrought iron railings, with a sinuous design supported by wooden columns enclosing three collapsed arches. Completing the decoration of the choir, above the front windows is a large frieze carved with scrolls, phytomorphic elements, and musical instruments. Below the choir is the carved signature of the master Couto e Silva.

The chancel, bordered by a carved arch, includes tribunes, the celebration table, and behind it a large altar in a staircase leading up to the image of the patron saint at the top, housed in a niche with a baldachin. The bibliography mentions that formerly the image of Saint Joseph of the Good Death was under the table, but today it is next to the first side chapel on the right.

For Moacyr Flores, the church, "with its simple and simple exterior and impressive carved woodwork in its interior, constitutes a place of memory filled with reminiscences that allow us to establish a temporal bridge connecting the spirituality of the present with the spirituality of the past". It is one of the most iconic buildings in the city. Athos Damasceno used a carved flower from the church door to illustrate the cover of his classic Artes Plásticas no Rio Grande do Sul (1971).

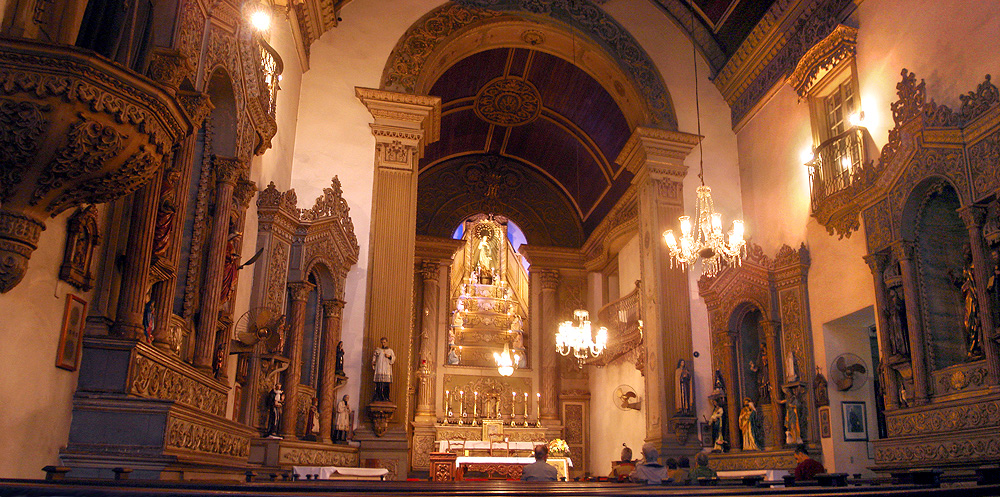
Interior before restoration.

== See also ==
- History of Porto Alegre
- Architecture of Porto Alegre
