= João Batista Becker =

German-Brazilian Catholic prelate (1870–1946)

Styles of João Becker
- Reference style: The Most Reverend
- Spoken style: Your Excellency
- Religious style: Monsignor
- Posthumous style: nonle

João Batista Becker (February 24, 1870 – June 15, 1946) was a German-Brazilian prelate of the Roman Catholic Church, serving as Archbishop of Porto Alegre from 1912 until his death.

Born in Sankt Wendel, Germany, he was ordained to the priesthood on August 2, 1886.

On May 3, 1908, Becker was appointed the first Bishop of Santa Caterina, Brazil, by Pope Pius X. He received his episcopal consecration on the following September 18 from Archbishop Cláudio Gonçalves Ponce de Leon, CM, with Bishops João Braga and João Pimenta serving as co-consecrators. Becker was later named Archbishop of Porto Alegre on August 1, 1912, being installed as such on December 8 of that same year.

In October 1930, the Archbishop praised the Revolution, saying, "The Rio Grande do Sul forces are formed of the pick of our youth, and with dignity and honor. The military organization is perfect. The national revolution, a logical consequence of regrettable facts, goes irresistibly on its way to triumph. Religious feeling animates and strengthens our soldiers. The victory of the allied troops will begin a new era of national prosperity. May the Lord of Hosts shorten the days of the struggle, and grant us peace, from north and south, for the happiness of the nation and the glory of religion".

He died at age 76, after serving as Porto Alegre's archbishop for thirty-three years.

Preceded by none	Bishop of Santa Caterina; 1908–1912	Succeeded by Joaquim Domingues de Oliveira
Preceded by João Becker	Archbishop of Porto Alegre; 1912–1946	Succeeded by Alfredo Scherer
