= Argentina Palace =

Historic building in Rio Grande do Sul, Brazil

- Palacete Argentina
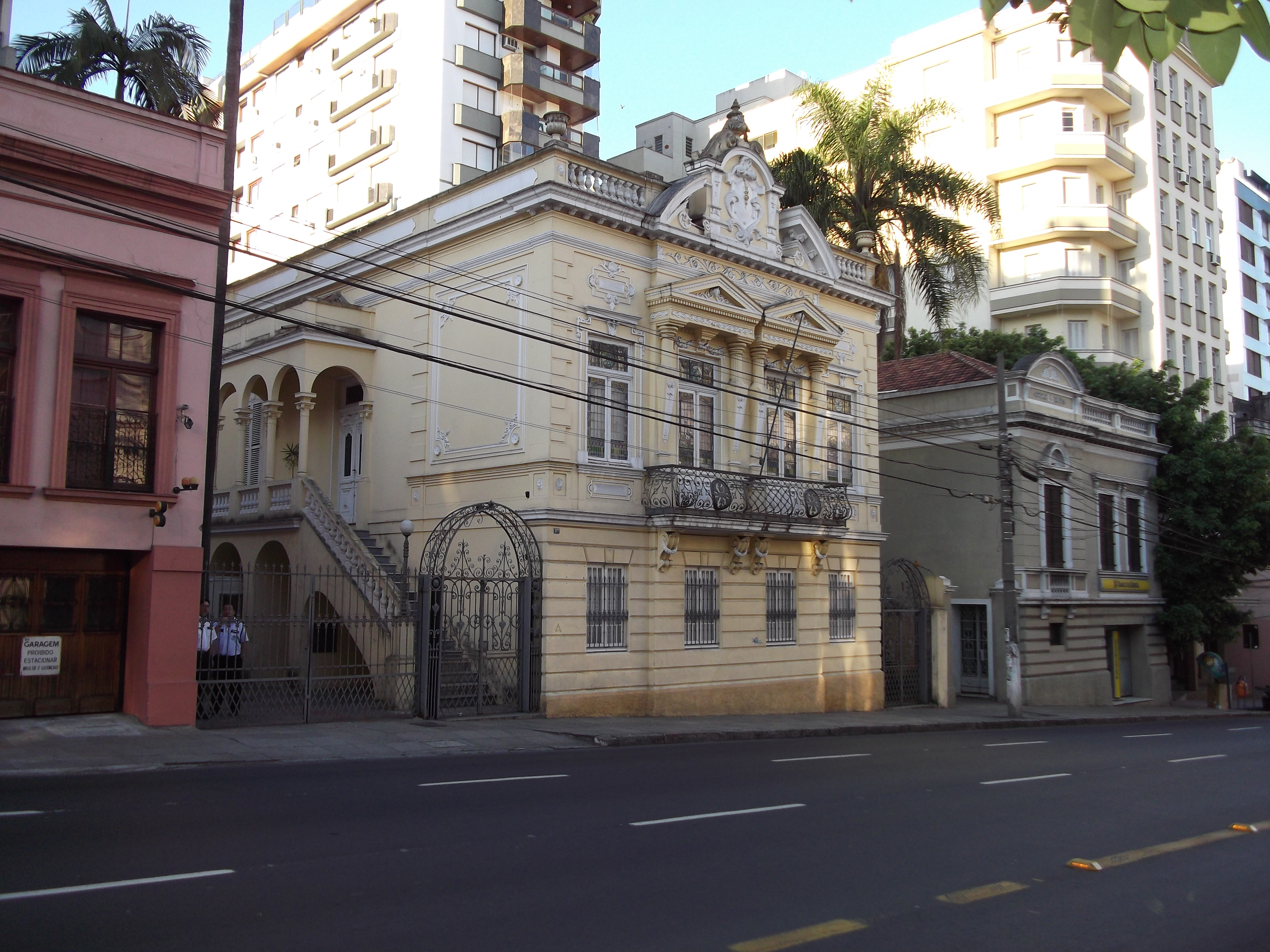

General information
- Architectural style: Eclectic
- Location: Porto Alegre, Rio Grande do Sul; Brazil
- Coordinates: 30°01′46″S 51°12′46″W
- Inaugurated: 1901
- Owner: Rio Grande do Sul State Government

Technical details
- Floor area: 756m²

Design and construction
- Architect(s): Theóphilo Borges de Barros

Argentina Palace (Portuguese: Palacete Argentina) is a historic building located in the Brazilian city of Porto Alegre, in the state of Rio Grande do Sul. It is a heritage site listed by the National Institute of Historic and Artistic Heritage (IPHAN).

== History ==
Argentina Palace is an eclectic-style building erected in 1901 for Sebastião de Barros. It passed to his daughter, Manoelita Lilia Etzenberger, when she married Alceu Otacílio Barbedo. The project was designed by Theóphilo Borges de Barros and executed by the Tomatis Brothers. Later, it was sold to Franklin Etzberger. In 1928, it underwent a renovation in which arches supported by Solomonic columns were opened in some walls. A tea room, a winter garden and service rooms were also added to the lower floor. The current name originated when it was occupied by the Argentina School Group in 1940.

In 1971, the Rio Grande do Sul State Government declared the property to be of public utility and expropriated it. In 1984 it underwent restoration by IPHAN, which installed its regional headquarters in the building and listed it as a heritage site in 1990. The building has two floors and a basement. It preserves rich ornamental decoration on the facade. Originally, the interior was luxurious with mural paintings, stained glass windows, wood carvings and other sophisticated adornments. It belongs to a limited group of buildings of a similar size that remain on the area, which used to be an elite residential neighborhood.

In 2003, it underwent a preservation renovation sponsored by IPHAN and the Southern Regional Office of the Ministry of Culture (MINc). The work, under the command of Ana Meira, ended in 2006 and cost R$ 440,000. It included repairs to plastering, stained glass windows, the facade of the house and the electrical network.

== See also ==
- History of Porto Alegre
- Architecture of Porto Alegre
- Architecture of Brazil
