= David Zeiger (industrialist) =

Brazilian industrialist

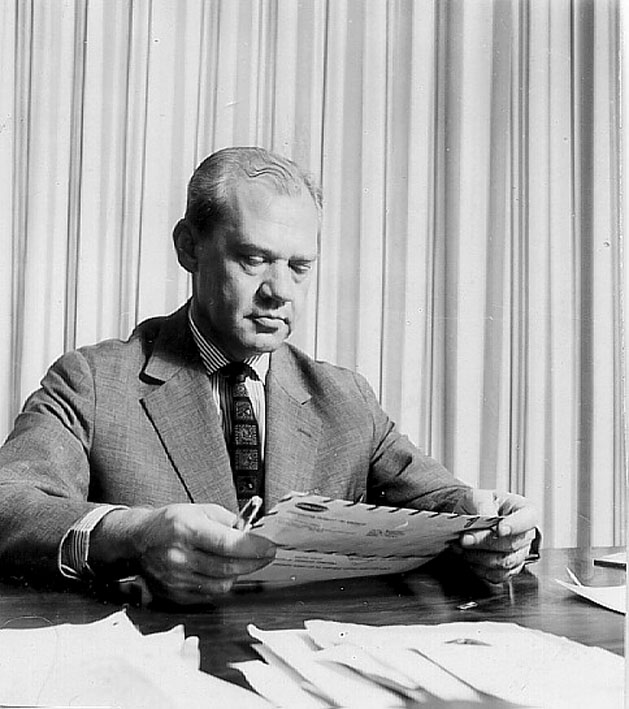
- Born: 21 February 1918; Kovel, Ukrainian People's Republic
- Died: 10 May 1981 (aged 63); São Paulo, Brazil
- Occupation: Businessman
- Spouse: Emilia Zeiger (born Liberman Mila Zeiger)
- Children: Sergio Zeiger, Claudio Zeiger, Eduardo Zeiger and Celia Zeiger

David Zeiger (February 21, 1918 - May 10, 1981) was a Brazilian industrialist in the area of clothing and fashion.

Zeiger's family immigrated from Ukraine (formerly Poland) to Brazil in the early 1920s. David with his siblings and mother, met with his father Shaja Zeiger, who had left Poland a year earlier. His father, Shaja Zeiger, was a tailor, and in a few years founded Goomtex, a factory for raincoats and overcoats. As a young man, David Zeiger worked with his father, and soon became the manager of the business. After his marriage, David Zeiger began to run Pullsport—a women's fashion factory—along with his wife Mila Zeiger.

David Zeiger was also involved in the topics of culture, philanthropy, and publicity.

== Early years and education ==
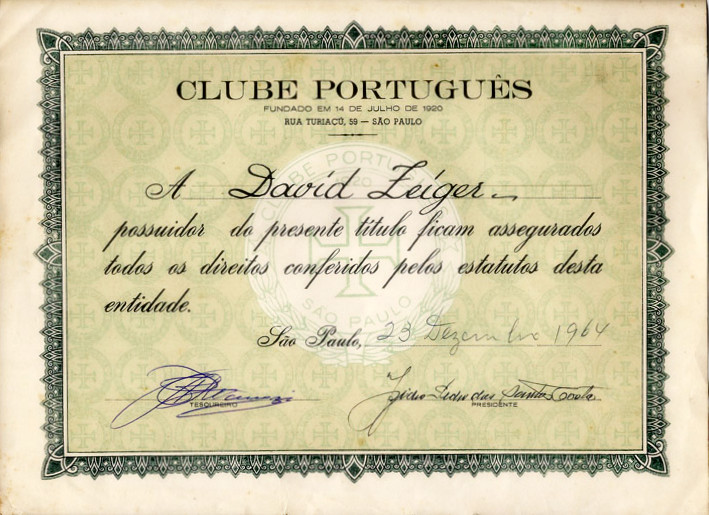

Zeiger was born in Kovel, Poland, which is now part of Ukraine. Although raised and educated within the community of Jewish immigrants in the São Paulo neighborhood of Bom Retiro, the adolescent Zeiger already had a good command of Portuguese and a curiosity for Brazilian culture that led him to seek friendships outside the small European community where he lived.

He became a member of the Espéria club, and of the Tietê regatta club in which he participated as a rower in competitions. He joined the Portugália club, which published a newspaper with texts written by various members. His news stories and fiction began to be published under the guidance of the poet Mario Gallo. Zeiger finished his education at the São Paulo Technical School of Accounting.

== Community activities ==
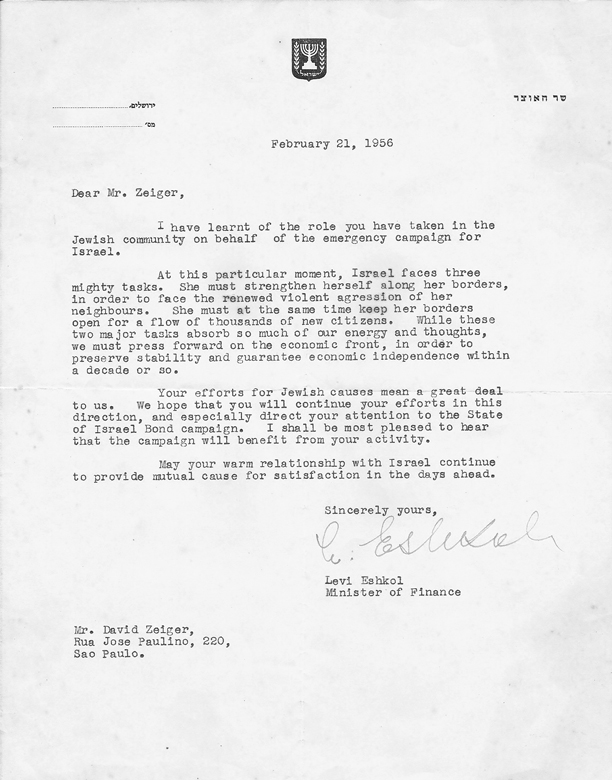

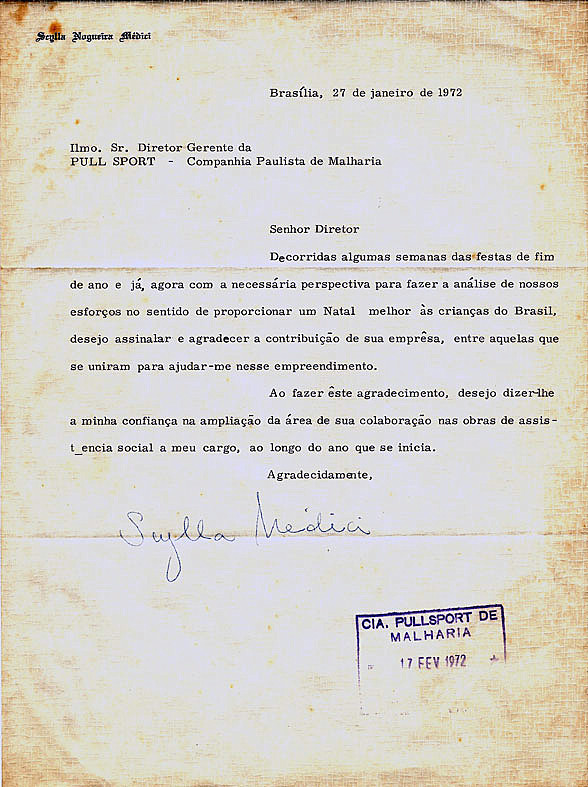

After World War II, Zeiger began his philanthropic activities. He helped raise funds and contributed his own resources to the newly created state of Israel.

Most of his efforts were for social causes focused on Brazil. He assisted Carmem Prudente in the establishment of the Hospital do Câncer, and in the charitable campaigns that followed.

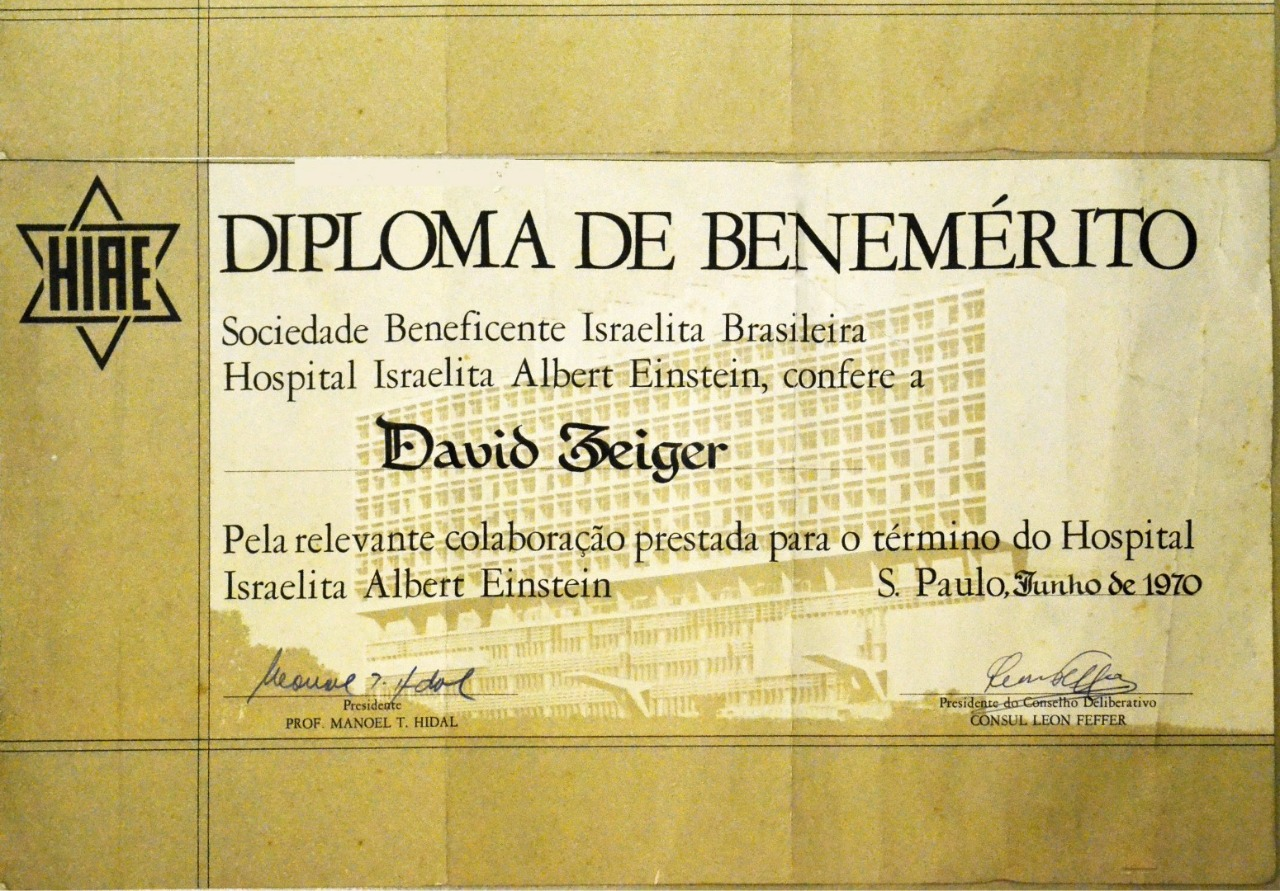
miniaturadaimagem

He was an initial donor of the Hospital Israelita Albert Einstein. He gave medical access to his employees through the network of SERMA clinics.

== Citizenship and politics ==
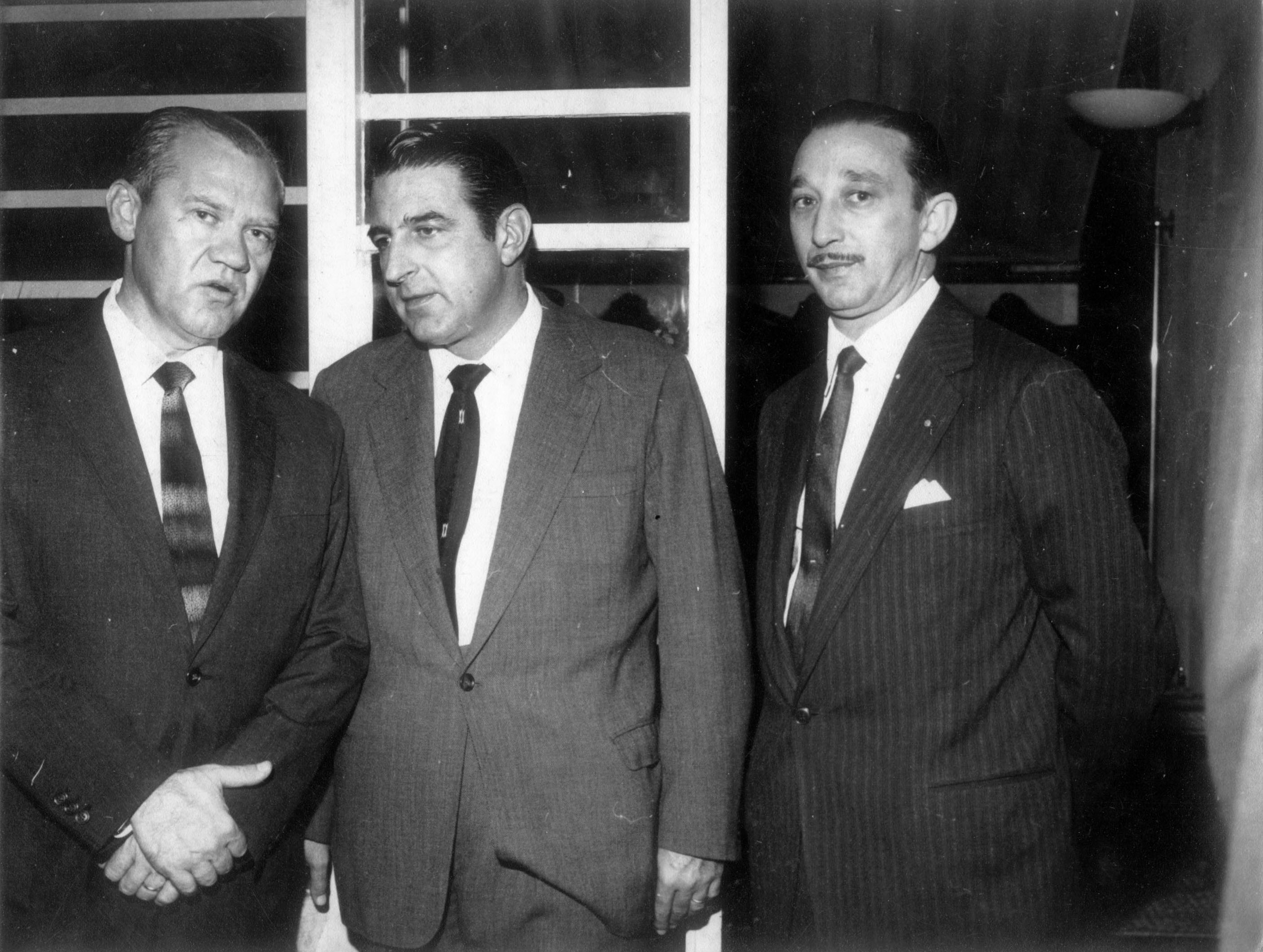

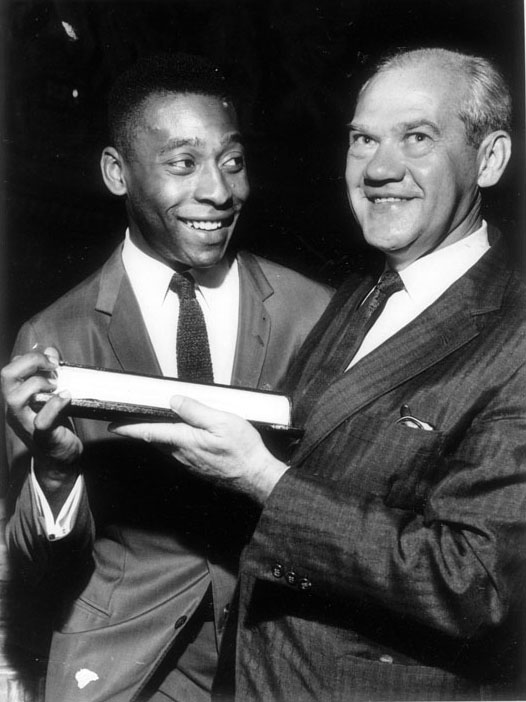

Zeiger believed in a Brazil based on the market economy of the United States—with a vast middle class, general access to education and medical services. During the Juscelino Kubitschek administration (1956 to 1961), he found a favorable climate for this view, which would help Brazil to move out of its agrarian economy to become an industrial giant. At that time Zeiger met congressman Antônio Sílvio Cunha Bueno, with whom he developed a long friendship, and through which he began to participate more actively in the political climate of the country. Zeiger promoted Cunha Bueno within the Jewish community. The friendship with the Cunha Bueno family resulted in two homages: David Zeiger Public School, and David Zeiger Street, both in São Paulo.

== Career ==
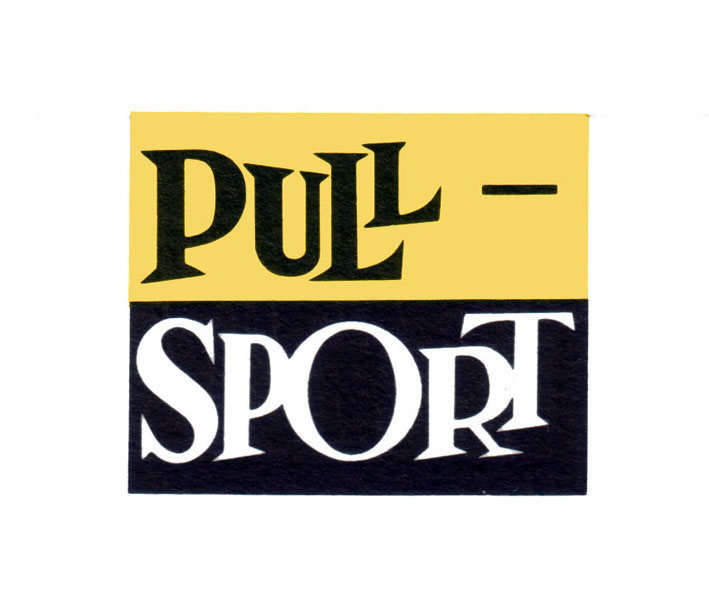

During the years of the "Economic Miracle" in the 1960s and 1970s, David Zeiger's business expanded quickly. His factory (Cia Pullsport of Malharia) grew to occupy two buildings of seven floors with 500 employees.

In 1967, Time magazine published a cover story with the photo of President Costa e Silva. The subject was the surge of progress in the economy of Brazil. It quoted examples of leaders in various fields of activity, and presented Zeiger as an example of an industrialist.

== Other interests ==
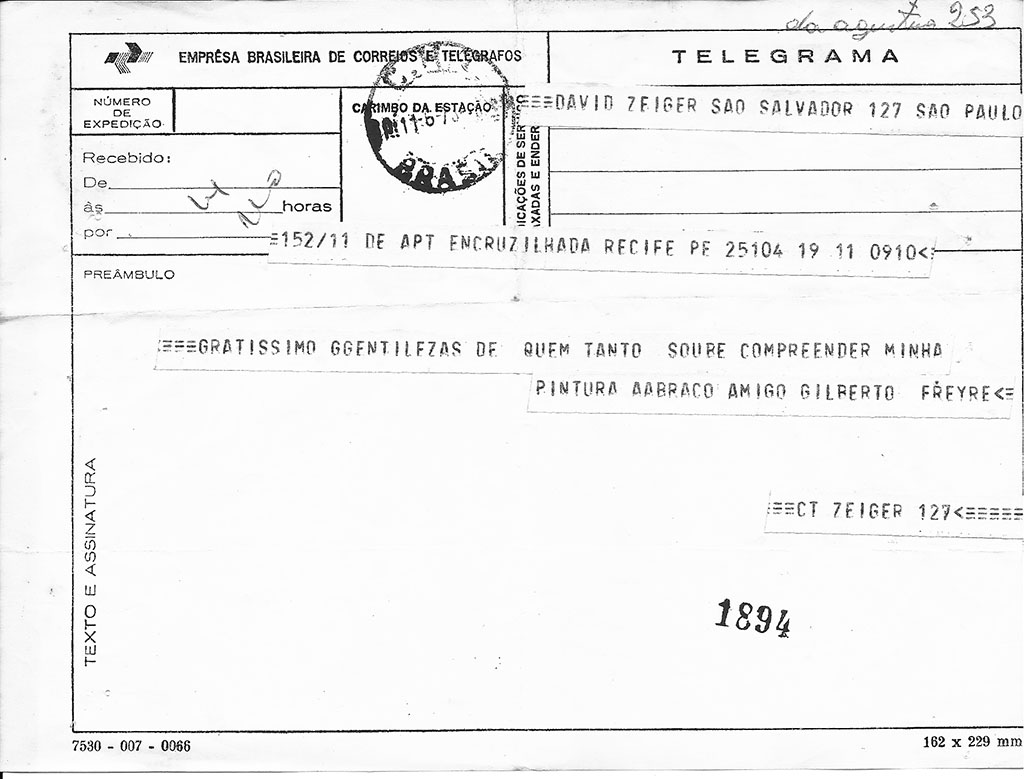

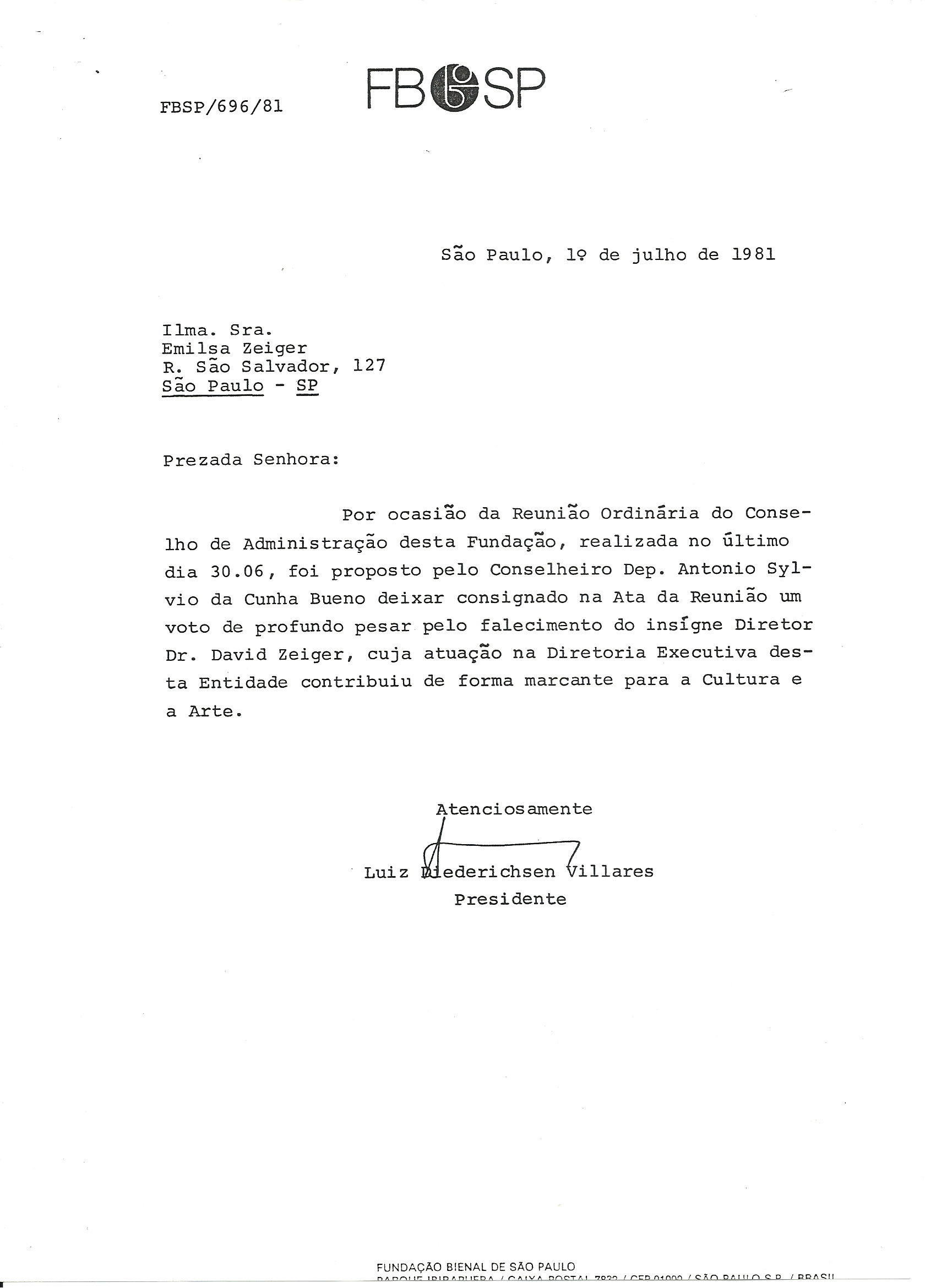

Zeiger participated from the beginning in the textile fairs established by Caio de Alcântara Machado (FENIT), the board of directors of the International São Paulo Art Biennial, and sponsored a project aimed at integrating a cultural center with theaters and concert halls in the Ibirapuera Park. He was also an art collector. In his view, the city of São Paulo had the potential to become the most important metropolis in Latin America.
