= Zeiser =

Zeiser is a surname. Notable people with the surname include:

- Franz Zeiser, Swiss footballer
- Matt Zeiser (1888–1942), American baseball pitcher
- Rudolf Zeiser (1936–1993), German footballer

== See also ==
- Zeiger
- Zeisel
