= Hospital das Clínicas =

Hospital das Clínicas or Hospital de Clínicas (Clinics Hospital) is a denomination traditionally reserved for teaching hospitals in Brazil. Another common denomination is Hospital Universitário (University Hospital).

There are several hospitals under these names in Brazil:

- Hospital das Clínicas da Universidade de São Paulo, one of the three teaching hospitals of the University of São Paulo, São Paulo, the two others being:
  - Hospital Universitário da Universidade de São Paulo, in São Paulo
  - Hospital das Clínicas de Ribeirão Preto, at the Faculdade de Medicina de Ribeirão Preto, in Ribeirão Preto, state of Sâo Paulo
- Hospital de Clínicas da Universidade Estadual de Campinas, teaching hospital of the State University of Campinas, in Campinas, state of São Paulo
- Hospital de Clínicas de Porto Alegre of the Universidade Federal do Rio Grande do Sul, Porto Alegre, state of Rio Grande do Sul

Other institutions are:

- Hospital das Clínicas da Universidade Federal do Paraná, in Curitiba, state of Paraná
- Hospital Universitário Clementino Fraga Filho of the Federal University of Rio de Janeiro, in Rio de Janeiro
- Hospital Universitário Pedro Ernesto of the University of the State of Rio de Janeiro, in Rio de Janeiro
- Hospital Universitário Polydoro Ernani de São Thiago of the Federal University of Santa Catarina, in Florianópolis, Santa Catarina
- Hospital Universitário Prof. Alberto Antunes of the Federal University of Alagoas, in Maceió, Alagoas
- Hospital das Clínicas of Federal University of Goiás, in Goiânia, Goiás

== See also ==
- Hospital de Clínicas "José de San Martín", in Argentina
- Hospital de Clínicas "Dr. Manuel Quintela", in Uruguay
