= Rua do Arvoredo murders =

Brazilian serial murder case

José Ramos
- Born: Unknown; Santa Catarina, Brazil
- Died: 1893; Santa Casa de Misericordia Hospital, Porto Alegre, Brazil
- Other name: "The Butcher of Rua do Arvoredo"
- Conviction: Murder x3
- Penalty: Death; commuted to life imprisonment

Details
- Victims: 9+
- Span of crimes: 1863–1864
- Country: Brazil
- State: Rio Grande do Sul
- Date apprehended: 1864

The Rua do Arvoredo murders were a series of murders perpetrated between 1863 and 1864 in Porto Alegre, Brazil. The murderers (José Ramos, his Hungarian wife Catarina Palse and German butcher Carlos Claussner) lured in predominantly German immigrants and killed them, allegedly disposing of the remains by turning the body parts into sausages, which they subsequently sold at their butcher shop. Despite being a real case, it has been elevated to an urban legend to the local population.

== Perpetrators ==
=== José Ramos ===
José Ramos was the eldest son of Manoel Ramos and Maria da Conceição. His father was a cavalryman who served under Bento Gonçalves da Silva during the Ragamuffin War, who deserted his battalion and took refuge in Santa Catarina. During a family argument, his father attacked his mother, resulting in Ramos seriously injuring his father with a knife, which eventually led to his death a few days later.

Hence, the young Ramos went to Rio Grande do Sul and became a police inspector in Porto Alegre, where he either bought or rented a house on Rua do Arvoredo (now Rua Coronel Fernando Machado, 707), which belonged to a butcher named Carlos Claussner. Ramos would later be expelled from the police force when he was caught attempting to behead Domingos José da Costa, a famous bandit revered as a Robin Hood-like figure who had been captured in Vacaria in 1862, claiming that he had attempted to escape. After that, Ramos served as a police informant.

Ramos was part of the high society of Porto Alegre, with a passion for lyrical music and poetry. While attending a play at the recently opened São Pedro Theatre, he met Catarina Palse, who later became his wife.

=== Catarina Palse ===
Catarina Palse, his wife, was the prime accomplice in the killings, responsible for attracting the victims to their residence and later covering up their tracks.

Coming from a poor ethnic German family based in the Hungarian part of Transylvania, Palse grew up in small village with parents and two brothers. During the Hungarian Revolution of 1848, she was raped by soldiers and had to watch her entire family be murdered. Later, at age 15, she married Peter Palse solely so she could flee the country and poverty. During the trip, her marriage was cut short, as her husband committed suicide.

At 20 years of age, she arrived in Porto Alegre in 1857. She ended up getting involved with José Ramos in 1863, with both of them moving in together at Rua do Arvoredo, near the cemetery behind the Metropolitan Cathedral of Our Lady Mother of God.

=== Carlos Claussner ===
Carlos Claussner was a German immigrant who owned a butcher shop behind the Nossa Senhora das Dores Church at Rua de Ponte (now Rua Riachuelo).

Since his arrival in Brazil in 1859 and opening up his shop, Claussner achieved financial success due to the strategic location of his establishment. However, he was lonely, and when he met Ramos, who spoke German, the two instantly befriended one another, with Claussner later taking on Ramos as his apprentice.

== Murders ==
The murders began in 1863, with Ramos and Palse meeting in public places frequented by the city's elite, analyzing who would be a suitable victim. They preferred German immigrants, since Palse didn't speak Portuguese.

After choosing the victim, Palse seduced them and made appointments at Beco de Ópera (now Rua Uruguai). She lured them to Ramos' house, where the victims had their belongings stolen, and they themselves were later beheaded, dismembered and their skin stripped. The meat was later ground into sausages and sold at Claussner's butcher shop. According to testimonies from the time, Claussner had suggested to Ramos that they do this to cover up any evidence; the bones would be dissolved in acid or incinerated in the butcher shop. Although the exact number of victims remains a mystery, it has been suggested that at least six men fell prey to the killers in this fashion.

In August 1863, the mysterious series of disappearances caused a panic in the city, pressuring the authorities to look into it. The possible repercussions for the murders began to frighten Claussner, who planned to flee to Uruguay because he claimed to be unhappy living in Porto Alegre. Thus, Ramos, fearing that his partner might tell the police, killed him and hid the body in his back yard. The couple eventually took over Claussner's business, and when asked about where the original owner had gone, Ramos claimed that the store and house had been sold to him. However, not long after the business failed, as neither Ramos nor Palse had the necessary knowledge to keep it running.

The crimes were finally uncovered in 1864, with the disappearances of travelling salesman José Ignacio de Souza Ávila and the Portuguese merchant Januário Martins Ramos da Silva, both of whom were last seen the day before at José Ramos' house. When they were summoned to the police station for testimony, Ramos claimed that the men had stayed overnight and left for São Sebastião do Caí the next morning. The delegate, not satisfied with their answers, ordered that the house be searched, revealing evidence pointing to criminal behavior. There were various indicators that people had been killed in the house, most damning of which were personal possessions belonging to the victims, which Ramos had kept as souvenirs.

During the search, several pieces of decomposing human body parts were found buried in the basement, which were later identified as Claussner's. In the well, the mutilated bodies of Januário and José Ignacio were found, as well as Ignacio's dog, which had had its belly ripped open. Palse, who by then had been arrested for other crimes and had become a mucker, decided to confess that six men had been killed in the house, and that Carlos Claussner later turned the victims' bodies into sausages. Her diary would later become the starting point for investigating the other murders.

== Aftermath ==
Ramos and Palse killed the victims in order to steal their money, with the sole exception of José Ignacio de Souza Ávila, who was killed for being a witness. Delegate Dario Rafael Callado, who was the Police Chief and Justice at the time, had Ramos as his police informant at the time, and in order to avoid embarrassment, sped up the trial. Callado had already been publicly attacked by deputy Silveira Martins for having made several illegal arrests.

At the trial, Justice Callado convicted José Ramos on multiple counts of robbery and murder, sentencing him to death by hanging, which was later commuted to life imprisonment; he denied his crimes until his death at the Santa Casa de Misericordia Hospital in 1893. Palse, now rearrested as an accomplice, was sentenced to 13 years imprisonment. On May 6, 1891, it was reported that she had been released after fully serving her sentence. The case was barely covered by the Porto Alegre press at the time, with more prominence in international newspapers.

The manufactured linguiças sold in Porto Alegre had "very good acceptance", and since this detail was disclosed to the public, rumors began circulating around the case. The Rua do Arvoredo murders are deposited in the Brazilian National Archives, in Rio de Janeiro. According to historian Décio Freitas, author of the book The Greatest Crime on Earth, "there is a lack of information such as several sheets lost during the trial, the documents and manuscripts are all in ancient Portuguese. The fact is that the crime truly existed, however, the evidence on sausages made with human meat was rendered unfeasible in the course of the trial and with the passage of time. Therefore, we will never know if the story is completely true".

== In modern media ==
In Europe, the crime was covered so much that Charles Darwin wrote a short commentary in his notebook, asking: "Is there a jackal asleep in each man?".

In 1987, the case inspired the publication of the book Cães da província, by Luiz Antonio de Assis Brasil. The book centers around the biography of playwright and dramaturgist José Joaquim de Campos Leão, and along with this narrative, De Assis Brasil also includes the Rua do Arvoredo murders in the story. The book was republished in 2010 by L&PM Editores.

In 1996, the historian Décio Freitas published the book The Greatest Crime on Earth - The Butcher on Rua do Arvoredo, after researching the case.

Later in 2005, the case would also serve as an inspiration for a novel written by David Coimbra, titled Canibais: Paixão e Morte na Rua do Arvoredo, also published by L&PM Editores.

In Rio Grande do Sul, Grupo RBS - an affiliate of Rede Globo based in the state - produced a documentary about the case. Another documentary, made by independent filmmakers, was also produced.

On April 28, 2006, Rede Globo made an episode for Linha Direta dramatizing the case. Carmo Dalla Vecchia played the role of José Ramos, while Natália Lage played Catarina. The soundtrack for the episode included several songs by English rock band Radiohead. To reconstruct the crime, the Linha Direta team conducted extensive research work, looking into the public archives, examining everything from the receipts, Pilse and Claussner's passports and even the autopsy reports.

== See also ==
- Garanhuns cannibals
- List of serial killers in Brazil

== Bibliography ==
- Sérgio da Costa Franco. Porto Alegre Historical Guide. Porto Alegre: University Publisher (UFRGS)/Prefeitura Municipal, 1992. (in Portuguese)
- Cláudio Pereira Elmir. A story in search of its motive: methodical essay (The crimes on Rua do Arvoredo, Porto Alegre, 1863–4), Unisinos. (in Portuguese)
