= Zeiger =

Zeiger is a surname of German and Ashkenazic origin. Notable people with the surname include:

- Larry King, born Lawrence Harvey Zeiger, American television and radio host.
- Hans Zeiger, American politician and member of Washington State Senate.
- Joanna Zeiger, American triathlete.
- David Zeiger, Brazilian industrialist.
- Mila Zeiger, Brazilian businesswoman.
- Roni Zeiger, American physician.
- Eliezer (Eduardo) Zeiger, American biologist.
- David Zeiger, American film director and producer.
- Yitzhak Seiger, Israeli politician
- Igor Zeiger, Israeli artist
