= Institute for Cancer Research =

Institute for Cancer Research can refer to a number of separate organizations:

- Institute of Cancer Research, located in London, United Kingdom
- Institute of Cancer of São Paulo
- American Institute for Cancer Research, located in Washington, DC
- Institute for Cancer Research, founded in 1927 and now known as Lankenau Institute for Medical Research
- Fox Chase Cancer Center, formed by the merger of the Institute for Cancer Research and the American Oncologic Hospital
