= Renato Procianoy =

Brazilian physician, professor, researcher

Renato Soibelmann Procianoy
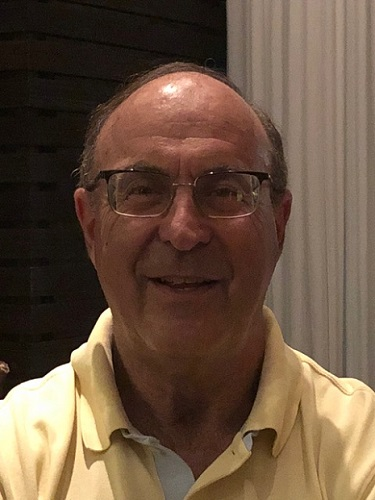
- Born: Pelotas, Rio Grande do Sul, Brazil
- Education: Federal University of Rio Grande do Sul; University of São Paulo; Baylor College of Medicine
- Known for: Neonatal sepsis, prematurity, neonatal intensive care
- Scientific career
- Fields: Neonatology
- Workplaces: Federal University of Rio Grande do Sul

Renato Soibelmann Procianoy is a Brazilian physician, university professor, and medical researcher whose work in neonatology has contributed significantly to clinical protocols and medical education in Brazil and internationally. He is a full professor of Pediatrics at the Federal University of Rio Grande do Sul (UFRGS) and preceptor of the Neonatology Residency Program at the Hospital de Clínicas de Porto Alegre (HCPA).

== Academic background and career ==
Procianoy earned his medical degree from the Federal University of Rio Grande do Sul and completed his residency in Pediatrics at the Hospital dos Servidores do Estado in Rio de Janeiro. He went on to complete both a master's degree and a Ph.D. at the University of São Paulo. He later trained in the United States, completing a fellowship in Neonatology at Texas Children’s Hospital, affiliated with the Baylor College of Medicine.

Currently, he holds several academic and leadership roles:

- Full Professor of Pediatrics at UFRGS
- Residency supervisor in Neonatology at the Hospital de Clínicas de Porto Alegre
- Member of the Brazilian Academy of Pediatrics
- Editor-in-chief of the Jornal de Pediatria (Rio de Janeiro) since 2002
- Program director of the Neonatology Continuing Education Program (PRORN), developed by Artmed since 2002

== Research and scientific production ==
Procianoy is one of Brazil’s most cited neonatologists, with an extensive body of work published in both national and international peer-reviewed journals. His research focuses on:

- Neonatal sepsis;
- Prematurity and its long-term consequences;
- Nutrition, growth, and neurodevelopment of low birth weight infants.

He has served as Principal Investigator in projects funded by the Bill & Melinda Gates Foundation, including groundbreaking studies on fetal microbiota and its association with prematurity and neonatal morbidities.

In 1991, he authored the textbook Cadernos de Terapêutica em Pediatria – Neonatologia (Therapeutic Notebooks in Pediatrics – Neonatology), which became a key reference in Brazilian pediatric education.

His work is widely cited and used as reference in clinical guidelines and academic programs across Latin America.

== Awards and recognition ==
Throughout his career, Procianoy has received numerous honors for his academic and professional contributions. Some of the most notable include:

- Jornal de Pediatria Award (1973)
- Nicola Albano Award (1998)
- José Lauro Araújo Ramos Award (2000)

He is an elected member of the Academia Brasileira de Pediatria and has played key roles in advisory committees of the Brazilian Society of Pediatrics.

== Societal impact ==
Procianoy’s contributions to neonatology have had a measurable impact on healthcare outcomes in Brazil. His research on neonatal sepsis diagnostics and management has informed national health protocols, and his advocacy for evidence-based neonatal nutrition has improved the care of premature and low birth weight infants.

As a professor and mentor, he has trained generations of pediatricians, neonatologists, and clinical researchers. His role in the leadership of the Jornal de Pediatria, a pediatric journal based in Latin America, has contributed to the dissemination of pediatric research throughout the Portuguese- and Spanish-speaking world.

== Selected publications ==
- Silveira RC, Valentini NC, O’Shea TM, Mendes EW, Froes G, Cauduro L, Panceri C, Fuentefria RN, Procianoy RS. Parent-Guided Developmental Intervention for Infants With Very Low Birth Weight: A Randomized Clinical Trial. JAMA Network Open. 2024;7(7):e2421896. DOI
- Procianoy RS, et al. Attention-deficit/hyperactivity disorder and very preterm/very low birth weight: a meta-analysis. Pediatrics. 2018;141(1):e20171645. DOI
- Procianoy RS, et al. Evaluation of interleukin‐6, tumour necrosis factor‐α and interleukin‐1β for early diagnosis of neonatal sepsis. Acta Paediatrica. 1999;88(6):647–650. DOI
- Procianoy RS, Silveira RC. The challenges of neonatal sepsis management. Jornal de Pediatria. 2020;96(Suppl 1):S80–S86.
- Procianoy RS, Silveira RC. Preterm newborns’ postnatal growth patterns: how to evaluate them. Jornal de Pediatria. 2019;95(Suppl 1):S56–S60.

== See also ==
- Neonatal sepsis
- Premature birth
