= Hospital das Clínicas da Unicamp =

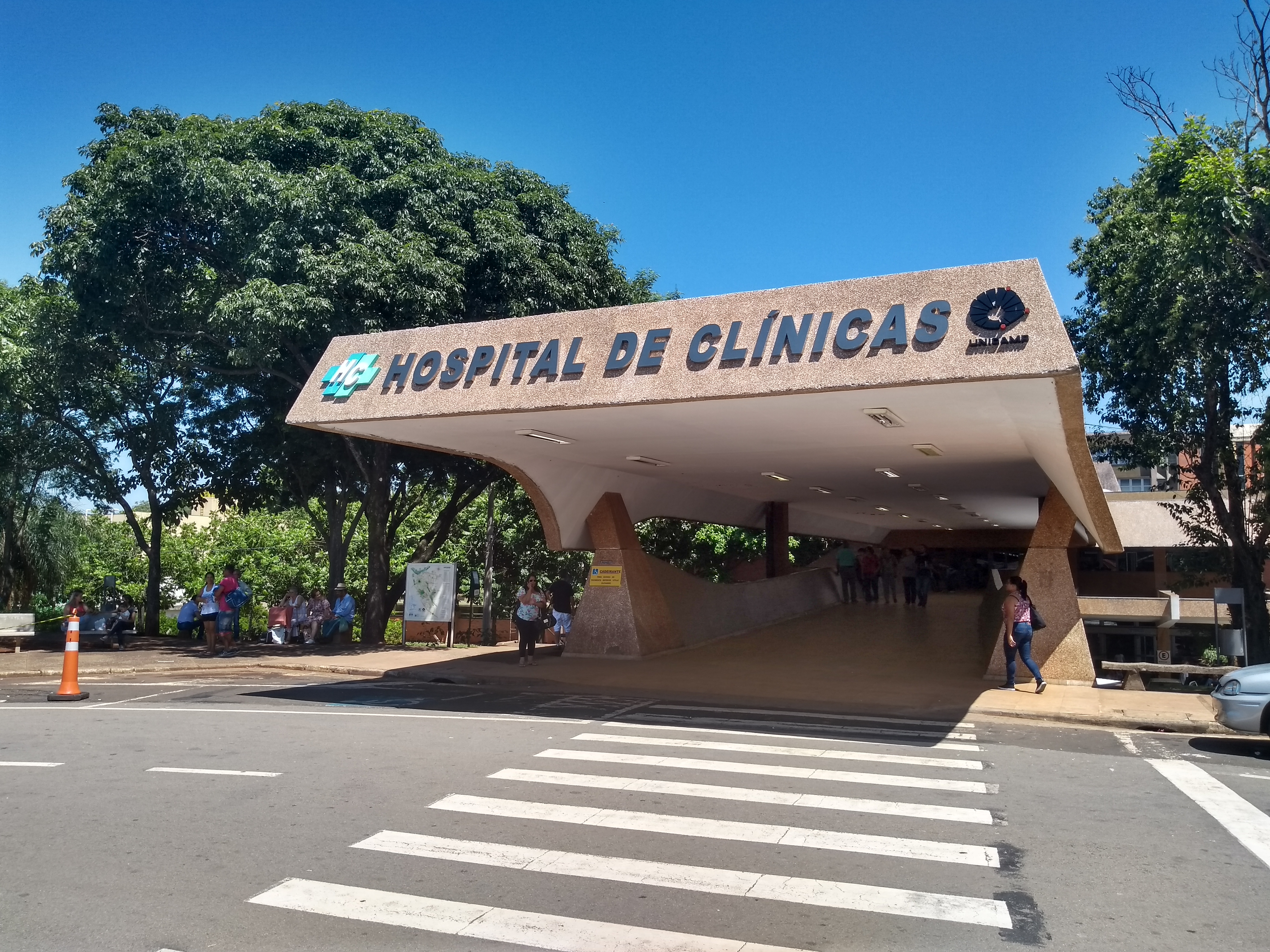

Geography
- Location: Campinas, state of São Paulo, Brazil
- Coordinates: 22°49′35″S 47°03′51″W

Organisation
- Type: Teaching hospital

Services
- Beds: more than 600

Links
- Website: www.hc.unicamp.br
- Lists: Hospitals in Brazil

The Hospital das Clínicas da Unicamp (Clinics Hospital of the University of Campinas, in Portuguese language) is a teaching hospital (Hospital das Clínicas) located in the city of Campinas, state of São Paulo, Brazil.

The largest public hospital in the region, it serves a population around 3.5 million people. It is a tertiary hospital, with all the medical specialties and medico-surgical services represented. It offers a total of more than 600 beds.
