= Hospital das Clínicas de Ribeirão Preto =

Coordinates: 21.162172°S 47.853066°W

Hospital das Clínicas da Faculdade de Medicina de Ribeirão Preto
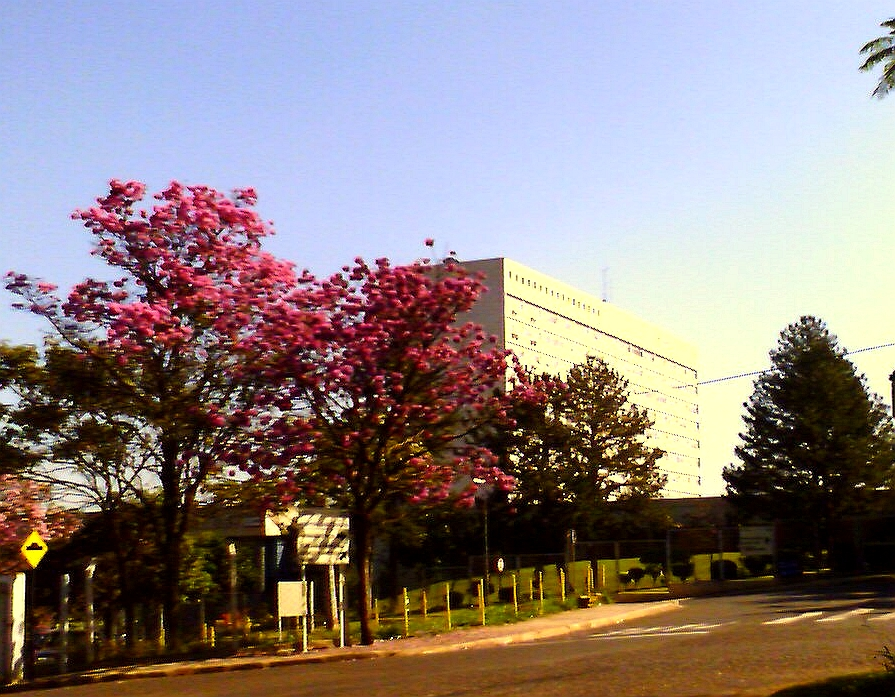
- A view of the main building.

Geography
- Location: Ribeirão Preto, Ribeirão Preto, SP, Brazil

Organisation
- Care system: Public
- Type: Teaching, tertiary referral hospital
- Affiliated university: University of São Paulo

Services
- Emergency department: HCUE - Hospital das Clínicas Unidade de Emergência (Faculdade de Medicina de Ribeirão Preto)
- Beds: +700

History
- Opened: 1952

Links
- Website: www.hcrp.fmrp.usp.br
- Lists: Hospitals in Brazil

The Hospital das Clínicas de Ribeirão Preto (Clinics Hospital of Ribeirão Preto of the University of São Paulo, in Portuguese language) is a teaching hospital (Portuguese, Hospital das Clínicas) located in the city of Ribeirão Preto, state of São Paulo, Brazil. It is affiliated with the Medical School of Ribeirão Preto.

The largest public hospital in the region, it serves a population of around 2.5 million people. It is a tertiary hospital, with all the medical specialties and medico-surgical services represented. It offers a total of more than 500 beds.

== History ==
When the Medical School was established in 1952, the local obstetrical hospital, Maternidade Sinhá Junqueira de Ribeirão Preto, located downtown, was adapted as the school's teaching hospital for the clinical semesters. Around 1970, the State government started to build a new hospital on the university's suburban campus at the former Monte Alegre coffee farm, but financial difficulties postponed finishing it until 1978.
