= Federal University of Health Sciences of Porto Alegre =

University in Porto Alegre, Brazil

Coordinates: 30.031576°S 51.220472°W

- Universidade Federal de Ciências da Saúde de Porto Alegre
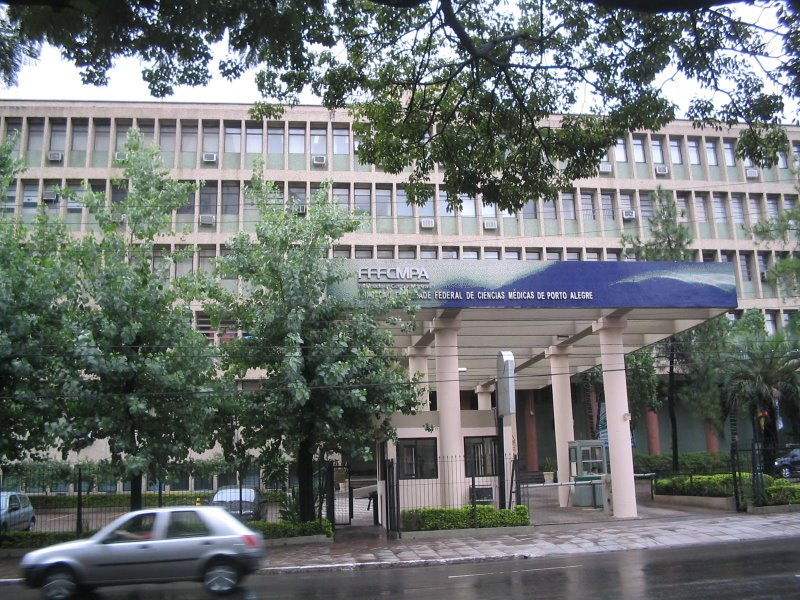
- Other names: UFCSPA
- Former names: Fundação Faculdade Federal de Ciências Médicas de Porto Alegre; Faculdade Católica de Medicina de Porto Alegre
- Type: Public
- Established: 1953
- Endowment: R$ 43.518 million
- Rector: Lúcia Pellanda
- Administrative staff: 287
- Undergraduates: 1067
- Postgraduates: 396
- Location: Porto Alegre, Rio Grande do Sul, Brazil
- Campus: Urban
- Website: www.ufcspa.edu.br

The Federal University of Health Sciences of Porto Alegre (Portuguese: Universidade Federal de Ciências da Saúde de Porto Alegre, UFCSPA) is a federal university of health sciences located in Porto Alegre, Brazil.

== Academics ==
UFCSPA provides 15 degrees: Biomedicine, Medicine, Nursing, Nutrition, Physiotherapy, Psychology, Pharmacy, Toxicology, Gastronomy, Medical Physics, Health Management, Medicinal Chemistry, Biomedical Informatics, Food Technology and Speech therapy.

UFCSPA is linked to Santa Casa de Misericordia Hospital, a major hospital in Latin America.

== Structure ==
The UFCSPA has a main building of 6 floors and the Center for Research and Post-Graduate Professor Heitor Cirne Lima. In its facilities, besides various laboratories, the university has a library (with broadband internet access and terminals for individual and group study), amphitheaters, conference room, art room, cafeteria, restaurant and chapel. It has parking spaces for employees, teachers and students. Currently an enclosed building is being constructed within the university and will house new laboratories and classrooms.

The university has an area of 9,456.84 m^{2}, and the built part is 13,121.09 m^{2}.

== Notable alumni ==
- Ciro de Quadros - physician

== See also ==
- Brazil University Rankings
- Universities and Higher Education in Brazil
- Santa Casa Hospital Porto Alegre
