= Garanhuns cannibals =

Brazilian serial killers and cannibals

- Born: Brazil
- Other name: "The Cartel"
- Conviction: Murder x3
- Penalty: 92 years (Negromonte and Pires); 95 years (Oliveira)

Details
- Victims: 3–8 (jointly); 3–9 (Negromonte)
- Span of crimes: 2008–2012
- Country: Brazil
- State: Pernambuco
- Date apprehended: April 9, 2012

The Garanhuns Cannibals (Portuguese: Canibais de Garanhuns) refers to a trio of Brazilian serial killers and cannibals who were convicted of murdering a teenager and two women in Pernambuco from 2008 to 2012. This case gained additional notoriety for the claims that the perpetrators consumed the victims' flesh and even sold under the guise of salted dishes to random passers-by.

== Early life ==
=== Jorge Beltrão Negromonte da Silveira ===
Born on December 14, 1961 to Portuguese immigrants from Coimbra, Negromonte spent his early life in Portugal before returning to live in Pernambuco. While he was a teenager, he killed a 17-year-old named Luciano Severino da Silva, but was acquitted of murder charges due to a lack of evidence. He later attempted to kill his elderly mother and stole R$80,000, with which he bought himself a house.

=== Isabel Cristina Torreão Pires da Silveira ===
Born on May 12, 1961 into an impoverished Mormon family which could not afford tuition, Pires, known as "Bel", spent most of her childhood doing chores around the house. While attending the local Mormon church, she fell in love with Negromonte, with the pair deciding to get married in 1984. At the wedding reception, he had a fit and threatened to kill all the guests with a knife, forcing the couple to isolate themselves from others.

=== Bruna Cristina Oliveira da Silva ===
Born on September 29, 1986 in Natal, the 16-year-old Oliveira met Negromonte at a gym, where he was a teacher. The pair fell in love, but as he was already married, Negromonte and Pires accepted the proposal to form a love triangle between them.

=== Formation ===
At one point, Negromonte formed a sect called "The Cartel" (Portuguese: O Cartel), which aimed to "purify" the world and protect the Earth from overpopulation. As part of the purification process, the sect had to consume human flesh and kill four victims in correspondence to the four natural elements: air, earth, water and fire. According to Negromonte, who supposedly received commands from an angel and a cherub, after successfully completing this task, a "portal to paradise" would be opened and they could all ascend to the next plane of existence.

== Murders ==
On May 26, 2008, the Cartel members invited 17-year-old Jéssica Camila da Silva Pereira to their house in Olinda. At the time, she was homeless and accompanied by her 1-year-old daughter. When she was not paying attention, Da Silva was struck on the head and dragged to the bathroom, where her jugular vein was cut with a knife. After removing all of her blood with the help of a tourniquet, the sectarians dismembered her body and skinned her, slicing up the meat and storing it in a refrigerator. On the next day, it was seasoned with salt and cumin, grilled, and subsequently eaten. Da Silva's daughter was also given some of the flesh. The other remains were buried in the form of a cross in the backyard, while other body fragments were thrown into the trash. The trio then moved to the city of Conde, Paraíba and later to the Pernambuco cities of Jaboatão dos Guararapes and Gravatá, taking along Da Silva's daughter with them.

By early 2012, Negromonte and his accomplices had moved to the Jardim Petrópolis neighborhood in Garanhuns, where they soon resumed their crimes. In February of that year, they abducted and killed 31-year-old Giselly Helena da Silva, followed shortly afterwards by 20-year-old Alexandra da Silva Falcão on March 15. The meat of both women, possibly from the buttocks or thighs, was used to make savory snacks such as pies, which were then sold to locals. According to interviews conducted by reports for G1, some residents who had eaten the snacks claimed that they tasted normal, while others claimed that the patty was too salty or doughy.

== Arrest ==
Shortly after the disappearance of Giselly da Silva, her family reported the case to the police, who began an investigation. They had no viable leads until mid-March, when Da Silva's family members received a credit card bill indicating several purchases in Garanhuns. Officers were then dispatched to the stores where the purchases had occurred and looked through the security footage, allowing them to identify Negromonte, Pires and Oliveira.

On April 9, 2012, arrest and seizure warrants were issued for the trio, as there was a suspicion that Da Silva and Falcão were inside their residence. The trio was arrested on the scene and Jéssica da Silva's 5-year-old daughter, who was still with them, told one of the officers that her 'father' had killed the two women, describing the crime scene in detail. Shortly afterwards, one of the suspects admitted responsibility for the crimes and pointed out where the women had been buried. Upon exhuming them, authorities found that the victims' remains had been dismembered and that Da Silva's face had been severely disfigured.

A day later, the house was vandalized and then set on fire by outraged residents, but this did not interfere with the investigators' work. Some investigation also led to the location of the child's birth certificate, which led to her being placed under the care of the Guardianship Council. Da Silva's remains were eventually recovered by authorities and positively identified with the help of DNA.

== Trial and imprisonment ==
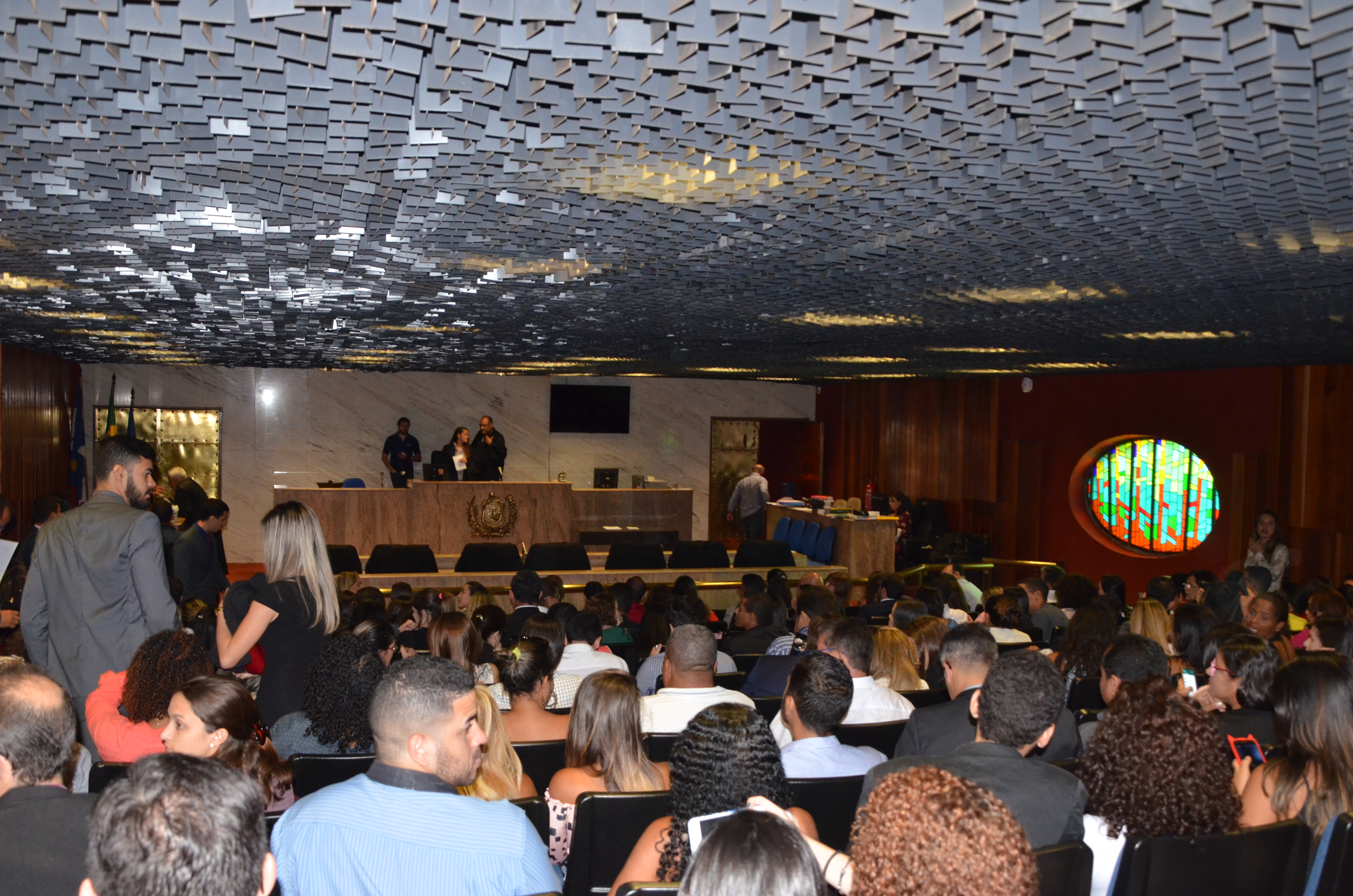
Trial proceedings (2018)

On November 14, 2014, the trio were convicted of killing Jéssica da Silva by jury verdict – Negromonte was sentenced to 21 years and six months imprisonment, with an additional year and six months in solitary confinement, while Pires and Oliveira received 19 years imprisonment and a year of solitary confinement. The trio were jointly put on trial for the other two deaths on December 15, 2018, and were again found guilty on all counts – Negromonte was sentenced to 71 years; Oliveira to 71 years and 10 months, and Pires to 68 years.

In 2019, the trial court ordered that the trio's sentences for the first murder be increased. As a result, Negromonte's sentence was increased to 27 years imprisonment and a year-and-a-half of solitary confinement, while Pires and Oliveira's sentences were increased to 24 years.

=== Revelations of a Schizophrenic ===
After being diagnosed as a schizophrenic, Negromonte was placed in psychiatric care, where he remains to this day. With the help of hospital staff, he wrote a book titled Revelations of a Schizophrenic (Portuguese: Revelações de um Esquizofrênico), consisting of 34 short chapters describing in detail events from early on in his life up until his incarceration. In addition to this, he has written three other books and now claims to be an ovo-lacto vegetarian.

== See also ==
- Rua do Arvoredo murders
- List of incidents of cannibalism
- List of serial killers in Brazil
