= Hospital Daher =

Daher Lake South Hospital Hospital Daher Lago Sul
- Daher Hospital; Hospital Daher
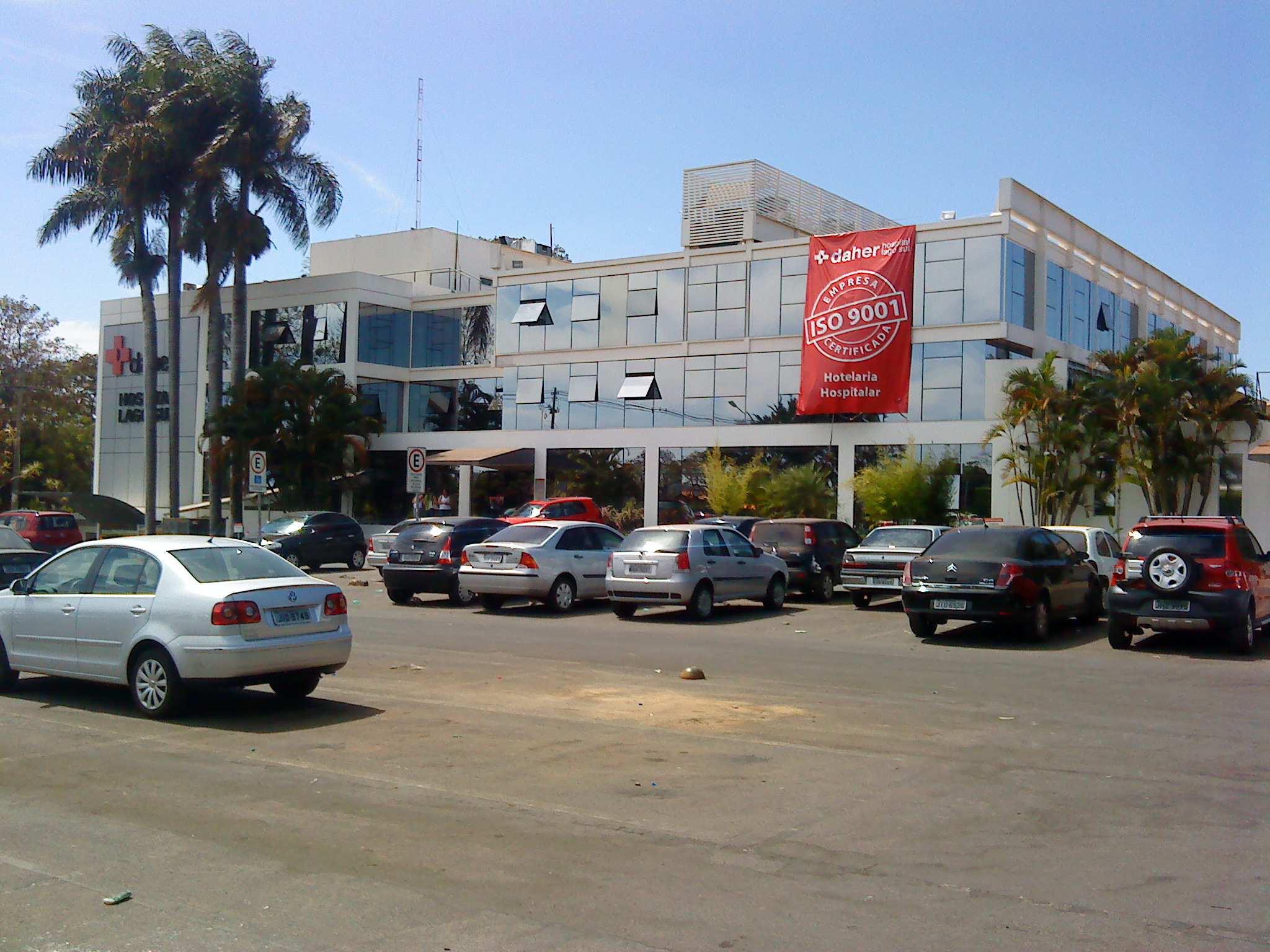
- The Hospital Daher

Geography
- Location: Lago Sul, DF, Brazil, Brazil
- Coordinates: 15.841609°S 47.885536°W

Organisation
- Type: General
- Patron: Dr. José Carlos Daher

History
- Founded: 1978

Links
- Website: www.hospitaldaher.com.br
- Lists: Hospitals in Brazil

The Daher Lake South Hospital (Portuguese: Hospital Daher Lago Sul) is a privately owned brazilian hospital, located in the administrative region of Lago Sul, in the Federal District. It was founded by Dr. José Carlos Daher, plastic surgeon, in 1978.
