= Nosso Senhor dos Passos Chapel =

Chapel in Porto Alegre, Brazil

- Capela Nosso Senhor dos Passos
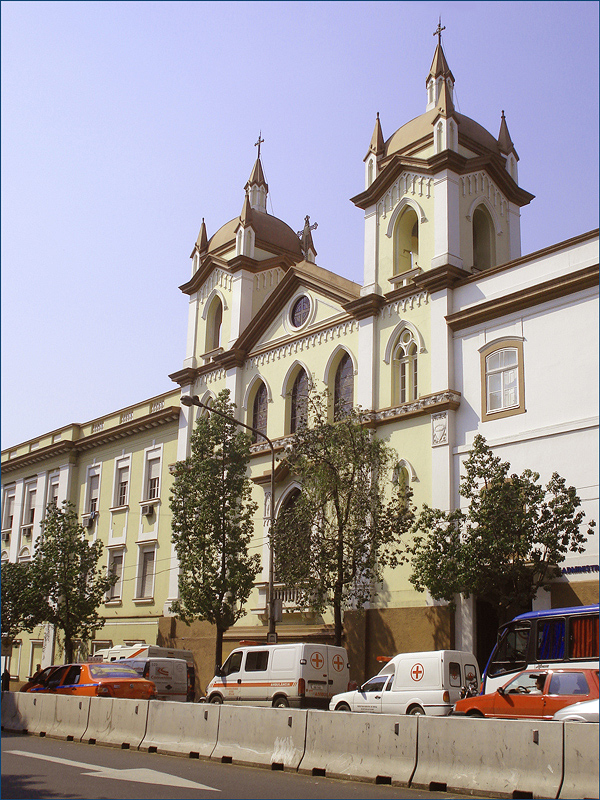
- Nosso Senhor dos Passos Chapel
- 30°01′49″S 51°13′21″W
- Location: Porto Alegre, Brazil
- Denomination: Catholic

The Nosso Senhor dos Passos Chapel is a Catholic temple located in the Brazilian city of Porto Alegre, part of the Santa Casa de Misericórdia building complex. It has been included in the city's historical heritage.

== History ==
The Santa Casa was founded in 1803, and it took a long time to build a temple to care for the sick within it. The 1st Book of Resolutions of the Brotherhood of the Santa Casa da Misericórdia, in its first entry, dated January 24, 1814, reports the existence of an image of Senhor dos Passos (Our Lord of the Stations of the Cross) owned by the institution of the same name, administered by the Brotherhood of the Blessed Sacrament, and the need to establish a chapel or church in the Public Hospital of the Mercy, where the Blessed Sacrament would be kept so that it could be ministered to the sick by the Brothers of Mercy, and requested funds for this establishment and for the transfer of the image.

The next document, dated July 11, 1814, pointed out the need to elect a new Provider and to expand the organization in order to raise alms. It also recommended merging the Brotherhood with the Institution, whose image was now in the sacristy of the Porto Alegre parish church, stating that it could serve as Patron Saint for the Hospital, since the image was already attracting enough alms for the chapel to be built.

The request was granted on July 26 of the same year, signed by Dom Diogo de Souza, governor of the Captaincy of São Pedro do Rio Grande, and recorded in the Book of Records of the Capital's City Council on December 14, 1814. Construction seems to have been hindered, as a new request for construction was made to the governor in 1818, finally beginning in 1819, during the office of Judge Luiz Corrêa Teixeira de Bragança. In 1825, the nave and altar of the chapel were inaugurated, and the image of Senhor dos Passos, which had been in the parish church since 1808, was enthroned.

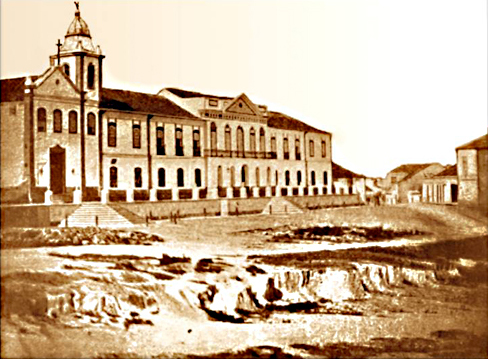
Aspect of the Santa Casa and the chapel around 1850

The first chapel lasted until 1858, when it was demolished to make way for a new building. A larger high altar and carved wood decoration were created between 1866 and 1868 by master carpenter João do Couto e Silva. He also designed a consistory and a balustrade. At this time, the chapel received new furnishings and the images of the Crucified Lord, Our Lady of Solitude and Saint Mary Magdalene, bought in Bahia by Lopo Gonçalves Bastos. Between 1873 and 1881, during the office of José Antônio Coelho Júnior, the chapel underwent conservation and repair work which included renovating the chancel, decorating the altars, flooring the nave, replacing doors, installing two tribunes, protecting the choir with iron railings and buying a small carillon of three bells. An organ was also installed.

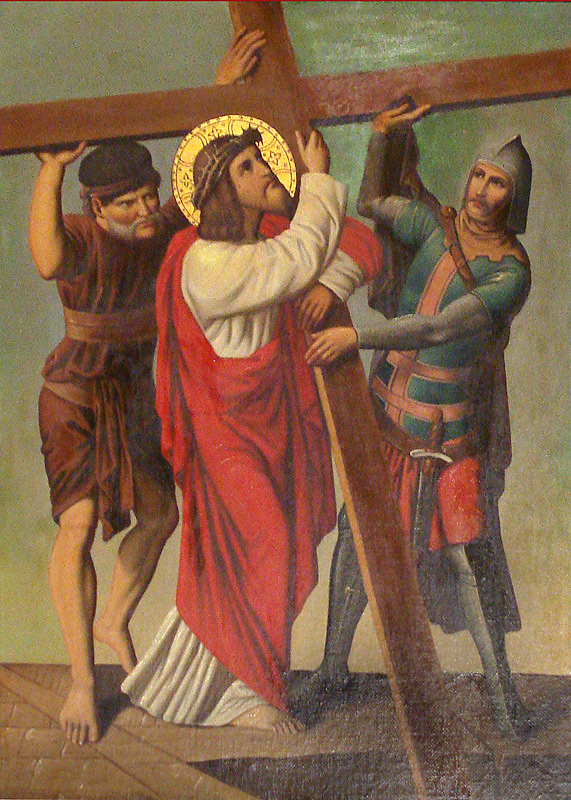
One of the panels of the Way of the Cross

At the end of the 1880s, the church was repainted, a lightning rod was installed in the tower, the pews and torch holders were gilded, gas was installed, the lighting was changed, the paintings were decorated and retouched, the altar of Our Lady of Solitude and the two sacristies were wallpapered, the ornaments were restored, decorations were purchased, and the transept arch was carpeted. The renovations continued at the beginning of the following decade, with the decoration of the images of Our Lord of the Stations of the Cross and Our Lady of Mercy and the enthronement of the relics of four martyrs. A painted Way of the Cross was commissioned in Europe in 1897 and installed in 1903.

On June 29, 1909, the Jornal do Commercio announced that "soon modern architecture will come to sing the almost secular song of the psalmody of Friar Joaquim do Livramento", in a reference to the founder of the Santa Casa and the transformation in the style of the building. A commemorative plaque inside the Santa Casa, dated 1911, when it was reopened, states that the Provider, Lieutenant Colonel Antônio Soares de Barcelos, had ordered the temple to be almost completely rebuilt between 1909 and 1910, with Victor Ferlini and Hugo Ferlini as architect and foreman. Although there are no records of the exact nature and extent of this renovation in terms of the interior, it certainly produced a major change to the façade, which was remodeled in the neo-gothic style.

Between the 1930s and 1940s, furniture was added and in 1936 bells were installed in the towers, dedicated to Our Lady of Glory and Saint Francis of Assisi. In the 1940s, a new major renovation removed the access staircase due to a change in the urbanization of the street in front, its entrance was moved to the side of the building, and the entrance door was then closed and replaced by a large stained glass window produced by the artist Judith Fortes in partnership with Casa Genta. At the beginning of the 1960s, a new renovation of the interior included ornaments painted by Emilio Sessa.

In 1977 the chapel was included by the City Council in the Inventory of Properties of Historical and Cultural Value and of Significant Tradition. In 2004 the chapel was restored. In 2019, it celebrated its 200th anniversary with a Latin Mass, a recital of sacred music and a guided tour. The same year, a project was launched to restore the stained glass windows.

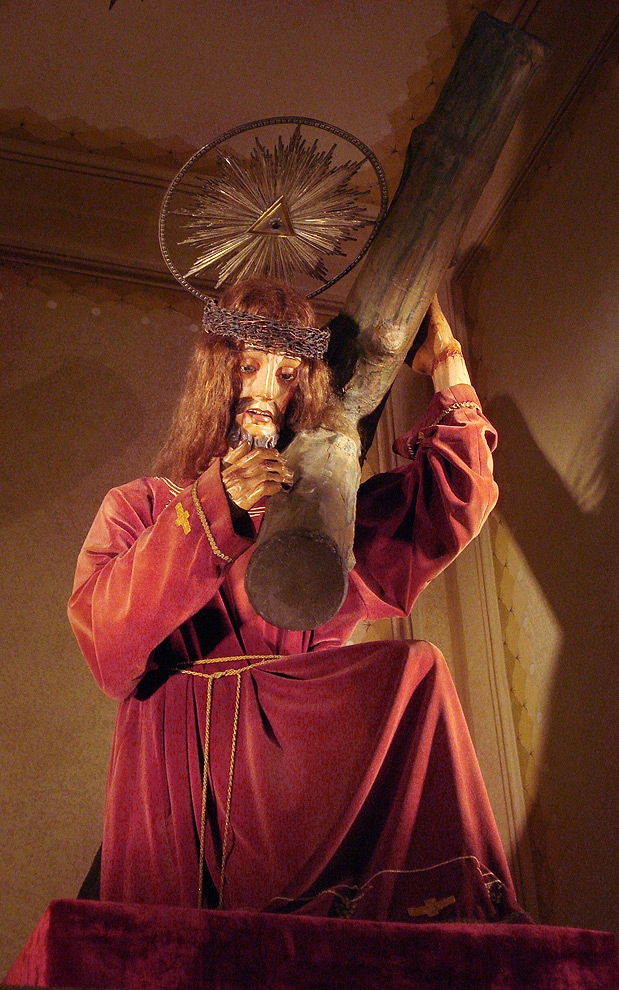
Image of the patron saint, the Lord of the Stations of the Cross, on the main altar

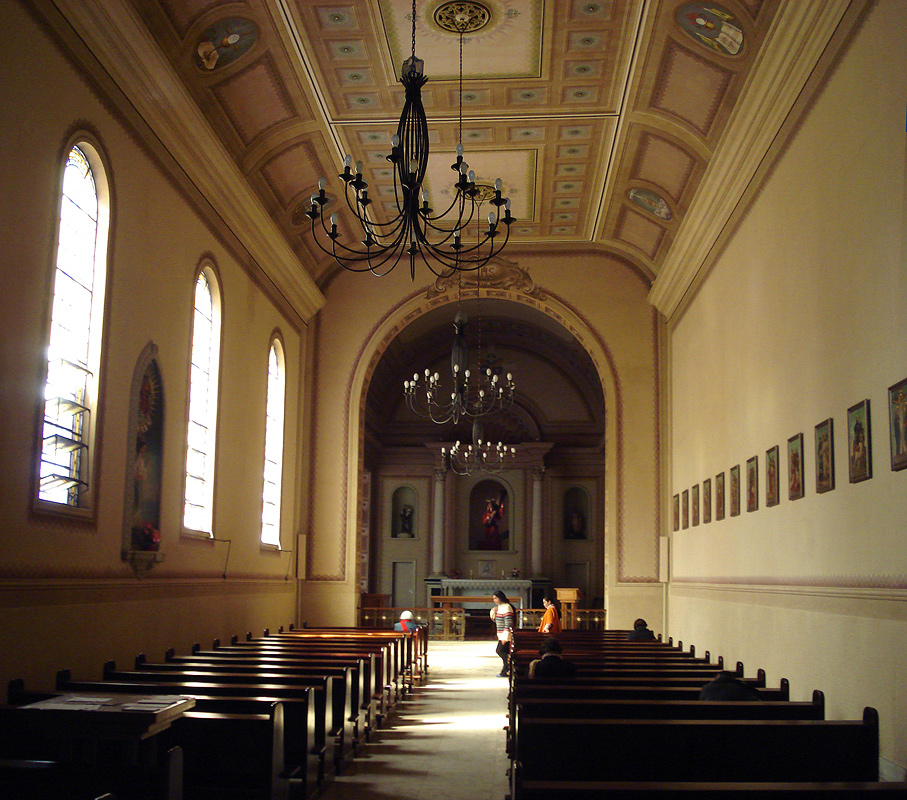
Nave and chancel

A total of seven openings are decorated with stained glass windows, produced by Casa Genta of Porto Alegre, with designs by Maximilian Dobmeier and Judith Fortes. Five of them are figurative, with scenes of Our Lord of the Stations of the Cross, the Crucifixion, the Deposition from the cross, the Three Women at the tomb and the Ascension of Christ.

== See also ==
- History of Porto Alegre
- Architecture of Porto Alegre
- Santa Casa de Misericordia Hospital
