= Jornal de Pediatria (Rio de Janeiro) =

Brazilian medical journal

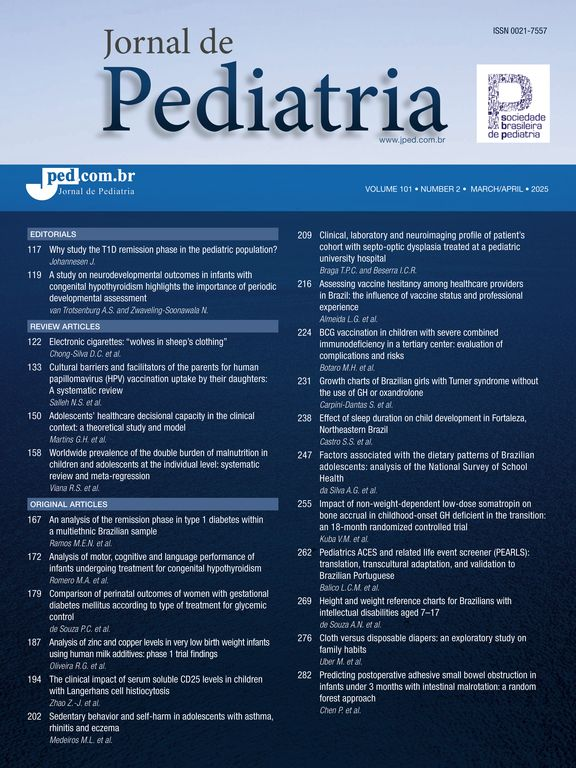
- Discipline: Pediatrics
- Language: English
- Edited by: Renato Procianoy

Publication details
- History: 1934–present
- Publisher: Brazilian Society of Pediatrics, published by Elsevier (Brazil)
- Frequency: Bimonthly
- Open access: Yes
- Impact factor: 2.8 (2023)

Standard abbreviations
- ISO 4: J. Pediatr. (Rio J.)

Indexing
- ISSN: 0021-7557 (print); 1678-4782 (web)

Links
- Journal homepage; Online access (SciELO)

The Jornal de Pediatria (English: Journal of Pediatrics) is a peer-reviewed scientific journal covering the field of pediatrics. It is published bimonthly by the Brazilian Society of Pediatrics (Sociedade Brasileira de Pediatria, SBP), with editorial management by Elsevier. The journal was established in 1934 and is one of the most traditional and influential pediatric journals in Latin America.

== History ==
Since its founding in 1934, the Jornal de Pediatria has published clinical, public health, and scientific research focused on child and adolescent health. Since 2002, the editor-in-chief has been professor Renato Procianoy from the Federal University of Rio Grande do Sul (UFRGS).

== Scope ==
The journal publishes original research articles, systematic reviews, brief communications, and editorials covering a wide range of pediatric topics, such as clinical medicine, epidemiology, infectious diseases, nutrition, child development, and public health.

== Open access ==
The Jornal de Pediatria follows an open access policy. All articles are available free of charge, and there is no fee for submission. However, an article processing charge (APC) applies upon acceptance.

== Abstracting and indexing ==
The journal is indexed in the following databases:

- PubMed
- MEDLINE
- Scopus
- Web of Science
- SciELO
- EMBASE
- LILACS
- DOAJ

== Bibliometric indicators ==
According to 2023 data:

- Journal Impact Factor (JCR): 2.8
- CiteScore (Scopus): 5.6
- SJR: 0.76
- SNIP: 1.086
