= Zeisel =

Zeisel is a surname. Notable people with the surname include:

- Eva Zeisel (1906–2011), Hungarian-born American industrial designer
- Hans Zeisel (1905–1992), American sociologist and legal scholar
- Steven Zeisel, medical academic
- Yeruham Zeisel (1909–1987), Israeli politician
