= Institute of Cancer of São Paulo =

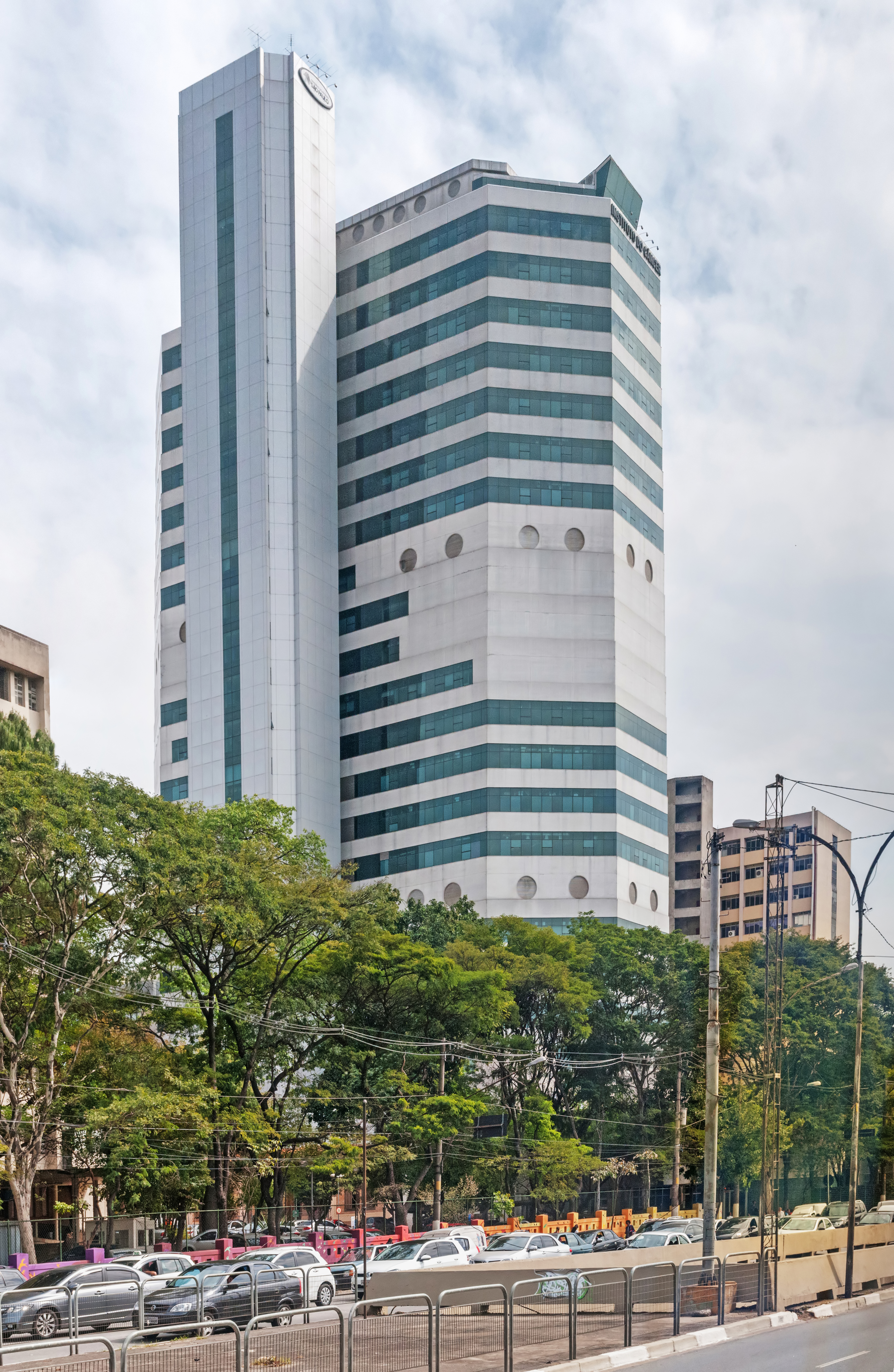
- Institute of Cancer of São Paulo

Geography
- Location: São Paulo, Brazil
- Coordinates: 23.555821°S 46.668147°W

Organisation
- Type: Specialist

Services
- Beds: 580
- Speciality: Oncology

History
- Opened: 2008

Links
- Lists: Hospitals in Brazil

Institute of Cancer of São Paulo or Hospital do Câncer de São Paulo is located in the city of São Paulo, Brazil. Is the largest hospital of cancer of Brazil and Latin America. Founded in 2008, the institute has 580 beds, 19 elevators (18 persons each), 31 floors, 120 medical consulting rooms, 1.3 thousand surgeries/month, 6 thousand sessions of chemotherapy/month, 420 sessions of radiotherapy/month.
