= Santa Casa de Misericordia Hospital =

Santa Casa de Porto Alegre
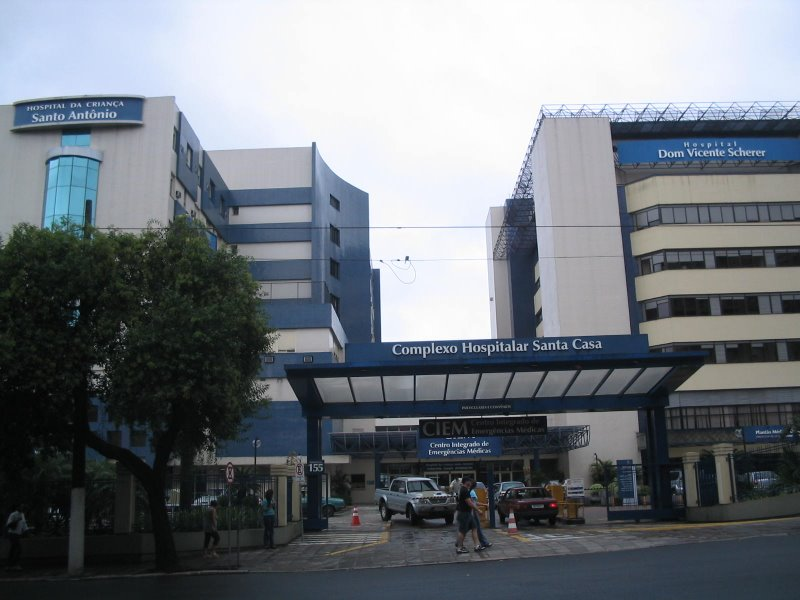
- Santa Casa de Porto Alegre

Geography
- Location: Porto Alegre, Brazil
- Coordinates: 30.0305°S 51.2222°W

Organisation
- Type: Teaching
- Affiliated university: Federal University of Health Sciences of Porto Alegre

History
- Constructed: 1803

Links
- Lists: Hospitals in Brazil

Santa Casa de Porto Alegre is a major hospital based in Porto Alegre, Brazil. It's considered one of the references in Latin America for transplants and genetic research.

Founded in 1803. Since 1961, it is the university hospital linked to the Federal University of Health Sciences of Porto Alegre.

== See also ==
- Universities and Higher Education in Brazil
- Nosso Senhor dos Passos Chapel
