= Albert Einstein Israelite Hospital =

Hospital in São Paulo, Brazil

- Sociedade Beneficente Israelita Brasileira Albert Einstein (SBIBAE)

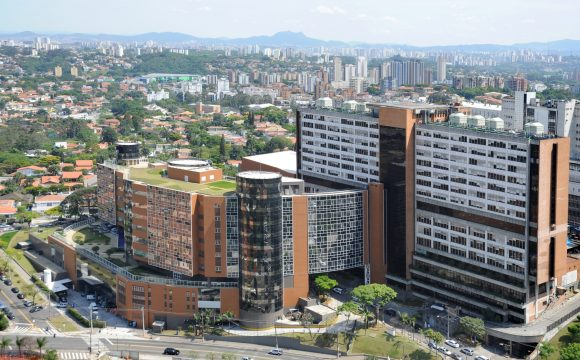

Geography
- Location: Morumbi, São Paulo, SP, Brazil
- Coordinates: 23°36′00″S 46°42′55″W

History
- Founded: 28 July 1971; 55 years ago

Links
- Website: www.einstein.br
- Lists: Hospitals in Brazil

The Albert Einstein Israelite Hospital (Portuguese: Hospital Israelita Albert Einstein) is a Brazilian private hospital, located in the Morumbi district, on the south side of São Paulo. It is considered the best hospital in Latin America. In 2024, it was ranked among the top 30 best hospitals in the world by a Newsweek survey of specialists and patients. Although a private hospital the institution is based on a charitable foundation and also attends patients through the Brazilian public health system - SUS.

== History ==
A group of Jewish community members in São Paulo founded the Sociedade Beneficente Israelita Brasileira Albert Einstein (SBIBAE) in 1955. The SBIBAE began construction of the Albert Einstein Hospital three years later on 14 September 1958 on land donated by Ema Gordon Klabin. The hospital was inaugurated on 28 July 1971.

In 1999, it was the first health institution outside the United States to be certified by the Joint Commission International.

Ophthalmologist Dr. Cláudio Lottenberg began as president of the Albert Einstein in December 2001.

On 29 December 2022 at 3:27 PM (GMT-3), footballer Pelé died after receiving treatment for cancer in this hospital.

Silvio Santos died there on 17 August 2024 from bronchopneumonia, a complication provoked by H1N1. He was 93.

Juan Izquierdo died there on 27 August 2024 due to cardiac arrhythmia. He was 27.

== Care and programs ==
It is one of the most well-known health units in Brazil due to the quality of care, medical equipment and expertise at its disposal to address the main types of pathologies. It has a social assistance program in the Paraisópolis favela, near the hospital.

The Albert Einstein also hosts a nursing school as well as a medical school (since 2016). As of 2022, a new undergraduate degree in business administration with an emphasis in health organization management will be inaugurated.

== See also ==
- List of hospitals in Brazil
- History of the Jews in Brazil
