= Steven Zeisel =

American medical academic

Steven H. Zeisel is an American academic. He is Professor Emeritus in Nutrition and Pediatrics at the University of North Carolina at Chapel Hill.

== Education ==
Zeisel earned his M.D. from Harvard Medical School in 1975, was a resident in pediatrics at Yale University from 1975 to 1977, and earned his Ph.D. in nutrition at the Massachusetts Institute of Technology in 1980.

== Career ==
Zeisel is the Kenan Distinguished University Professor in the Department of Nutrition in the Gillings School of Global Public Health at the University of North Carolina at Chapel Hill. He is also the Director of the UNC's Nutrition Research Institute at the newly formed North Carolina Research Campus in Kannapolis, North Carolina and the UNC Nutrition Obesity Research Center.

He served as chair of the Department of Nutrition at the University of North Carolina at Chapel Hill from 1990 to 2005. He was also the director UNC Human Clinical Nutrition Research Center and the director UNC Center for Excellence in Children's Nutrition at the School of Public Health at the University of North Carolina at Chapel Hill.

He is currently a member of the American Society for Nutrition, the American Society for Parenteral and Enteral Nutrition, the American College of Nutrition and the Society for Pediatric Research, among others.

He has served on the Annual Review of Nutrition's editorial committee and continues to serve on the FASEB Journal editorial board. Zeisel is a member of the World Cancer Research Fund's Expert Panel on “Food, Nutrition and the Prevention of Cancer: A Global Perspective.” He serves as the principal investigator on multiple federally funded research projects that focus on human requirements for choline and the effects of this nutrient on brain development. He has authored more than 280 scientific publications.

He has been criticized for accepting funding from the Egg Board for his studies of choline, a nutrient that eggs contain high amounts of.

== Selected publications ==
- Zeisel, Steven H; Da Costa, Kerry-Ann; Franklin, Peter D; Alexander, Edward A; Lamont, J. Thomas; Sheard, Nancy F; Beiser, Alexa (April 1991), "Choline, an essential nutrient for humans", The FASEB Journal, 5 (7): 2093–2098, doi:10.1096/fasebj.5.7.2010061, PMID 2010061, S2CID 12393618
- Gossell-Williams M, Fletcher H, McFarlane-Anderson N, Jacob A, Patel J, Zeisel S (December 2005). "Dietary intake of choline and plasma choline concentrations in pregnant women in Jamaica". The West Indian Medical Journal. 54 (6): 355–9. doi:10.1590/s0043-31442005000600002 (inactive 7 November 2026). PMC 2438604. PMID 16642650.
- Adams KM; Lindell KC; Kohlmeier M; Zeisel SH (April 2006). "Status of nutrition education in medical schools". Am. J. Clin. Nutr. 83 (4): 941S–4S. doi:10.1093/ajcn/83.4.941S. PMC 2430660. PMID 16600952.
- Xu X; Gammon MD; Zeisel SH; et al. (2008). "Choline metabolism and risk of breast cancer in a population-based study". FASEB J. 22 (6): 2045–52. doi:10.1096/fj.07-101279. PMC 2430758. PMID 18230680.
- Bidulescu A, Chambless LE, Siega-Riz AM, Zeisel SH, Heiss G (2009). "Repeatability and measurement error in the assessment of choline and betaine dietary intake: the Atherosclerosis Risk in Communities (ARIC) study". Nutrition Journal. 8 14. doi:10.1186/1475-2891-8-14. PMC 2654540. PMID 19232103.
- Xu X, Gammon MD, Zeisel SH, et al. (November 2009). "High intakes of choline and betaine reduce breast cancer mortality in a population-based study". The FASEB Journal. 23 (11): 4022–8. doi:10.1096/fj.09-136507. PMC 2775010. PMID 19635752.
- Zeisel SH; da Costa KA (November 2009). "Choline: an essential nutrient for public health". Nutrition Reviews. 67 (11): 615–23. doi:10.1111/j.1753-4887.2009.00246.x. PMC 2782876. PMID 19906248.
- Lee JE, Giovannucci E, Fuchs CS, Willett WC, Zeisel SH, Cho E (March 2010). "Choline and betaine intake and the risk of colorectal cancer in men". Cancer Epidemiology, Biomarkers & Prevention. 19 (3): 884–7. doi:10.1158/1055-9965.EPI-09-1295. PMC 2882060. PMID 20160273.
