= Mila Zeiger =

Mila Zeiger (Emilja Liberman)
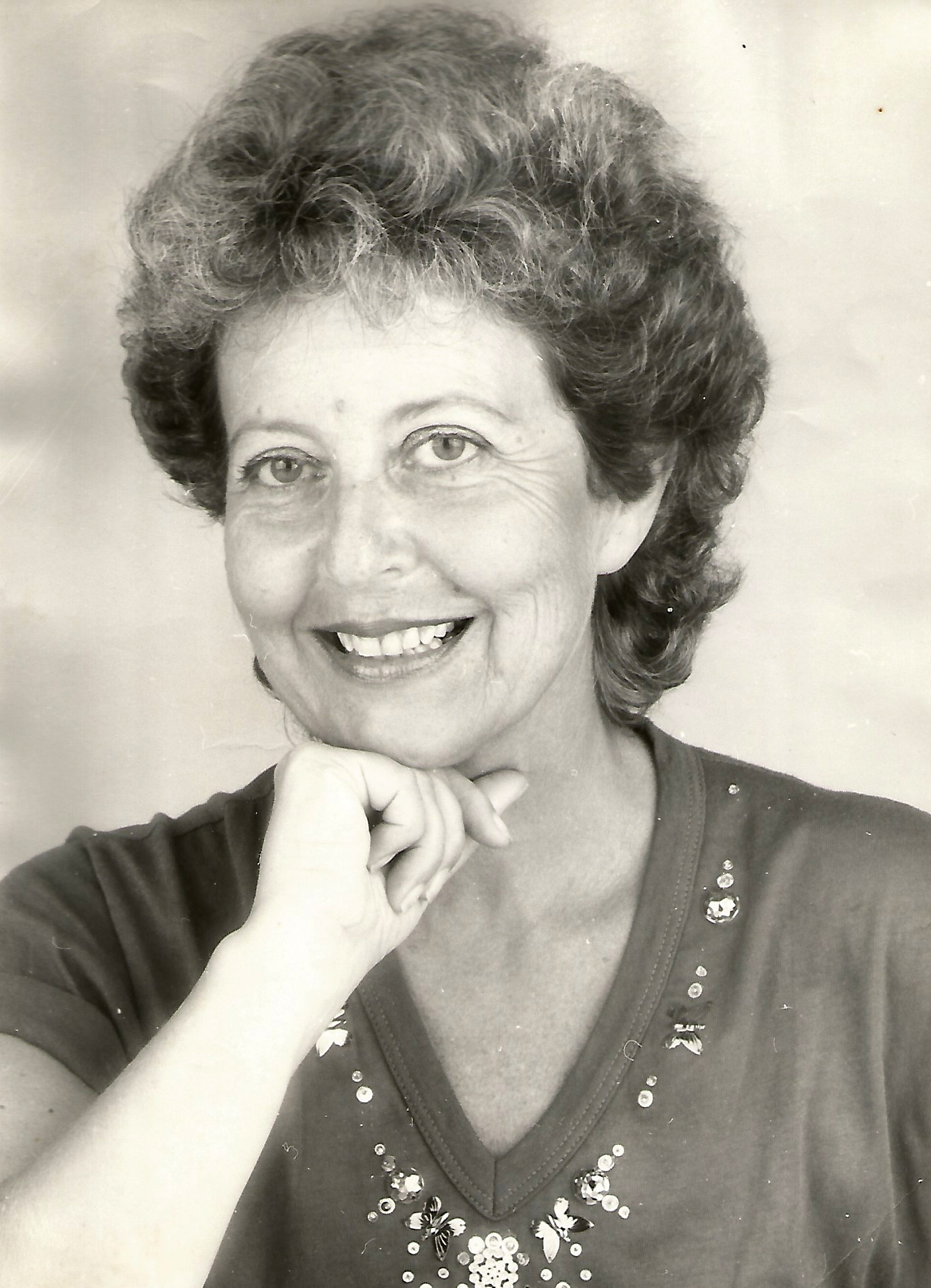
- Born: 6 February 1929; Warsaw, Poland
- Died: 13 September 2016 (aged 87); São Paulo, Brazil
- Occupations: Fashion businesswoman, Socialite
- Spouse(s): David Zeiger (m. 1949–1981); David Erlich (m. 1986–2011)
- Children: Sergio Zeiger, Claudio Zeiger, Eduardo Zeiger e Celia Zeiger

Mila Zeiger (born Emilja Liberman; 6 February 1929 – 13 September 2016), a businesswoman in fashion, contributed to the introduction of prêt-à-porter in Brazil. In the 1950s, she founded with her husband, David Zeiger, and her parents, David and Rachel Liberman, the women's sportswear company, Pullsport, where she developed collections based on European and North American design trends for three decades beginning in the 1950s.

Mila and David Zeiger were avid socialites in Brazil, having befriended influential figures of politics, high society and the artistic world.

== Childhood and Youth ==
Mila was raised by her grandparents in Ukraine. At the age of almost five, she was reunited with her parents, David and Rachel Liberman, who lived in Paris. Because staying at her parents' was not possible—as the couple lived in a small studio, which during the day worked as a fashion atelier—Mila was sent to a boarding school for children of Russian immigrants, near Fontainebleau.

At the beginning of World War II, the boarding school was closed, and Mila was invited to stay in Biarritz at the home of the aristocratic couple who had previously founded the boarding school. For two years, she attended the local public school. When the Nazi occupation occurred in Paris, Rachel and David Liberman fled with their 11-year-old daughter to Portugal. They remained in Figueira da Foz, a fishing village, for 6 months, at the end of which the family received a visa to immigrate to Brazil.

The Libermans settled in São Paulo where they reopened their atelier with the same Parisian name of Micheline Sport. Later they opened the clothing store Marie Claire, which became a chain. In São Paulo, Mila was initially sent to the Catholic school, Our Lady of Sion, then transferred to the American Graded School where she completed her high school studies.

== Career ==
At the age of 20, Mila married the businessman David Zeiger, owner of Goomtex, a company that manufactured overcoats and raincoats. In the 1960s, Goomtex was integrated with Pullsport.

At the height of its success, Pullsport produced 40,000 pieces per month, and had five hundred employees in the production area, in addition to a large group of contractor seamstresses.

Mila Zeiger produced a fashion directed to the Brazilian taste in choices of texture, colors, details and cut. Under her tutelage, Pullsport mostly used synthetic fibers and fabrics which had the look and feel of luxury materials, but were more affordable to the local consumer.

== Death ==
After the death of David Zeiger in 1981, the fashion market quickly experienced a transformation in Brazil, and Pullsport suffered setbacks within the model that had initially assured its commercial success. Mila Zeiger—married by this time to the oncologist, David Erlich—liquidated the business in 1988. In the same decade, Mila was infected with hepatitis C during a blood transfusion. The disease progressed, almost taking her life in her early 80's. With the advent of a new medicine, Mila was cured, but she died at age 86 after a fall that resulted in a broken bone and pneumonia. Her death occurred on the day of the scheduled launch of her biography written by author Marleine Cohen, “Mila Zeiger: Impressions of a Lifetime."

== Success ==
In the 70's, Mila and David Zeiger frequented the São Paulo high society, being constantly mentioned in the fashionable social column of Tavares de Miranda. A partnership between Pullsport and Rhodia (the French multinational petrochemical) resulted in a series of highly creative events, which included artists such as Aldemir Martins, Livio Rangan, Zacharias do Rego Monteiro, Tulio Costa, Maria Della Costa, Nara Leão, and supermodel (now actress) Mila Moreira.

Pullsport designed the clothing for the female cast of "Roberto Carlos in Ritmo de Aventura,” and the TV show "Familia Trapo."
