= Hospital de Clínicas de Porto Alegre =

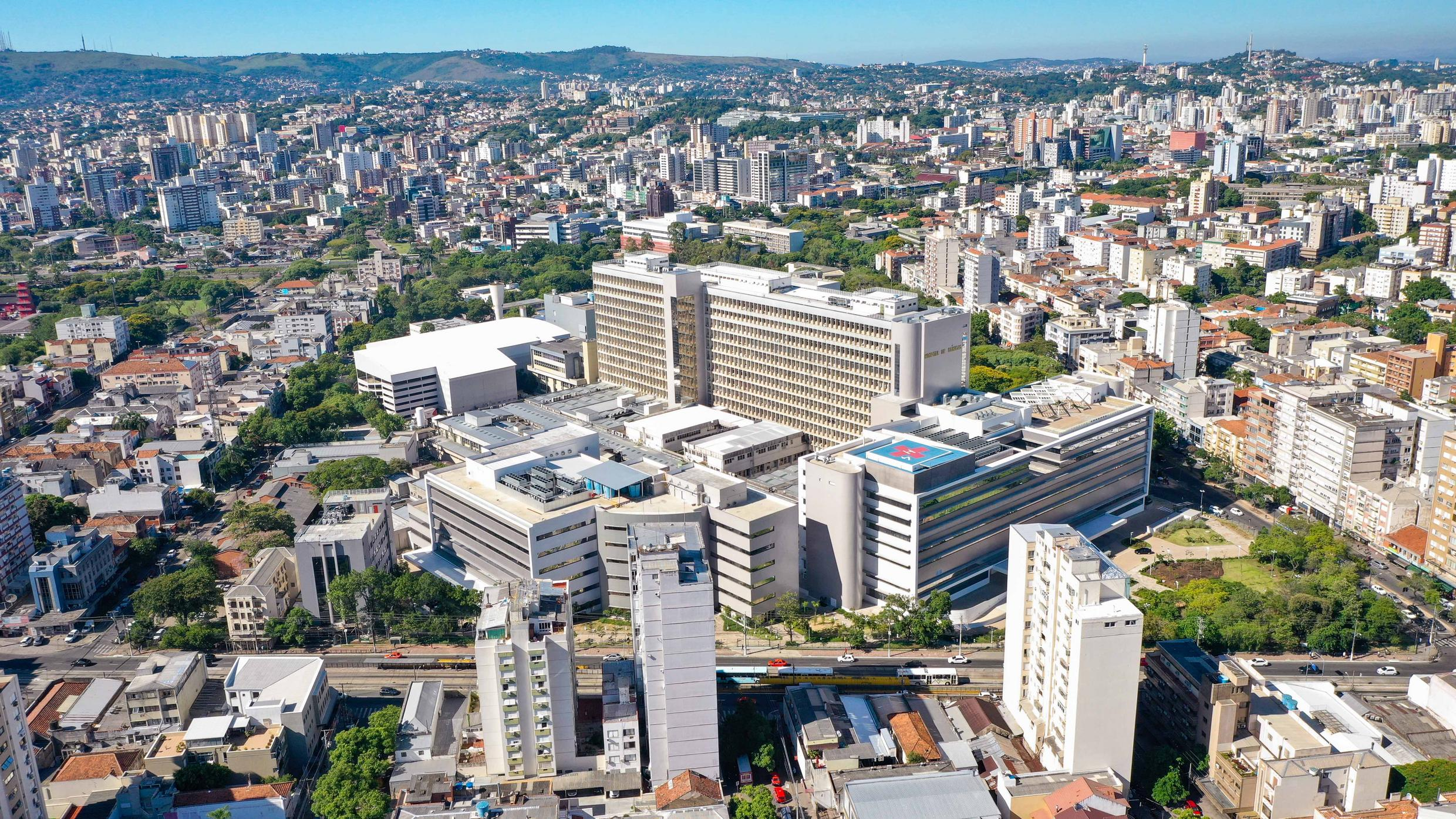
- HCPA Building

Geography
- Location: Porto Alegre, Brazil
- Coordinates: 30.038416°S 51.206658°W

Organisation
- Affiliated university: Federal University of Rio Grande do Sul

Services
- Beds: 741

History
- Opened: 1972

Links
- Lists: Hospitals in Brazil

Hospital de Clínicas de Porto Alegre is a large teaching hospital located in Porto Alegre, Brazil. Affiliated with Federal University of Rio Grande do Sul, it was inaugurated in 1970, gradually becoming a reference for the state of Rio Grande do Sul and southern Brazil. It currently has 125,000 square meters of floor space, distributed on 13 floors, and 741 beds. There is an emergency room with capacity for 50 patients, which contains a vascular unit, an operating theatre with 15 rooms, an outpatient surgery center, and an Interventional Neuro/Cardiovascular center with 3 rooms. It takes care of in about 60 specialties, from the simplest procedures to the most complex, with priority for patients from SUS, Brazil’s free healthcare system.

== History ==
In 1938, the land plot destined for the hospital was bought by the Rio Grande do Sul State Government and was donated to the University two years later. Construction started in 1943, but financial and political problems plagued the work, which went on into the 60s. In 1971 the statute of the hospital was approved, and the following year saw the start of activities.

The first outpatient visit was February 2, 1972 and the first inpatient was admitted on 23 May of the same year (Nephrology).

The first renal transplant occurred in 1974. In 2009, the first lung transplant occurred.

In 2009, the Centro de Pesquisa Clinica (Clinical Research Center) was opened, with 3,000 sq meters of space for research. It will be one of the main centers for the ELSA Project (Longitudinal Study of the Brazilian Population), and also a major center in psychiatric, gynecologic and cardiology research.

== See also ==
- Universities and Higher Education in Brazil
