= List of hospitals in Brazil =

This is a list of hospitals in Brazil. There are around 6,000 hospitals in Brazil, accounting for a total of 302,542 hospital beds, 135,481 of which are in private hospitals. Around 4,400 of Brazil's 6,000 are private, the rest being either Federal, State or Municipal hospitals.

- Hospital das Clínicas da Universidade de São Paulo, São Paulo
- Hospital de Clínicas de Porto Alegre, Porto Alegre
- Hospital Daher, Lago Sul
- Hospital São Paulo, São Paulo
- Hospital Sírio-Libanês, São Paulo
- Hospital Israelita Albert Einstein, São Paulo
- Hospital do Servidor Público Estadual, São Paulo
- Santa Casa de Misericordia Hospital, Porto Alegre
- Hospital Vitória, Rio de Janeiro
- Hospital Samaritano, Rio de Janeiro
- Hospital Barra D´or, Rio de Janeiro
- Hospital Unimed, Rio de Janeiro
- Hospital Rio Mar, Rio de Janeiro
- Hospital São Luiz, São Paulo
- Clínica SEUMED, Maringá
- Hospital Nove de Julho, São Paulo
- Santa Catarina Hospital, São Paulo

== See also ==
- List of hospital ships of the Brazilian Navy
