= Architecture of Porto Alegre =

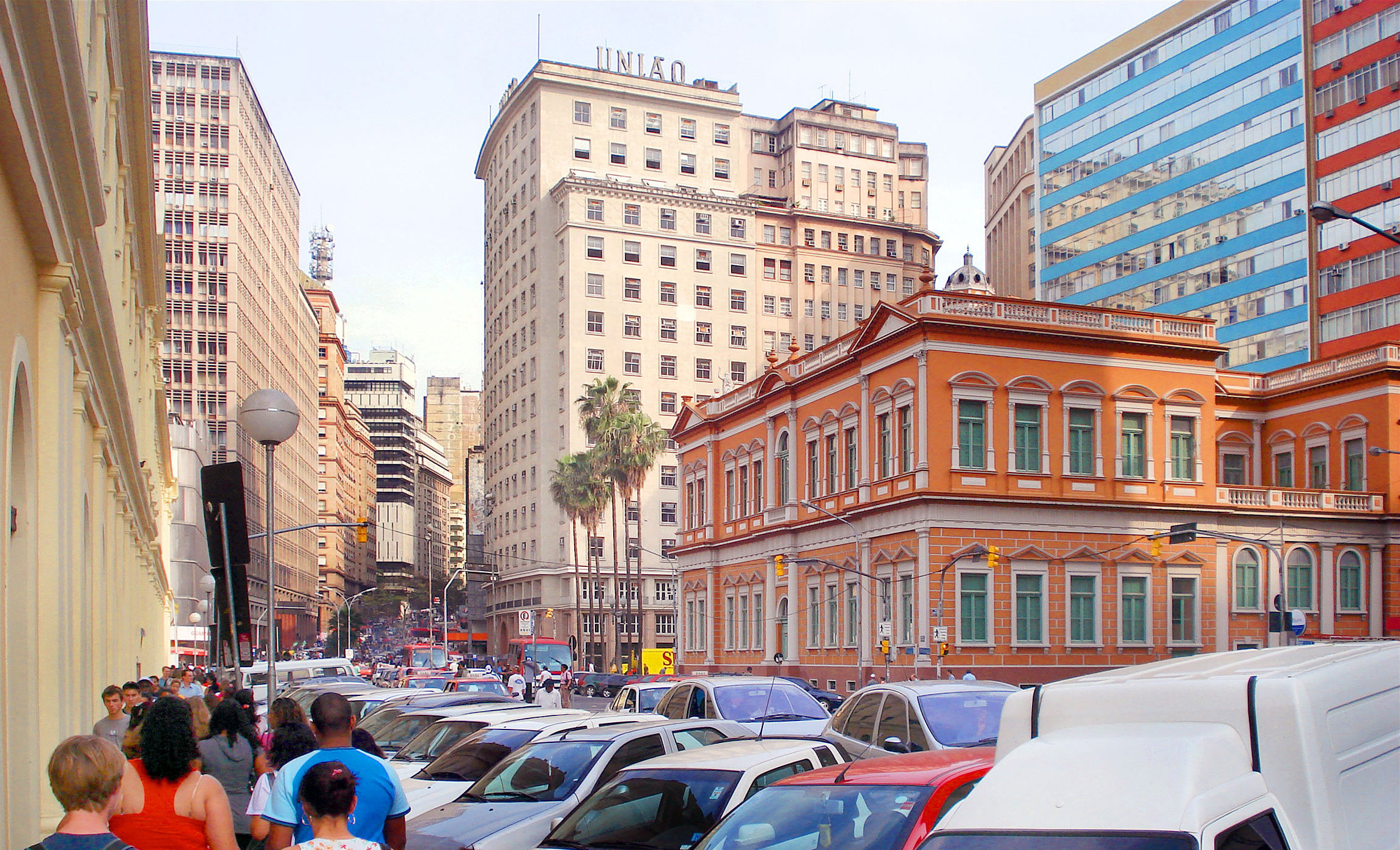
An angle of the historic center of Porto Alegre with examples of some of the main evolutionary phases of the city's architecture.

The architecture of Porto Alegre, the capital of Rio Grande do Sul, Brazil, is a mosaic of ancient and modern styles. This characteristic is most visible in the center of the city, the historic urban center, where examples of eighteenth-century architecture survive amidst nineteenth-century and contemporary buildings.

== Overview ==
The architectural evolution of Porto Alegre does not differ in its general mechanism from most large Brazilian cities, although it has some unique elements. Its condition of provincial capital almost from the beginning resulted in a tendency to expand and monumentalize. Today it is the largest city in the state, the seat of a Metropolitan Region, and one of the largest cities in Brazil. Throughout its history, it has collected an extensive series of monumental buildings, many of extraordinary value, and some advanced urban planning projects, but as a whole, this did not result in a coherent plan nor did it reveal a spirit of long-term planning, having grown vastly in a disorganized and poorly controlled way, with urban plans being very much linked to political and economic oscillations.

The architecture in the city began with the Portuguese colonial style, went through the neoclassical, eclectic, and modernist schools. Porto Alegre verticalized, expanded, merged with neighboring cities, and became a metropolis. Now its architecture is being renewed under the influence of postmodernism and globalization, developing a hybrid and internationalizing style. This has given rise to criticism about the de-characterization of its identity and the extensive destruction of irreplaceable historical architecture in the wave of "progress" and real estate speculation.

Today, the city is reorganizing its urban landscape with major infrastructure works, especially roads, and erecting significant examples of contemporary architecture. At the same time, it faces the challenges of growing into one of Brazil's largest capitals, with almost 1.5 million inhabitants. There is still a large population living in slums and without access to basic services, and dissatisfaction is growing with the directions that the public administration has adopted in the areas of urban planning, popular housing, use of special areas, urban mobility, nature preservation, and others. Urban revitalization projects promoted by the state and municipal governments, such as those of the Mauá Pier, the former Industrial District, and a program of concessions of parks and other public spaces to the private sector, have produced intense controversy.

== The Portuguese Colonial Style ==
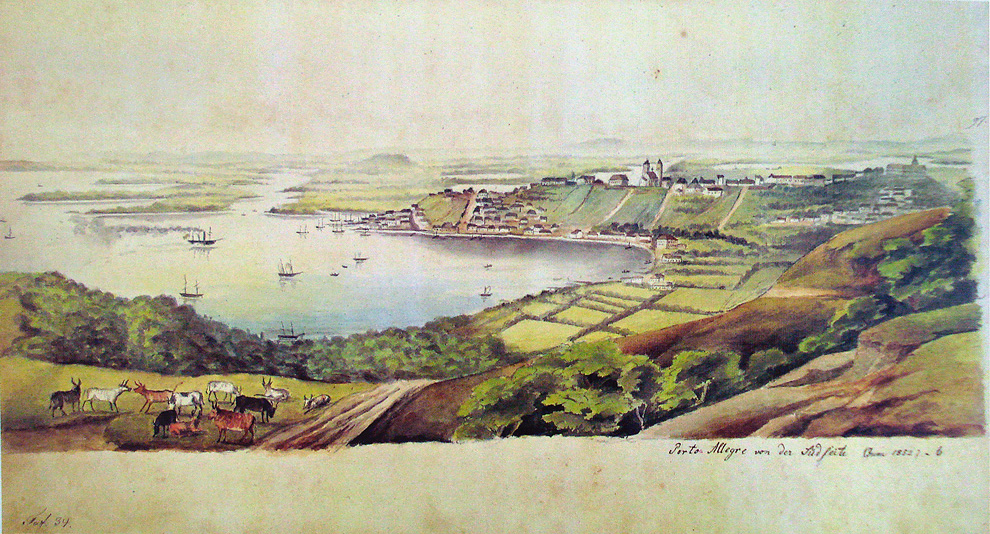
Southern view of Porto Alegre c. 1852. Watercolor by Herrmann Wendroth.

Porto Alegre was born due to the occupation of Rio Grande do Sul by Portuguese estancieiros and sesmeiros in the 18th century, when this territory still legally belonged to the Spanish Crown. The settlement grew around a natural anchorage in the Guaíba Lake, a vast water mirror resulting from the merging of the mouth of four large rivers. This area is protected to the east and south by a gentle range of hills, which defines much of the geography of the place and also defines many architectural and urban solutions of the settlement. The lake, a few kilometers to the south, opens onto the Lagos dos Patos, which has communication with the sea at Rio Grande, difficult for ships, but highly sought after, as it is the only port and sea access to the interior of a large stretch of coastline that runs from Santa Catarina to the da Prata River. With these hydrographic characteristics and strategic importance, it would soon become an administrative headquarters of great importance in the geopolitics of the south of the continent. It became a flourishing commercial entrepôt and a busy fluvial port for ships of small and medium draught coming from the sea through Lagoa dos Patos, receiving goods, people, and even militias and settlers who would later be distributed throughout the vast surrounding region, both by land and up the various rivers that flowed into it. From this region, these people established contact with people from the Missões region - Paraguay, Argentina, and Uruguay - in addition to people from São Paulo, Rio de Janeiro, Spain, and Portugal. It was a meeting point of many cultures, and its geography remains an important part of its cultural identity in contemporary times.

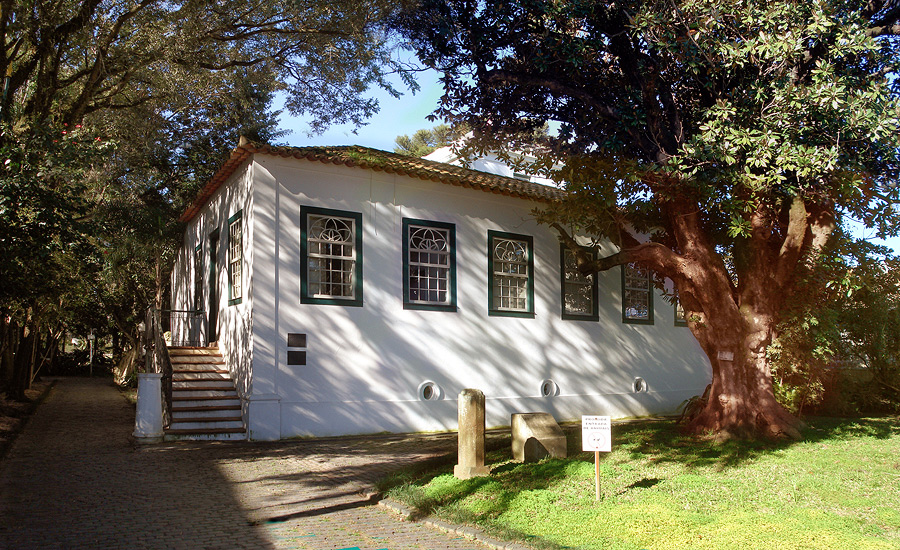
Solar Lopo Gonçalves, a rare survivor of the rural manor house style, today surrounded by the urban mesh.

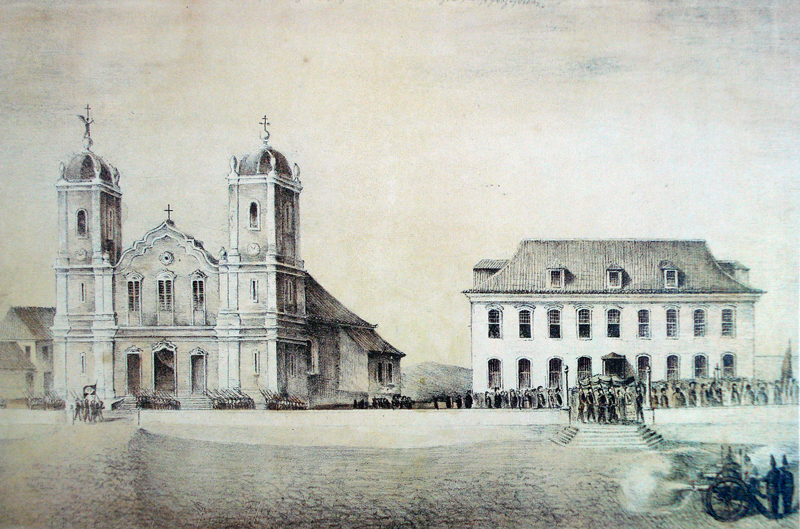
The old Matrix and the Clay Palace, the first important buildings in the city. Watercolor by Herrmann Wendroth, c. 1851.

On December 7, 1744, Jerônimo de Ornellas received by royal charter possession of the land he had occupied since 1732 for animal husbandry, around the anchorage on the Guaíba known at the time as the Port of Viamão. Viamão was located a few kilometers to the east. Consolidating a series of previously sparse initiatives of occupation of the state, from 1752 onwards, families of Azorean immigrants sent by the Portuguese government began to arrive, giving rise to the historical center of the future Porto Alegre, and also to some conflicts with the first sesmeiro, Ornellas. The area was then expropriated and made legally available to the settlers already there, but the actual sharing and delivery of the individual lots would only happen in 1772. In 1760, a large surrounding region, ranging from the Central Depression, the northeast, and the entire coast, already de facto occupied by the Portuguese, was organized into the captaincy of Rio Grande de São Pedro. Indigenous peoples living in the area were gradually removed or exterminated. In 1772, the settlement was elevated to the status of a Freguesia, placed under the protection of Francis of Assisi, and officially named Freguesia de São Francisco do Porto dos Casais, in allusion to the Azorean couples who founded it, disconnecting it from the town of Viamão, then head of the Captaincy. Governor José Marcelino de Figueiredo then ordered the captain of engineering and cartographer Alexandre José Montanha to draw a plan. He organized the layout around the Alto da Praia, a hill by the lakeside from which there is an unobstructed view of the entire surroundings, an embryo of the Praça da Matriz (Matriz Square), the vital core of the settlement that would concentrate its main public buildings and then attract the elite.

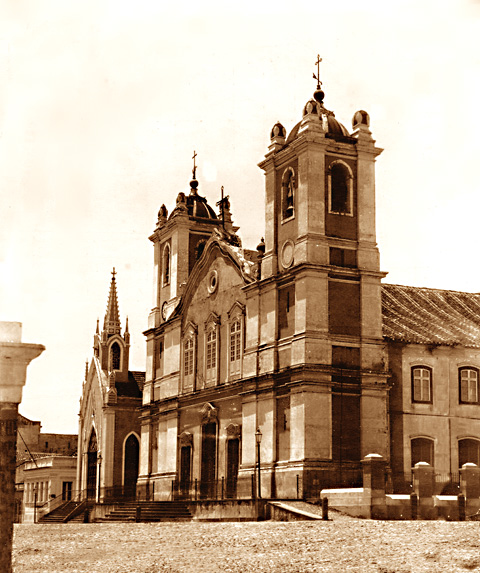
Photo of the old Matrix in 1900, still in its original configuration. Next to it is the chapel of the brotherhood of the Empire of the Holy Spirit, one of the first manifestations of the neo-Gothic style in the city.

In these early years, what was built was modest, and the buildings consisted of small adobe dwellings covered with straw scattered irregularly along the shores of the Guaíba. The first public place to appear was a cemetery, by the lake, but soon transferred to Alto da Praia. The Freguesia became the capital in 1773 even though it was not yet officially a village (this would only occur in 1809, permanently in 1810). The reason for the transfer of the political center to this place, which was still an inexpressive village, was due to its fortunate geographic location.

With this, came new infrastructure needs. Among them was the construction of the so-called "Clay Palace" ("Palácio de Barro"), the first important building of the small town, erected in 1773 at the behest of the governor, aiming to receive the general administration of the captaincy. The building was completed in 1789 and was used until 1896 when it was demolished. It was a two-story palace with two main floors and an attic, symmetrically organized - a central door with four windows on each side. Above, a row of windows, and a pitched roof. The openings had a curved arch, typical of colonial Baroque, and the upper ones received an ornamental cornice, also in a curve.

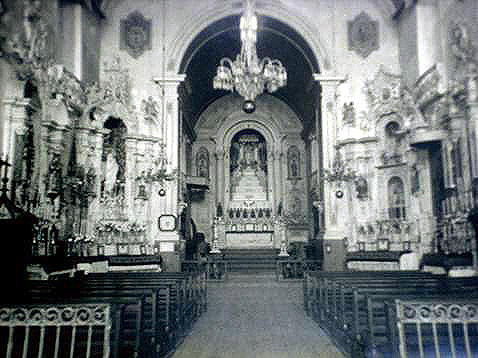
Interior of the old Matrix.

As the Freguesia grew and became richer, the quality of construction also improved, leaving the provisional in favor of the typical colonial style common to all of Brazil, a Portuguese heritage more permanent, voluminous, complex, and ornamental, and which is described aesthetically as a derivation of the Baroque. A special connection with the Azorean version of this Baroque is also often cited since the first waves of settlers came from the Azores, which had developed a rich architectural tradition, although this heritage is controversial.

However, the most ambitious project of this early settlement was the Mother Church ("Igreja Matriz"), whose construction was ordered in the ecclesiastical provision that created the Freguesia. The works began in 1780, based on a drawing sent ready-made by the Archdiocese of Rio de Janeiro, whose authorship is unknown. Its design was late Baroque, or Rococo, and very simple, with little external ornamentation. Its most characteristic element was the delicate undulating pediment, which otherwise followed the functional plan of the Catholic church during the colony: a two-story façade in a tripartite scheme, with decorated openings, an ornamental pediment, and two lateral bell towers. Inside, as was colonial practice, it was more luxurious, with a vestibule under the choir, a nave, a chancel decorated with wood carving, a scenographic retable in the background, secondary altars in side niches, and statuary. The church was not exceptionally rich, but had a very significant internal decoration in a vigorous Rococo style, similar to what can still be seen today in the Mother Church of Viamão. Its construction took many years, and even without being finished, it already needed restoration, as can be seen in an order from the Count of Caxias in 1846 requiring the finishing of the left tower, plastering on the outside, and repairing of the roof that was already in ruins. From the same period and erected on the same site is the Casa da Junta, dated 1790, in a style very close to the Palácio de Barro, but smaller in size. It is the oldest building in the city still standing and served as the headquarters of the Legislative Assembly and the Board of Administration and Collection of the Treasury. Its current appearance is not entirely original, having been remodeled in the 19th century.

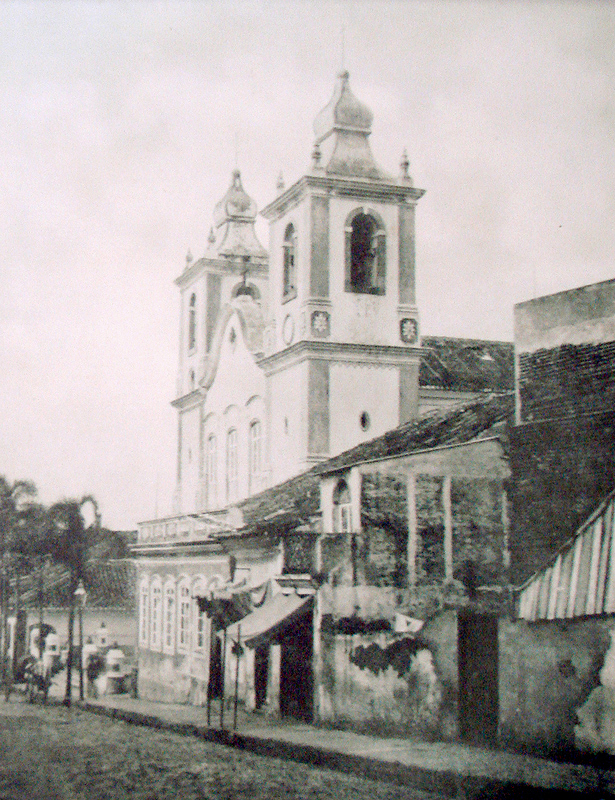
Old Rosário Church, demolished in 1951

The heritage of the colonial style remained strong in the city until the end of the 19th century, especially regarding popular architecture; very austere, with ornaments reduced to a wrought iron railing in the upper floor openings, transformed into doors, and more rarely, a tile coating on the facade. Due to the needs imposed by the urban model of the time, partly for reasons of security and ease of defense in a time of constant military conflicts, the facades were attached, built on the alignment of public roads, with side walls on the limits of the land, leaving yards to the rear. The dwellings could be one or two stories high and built on long, narrow plots of land, their rooms were arranged in a row, mostly poorly ventilated and illuminated, some without any opening to the outside, the so-called alcoves. At the ends of the row were two larger rooms, a drawing room at the front and a multi-purpose room at the back, with a kitchen, dining room, and service area. The material used was adobe or brick, with tiled roofs that sometimes ended in curved eaves. They were plastered and whitewashed on the outside, and the openings had exposed wooden frames. One of the oldest examples of this urban type of residence that has survived to the present day is the Casa Ferreira de Azevedo, but in a ruinous condition, listed by the Municipality but abandoned by its owners.

The elite, on the other hand, built much larger houses and decorated interiors with increasing luxury, sometimes with extensive gardens and secondary buildings, such as the Solar dos Câmara, the oldest residential construction of the city still standing, today transformed into a cultural center. It was built by the Viscount of São Leopoldo between 1818 and 1824 and extensively remodeled in 1874. In the outskirts and rural areas, the manor house remained the most important style, conceived as a mere country house for occasional use or as the headquarters of a more or less self-sufficient production unit. It usually constituted an architectural ensemble composed of a manor house surrounded by improvements, such as storerooms, and slave quarters A good example is Solar Lopo Gonçalves, probably built between 1845 and 1855, still in good condition, being the headquarters of the Joaquim Felizardo Museum.

In the religious field, the 1807 Minor Basilica of Our Lady of Sorrows ("Igreja das Dores") is a highlight, the oldest surviving church in Porto Alegre and declared a National Heritage Site by the National Institute of Historic and Artistic Heritage (IPHAN). Although its projected colonial facade was modified in the early 20th century, its interior is practically intact and displays rich gilded carving. A decade later, the foundation stone of the Rosário Church ("Rosary Church") would be laid (also in colonial Baroque style) and demolished in 1951 amidst great controversy. Of the same aesthetic was the Our Lord of the Steps Chapel (" Capela Senhor dos Passos"), remodeled as a Neogothic building in 1909. In 1851, the Conceição ("Our Lady of Conception") Church was begun, designed, and decorated by João do Couto Silva, the only colonial-style church that has been preserved in its primitive state. In its carving, very rich, neoclassical traces can also be seen. In all of them, important statuary survives.

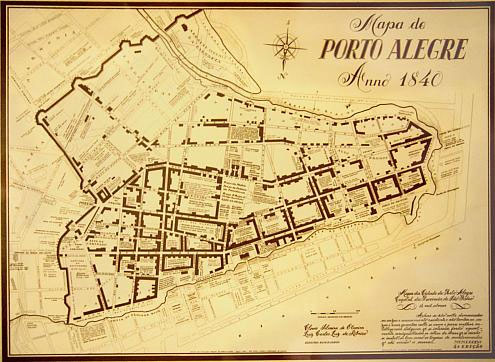
City masterplan in 1840

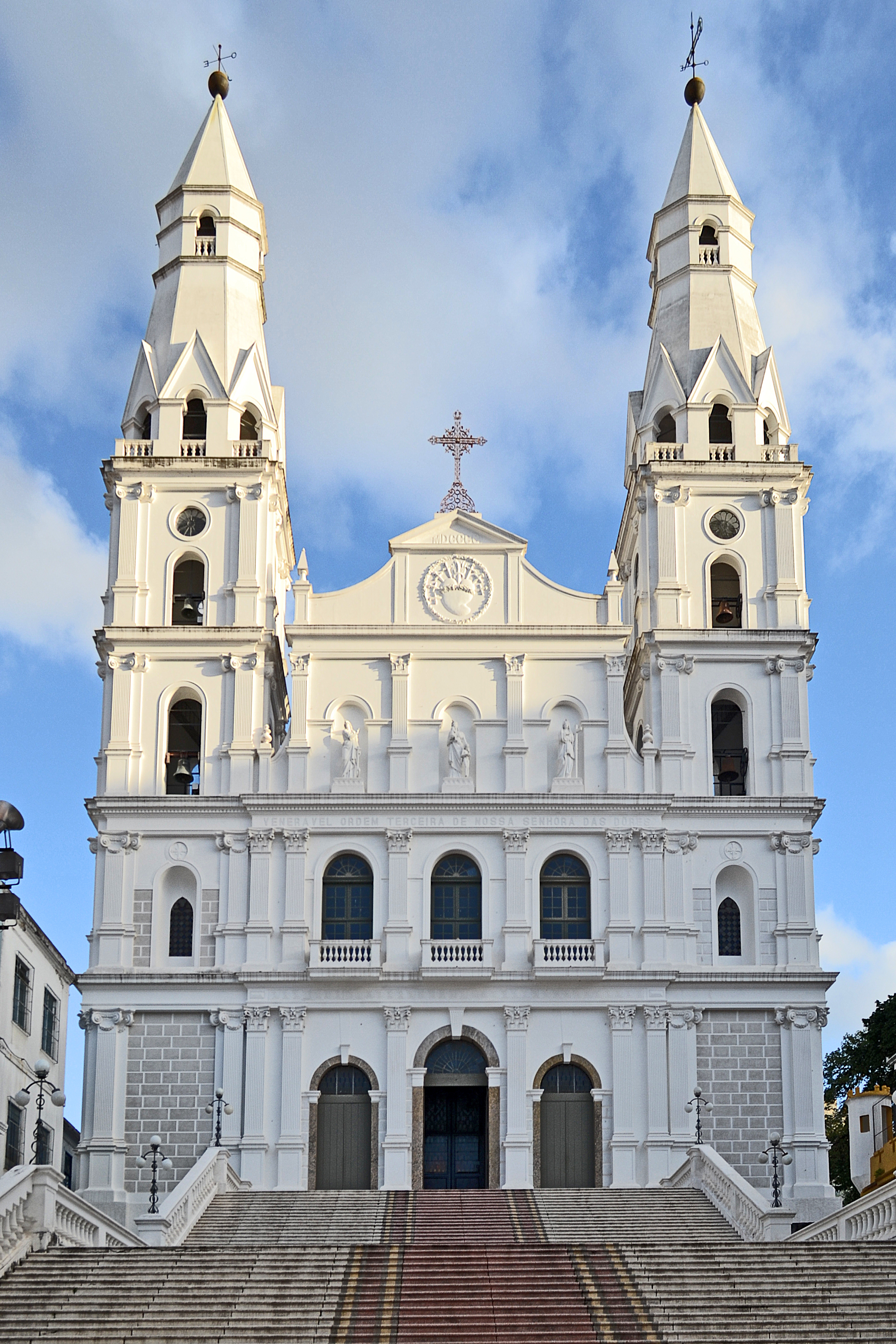
Church of Sorrows ("Igreja das Dores")

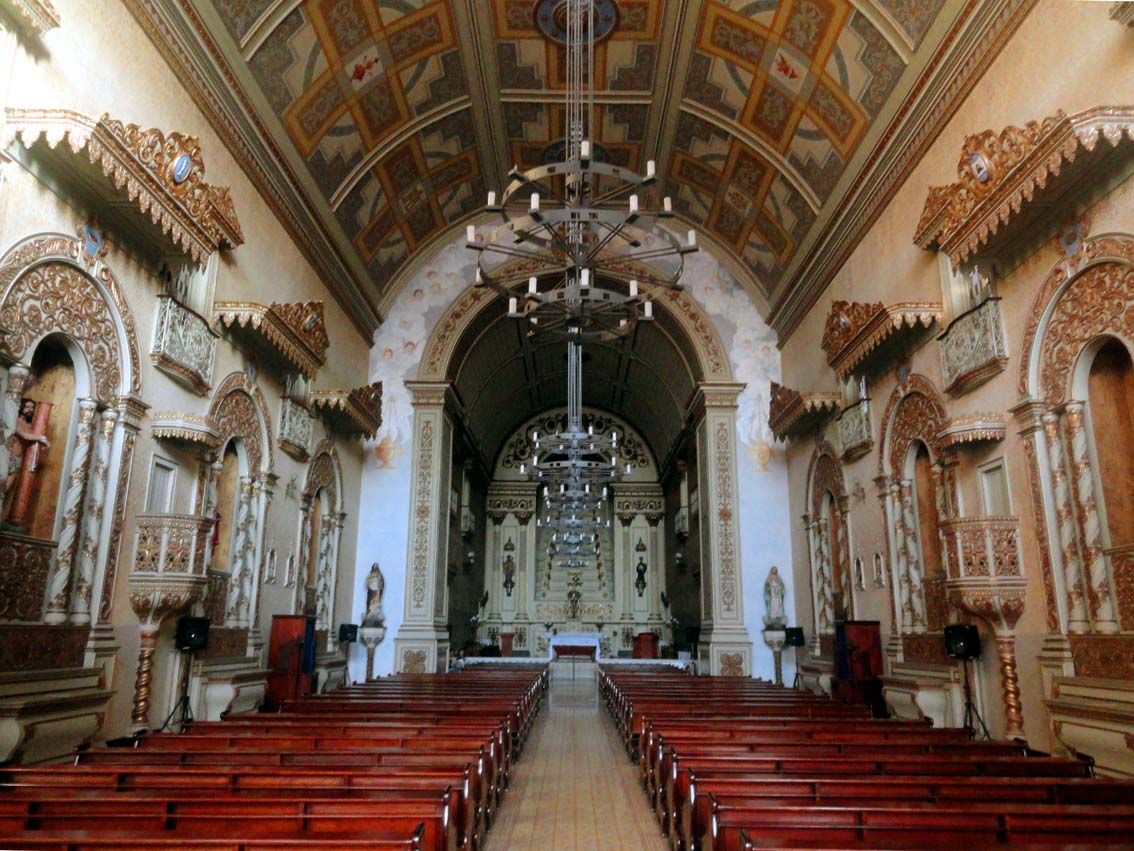
Interior of Igreja das Dores

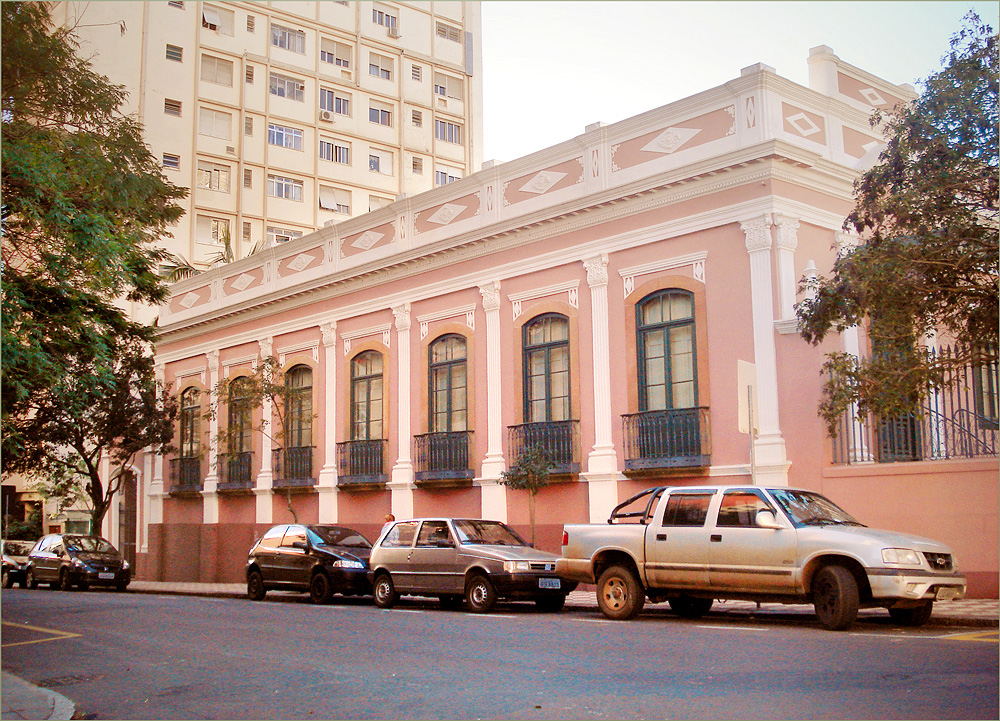
Câmara Manor House

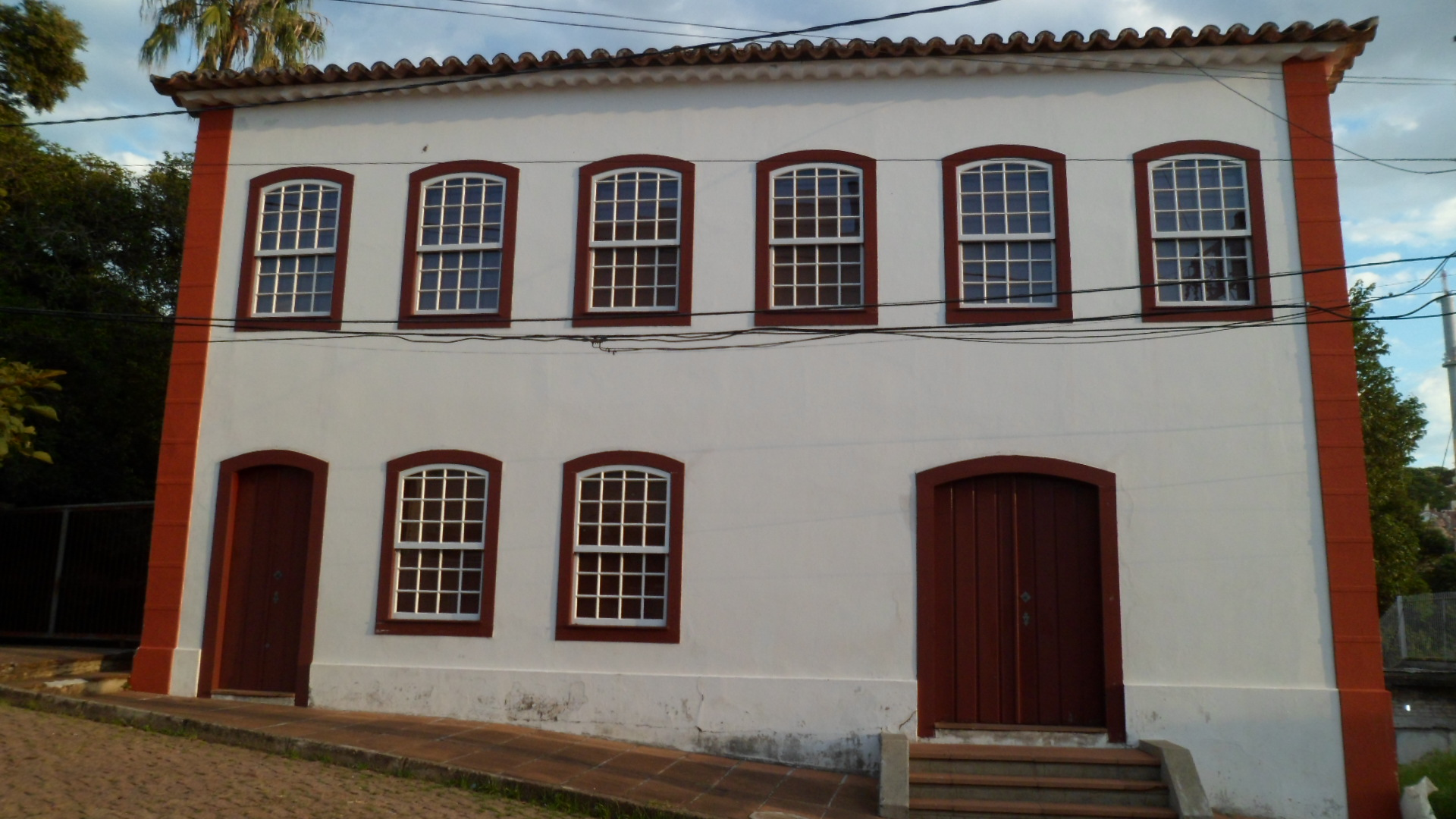
Travessa Paraíso Manor House, one of the last remnants of the city's colonial architecture, built around 1820

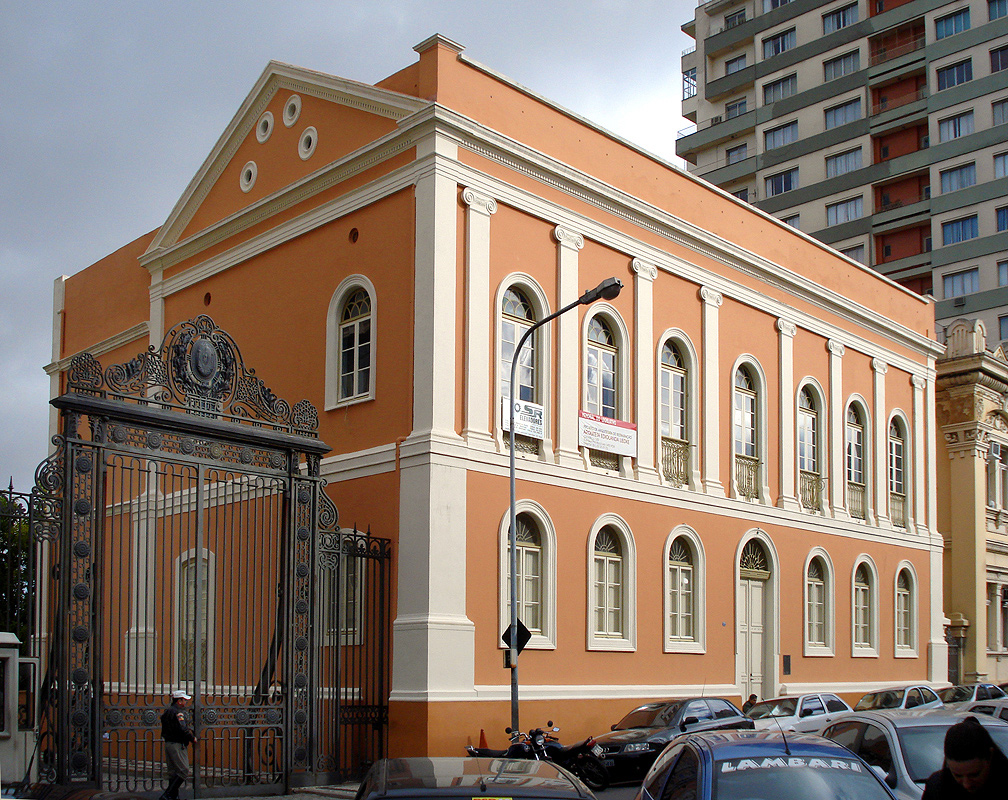
Casa da Junta, whose first-floor dates back to 1790, and is therefore considered the oldest remaining building from the colonial period

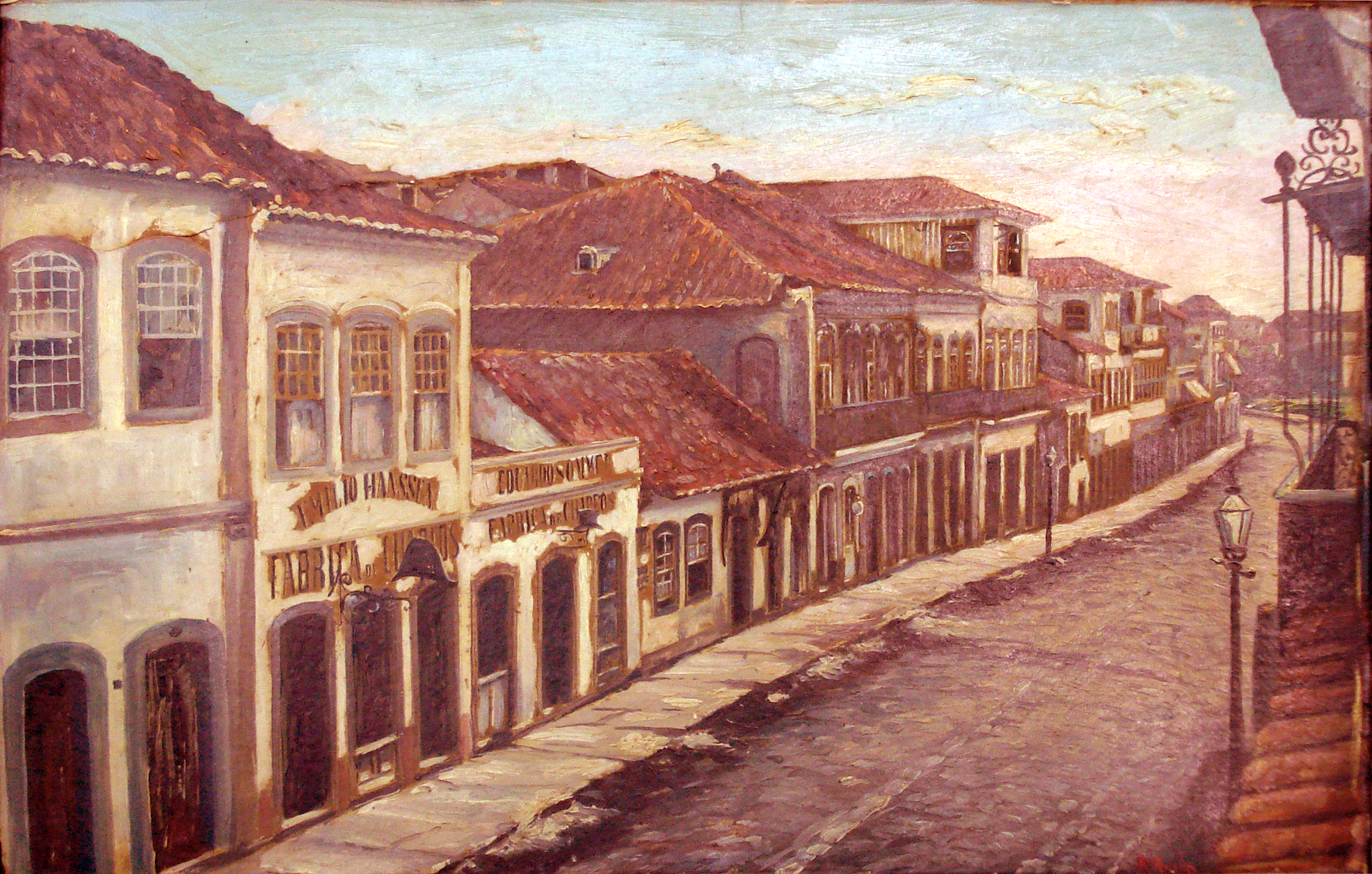
Athayde d'Avila: Rua da Praia, c. 1880. Image of the city center at the end of the 19th century, still with a massive presence of colonial houses.

== Neoclassicism and Eclecticism ==
By mid-century, Neoclassicism had become an important influence, and blended with the old colonial, giving rise to a variety of eclectic solutions, a trend that would dominate the landscape until the 1930s. Of Neoclassical profile, the most important remaining building is the Metropolitan Curia, built in 1865 with a project by Jules Villain (or Villiers), altered in detail by Johann Grünewald, composing a majestic ensemble of palatial dimensions that was hailed by Athos Damasceno as the only monument in the city worthy of its name:

Vast, with its fortress wall, finished at the top by the lacy waist of the balusters, it would impress only by its proportions if, at the end of the long staircase, the classical triangular pediment rose imposingly above the severe order of the smooth columns. (...) In the center - the square area of the cloisters, with the simple arcades on massive pillars, the long sun-beaten corridors, and the good conventual silence that leads people to meditation.

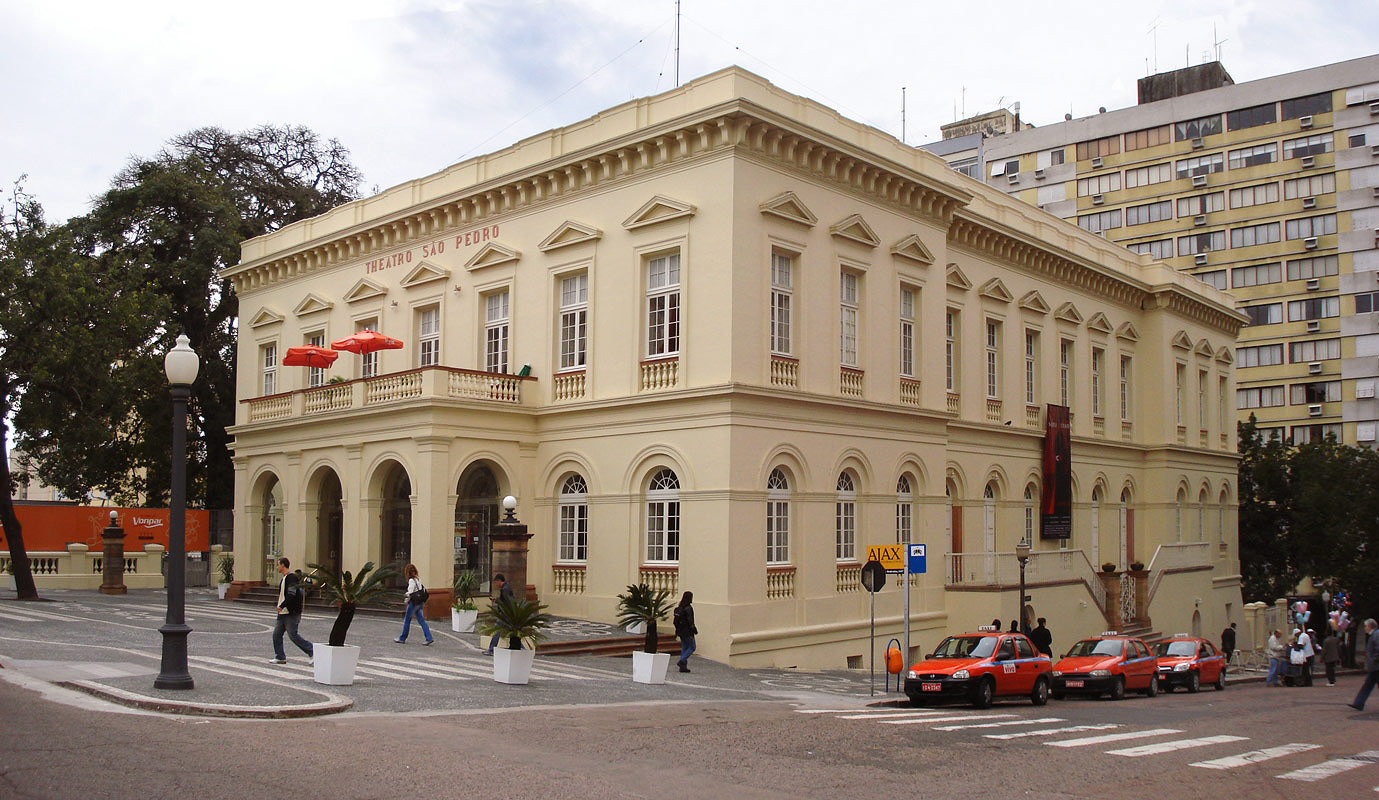
São Pedro Theater, neoclassical.

Surpassing it in fame is the São Pedro Theater, whose project was elaborated in Rio de Janeiro and executed by Phillip von Normann. Inaugurated on June 27, 1858, with a capacity for 700 spectators and decorated in velvet and gold, at a time when Porto Alegre had little more than twenty thousand inhabitants, it is the oldest theater in the city. It suffered stark degradation and was almost demolished in the 1970s, but has been recovered. The theater was conceived with a twin building that rose across the street, the old Court of Justice, but this was destroyed by fire in the 1950s. The purest neoclassicism left scant remnants, among them the Torelly House and the Bonfim Chapel.

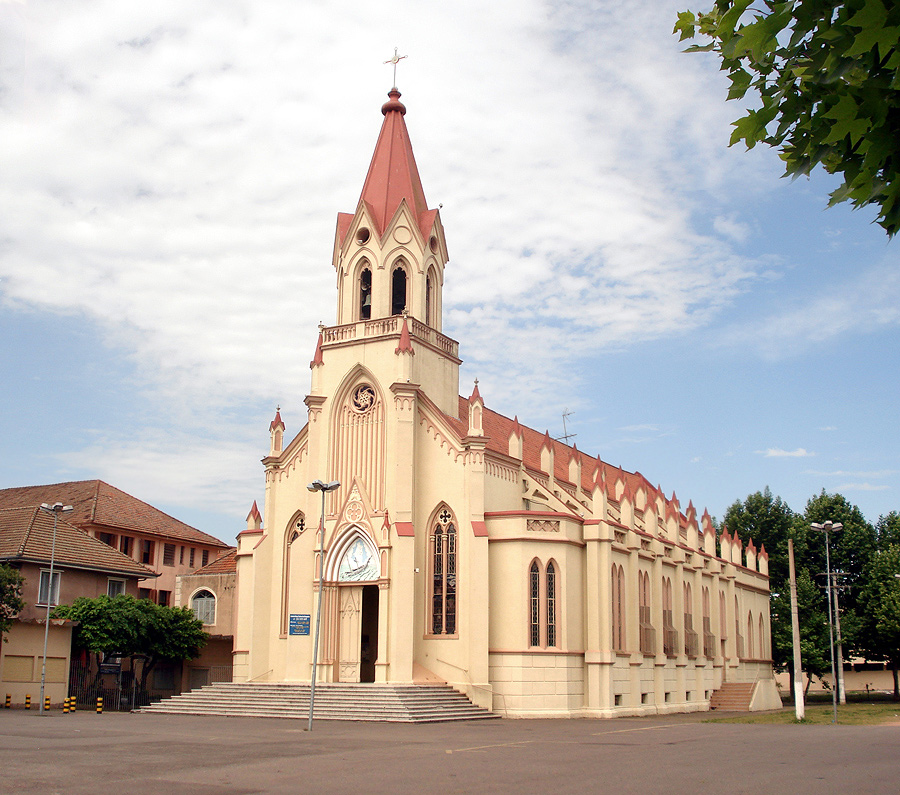
Church of Navegantes, one of the first neo-Gothic buildings.

Soon Eclecticism would predominate. An imposing example is the Public Market, which replaced the earlier, smaller market. It was planned by engineer Frederico Heydtmann in 1861. The construction had its cornerstone laid in 1864, being inaugurated in 1869. The complex underwent substantial modification in the 1910s with the addition of a second floor, while preserving the style. Of similar stylistic characterization are the Museu do Comando Militar do Sul ("Museum of the Southern Military Command"), a large building inaugurated in 1867, built by master-operator Manoel Alves de Oliveira as an annex to the War Arsenal; the building of the 8th Military Service Circuit, erected on an earlier construction that housed the Royal Stores; and the Provisional Palace, whose design, by engineer Francisco Nunes de Miranda, was later modified by engineer Antônio Mascarenhas Telles de Freitas. Work on the Provisional Palace began in 1857 and the project included structural solutions that were advanced for the time, such as the roof slab with a system of double "T" steel profiles combined with compression bricks, forming small arches. Another imposing eclectic building was the House of Correction, later demolished, of neoclassical distribution and detailing that referred to military architecture. One of the grand examples of Porto Alegre's eclecticism is the historical complex of the São Pedro Psychiatric Hospital, which according to Institute of Historical and Artistic Heritage of the State of Rio Grande do Sul (IPHAE) technicians is:

the largest built area of social interest that the 19th century bequeathed to the province. With 132,654 square feet (12,324 m2), the centennial architectural complex is composed of six two-story pavilions facing south and connected transversally by a pavilion in the east-west direction. With eclectic lines, neoclassical architecture predominates in the historic area of São Pedro.

Another aesthetic element that added diversity to the Porto Alegre Eclecticism was the Neogothic, which was restricted to the religious sphere. Present in the city since the mid-19th century, its first manifestations were discrete - a small chapel in Matriz Square, the Empire of the Holy Spirit, and the modified balustrades of the Metropolitan Curia. The style only gained visibility with the construction, in the early 20th century, of several important temples: the neogothic reform of the Passos Chapel, the Our Lady of Navigators church (Porto Alegre), the Santa Teresinha Church, likely the most refined (designed by Friar Cyríaco de São José), the Anglican Cathedral, the Methodist Cathedral, and the São Pedro Church, the most imposing of all, designed by Josef Hruby.

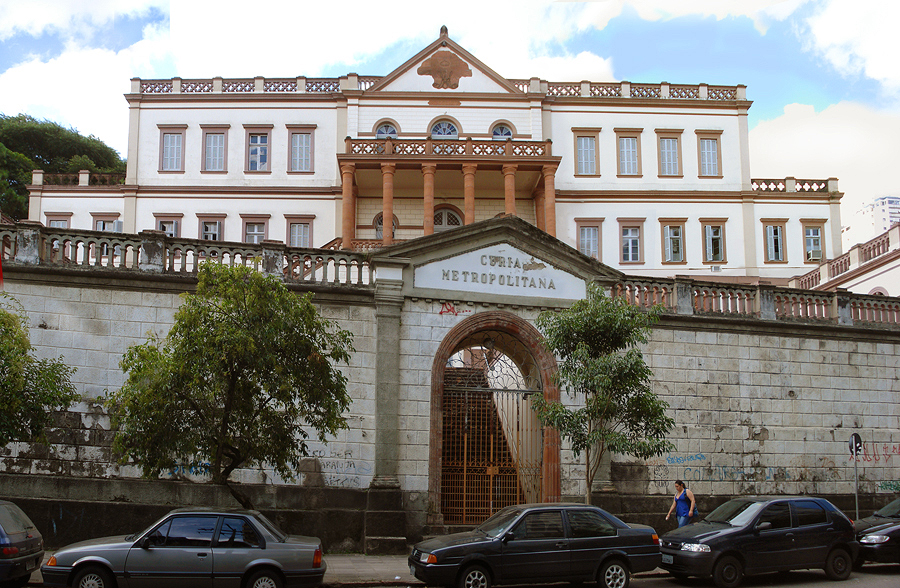
Metropolitan Curia

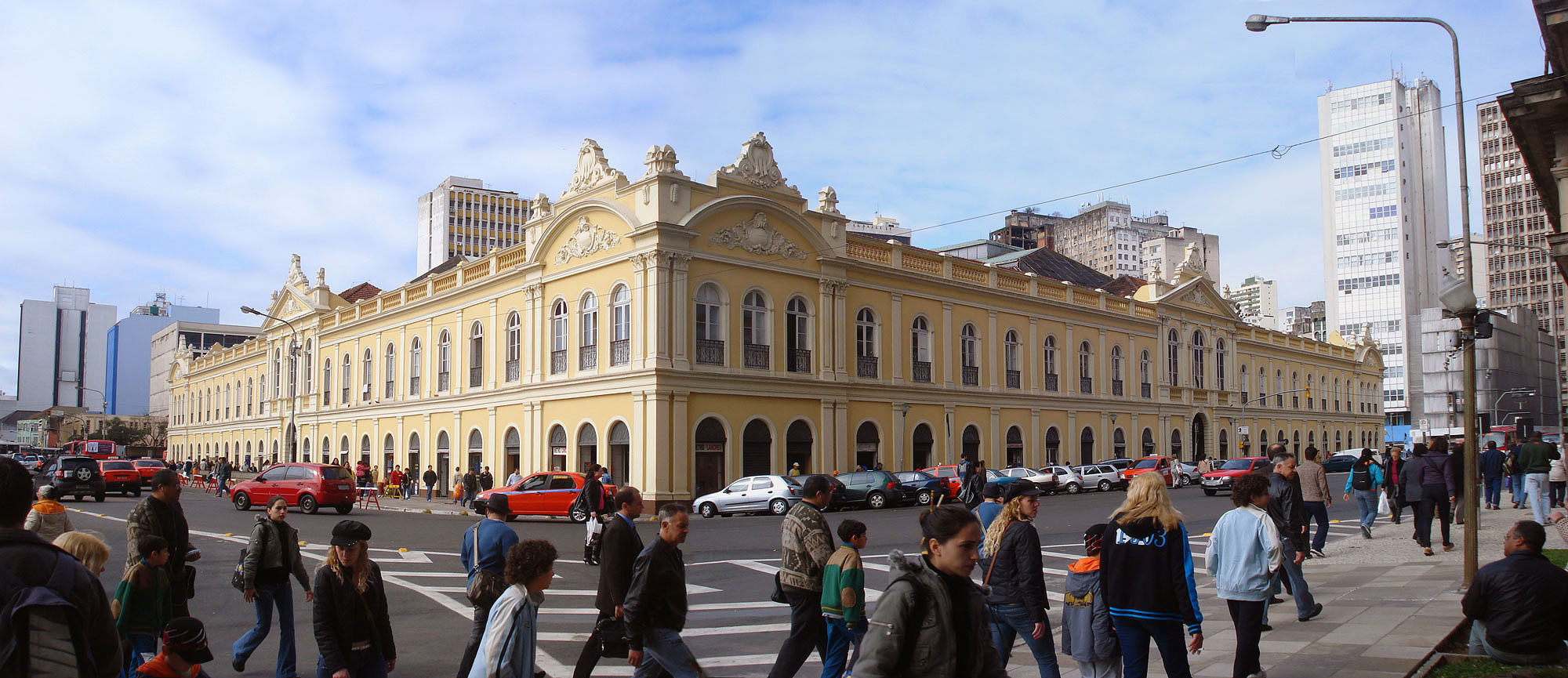
Public Market

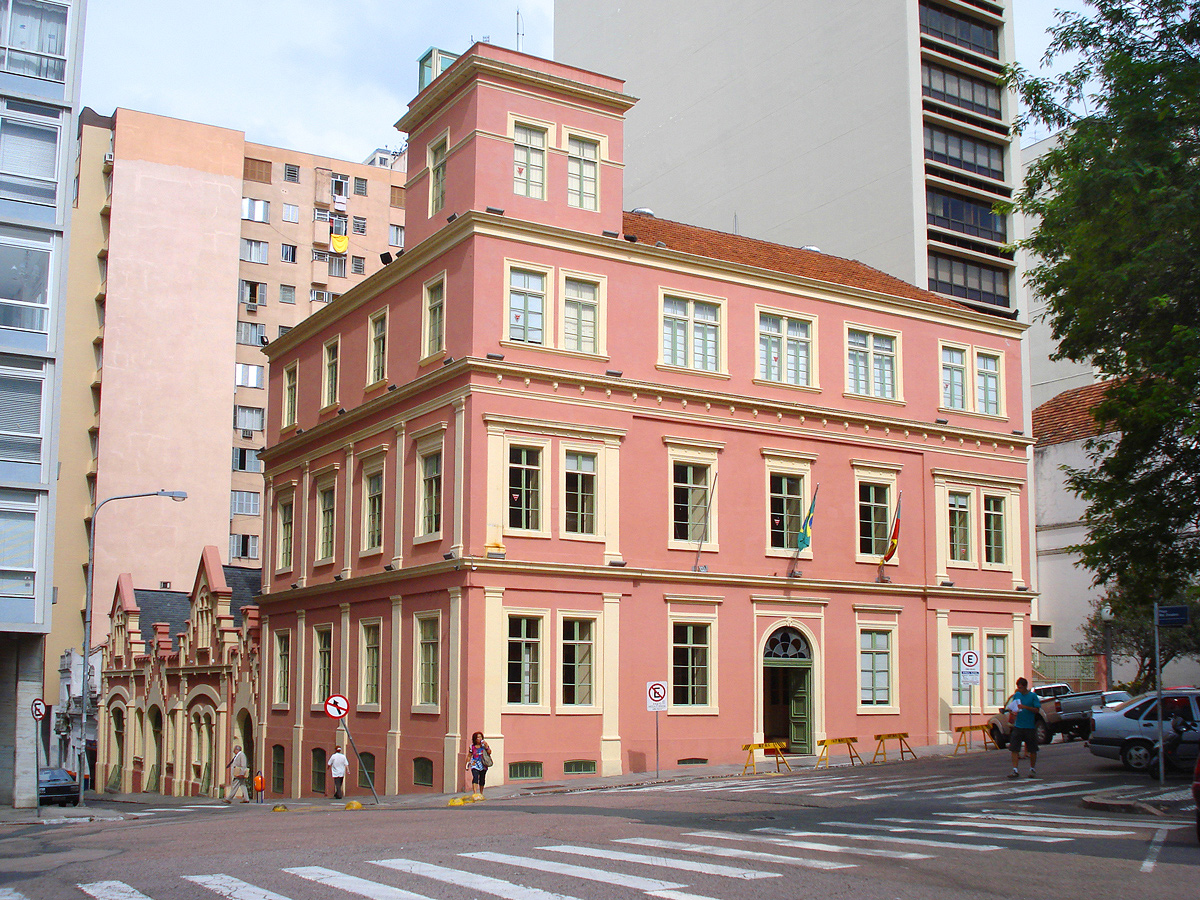
Palace of the Public Ministry, former Provisional Palace

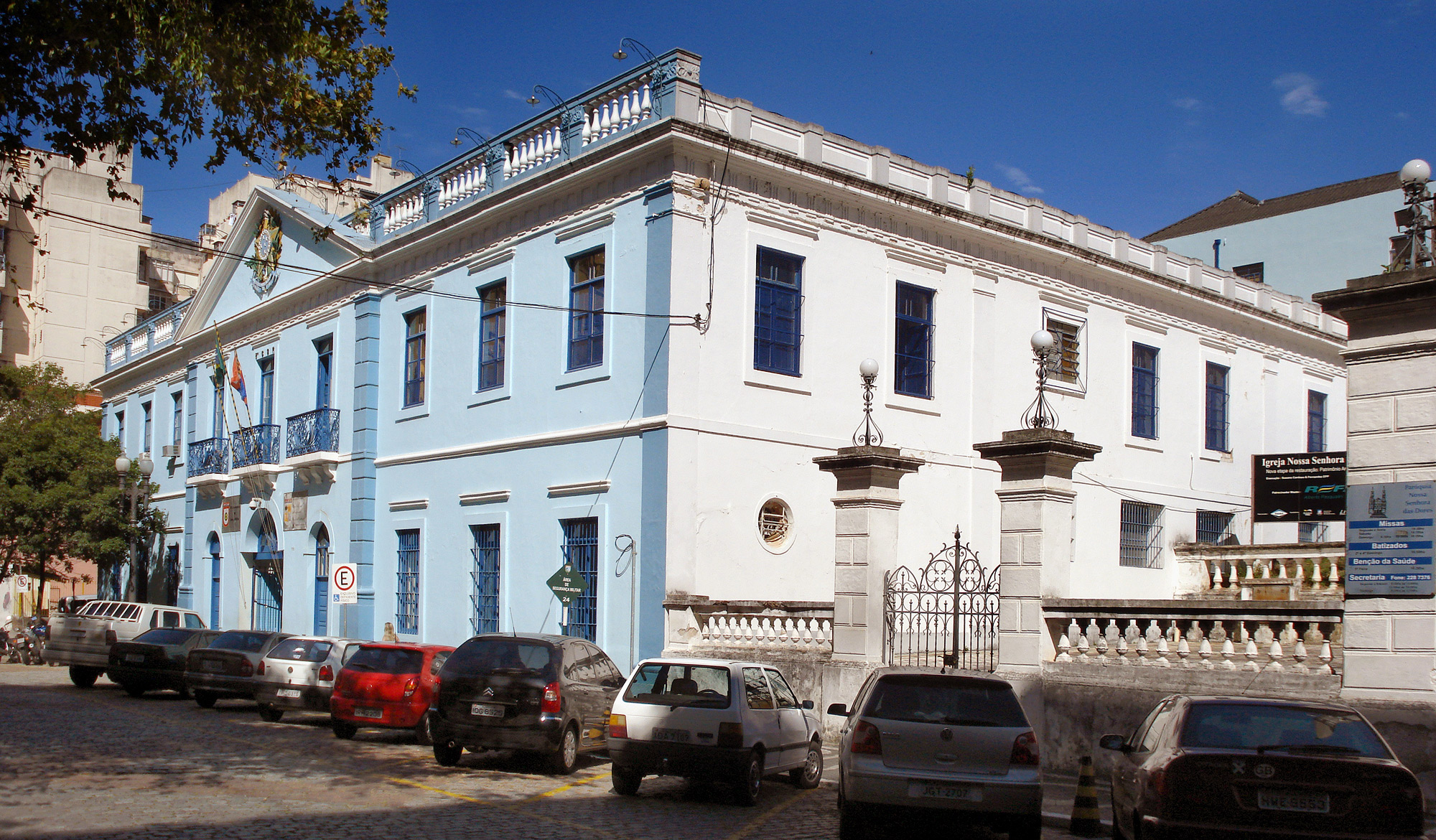
8th Military Service Circuit Building

=== The "golden phase" of monumental architecture ===
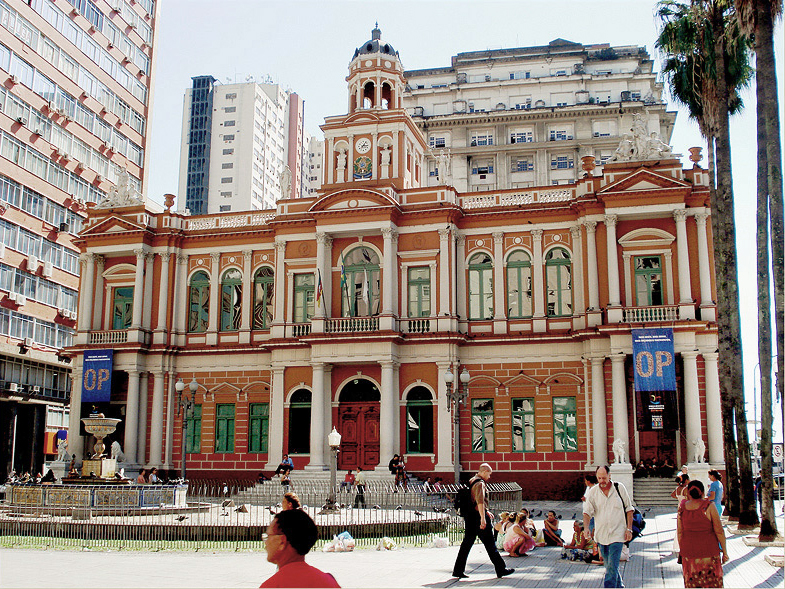
Paço Municipal

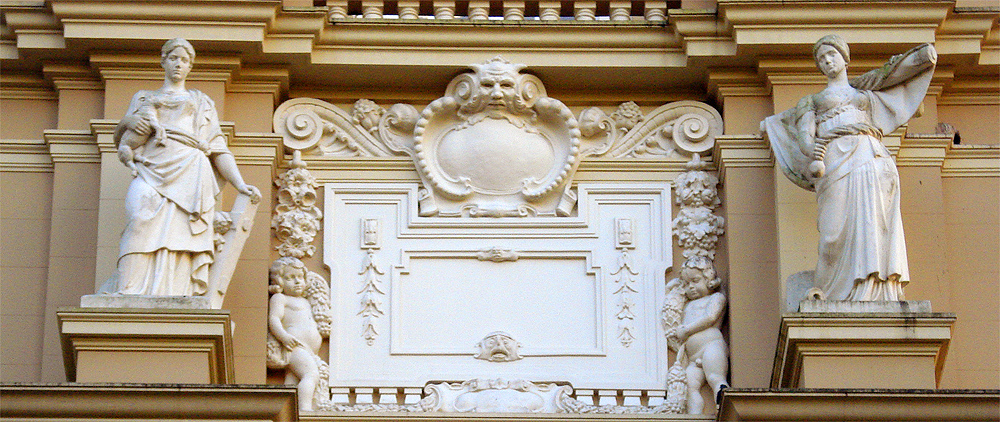
Decoration on the facade of the old Tax Station, currently the Rio Grande do Sul Art Museum, with the allegorical statues of Cattle Raising and Navigation.

With a more ornate Eclecticism is the Paço Municipal (Town Hall), designed by Giovanni Colfosco, an Italian. Its construction began in 1898, and it would be one of the first architectural examples to display the influence of Positivism, perceived in the complex network of allegories represented in the decorative statuary of the facade. It would also be one of the first monumental public buildings of what was called the "golden phase" of Porto Alegre's architecture. According to Beatriz Thiesen:

The reformulation of the urban structure, which was a common phenomenon in the Western world in the nineteenth century, was associated with the ideas of modernity present in the social imaginary of the time. In this sense, Porto Alegre was also part of a broad process linked to the emergence of a bourgeois social order that demanded a reordering of the city according to the new values that emerged in its wake and that, little by little, were consolidated in the social imaginary. The aim was to overcome the colonial past, which the ascendant elite wished to forget, and the architectural forms thus corresponded to the ideals of progress and civilization: the emerging bourgeoisie sought to mirror itself in European culture, considered more advanced and civilized. In a grandiloquent display, this bourgeoisie sought to mark an ethos of modernity flaunted as aesthetics.

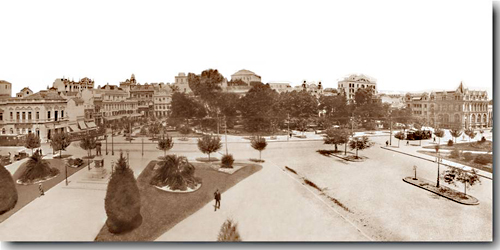
Overview of the Customs House Square in 1929.

This desire for renewal brought several novelties to the city's architecture. A rich bourgeoisie formed mainly by descendants of German immigrants, together with the official spheres, gave the most decisive impulse, commissioning sumptuous works, at a time when the state was experiencing a phase of prosperity, having become the third economy in Brazil. The most important influences that defined the profile of the main buildings erected during this phase were French Pompier architecture, with its exuberant decorativism and ostentatious character, and the positivist philosophy adopted by the government, creating an idealistic iconography that mirrored visions of progress, civilization, hygiene, and order.

Construction techniques kept up with the development of technology and industry: reinforced concrete, steel, and cement were used more extensively for construction; buildings rose to greater heights; facade statuary multiplied and cheap solutions were found for its manufacture, such as cement molds. The decorative materials also changed, with stained glass windows, metal ornaments, wall paintings with landscapes and ornaments in the interiors, and marble for columns, floors, and other elements becoming common. Also important was the formulation in 1914 by the Municipal Government of the General Improvement Plan, possibly conceived by João Moreira Maciel, and considered by Helton Bello the greatest legacy of the positivist administration in urbanistic terms, as it was a fundamental instrument for the modernizing transformations that would consolidate soon after, supplanting the structure and urban image of colonial heritage.

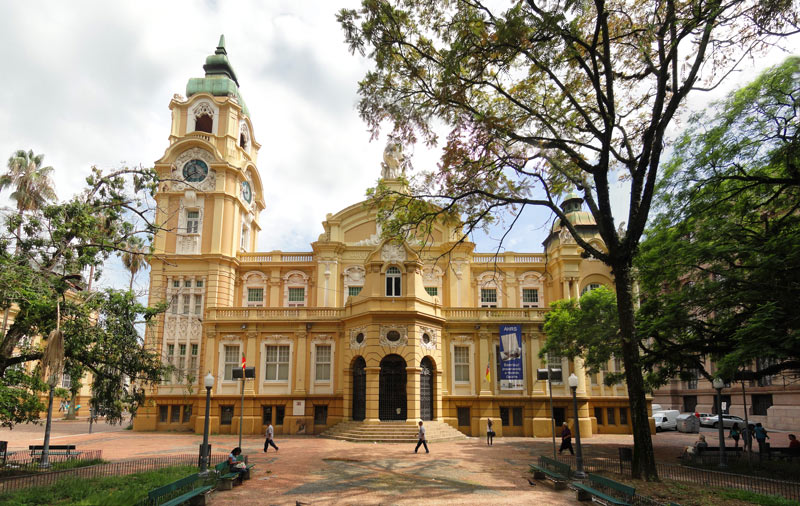
Post and Telegraph Office, today the Memorial of Rio Grande do Sul.

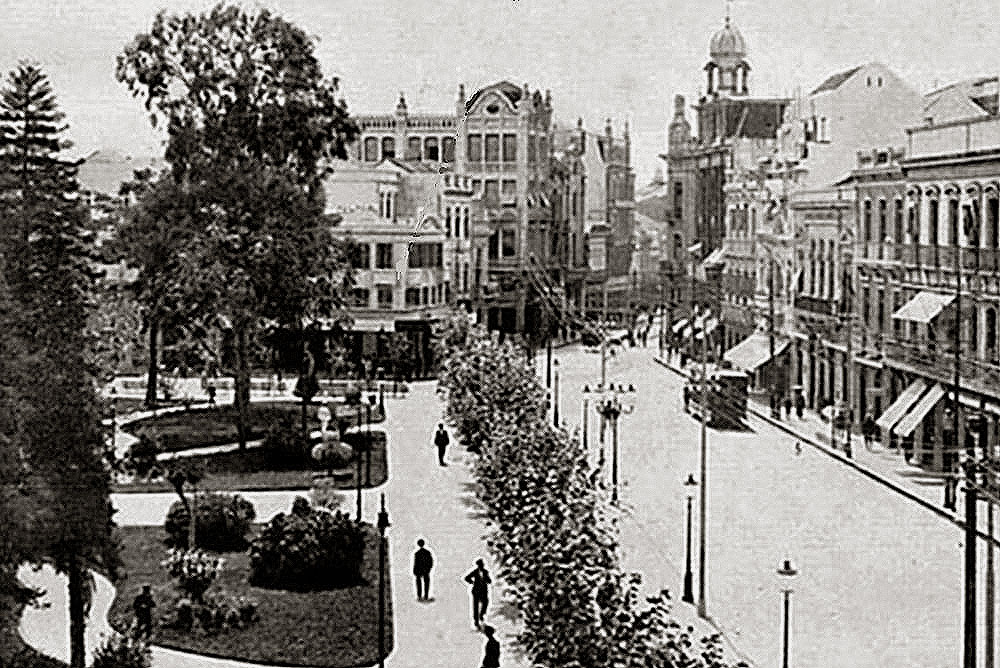
View of the city center in the early 20th century. The eclectic style entirely replaced the colonial architecture.

Significant names in this phase were Theodor Wiederspahn, German-born architect, owner of a eclectic style, combining Renaissance, Neo-Baroque, and Neoclassical features with a luxurious decorative conception; Rudolf Ahrons, engineer-builder, head of a construction office that carried out the most important works, and João Vicente Friedrichs, owner of the most requested and populous local decoration studio, employing a multitude of local and foreign craftsmen with preparation, such as Alfred Adloff, Wenzel Folberger, Alfredo Staege, and many more. The partnership established between them lasted until 1914, when Ahrons' office closed, and left a series of imposing buildings, some accomplishing remarkable architectural feats, such as the building of the former Brahma Brewery, which at its inauguration was the largest reinforced concrete building in Brazil. Other examples are the Post and Telegraph Office, the Medical School of the UFRGS, and the Tax Police Station building, whose authorship by Wiederspahn is controversial but likely.

Günter Weimer also attributes to him the basic layout of the new Metropolitan Cathedral, which replaced the old Matriz, although credit for the project is usually given to the Italian Giovanni Giovenalle. Wiederspahn would continue designing after Ahrons' withdrawal from the market, still often relying on Friedrichs for decoration. His work counts more than 500 projects, not only in Porto Alegre. Many of them no longer exist but are preserved as the Ely Building, the Hotel Majestic, and the Previdência do Sul, in addition to more than a dozen palaces for the elite. For Maturino Luz, his role in the history of architecture in Porto Alegre compares, keeping the proportions, to that of Gaudí in Barcelona. He was one of the founders of a School of Arts and Crafts and the first union of architects.

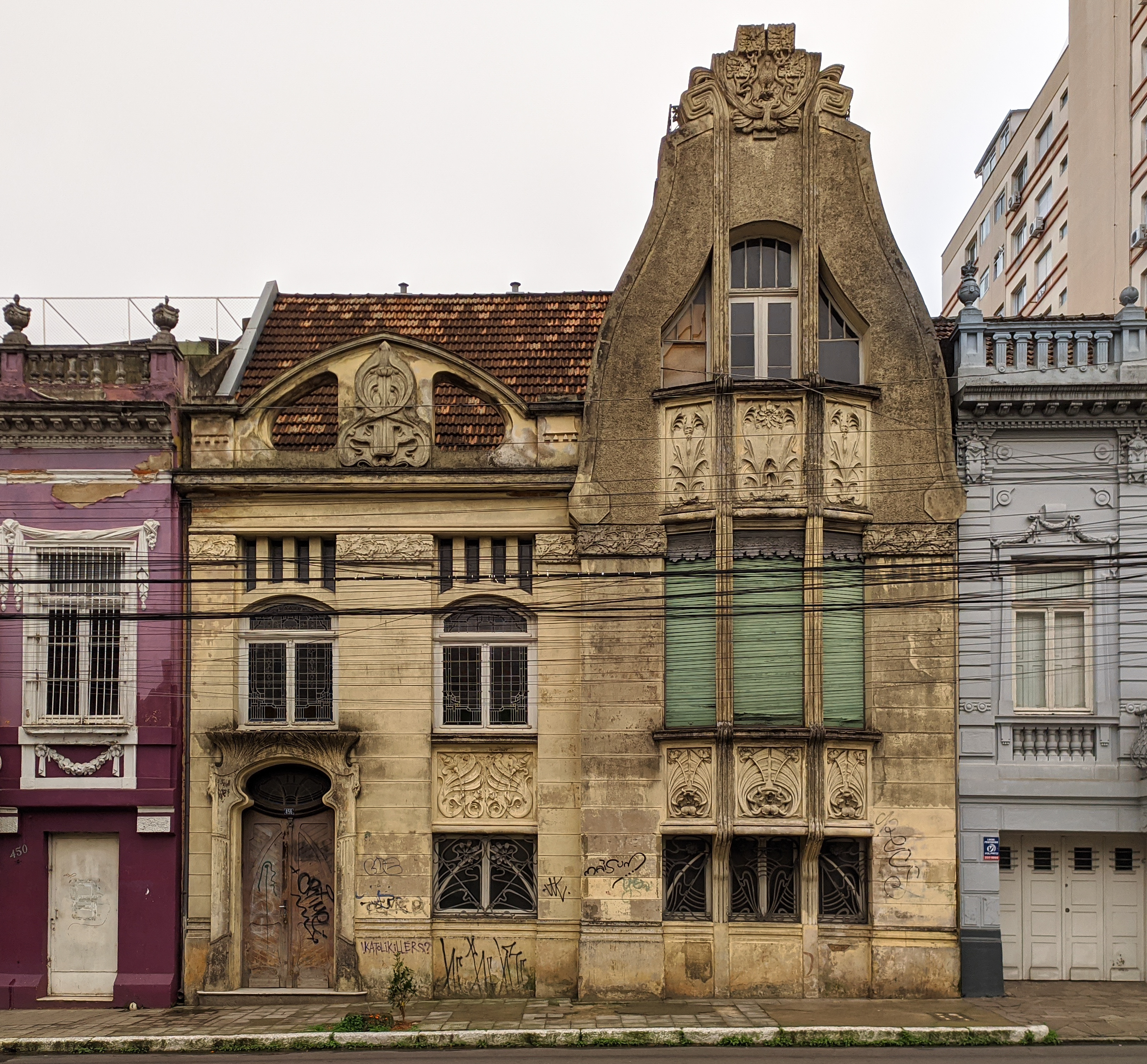
Godoy House

Manoel Itaqui, one of the introducers of Art Nouveau, designed several buildings in the central campus of Federal University of Rio Grande do Sul such as the Castelinho ("Little castle"), the Astronomical Observatory, as well as the former headquarters (now gone) of Colégio Júlio de Castilhos and the Otávio Rocha Viaduct (the latter in partnership with Duilio Bernardi); Hermann Menschen, author of the UFRGS Law School and several residences; Affonso Hebert, whose most notable work is the State Public Library; and finally the Frenchman Maurice Gras, author of only one project in the city, but of great importance, the Piratini Palace, the current seat of the State Government and official residence of the governor.

Some examples, in particular, can also be cited for being rare or outstanding in their type, such as Carvalho Pharmacy and Godoy House, among the few examples of Art Nouveau in its purest state; Confeitaria Rocco, with its monumental Atlas; the old Army Headquarters, with Moorish and medieval influence; the Palmeiro and Argentina palaces, typical residences of the elite, of great sumptuousness; the Banco da Província, with rich stained-glass windows and decoration. The remaining set on Travessa dos Venezianos, on the other hand, is a good example of simplified Eclecticism, adapted to the low-income classes.

Representatives of industrial architecture include the Gasômetro power plant, the aforementioned Brahma Brewery, the Moinho Rio-Grandense, and several other buildings in the former Industrial District. Worthy of note is the Cais Mauá complex, designed by Ahrons, a vast public work that cost decades of work, representing one of the greatest efforts by the government and society of Rio Grande do Sul in the early twentieth century toward urban modernization and economic development. The structures erected also set new standards of hygiene, functionality, and aesthetics for civil construction, particularly notable are the large central iron portico and the side, collapsible warehouses, which were imported from France.

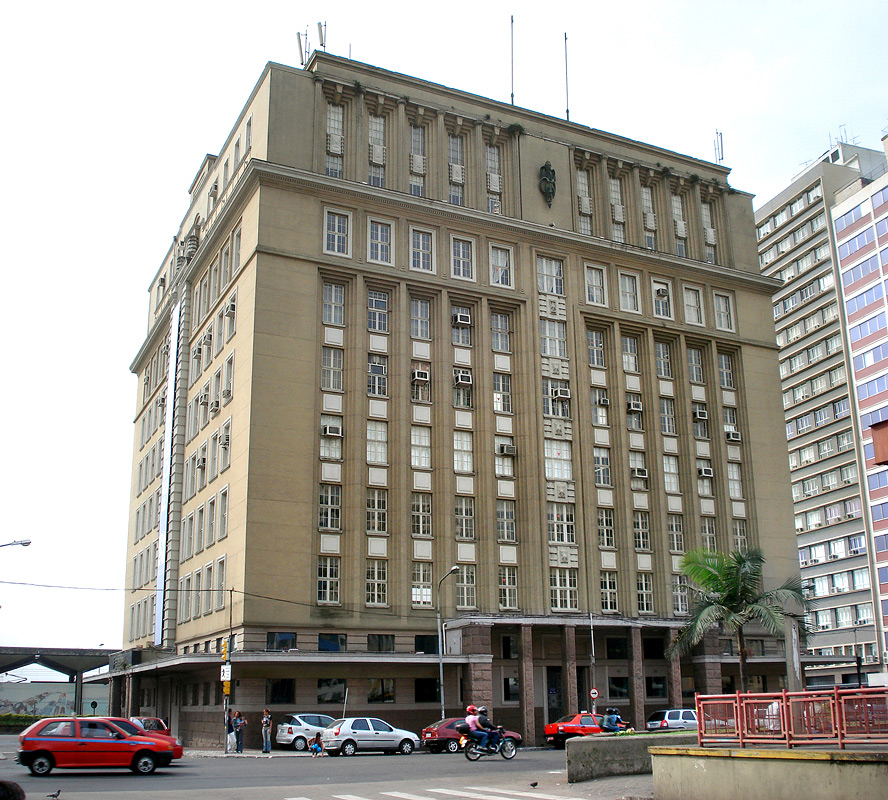
Palace of Commerce, 1937, Deco.

The next generation was more adept of Art Deco, considered the last eclectic derivation or the first stage of Modernism, where Fernando Corona, Armando Boni, and Joseph Lutzenberger stood out. The Deco aesthetic abandons the heavy decorativism of late Eclecticism in search of solutions with reduced ornamentation and more integration with the functionality and structure of the spaces, which, together with advances in construction techniques, made possible the beginning of the verticalization process of the city. Its works reflect this new synthesis, a new vision of progress and beauty linked to simplicity, rationality, practicality, and structural authenticity, ideas that would be radicalized by the modernists.

The Deco presence was detected between 1920 and 1930, preceding Modernism in the city by about 10 years. Corona began as a sculptor, a pupil of Friedrichs, but soon ventured into architecture, with good results. He adapted the exterior of a project by Wiederspahn for the Província Bank, now the Farol Santander, and designed the Chaves Gallery and the Flores da Cunha Institute of Education. Boni designed the Globo Library building, the Concha Acústica of the former Araújo Vianna Auditorium, and the São Miguel e Almas Cemetery, the first vertical cemetery in Latin America, as well as several other public and private works, such as his own residence. Lutzenberger came from Germany to work at the construction company Weis & Cia, designing important buildings such as the São José Church, the Comércio Palace, and the Pão dos Pobres Foundation. The works of the three creators were hailed by their contemporaries as landmarks of the most modern architecture, and remain among the most significant examples of the building style in the city in the interwar period, with several of them being protected by the public authorities.

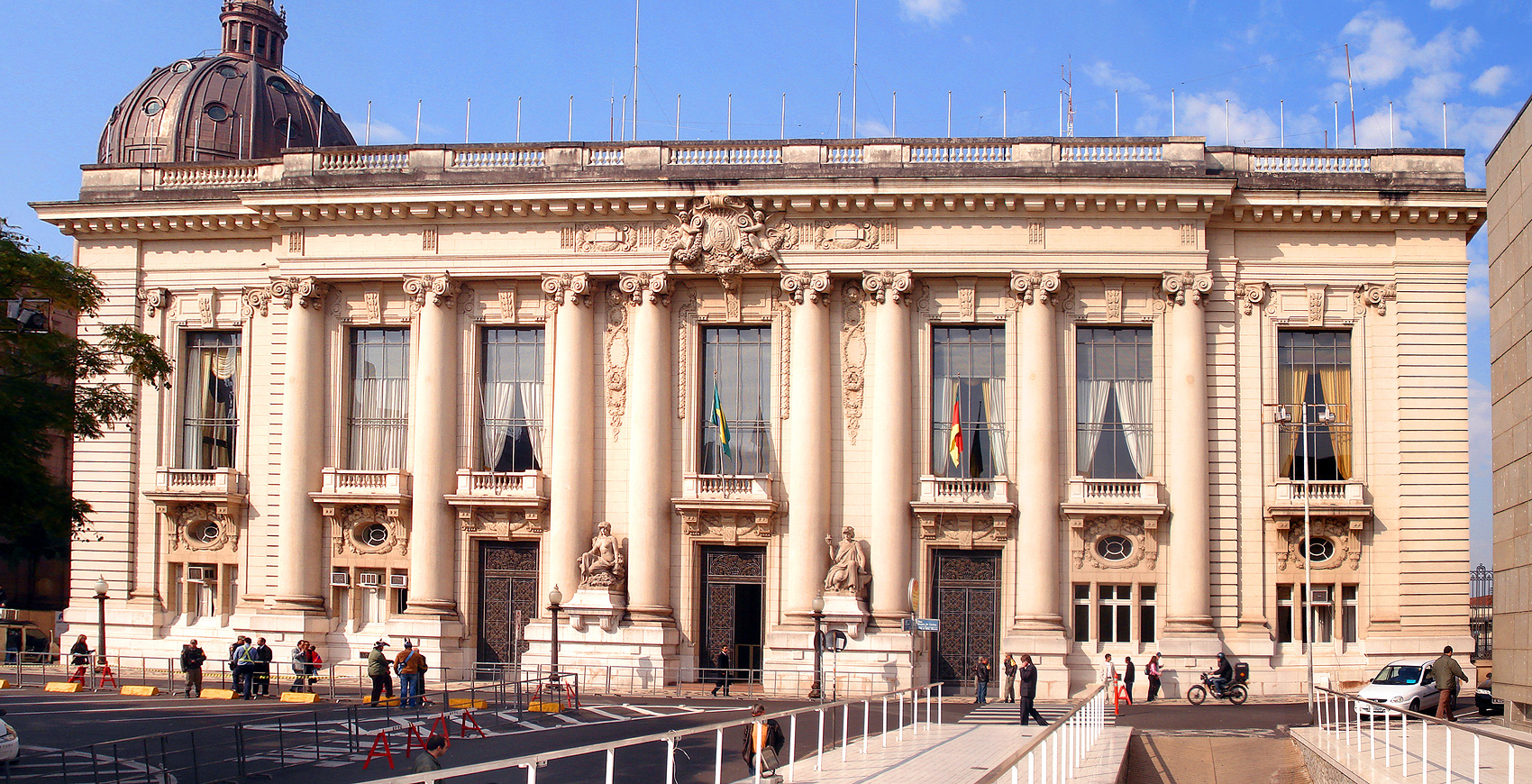
Piratini Palace

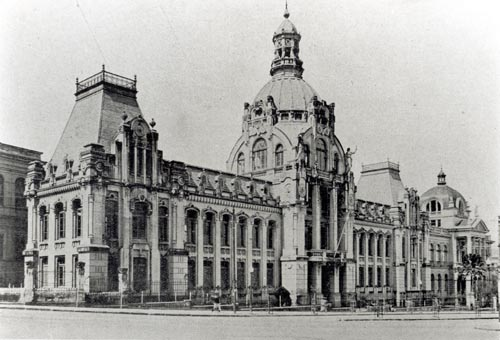
Former Júlio de Castilhos School

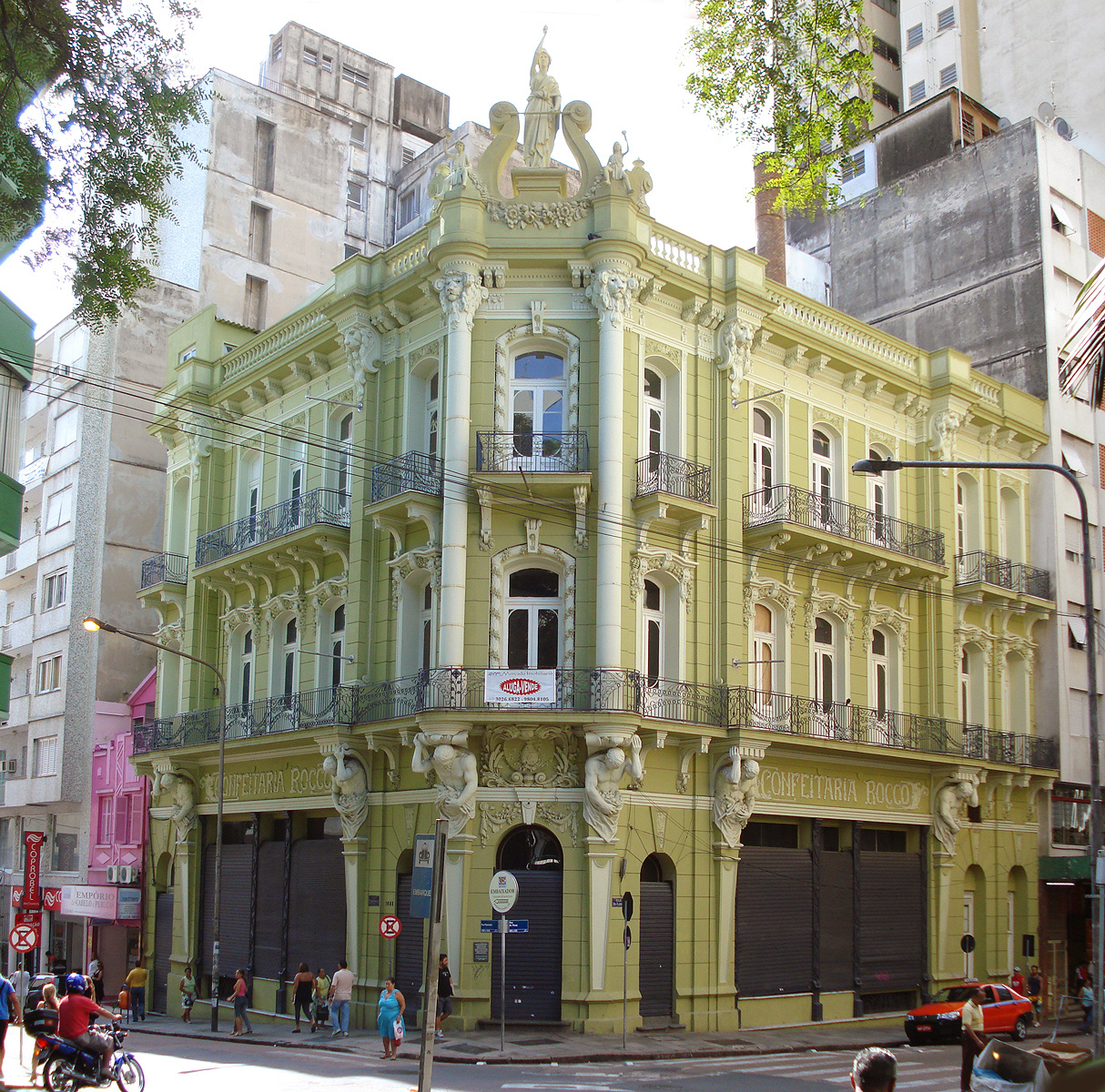
Confeitaria Rocco

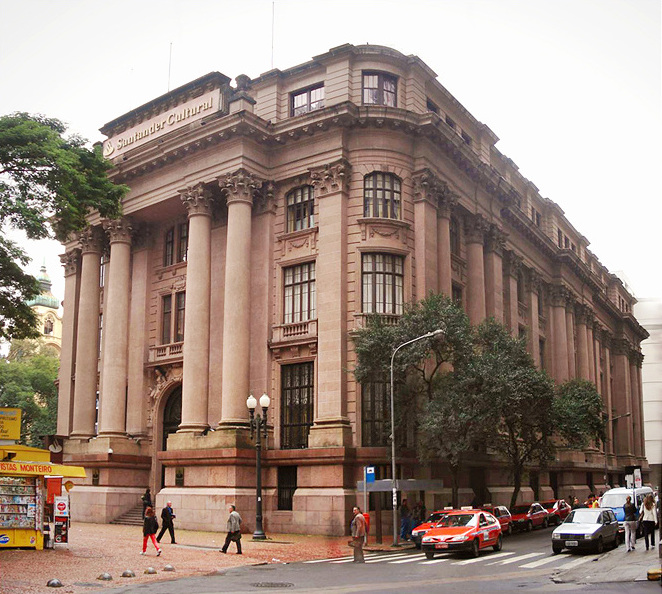
Farol Santander Porto Alegre

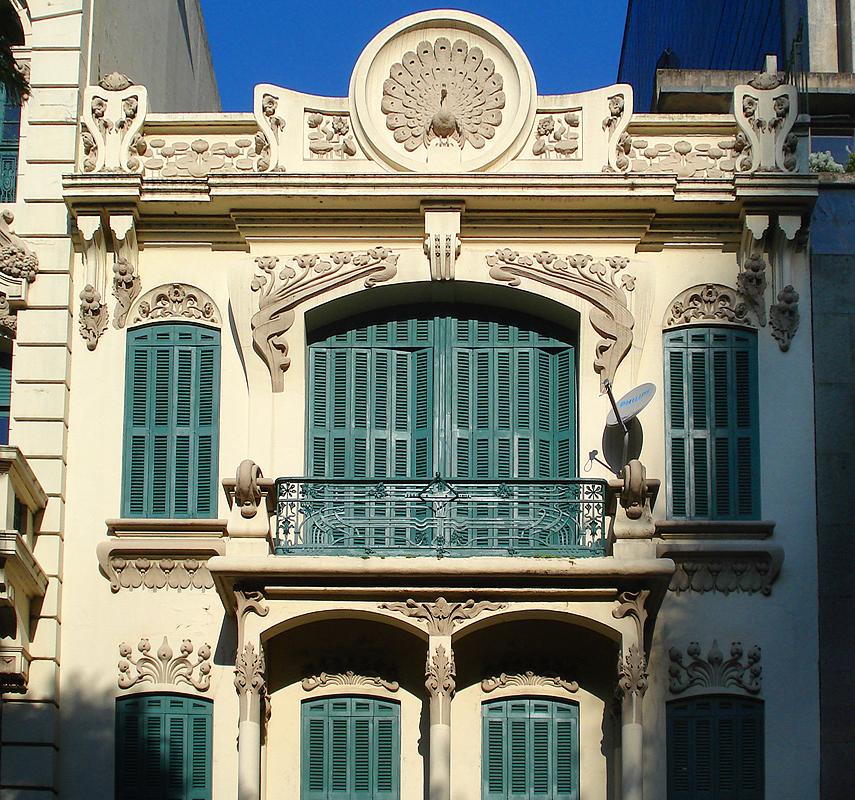
Carvalho Pharmacy

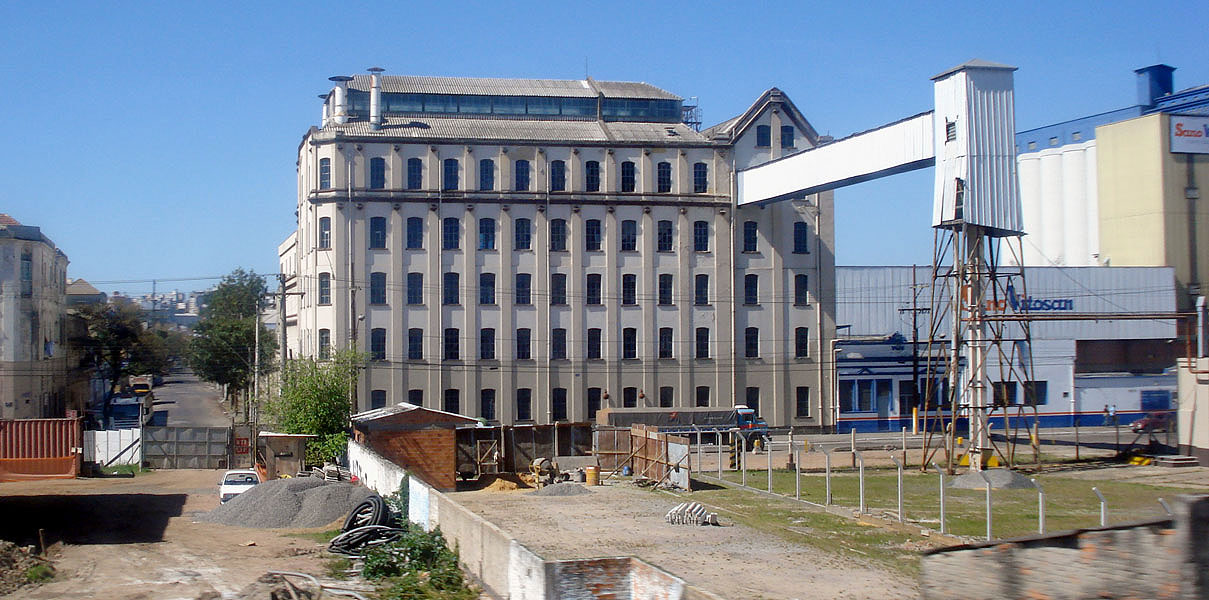
Moinho Rio-Grandense

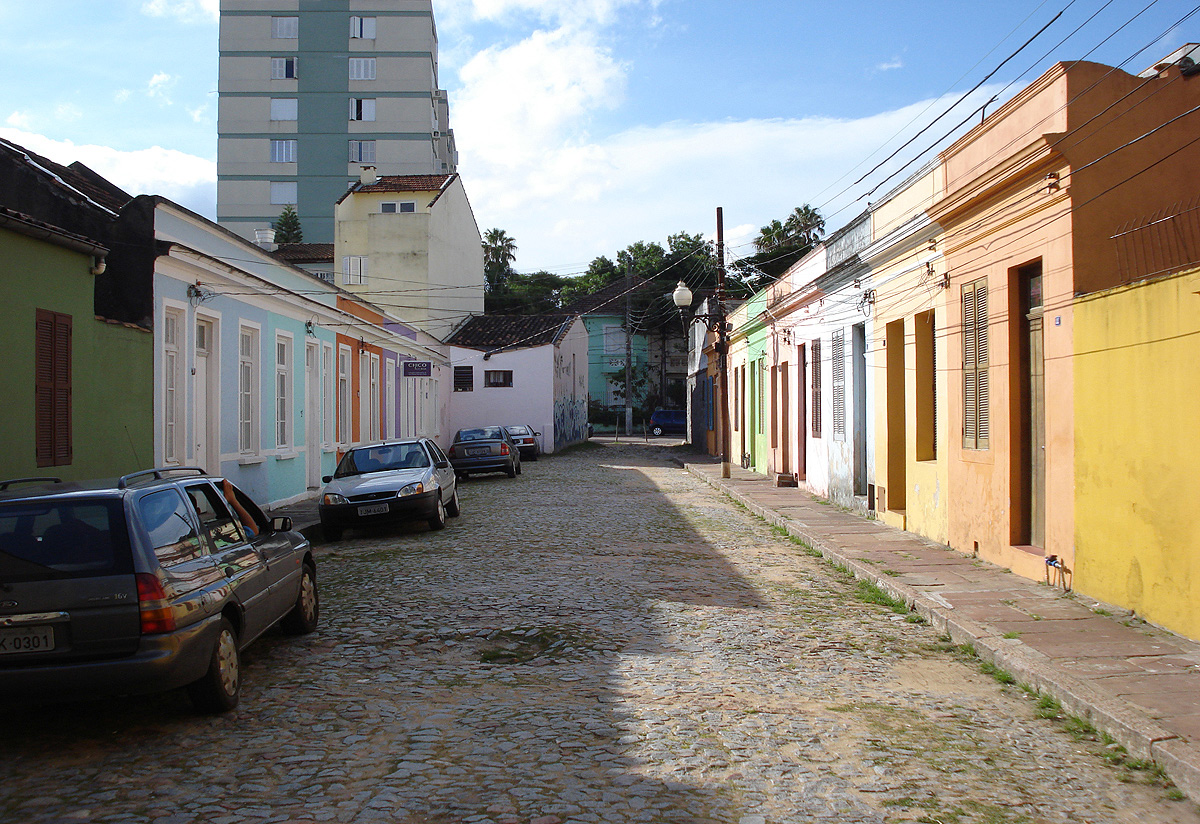
Travessa dos Venezianos

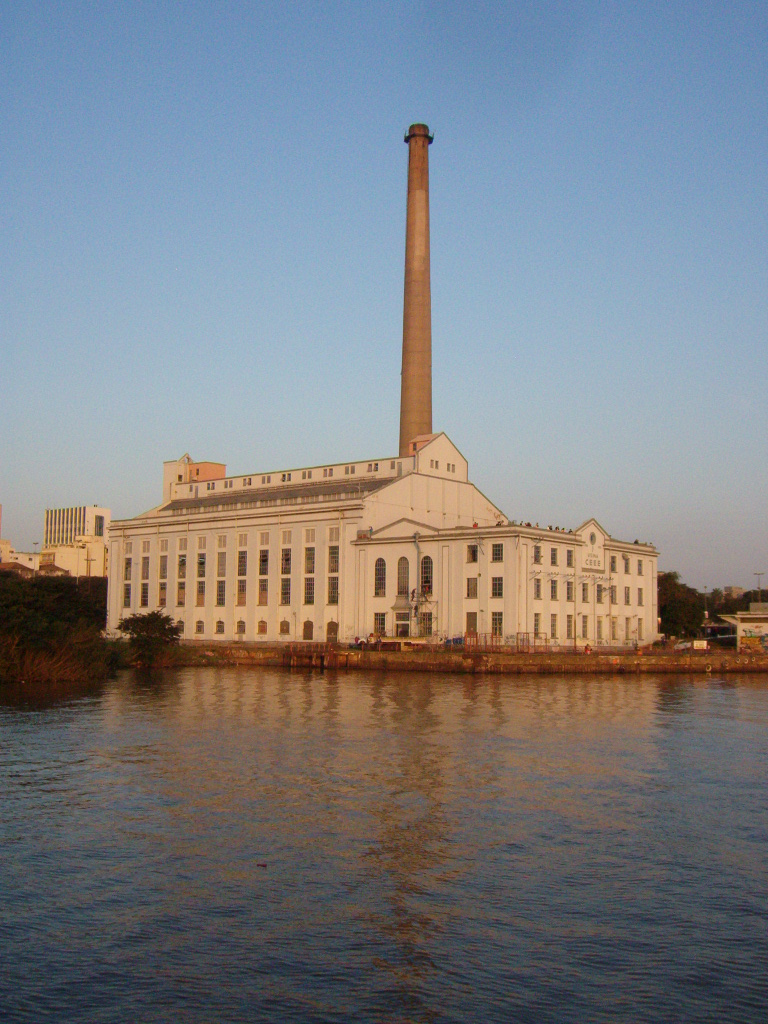
Gasômetro Power Plant

== Modernism ==
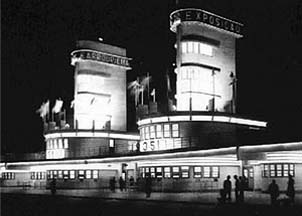
Monumental portico of the Farroupilha Centennial Fair, 1935 (demolished).

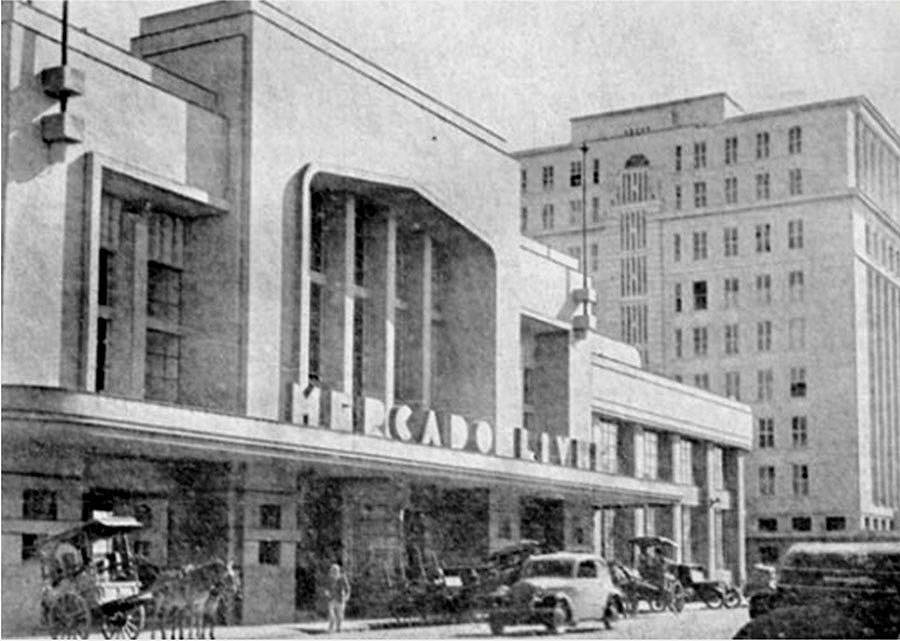
Free Market, 1930s (demolished).

According to Davit Eskinazi, it was only in the mid-1930s, more precisely on the occasion of the Farroupilha Revolution Centennial Fair in 1935, that the first examples of clearly modern architecture began to appear on the urban scene of Porto Alegre:

Reconciling the ephemeral architecture of its pavilions with some permanent elements of the future Farroupilha Park built at the same opportunity, the Centennial Exposition presented itself as the main symbol of possible and desirable modernity for the state, in a period of profound transformations for Brazilian society. Largely supported by technological resources, such as the dazzling night lighting of the event's spaces and pavilions, and driven by a well-informed Deco rhetoric, the Exposition articulated a remarkable architectural and urbanistic set that synthesized a vision of modernity committed to the neoclassical tradition, causing an unprecedented visual impact on its contemporaries. Although ephemeral, the architecture produced for the Farroupilha Centennial commemoration constitutes consistent testimony to the origins of a possible "Rio Grande do Sul path to modern architecture," traversed through an inspired and well-informed knowledge of both the proto-rationalist manifestations of the "nineteenth century," such as, for example, the Austrian "Secession" movement, and the unorthodox currents of modern architecture, such as the expressionist and futurist movements of the first decades of the twentieth century.

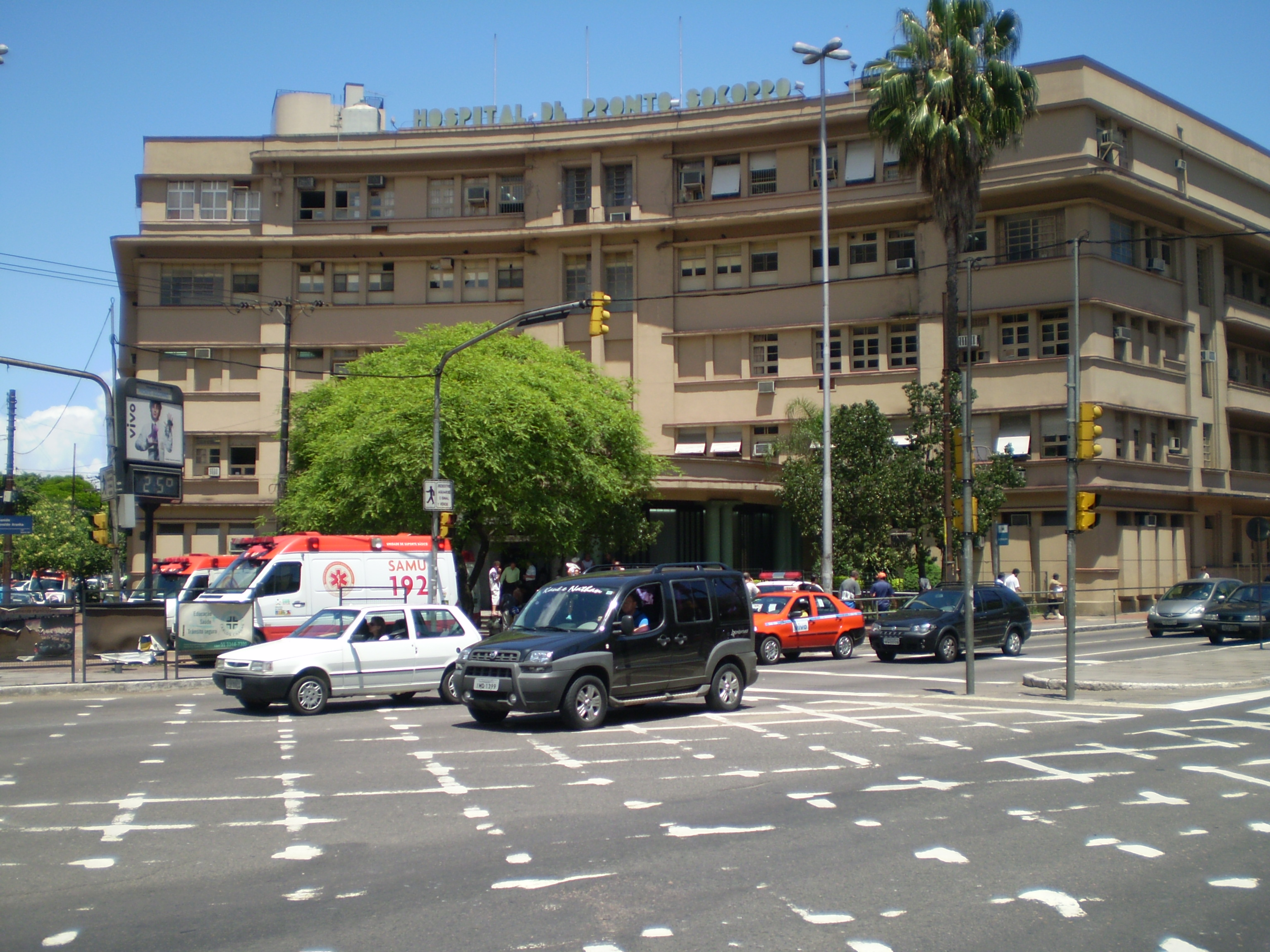
Emergency Hospital, 1944.

By the 1930s the old General Improvement Plan was obsolete, and the city required a new organization. Edvaldo Paiva and Ubatuba de Faria, city employees, and Arnaldo Gladosch, hired in Rio de Janeiro, sketched some tests of reorganization of the central urban network according to modern principles, but none was fully implemented. In parallel, another model for the city's peripheral and horizontal expansion was devised. Several neighborhoods or residential subdivisions that emerged mainly in the 1930s and 1940s proposed a local interpretation of the "garden city" prototype, with an organic layout, isolated low-scale buildings, and dense vegetation, the best examples of which are Vila Jardim, Vila Assunção, and Vila Conceição.

A decade later, everything that once was a tradition in architecture seemed to have disappeared, and the avant-garde was already working only with essential geometric shapes, stripped of all decorative artifice. In 1946, one of the first buildings erected in Porto Alegre in the typically modernist aesthetic, the Colégio Venezuela, by Demétrio Ribeiro, retained only residual traces of traditional architecture. At the same time, Edgar Graeff, a graduate of the National Faculty of Architecture at the University of Brazil, began working in the city, having had first-hand contact with the pioneers of Modernism in Brazil. His work induced a more or less general adoption of elements derived from the work of Lúcio Costa, Oscar Niemeyer, and other exponents of the Rio school, which was in turn a derivation of the Le Corbusier school. According to Carlos Goldman:

In the 1940s, Edgar Graeff contributed to the evolution of this architecture.... The impact of residences such as the one designed for Edvaldo P. Paiva was a watershed in the field of ideas, customs, and architectural culture in Porto Alegre, transposing to our local context strategies and elements of architecture that until then were used mainly by architects from Rio de Janeiro and São Paulo. Such architectural proposals locally manifested the modern thought advocated by Le Corbusier.

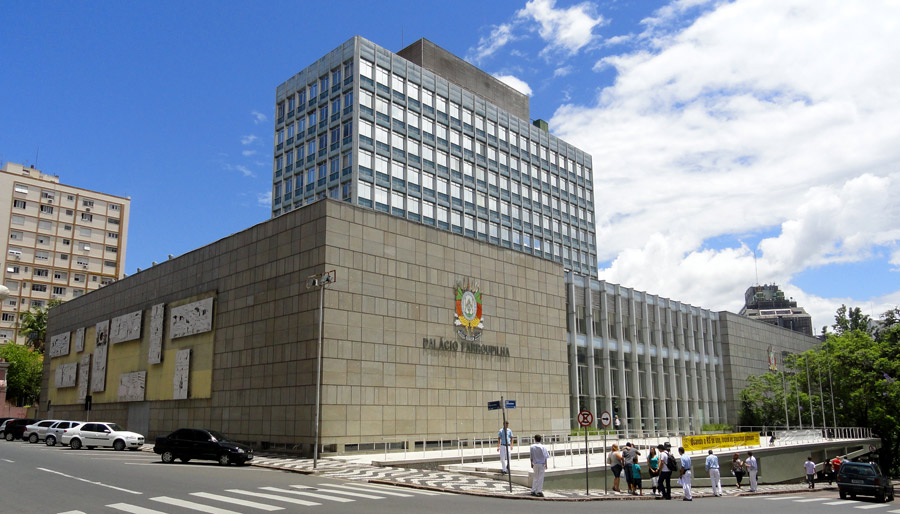
Farroupilha Palace, 1955.

Another prominent name, arriving at the same time with the same training was Carlos Alberto de Holanda Mendonça, leaving a large number of works in less than a decade of activity, some of great size. In 1948, the state department of the Institute of Architects of Brazil was created, opening a new forum for specialized debates, and in 1949 the first class of the architecture course of the Institute of Fine Arts of the UFRGS graduated, introducing a new regular flow of new and qualified professionals in the market.

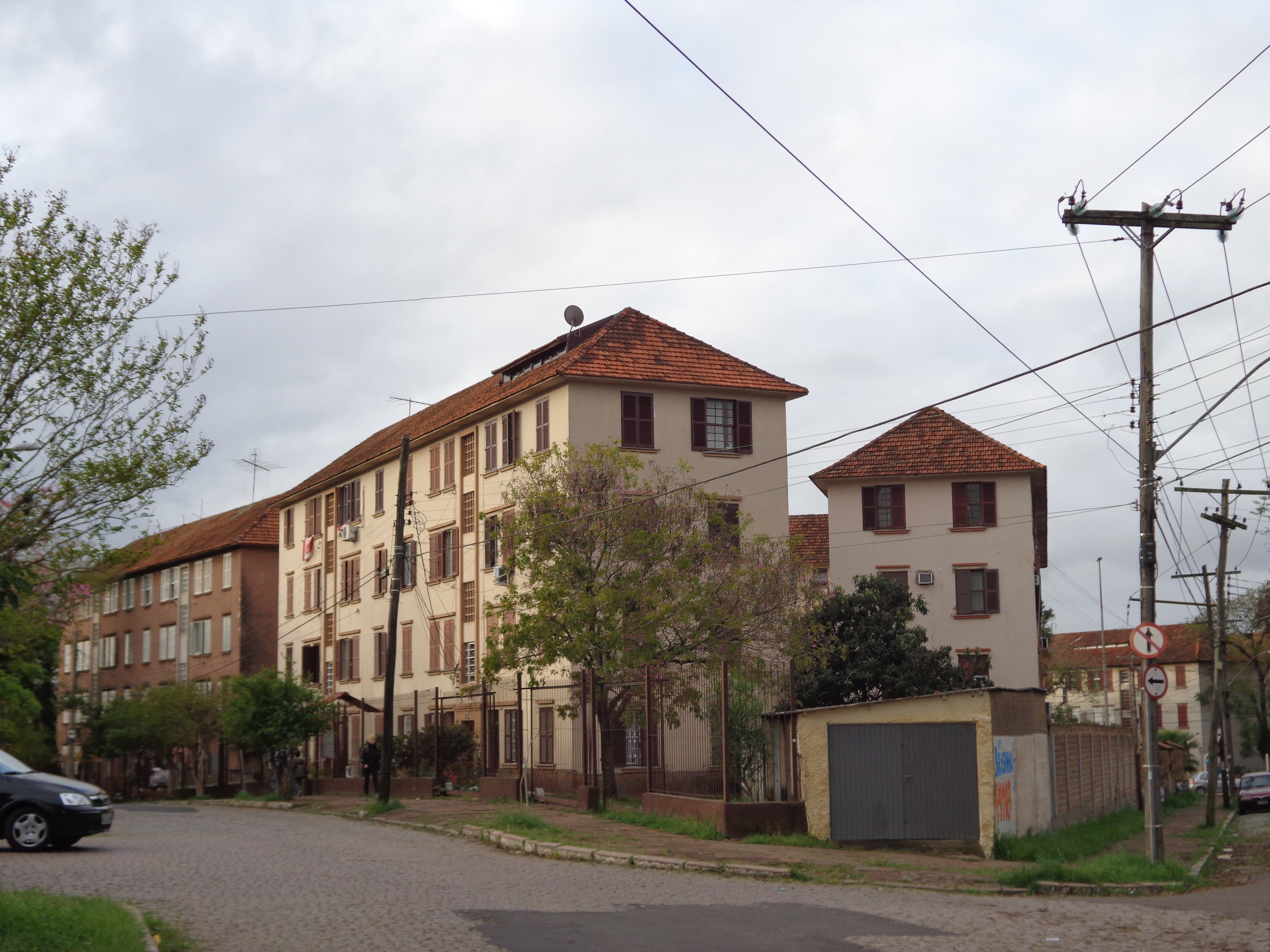
Detail of the former Passo D'Areia Residential Complex, today IAPI Village.

By the 1950s, Modernism was already well established. Examples are the Farroupilha Palace, designed by Gregório Zolko and Wolfgang Schoedon for the Legislative Assembly, and the Palace of Justice, designed by Fernando Corona and Carlos Fayet, both of which were built following entirely modernist principles. Other highlights from this phase include the Hipódromo do Cristal and the Esplanada Building, both by Uruguayan Román Fresnedo Siri; the Fêmina Hospital, by Irineu Breitman; the old headquarters of the Salgado Filho Airport, by Nelson Souza; and the initial layout of the Hospital de Clínicas, by Jorge Moreira, which, had it not been later distorted, would have been, according to Marcos da Silva, one of the architectural landmarks of the gaucho capital. By this time the urban center was already full of buildings of considerable height, with Emil Bered and Salomão Kruchin standing out as authors of several residential buildings.

The rapid population expansion was forcing urban planners to find housing solutions on a large scale. Among the initiatives to solve the problem, the Conjunto Residencial do Passo D'Areia was built, one of the most successful projects of all those executed at the time, and it was recently declared a Cultural Heritage of the city. At the end of the decade, the first Master Plan of Porto Alegre was finally implemented, composed by Edvaldo Paiva and Demétrio Ribeiro, based on the Charter of Athens, and supported by specific legislation (Law 2046/59). For Helton Bello, with this Plan, the verticalization of the city was accentuated, making Porto Alegre:

See the largest building growth in its history, which significantly altered the urban morphology... The basic principles of Modernism started to compose a legal instrument through parameters for the structuring of the city. Such standards consisted of the rationalization of activities, roads and the institution of urbanistic indexes (density, building lot potential, setbacks, and building height), which were applied according to the growth of urbanized areas.

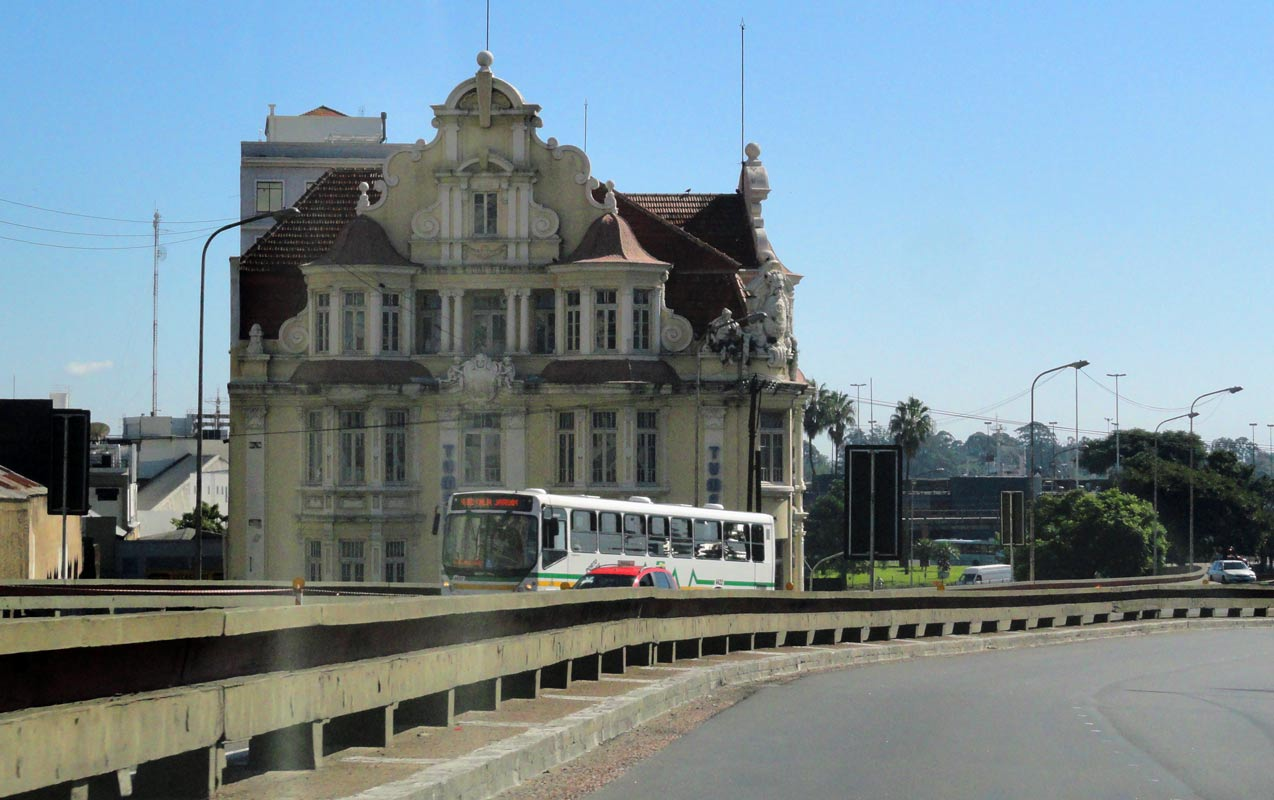
Conceição elevation surrounding Ely Building.

As an effect of Juscelino Kubitschek's developmentalism and with the addition of the patriotic feeling generated by the Brazilian Miracle after the 1964 Brazilian coup d'état, the Modernism of the Rio school gradually lost space to a brutalist variant originating in São Paulo, which by 1970 was the dominant trend throughout the country. It offered a vigorous and monumental visual appeal in a model convenient for the volume and size of the opportunities offered by the Brazilian Miracle when the country's GDP was growing at an average of 11.2% per year, and the military dictatorship intensified.

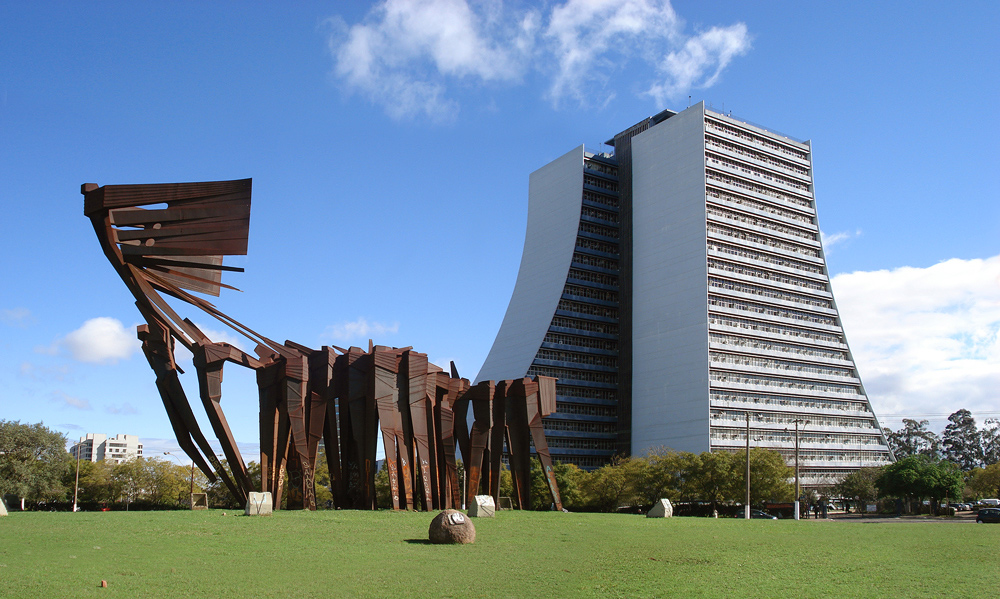
Administrative Center of the State of Rio Grande do Sul, 1971.

The verticalization accelerated, and extensive housing developments financed by the National Housing Bank were built in the suburbs. But the technical approach of the projects disregarded elementary aspects of urban landscaping and favored the de-characterization of the historic center, with the disappearance of numerous eclectic buildings, some of great value, and the last remnants of colonial architecture, both residential and public. Faced with the disregard towards the past, some intellectuals began to protest against so many demolitions, launching the seeds for the formation of a preservationist conscience that would slowly gain body among the people from Porto Alegre. And as a contradiction to the government's exacerbated patriotic program, in this period, favelas began to appear in the surrounding area. The city was thus isolated from Lake Guaíba and the port that gave it its name with the construction of an extensive wall to prevent flooding.

The modernist principles were still in use, as an extension of the Athens Charter, which was endorsed by the new Master Plan of 1979, although some innovations were introduced, such as an inspiration in the superblocks model used in Brasília and greater community participation in decisions through Municipal Councils. The overall quality of the buildings, however, declined. On the other hand, academia was already starting to review Modernism, and the influence of Uruguayan architects became significant, introducing new technical resources such as reinforced ceramics. Some of the most prominent works in this period were the State Administrative Center, by Charles Hugaud, Cairo da Silva and others; the Central Supply Station, by Carlos Fayet, Carlos Comas, and Cláudio Araújo; and the Memphis industries buildings, by Araújo and Cláudia Frota.

== Contemporaneity ==
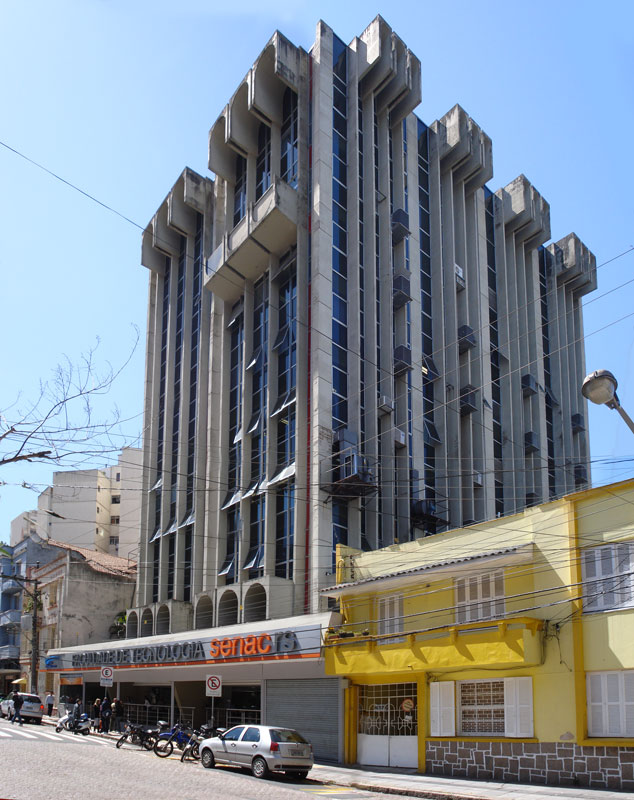
National Commercial Learning Service (SENAC) College of Technology, 1979.

The 1979 Plan was not entirely successful in its application, the new construction indexes gave rise to a series of frictions among residents of the residential zones, and between them, the public authorities and real estate agents, due to the authorization of higher buildings in predominantly one-story areas, breaking up the residential fabric of some traditional neighborhoods by buildings of up to 20 stories. The controversy led to a new reformulation of the legislation in the 1980s. It was then that it was definitively understood that a mutually comprehensive alliance would be necessary not only between architecture and urbanism for a harmonious general growth, but also to attract other areas of knowledge to the discussion and to imagine solutions that were more dynamic, realistic and adaptable to the increasingly fluent profile of society, developing strategic plans based on the axes of structuring and urban mobility, the forms of private land use, environmental qualification, economic promotion and a series of more up-to-date planning criteria, taking into account aspects of collective memory, cultural identity, and human coexistence. The success of proposals in this direction over the years, including new revisions of the Master Plan, has proven to be very controversial, with progress and throwbacks. There are still zones of problematic occupation, real estate speculation continues to pressure public authorities and influence decisions, and serious problems of popular housing remain to be solved.

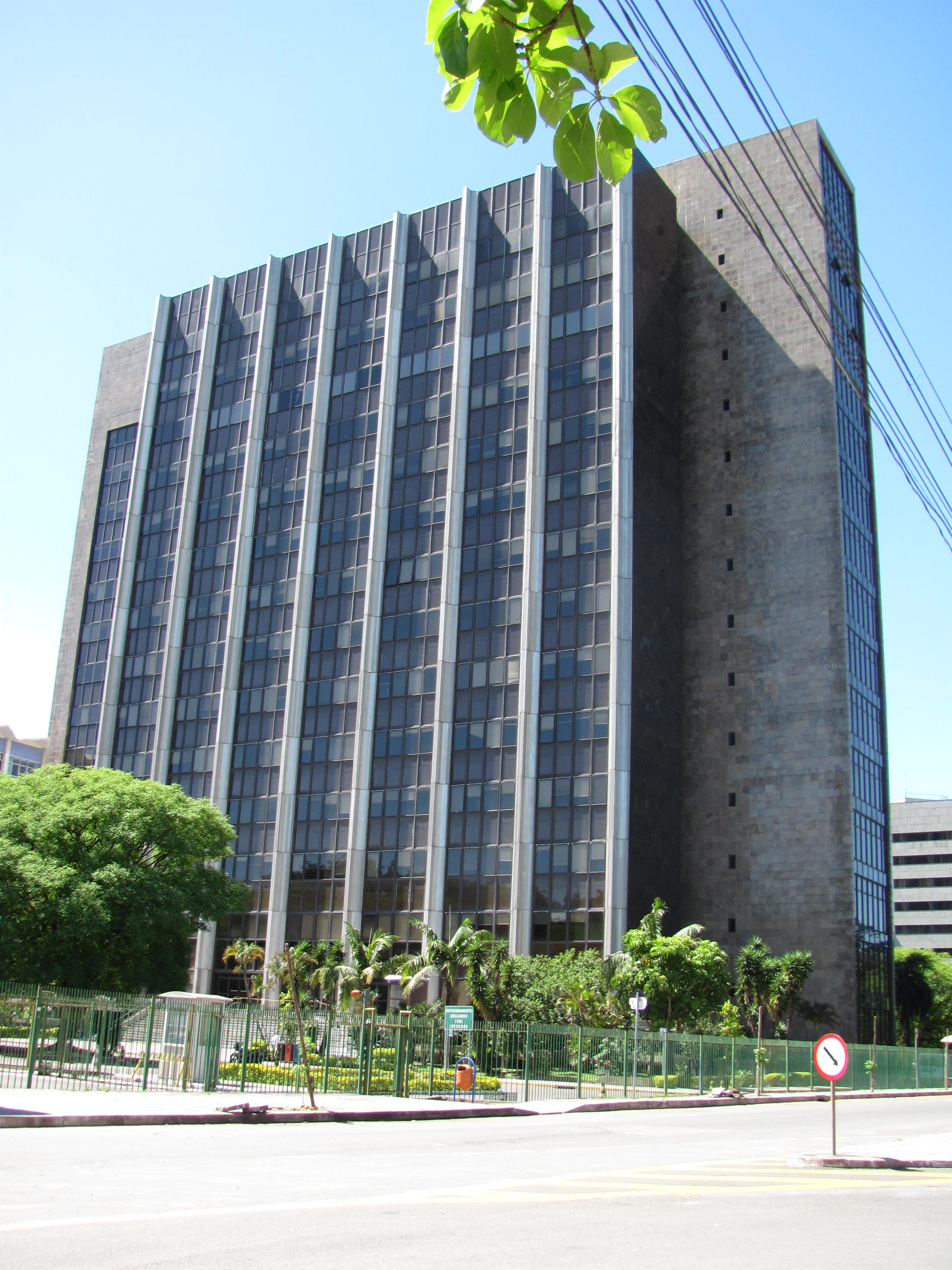
The IRS building, nicknamed "Chocolatão" ("big chocolate"), the 1980s.

In parallel, with the creation in 1981 of the Historical and Cultural Heritage Team, shortly afterward linked to the Coordination of Cultural Memory of the Municipal Secretariat of Culture, a process of study and rescue of the cultural assets owned by the Municipality of special historical, social, and architectural interest was started, systematizing the municipal registrations, which had started a few years before, in 1979. This performance was strengthened by the installation of IPHAN's regional office, taking care of national interests in the area of historical heritage throughout the state, and of the Coordenadoria do Patrimônio Histórico e Artístico do Estado ("State Historical and Artistic Heritage Coordination'), IPHAE's predecessor, both in 1979. These institutions have been carrying out several federal and state level preservation actions in the city. The existence of the "historic center" was also recognized, and conservation and sustainable development measures were proposed, as well as other stabilized areas such as the "garden-city" neighborhoods and areas of special cultural interest.

A new consciousness towards old buildings and green areas was born, and many secular buildings that were on the demolition list were saved. The case of the Capela do Bonfim is exemplary in this sense. After many years of abandonment and degradation, it caught fire in what was suspected to be arson. Important elements were lost, such as the carved retable, and under the pretext of being too ruined, it was almost demolished, but society reacted, and all the subsequent commotion contributed to an imprint in everyone's conscience, citizens, and public power, of the value of memory, art, history and its material testimonies. The chapel was eventually listed and restored in 1983.

However, the performance of the institutions of historic heritage preservation is still frequently hampered by opposing private interests, by the slowness of the processes of listing, and by a chronic insufficiency of funds. Thus, even though the work in this direction has advanced much, with the intensification of municipal actions and the recent listing of more than 130 buildings of the historic center by the Monumenta Program, of the Ministry of Culture, the public powers still have taken a long time to protect buildings of the importance of the Conceição Church and the Catedral-Cúria complex (listed in 2007 and 2009 respectively). Also, that buildings which already are protected are being demolished even with the legal instruments established, and that a number of other historic buildings still do not receive any official care.

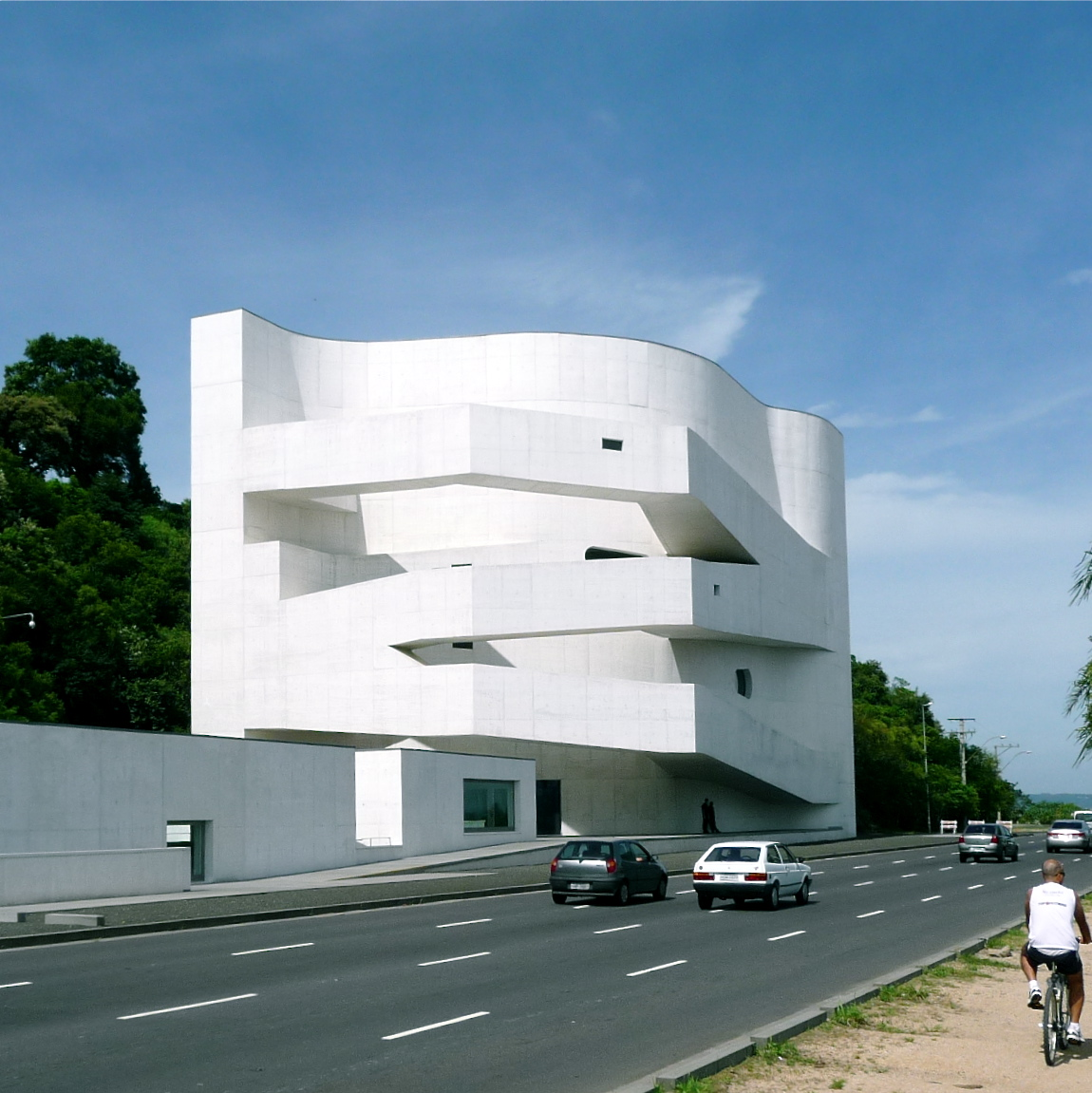
Iberê Camargo Foundation

In aesthetic terms, in the last decades, there has been a decline of the Modernist school and its replacement by the values of Post-Modernism, re-reading historical styles, and creating a new sense of eclecticism, freedom, and formal democracy. The most paradigmatic examples of this trend are the shopping centers that in recent years have punctuated the landscape, many of them with bold formal solutions, extravagant decoration, and a high-tech spirit.

Some critics refuse to recognize a truly living architecture in the present in Porto Alegre, no longer find works that can stand as cultural references and urban landmarks, and denounce an identity crisis in local production. But for others, the high level of debate about architecture, which attracts international personalities, the success of revitalization projects of old areas and structures by local architects, such as the Nova Olaria Shopping Center, and the work in the city of renowned foreign designers, such as Álvaro Siza, responsible for the Iberê Camargo Foundation building - considered a masterpiece - indicates that Porto Alegre's architecture maintains an appreciable dynamism and is integrated to what is happening in the rest of the world. This most recent phase in the evolution of Porto Alegre's architecture is, however, still in need of further study and documentation.

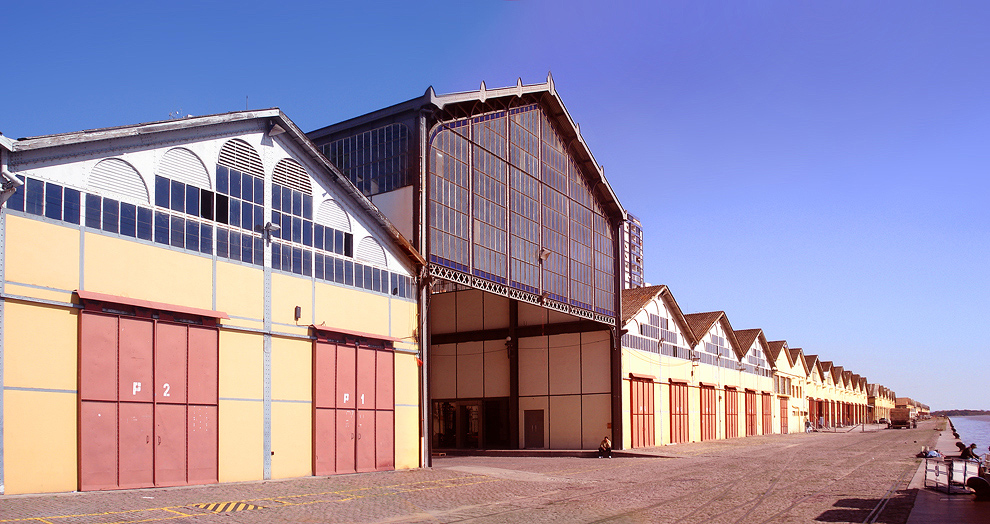
Mauá Pier

In recent years, the public administration has undertaken major infrastructure renovation works, in terms of urban mobility, urban planning of public spaces, green areas, and others. The works for the 2014 World Cup have become notorious, however, at the same time that the official instances make great propaganda of this activity, pointing to alleged economic, social, environmental, and cultural benefits, criticism mounts: Accusations of technical errors, various irregularities, corruption, and human rights violations multiply, and influential sectors of the population claim that they are not being heard, triggering many protests, which have sometimes ended in violence.

Examples are "urban revitalization" projects such as that of Cais Mauá ("Mauá Pier"), the Historic Center, and the former Industrial District (4th District), as well as state and municipal programs to grant parks, squares, and cultural facilities to private investors. The latter produced controversies, being accused of promoting gentrification of selected areas and commodifying public spaces, and enriching entrepreneurs to the detriment of the real interests of the population, especially the poorest. Associated with this model of urban renewal, which has persisted for many years, come real estate speculation, threats to the quality of life and historical heritage, dismantling of the Master Plan, and governance of the environment. Since 2021, there has been only one municipal secretariat to manage the areas of Environment, Urbanism, Sustainability, and Historic Heritage.

Mayor Sebastião Melo promised in January 2022 to send a new "very liberal" Master Plan to the City Council, and that in the meantime he will try to introduce punctual changes. Interviewed on the occasion, Melo said that "our government is very liberal in the economy, liberal for the entrepreneur, in opening businesses, but has a very strong eye for the social." There is criticism that several large urbanistic projects have been approved contrary to the Master Plan and environmental norms. In the opinion of André Augustin, from the Observatório das Metrópoles, there is "strong state action to build a city that generates profit for certain sectors. If anyone has doubts about who are the beneficiaries of this real estate valorization policy, just look at the campaign financing data released by TSE ("Superior Electoral Court"). Among the biggest donors to Melo's 2020 campaign are partners from companies like Goldztein, Cyrela, Melnick, CFL, Multiplan, and Arado Empreendimentos. It is for these that Porto Alegre is governed, whether in transportation policy, sanitation, or changes in the Master Plan." Despite all the advances, the housing deficit remains: According to IBGE, 192,885 people were still living in the city's 108 favelas in 2010, without access to essential services.

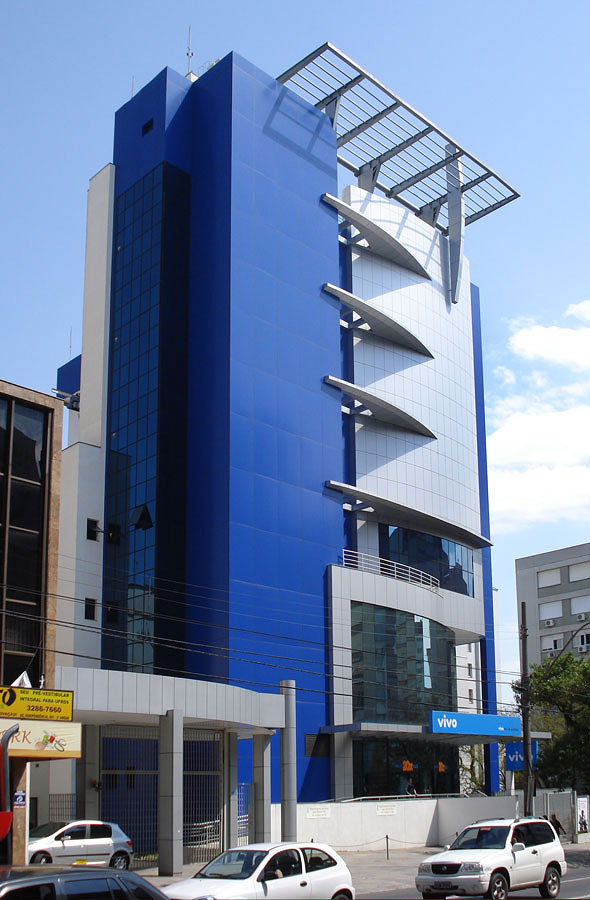
Headquarters of the telephone company Vivo

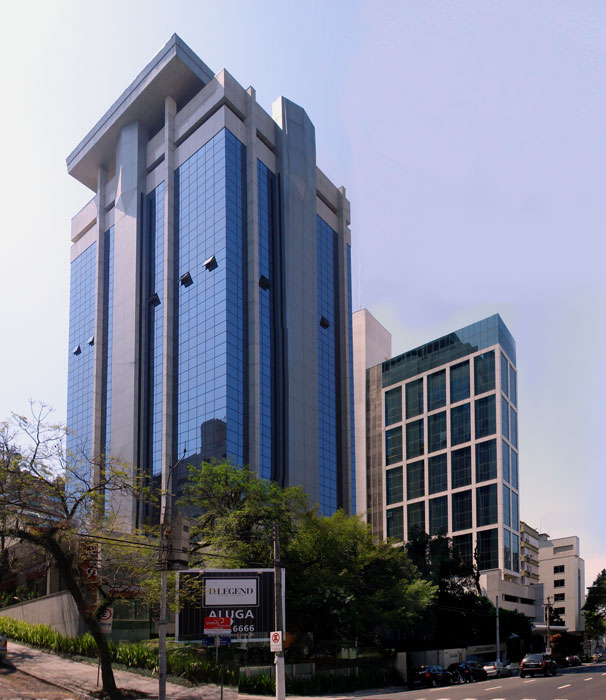
Mostardeiro Business Center

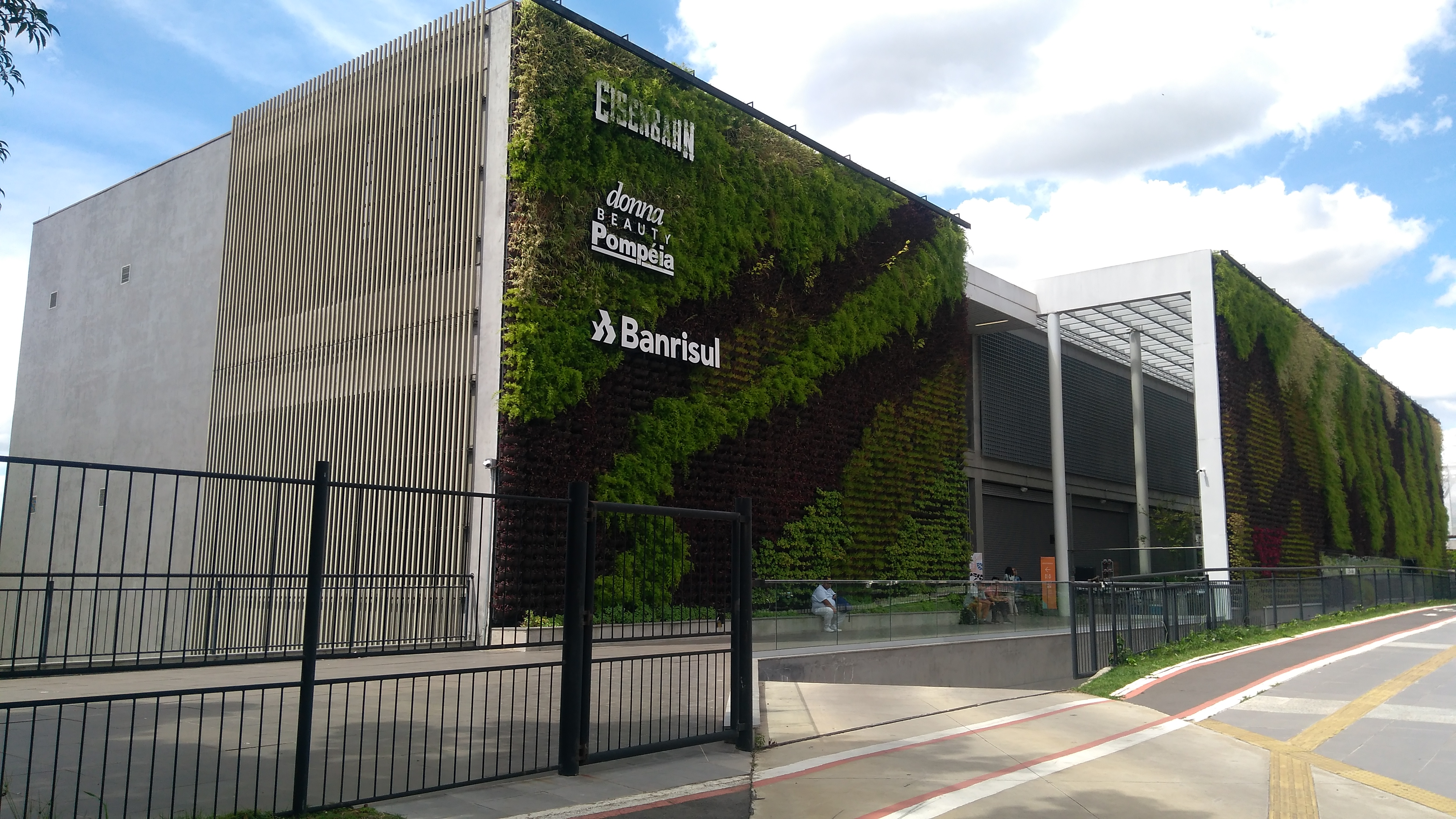
Building at the Unisinos Campus in Porto Alegre

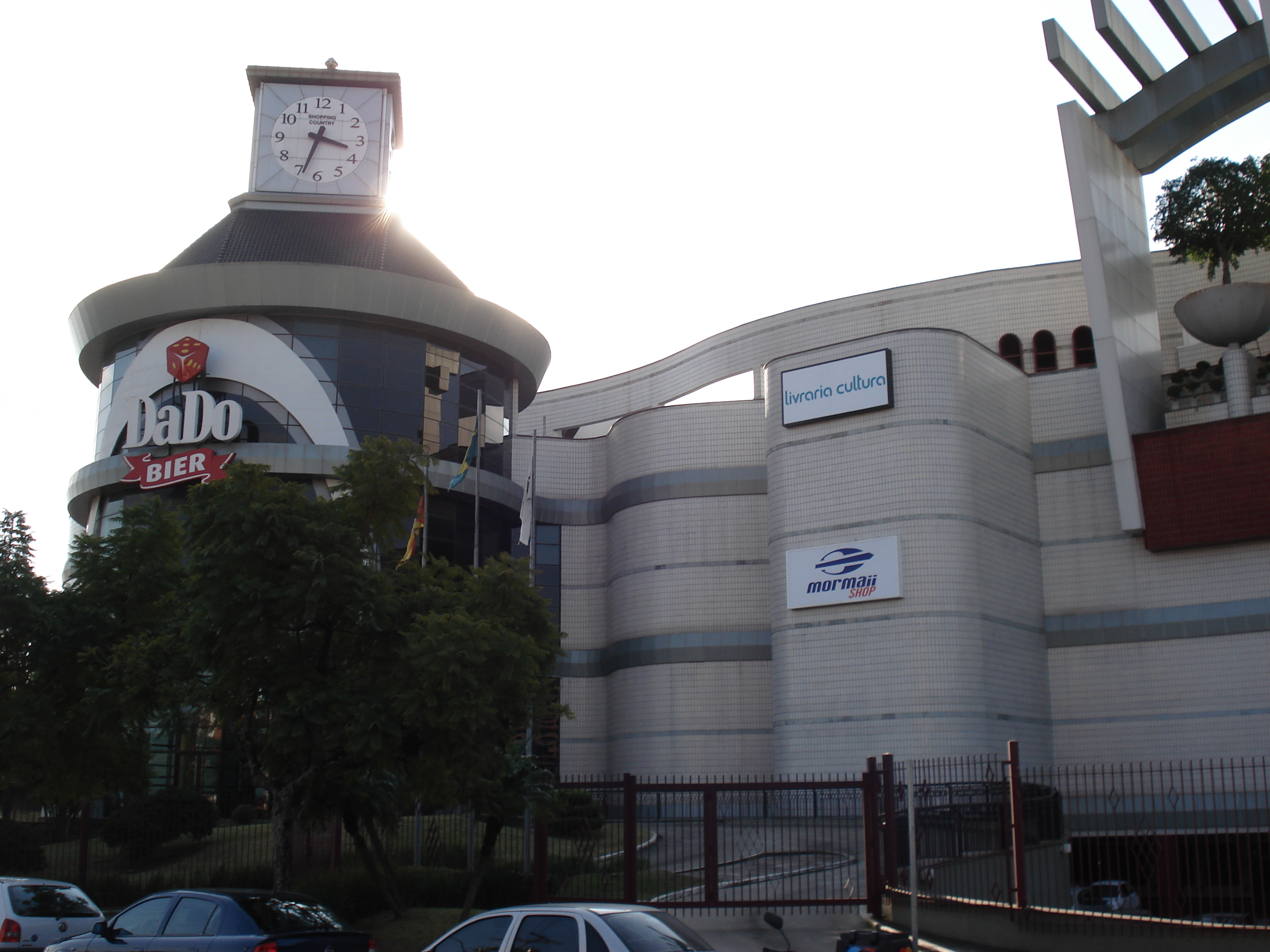
Bourbon Country Shopping Center

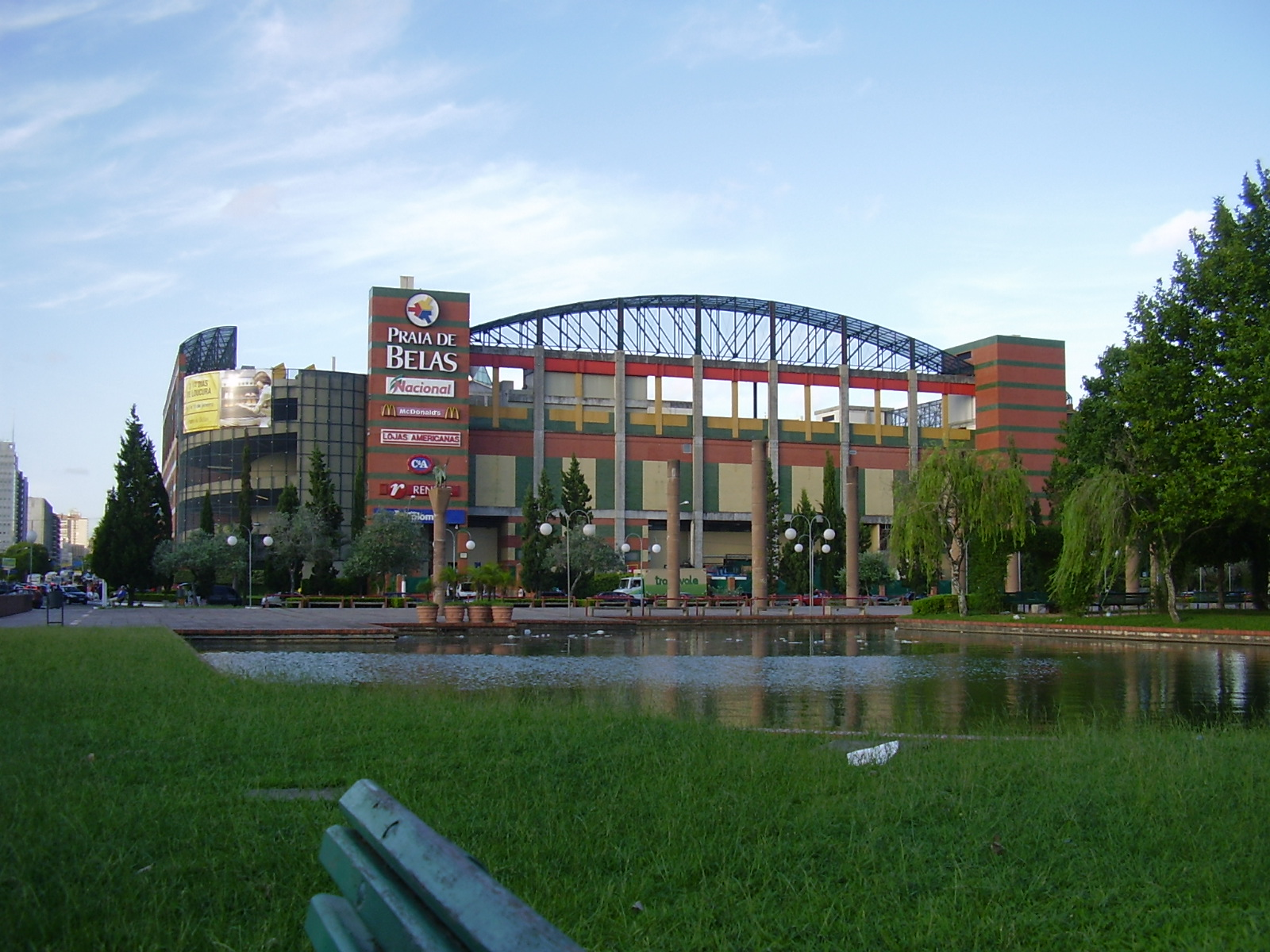
Shopping Center Praia de Belas

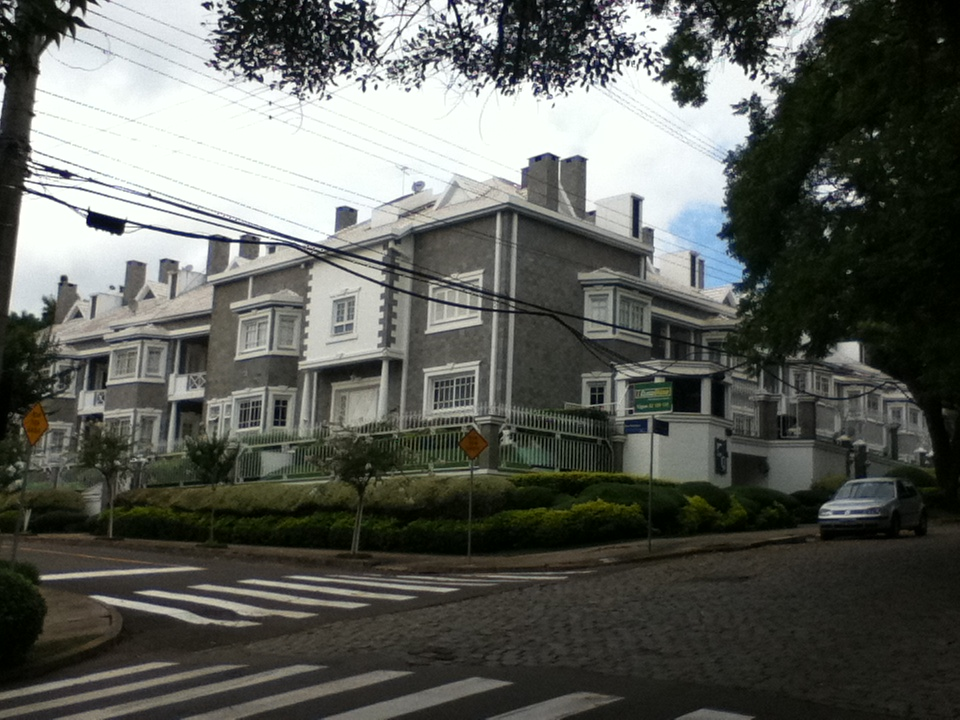
Residential condominium in the Três Figueiras Neighbourhood

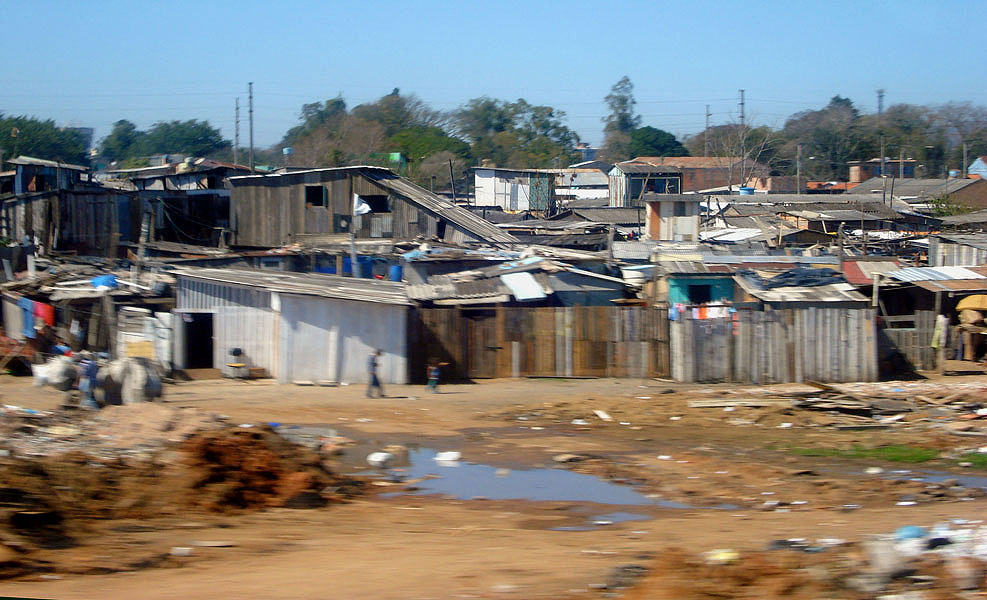
Slum corridor at the entrance of the city

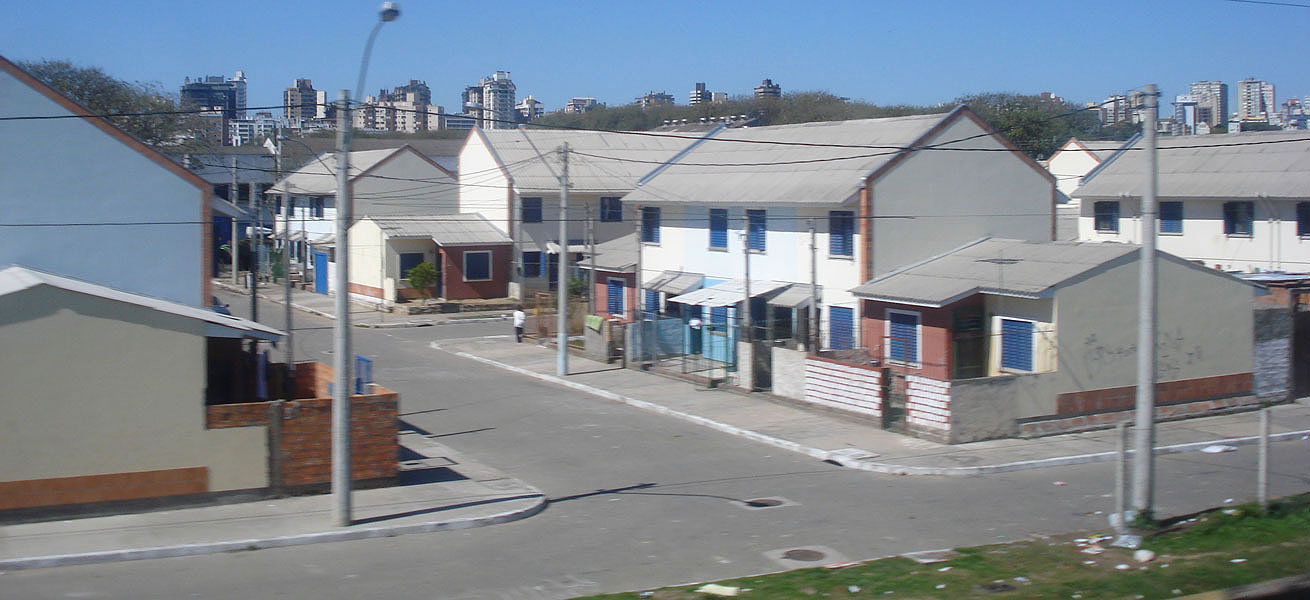
Vila dos Papeleiros low-income housing complex

== See also ==
- Architecture of Brazil
