= Sete de Setembro Street =

Street in Rio Grande do Sul, Brazil

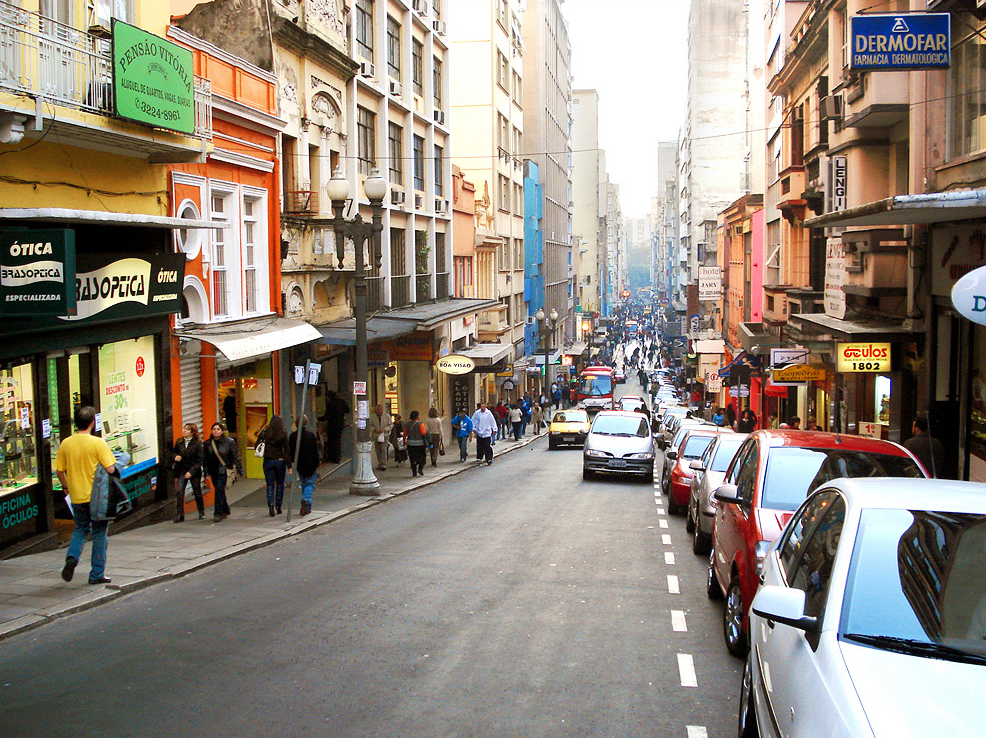
- Sete de Setembro Street in the 2000s.
- Interactive map of Sete de Setembro Street
- Former name: Rua Nova da Praia
- Location: Porto Alegre, Rio Grande do Sul; Brazil
- Coordinates: 30°01′48″S 51°13′58″W

Sete de Setembro Street (Portuguese: Rua Sete de Setembro) is located in the historic center of Porto Alegre, capital of the Brazilian state of Rio Grande do Sul.

== History ==
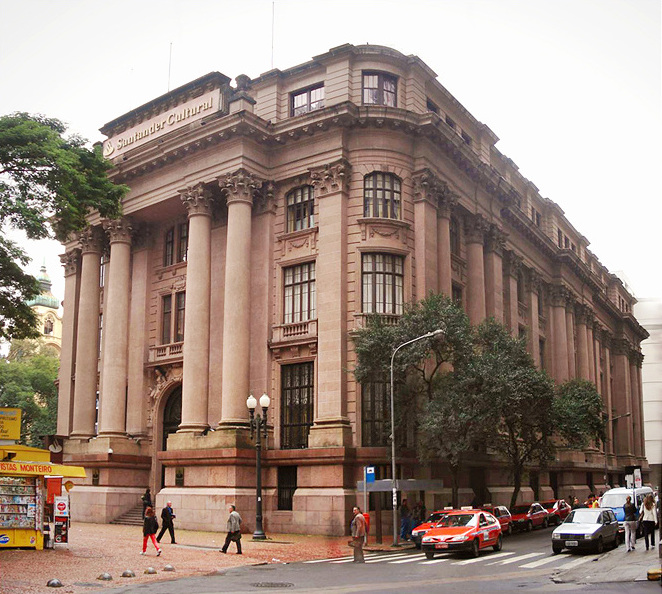
Former headquarters of Banco da Província, now Santander Cultural.

At first, the street comprised a path along the shore of Guaíba, which ran along the back of the houses that bordered Rua da Praia. In the 19th century, it split into two sections: Porto dos Ferreiros (between Beco do João Inácio and Largo do Paraíso) and Beco da Rua Clara or Beco dos Marinheiros (near Rua Clara), where a wall was erected to serve as an anchorage. In 1842, Beco dos Marinheiros was dismantled. In 1844, it became Rua Nova da Praia, the first official name. In 1846, boat access ramps were built and the owners of the land along the way were obliged to build sidewalks. In 1847, landowners were required to build walls along the lake.

The street began to be occupied by large commercial houses. The layout was determined in the 1850 urban plan, but was extended shortly afterwards to the Market Square, which led to the expropriation of the area of the current Montevideo Square. On March 26, 1856, it was renamed Rua da Alfândega. In 1860, it was leveled and received urbanization improvements on the western stretch, including graveling, embankments, retaining walls and wharves. The dock at Alfândega Square was built, improving the safety of the entire route. On August 17, 1865, it received the current name in honor of the day of Brazil's Proclamation of Independence.

Throughout the 20th century, several important buildings were built in the area, such as the Banco da Província and the Majestic Hotel. Other notable architectural structures are the City Hall, the Tax Office, the Post Office and the Previdência do Sul. Currently, Sete de Setembro Street is one of the city's financial centers, housing banks and other financial institutions.

== See also ==
- Architecture of Porto Alegre
- History of Porto Alegre
