= Clube do Comércio =

Brazilian association

Coordinates: 30.0304°S 51.2308°W

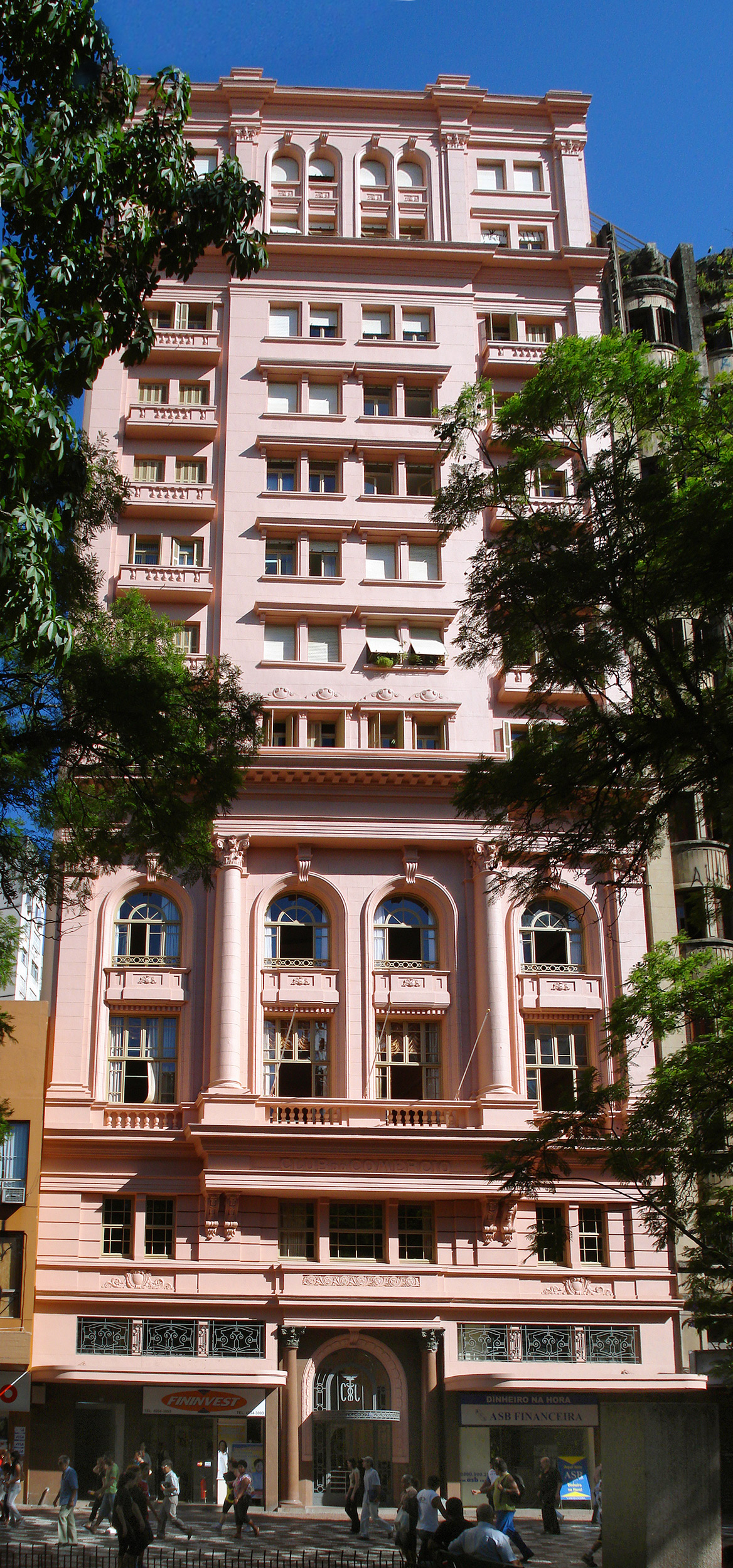
- The headquarters, previously known as the Rosado Palace.
- Interactive map of the Clube do Comércio area

General information
- Location: Porto Alegre, Rio Grande do Sul; Brazil
- Inaugurated: June 7th, 1896

Website
- https://www.clubedocomerciopoa.com.br/

Clube do Comércio (English: Commerce Club) is based in the Brazilian city of Porto Alegre, in the state of Rio Grande do Sul. Founded in 1896, it is one of the city's most traditional clubs. The headquarters, located on Andradas Street, was listed as a landmark site by the Porto Alegre City Hall in 1996.

== History ==
Clube do Comércio was founded on June 7, 1896, on the initiative of 52 merchants, mostly of German origin and educated in Germany. Upon creation, it incorporated the former Clube Comercial. The preparatory session minutes were signed by Emílio da Silva Tavares, then president of the Clube Comercial. The first president was Vítor Barreto de Oliveira and the first headquarters were located in Sete de Setembro Street, where Santander Cultural is currently located. On May 1, 1902, the Rio-Grandense Academy of Letters was installed in its premises.

Journalist Carlos Augusto de Bissón described the club as "very traditional" and "the most prestigious society in Porto Alegre". It became one of the most important meeting places for influential politicians and businessmen, hosting large balls and banquets. Literary soirees, concerts and art exhibitions were held in the halls, adorned with paintings and gilding. An article in the magazine Máscara in 1919 describes the great Peace Ball:

At the door of the Club, a crowd had parked, forming lines for the passage of luxury cars, from which disembarked elegant ladies and gentlemen. The entrance to the club, illuminated with exquisite taste, featured fairytale symbols that faded and rekindled in different colors, as if blown by a gust of wind. [...] Once the concert was over, the rooms began to fill up with beautiful and elegant people, ladies and gentlemen of impeccable line. The most representative figures of our aristocracy were present, displaying a dazzling luxury, with the glitter of jewels, the discreet nudity of necklines and the magnetism of gallantry.

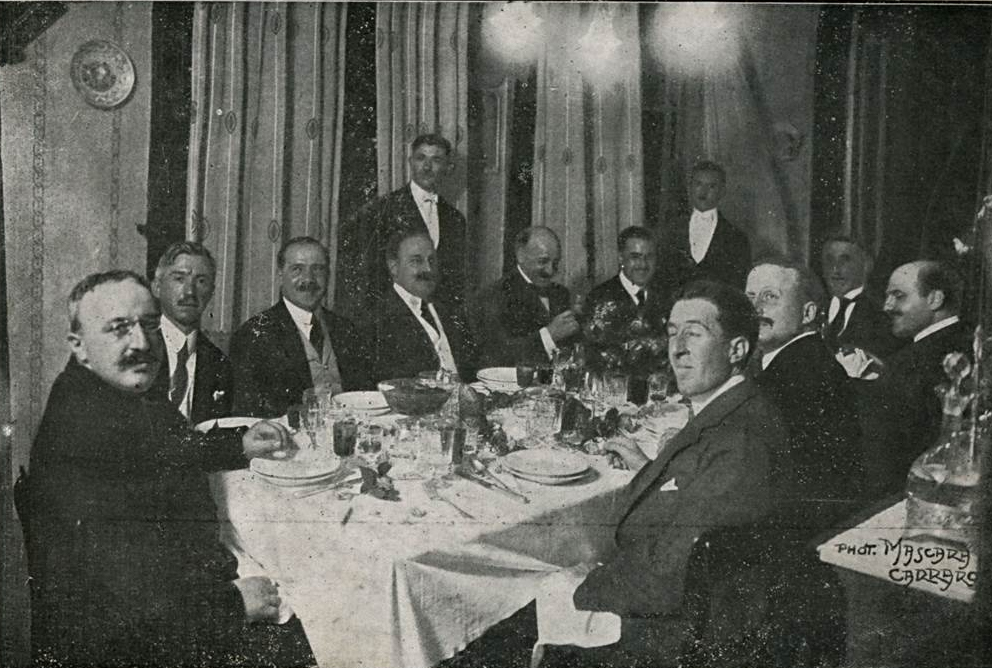
Banquet in honor of the Italian Embassy, 1918.

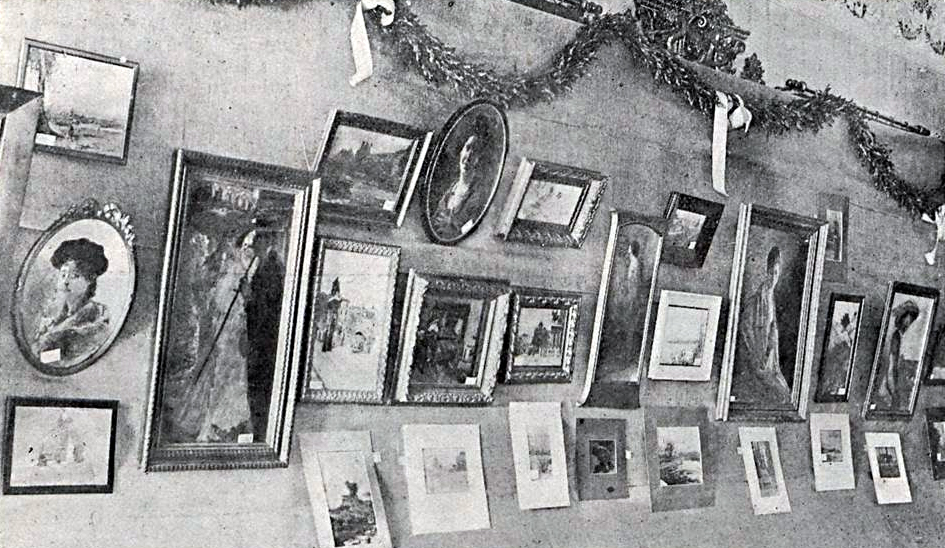
Exhibition by Eugenio Latour, 1919.

On November 7, 1930, the Centro da Indústria Fabril do Rio Grande do Sul, predecessor of Federação das Indústrias do Estado do Rio Grande do Sul (FIERGS), was founded on the site. The construction of the former Banco da Província building, now Santander Cultural, forced the members to find a new location for their own headquarters. The new building on Andradas Street, opposite Alfândega Square, surpassed in height all the other constructions in Porto Alegre. On April 19, 1937, the contract was awarded to Dahne, Conceição e Cia.; the foundation stone was laid on June 23, 1938, and the inauguration occurred on December 16, 1940. The eclectic style building with strong Art Deco predominance was called Rosado Palace. The Clube do Comércio was Revista do Globo's favorite place to show the sociability of Porto Alegre's bourgeoisie.

In 1943, a sports and leisure center was acquired with the incorporation of the Clube Excursionista e Esportivo. In the same year, the first debutante ball in the state was held at the venue, which launched a trend that attracted the maidens of high society and continues to this day. A small crowd used to gather in front of the entrance to watch the debutantes arrive. Between the 1940s and 1950s, the club practically monopolized the social life of Porto Alegre's elite.

An artistic and cultural program continued to be developed, including art and antiques exhibitions and charity events. Prominent poets, chroniclers and novelists met in the salons. In 1955, one of the salons hosted the first public television demonstration in the city. From the 1960s onwards, concerts were held with Brazilian popular music stars such as Elis Regina, Vinícius de Moraes, Toquinho, Wanderléia and Erasmo Carlos. The salons also gathered influential politicians. Between the 1970s and 1980s, it was one of the city's main art galleries, managed by Fábio Coutinho.

Currently, the clubhouse has a complete structure for holding events of different kinds, including a garage, several lounges, a library, a restaurant and games and lounge rooms. The sports complex, located on Bastian Avenue, offers a sports and leisure infrastructure with four outdoor and two indoor tennis courts, two children's swimming pools, a semi-Olympic swimming pool, a futsal court, a beauty salon, a gym, a sauna, a restaurant, barbecue facilities and a cable TV system. It also runs a Tennis School, a Futsal School, swimming lessons, aqua aerobics, weight training, gymnastics, yoga, samba and capoeira.

== Historic building ==
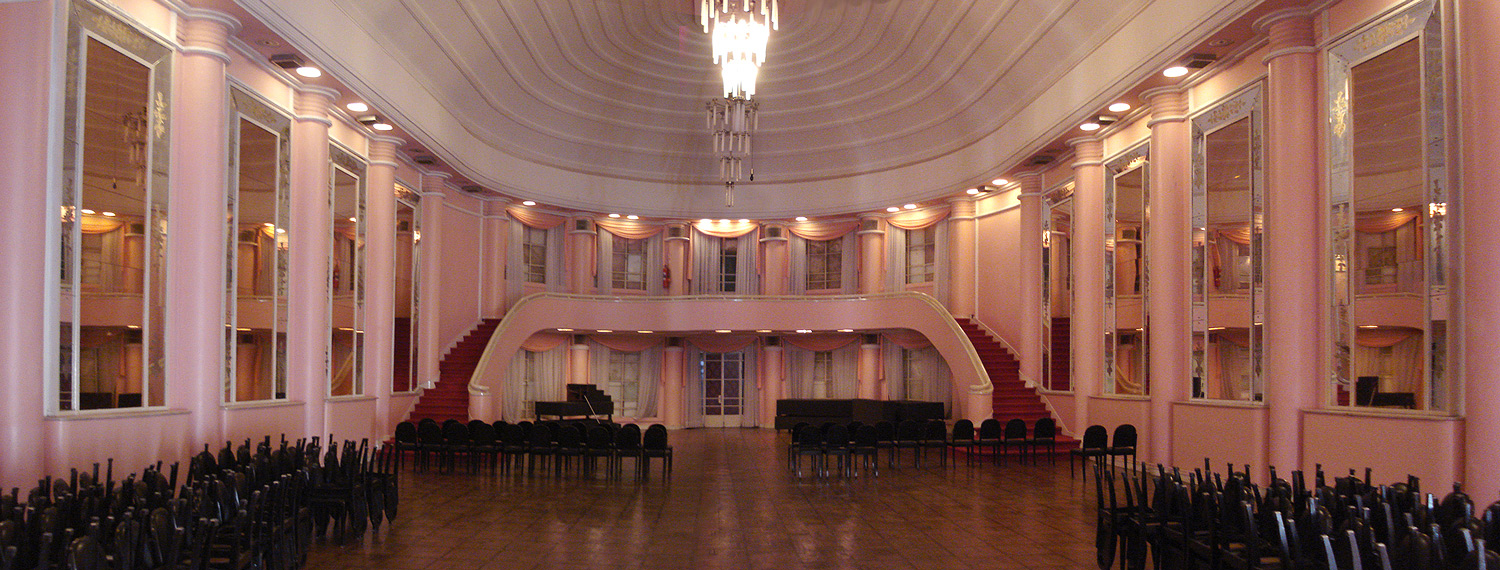
Ballroom.

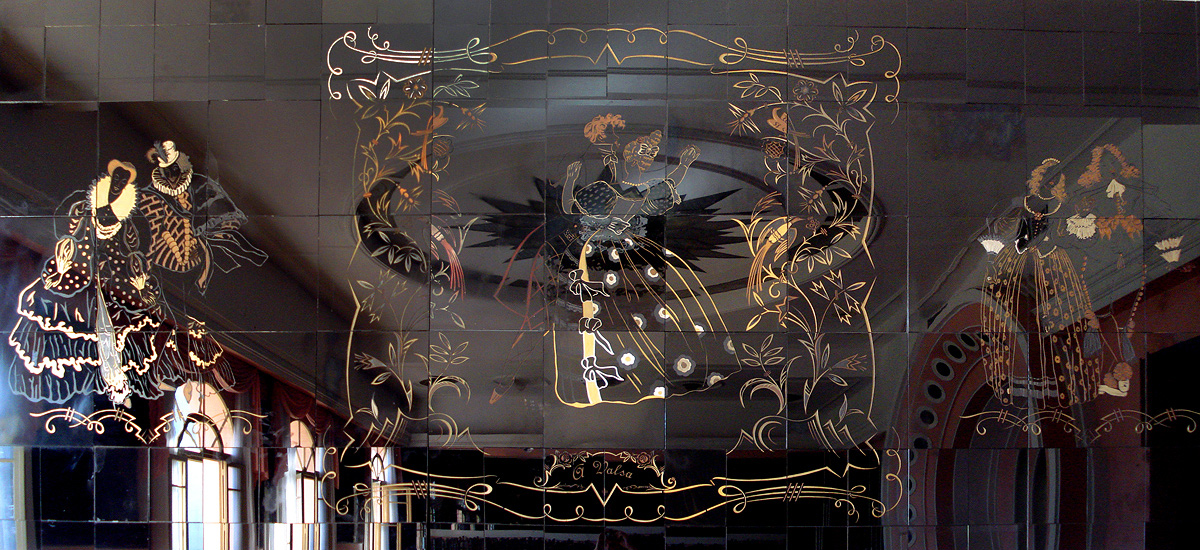
Black crystal panel showing aristocrats dancing in the Crystal Hall.

The clubhouse in Andradas Street is one of the richest and best-preserved examples of the Art Deco style in the city. The building comprises 13 floors clad externally in pink sirex, but only the first four are used by the club. The first floor is occupied by small stores covered by a plain porch, bordered by a round arched doorway with two granite Corinthian columns and a wrought iron door. On the upper floor there are two series of small windows, the lower ones with ornamental grilles and the upper ones with wooden frames.

A portico rises above with a pair of large Corinthian columns that cross two floors and frames two groups of windows, the lower rectangular and the upper arched, with two similar superimposed windows on either side of the portico. This is followed by a large cornice decorated with small corbels. Six floors up, the arrangement consists of a central block with two double windows and doors opening onto balconies with blind balustrade parapets.

The final block consists of two floors with double windows on the sides and two groups of double windows in the central block, with the upper ones arched between prominent Corinthian pilasters. A plain cornice completes the ensemble. The following spaces stand out:

- Vestibule: a long corridor with marble floors and Art Deco chandeliers that leads to the main lobby with a black and white marble staircase on the left with large stained glass windows on the wall, a geometric floor, a reception desk and the elevators, framed in a black marble box;
- First floor: lobby with decorated parquet floors and leather furniture from the 1940s. It includes the former French Billiards Room, now occupied by the Exhibition Hall, and the Board Room, with 19th century furniture;
- Second floor: includes the Reading Room and the library, furnished with Art Deco objects, works of art and wooden mosaic floors. The Winter Garden has hydraulic tile flooring;
- Third floor: the old Dancing Room, now known as the Crystal Room, features a series of gold-engraved black crystal panels imported from Europe depicting scenes of aristocrats dancing, a large door under a circular frame and a star-embossed ceiling. It also features the Ballroom with a ceiling in the shape of a ribbed ellipsoidal dome, large antique chandeliers, recessed lights, mirrors on the walls and a mezzanine, as well as semicircular nooks and a checkroom.

The building has been listed as a landmark site by Porto Alegre City Hall since 1996. A restoration program began in 2002 with funds from the Monumenta Program and finished in 2008.

== See also ==
- History of Porto Alegre
- Architecture of Porto Alegre
