= Banco da Província =

Defunct Brazilian banking institution

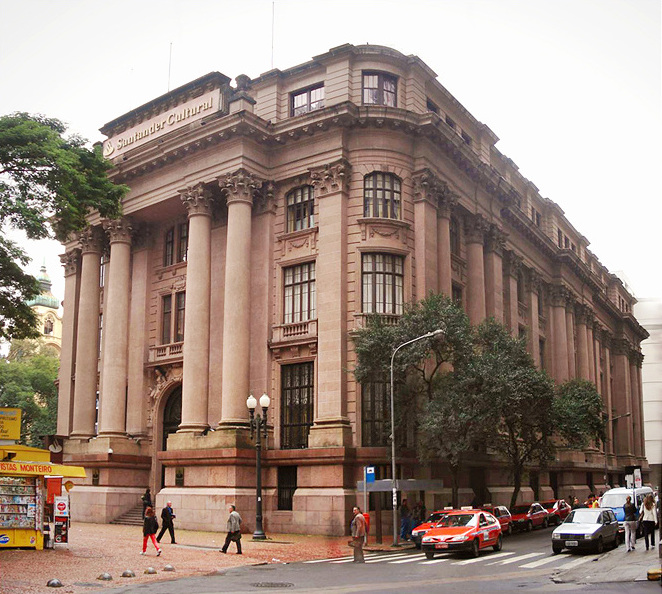
- Former headquarters of Banco da Província in Porto Alegre
- Company type: Financial services
- Founded: July 1, 1858; 167 years ago
- Founder: Lopo Gonçalves Bastos; João Batista Ferreira de Azevedo; José Antônio Coelho Júnior
- Defunct: 1972; 54 years ago
- Fate: Merge with Banco Industrial e Comercial do Sul and Banco Nacional do Comércio
- Headquarters: Porto Alegre, Rio Grande do Sul; Brazil

Banco da Província was the first commercial bank in the Brazilian state of Rio Grande do Sul. It was founded on July 1, 1858, by Lopo Gonçalves Bastos, João Batista Ferreira de Azevedo and José Antônio Coelho Júnior to facilitate their commercial transactions.

== History ==
Attempts to establish a bank began in 1854, but were delayed by bureaucratic obstacles. In 1858, the Banco da Província began its activities with four employees in a rented building on Praia Street, on the corner of Bragança Street. The first board consisted of Manuel Ferreira Porto (president), João Pereira Machado (secretary) and directors José Dias de Souza, José Joaquim dos Santos Ferreira, José Pedro Alves, José Inocêncio Pereira and Lopo Gonçalves. In 1859, a building was bought in Largo da Alfândega, where the bank operated until 1885, when the new headquarters, located on the corner of Sete de Setembro and General Câmara streets, was inaugurated.

The imperial decree that granted permission for the bank to operate also authorized the issue of paper money, which failed for different reasons, such as printing the notes in London, the high tax on the value of the issue and the costs of the inspector appointed by the government to work with the bank.

In the 1890s, Banco da Província launched an expansionist campaign, establishing branches in the interior of Rio Grande do Sul. In 1895, it bought the assets of the branches of Banco da República do Brasil in the state, whose liquidation was decreed in 1900. In 1909, it obtained authorization to implement the Caixa de Depósitos, which allowed it to receive deposits, grant popular loans and discount commercial bills, as well as extend its services to the interior of the Rio Grande do Sul.

In 1910, the Banco da Província began granting mortgages and long-term loans to the rural sector and financing public works, such as the São Pedro do Sul – São Borja Railroad, including a branch line linking Santiago do Boqueirão to São Luiz Gonzaga, public lighting and the first projects of the Companhia Carris Porto-Alegrense. In the same year, it established a consortium with the Dresdner Bank, the Bank für Handel und Industrie of Berlin and the construction company Bau und Betribskonsortium Backstein-Koppel to build the Taquari – Passo Fundo Railroad.

In 1914, the bank was affected by the economic crisis caused by World War I and had to reduce its activity, close some branches and liquidate its real credit department, which lent long-term and at low interest rates. In 1920, it had 33 branches and launched a brief growth period. However, the Revolution of 1923 interrupted the project, leading to an increase in defaults, which only changed in 1926 with a new period of expansion, halted by the crisis of 1929. In 1930, the state government appointed the company as its financial agent.

== Final years and merger ==
In 1967, Banco da Província incorporated Banco de Curitiba, Banco Magalhães Franco and Banco Prado Vasconcellos Júnior (the latter with headquarters and a branch in Rio de Janeiro and another branch in Aracaju) and increased its number to 52 agencies outside Rio Grande do Sul. In the same year, it incorporated Produsul and Intersul and became the first bank in the state to create a real estate credit portfolio.

In 1969, the bank faced intervention by the government of Rio Grande do Sul based on the allegation that some groups from outside the state were planning to assume control of the institution. Despite protest from its shareholders and board of directors, it was classified as a "public utility" through an act signed by Governor Walter Peracchi Barcelos. After several meetings, the shareholders committed not to sell their shares and the decree was revoked. However, the intervention caused a decrease in confidence in the bank, which led to losses in funding and the need for costly rediscount operations.

In 1970, the bank was taken over by a holding company linked to the Montepio da Família Militar and APLUB, which began to plan its merger with other institutions in the state, including Banmércio, already run by APLUB. During this period, five branches were closed, four in Paraná and one in Campina Grande, reducing the number of agencies to 99 and the workforce from 3,279 to 2,588. In 1972, Banco da Província merged with Banco Nacional do Comércio (Banmércio) and Banco Industrial e Comercial do Sul (Sulbanco) to form Banco Sul Brasileiro.

== Notable branches ==
The bank's branch in Cachoeira do Sul, inaugurated on September 8, 1927, was designed by Italian engineer and architect Domingos Rocco and declared a historical and cultural heritage site by the Municipal Historical and Cultural Heritage Council in 1985. In Passo Fundo, the agency founded in 1922 still retains its original features. In Pelotas, the agency was built in 1926 by the firm Azevedo Moura & Gertum, headed by engineer Fernando Azevedo Moura. The head office in Porto Alegre was built by the German architect Theodor Wiederspahn and is currently the headquarters of Santander Cultural.

== See also ==
- History of Porto Alegre
- Clube do Comércio
