= Farol Santander Porto Alegre =

Cultural center in Rio Grande do Sul

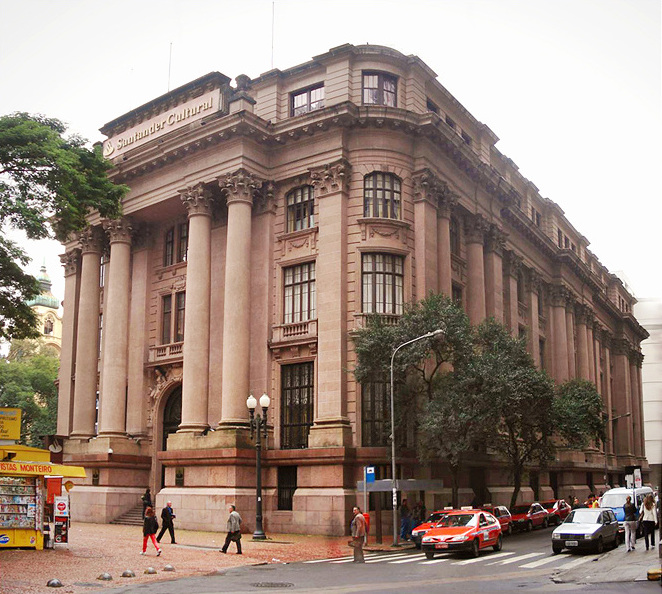
- Facade of the building

- Location within Rio Grande do Sul Location within Brazil
- Established: 2001
- Location: Porto Alegre, Rio Grande do Sul; Brazil
- Coordinates: 30°01′44.334″S 51°13′49.58″W
- Type: Cultural center
- Website: https://www.farolsantander.com.br/poa

Farol Santander Porto Alegre, formerly known as Santander Cultural, is a Brazilian cultural center run by Banco Santander. It is located in a historic building in Alfândega Square, in the Brazilian city of Porto Alegre, in Rio Grande do Sul. It has been listed as a heritage site by IPHAE.

== The building ==
Construction of the building began in 1927 and finished in 1931. Hipólito Fabre created the engineering project and Fernando Corona designed the facades and ornamentation and sculpted the frontispiece group. Theo Wiederspahn collaborated on the architectural project. The interior was designed by Stephan Sobczak, a Polish architect, and the sculptures on the rear facade were made by Alfredo Staege.

The building has an area of approximately 5,600 m^{2} and is listed as a landmark by the Instituto do Patrimônio Histórico e Artístico do Estado do Rio Grande do Sul (Institute of Historic and Artistic Heritage of Rio Grande do Sul - IPHAE).

It features eclectic architecture with neoclassical elements. Its rectangular floor plan is divided into five floors and a basement. The facades covered in cirex (a mixture of scraped dough and mica) stand on a granite base with refined sculptural and ornamental decoration. The interior has a large central hall illuminated by a skylight with French stained glass windows surrounded by columns and balustrades.

The building, which used to be the headquarters of the Província, Nacional do Comércio, Sul Brasileiro and Meridional banks, is currently managed by Santander. The restoration project kept the original spaces, ornamentation, stained glass and marble. The main intervention involved creating an atrium in the former stained glass lighting well. On the first and second floors, the space was organized to house exhibitions; in the basement, the old vaults were transformed into a cinema room, coffee shop and restaurants. The building has hosted exhibitions by painters Miró and Pablo Picasso and a retrospective by Vera Chaves Barcellos, and served as one of the venues for the MERCOSUR Biennial.

== Exhibitions ==
=== Queermuseu ===
Queermuseu — Cartografias da diferença na arte brasileira featured renowned artists such as Portinari, Lígia Clark and Adriana Varejão, and aimed to discuss and value diversity in the contemporary world. In September 2017, it was criticized by conservative and religious groups, who considered the content of some of the works to be inappropriate. The protests resulted in the early closure of the exhibition. In 2018, the Federal Public Prosecutor's Office in Rio Grande do Sul (MPF-RS) signed a Consensual Commitment Agreement with Santander Cultural for the organization of two exhibitions, within 18 months, with mandatory content on topics related to "difference and diversity". In the same year, the Etnos – Faces da Diversidade exhibition, featuring 160 masks from dozens of cultures, opened.

== See also ==
- Architecture of Porto Alegre
- History of Porto Alegre
- Banco da Província
- Clube do Comércio
