= Alfândega Square =

Public square in Porto Alegre, Brazil

Coordinates: 30°01′47″S 51°13′52″W

- Praça da Alfândega
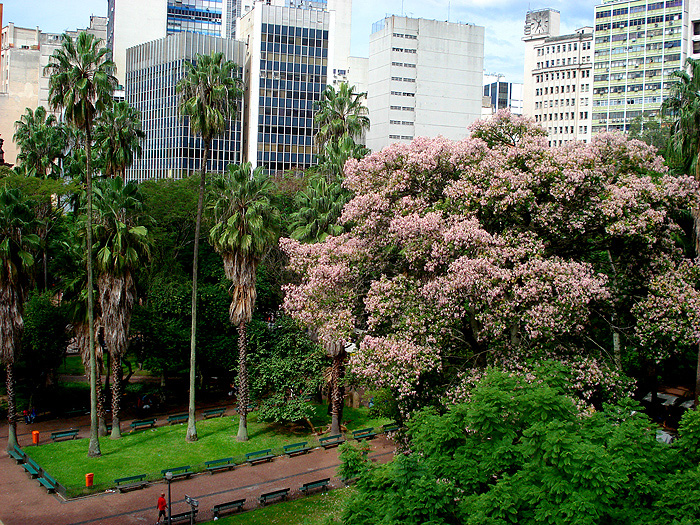
- Partial view of Alfândega Square in 2006.
- Type: Public
- Location: Porto Alegre, Rio Grande do Sul Brazil
- Administered by: Porto Alegre City Hall

Alfândega Square (Portuguese: Praça da Alfândega) is a public, historic, and tourist attraction in the Brazilian city of Porto Alegre, capital of the state of Rio Grande do Sul.

Located in the Historic Center of the city, the square is protected by the National Institute of Historic and Artistic Heritage (IPHAN) and the Institute of Historical and Artistic Heritage of the Rio Grande do Sul (IPHAE). It is surrounded by important buildings, some of them equally historic and old, such as the Ado Malagoli Museum of Art of Rio Grande do Sul (MARGS), the Memorial of Rio Grande do Sul, Santander Cultural, and the Commerce Club of Porto Alegre. Other buildings include the Banrisul and Caixa Econômica Federal headquarters and Rua da Praia Shopping Mall.

Traditionally, since 1855, the Porto Alegre Book Fair has been held at Alfândega Square, attracting thousands of visitors not only for the vast selection of books on offer, but also for the music, theater, and dance performances.

== History ==
=== Quitanda Square ===
The origins of the Alfândega Square date back to the end of the 18th century, when the area where it is located today served as the city's old river port. On July 2, 1783, the councilors of Porto Alegre ordered the construction of a stone pier by the Guaíba Lake to facilitate the arrival of passengers and goods.

In 1804, the then governor of the Captaincy of São Pedro do Rio Grande do Sul, Admiral Paulo Gama (future 1st Baron of Bagé), ordered the expansion of the anchorage with the construction of a pier, which was considered a remarkable work for its dimensions, with 24 pillars of stone entering the waterway, allowing the landing of sumacas (small two-masted boats) and large yachts. At that time, there was a square in front of the mentioned pier, next to the first Customs building of the city. Traders and greengrocers used to gather in this square, with their stalls arranged in a disorderly way, which is why the place was called Praça da Quintada (English: Quitanda Square) at the time.

In 1820, when it came to constructing a larger building for the Customs, the merchants were compelled to move to the then Paraíso Square, today known as XV de Novembro Square. The group resisted, and finally the west side of the square was allowed to be occupied for commerce. At the same time, Silvestre de Sousa Teles, based on a concession he had received, claimed ownership of part of the area that bordered the Customs building, which compromised the authorities' plans to expand the area. Silvestre de Sousa had his concession revoked, and the public administration ordered that the access to the pier and the Customs should be cleared of street vendors and temporary constructions. By this time, the name must have changed to Alfândega Square.

However, the efforts of the authorities were insufficient to keep the site free and clear, and the square suffered from the constant deposit of garbage. In response, the councilors ordered the city inspector that "with all urgency and above all, he must take care to remove the filth that was next to the Customs building, and that no more dumping continues to take place there, making sure that the place is always clean. The situation, however, only really improved when, between 1856 and 1858, a stone wall with stairs was erected by the river, on the alignment that today corresponds to Sete de Setembro Street.

=== Senador Florêncio Square ===
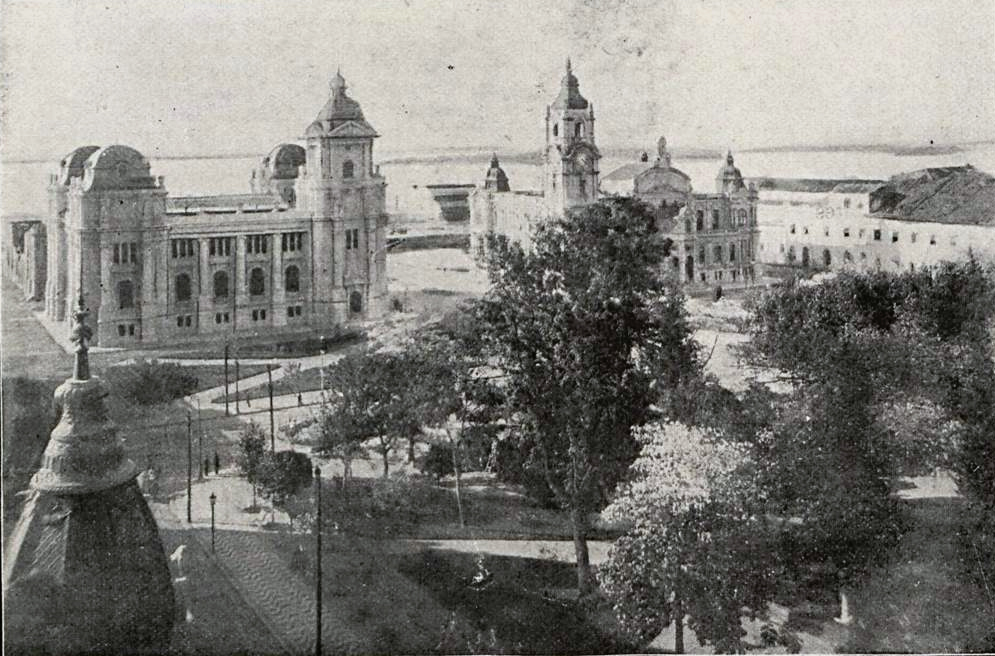
The square in 1919.

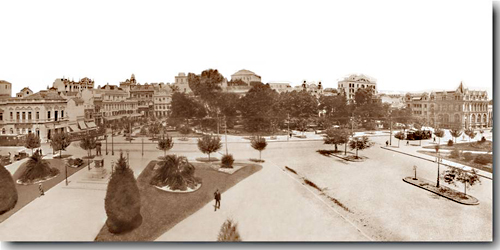
General view of the square in 1929.

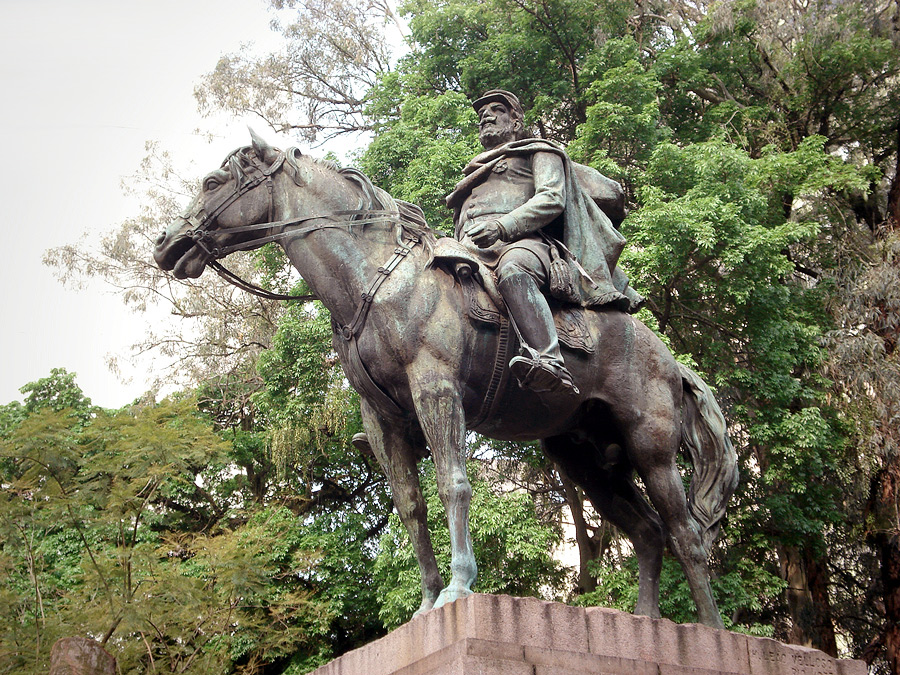
Monument to General Osório.

In 1866, the Companhia Hidráulica Porto-Alegrense began the tree planting of the Alfândega Square, initially with only nine trees. Later, the surrounding residents were allowed to adorn and garden the square, following the guidance of public engineering. The Companhia also installed one of the first fountains in the city, known as Chafariz da Imperatriz (English: Fountain of the Empress), which was inaugurated by D. Pedro II in October 1865; on top of this cast iron fountain from France, there were the figures of three chubby boys with their backs to each other. Like other fountains that were brought to Porto Alegre during the Belle Époque, the Chafariz da Imperatriz disappeared without a trace. A few years later, there were already seats on the sidewalk and a kiosk. On March 14, 1883, the name was changed to Senador Florêncio Square, in honor of Florêncio Carlos de Abreu e Silva.

In 1912, in order to meet the port improvement and sanitation policy of the city, the demolition of the old Customs building and a hundred-meter wide embankment into the Guaíba Lake consolidated the current configuration of the square and made possible the construction of the Tax Station (now MARGS) and Post and Telegraphs (now Memorial of Rio Grande do Sul) buildings, as well as the Mauá Pier, transformed into the main commercial warehouse between the interior of the state and abroad.

In addition, the small Barão do Rio Branco Square was incorporated into the new square that was being developed, with a French landscape design, in which a paved axis connected the square to the wharf gate through the Sepúlveda Avenue. California palms and broad-leaf privets were planted on this path. For the square's surroundings, jacaranda was used; nevertheless, much of the existing vegetation was preserved, which explains the presence of pines, cypresses, and eucalyptus in the photographs of the time.

In 1920, a series of floss silk trees that were harming the growth of neighboring trees and the local landscaping were removed. In 1923, the Monument to General Osório was installed in the center of the area, with an equestrian statue, water mirrors, benches and fountains, made by sculptor Hildegardo Leão Veloso. In 1935, the statue The Samaritan was moved from the Montevideo Square, where it was replaced by the Talavera de La Reina Fountain.

The presence of streetcars, first pulled by donkeys, then powered by electricity, was responsible for the great circulation of pedestrians in the Alfândega Square, attracted by its proximity to cafés, restaurants, movie theaters, clubs and hotels. Among these well-known spots were the Grande Hotel (destroyed in a fire in 1967), the Commerce Club, the Cine Guarany and the Central Cinema.

=== Alfândega Square ===
In 1979, the Porto Alegre City Council approved a law that unified the squares Senador Florêncio and Barão do Rio Branco, absorbing the stretch of Sete de Setembro Street and turning it into a pedestrian walkway. In addition, the whole area between the Andradas Street, Capitão Montanha Street, Siqueira Campos Street, and Cassiano do Nascimento Street was absorbed. A western portion, however, was lost by the square to make way for the construction of a new headquarters for the Caixa Econômica Federal. At this point, the name reverted to the former Alfândega Square.

In 2007, archaeological prospection work was carried out in order to discover the exact location of the old stone anchorage and other remnants of the square's former configuration.

The square was included in the Monumenta Program, being renovated to restore the characteristics it had at the beginning of the 20th century.

== Monuments and sculptures ==
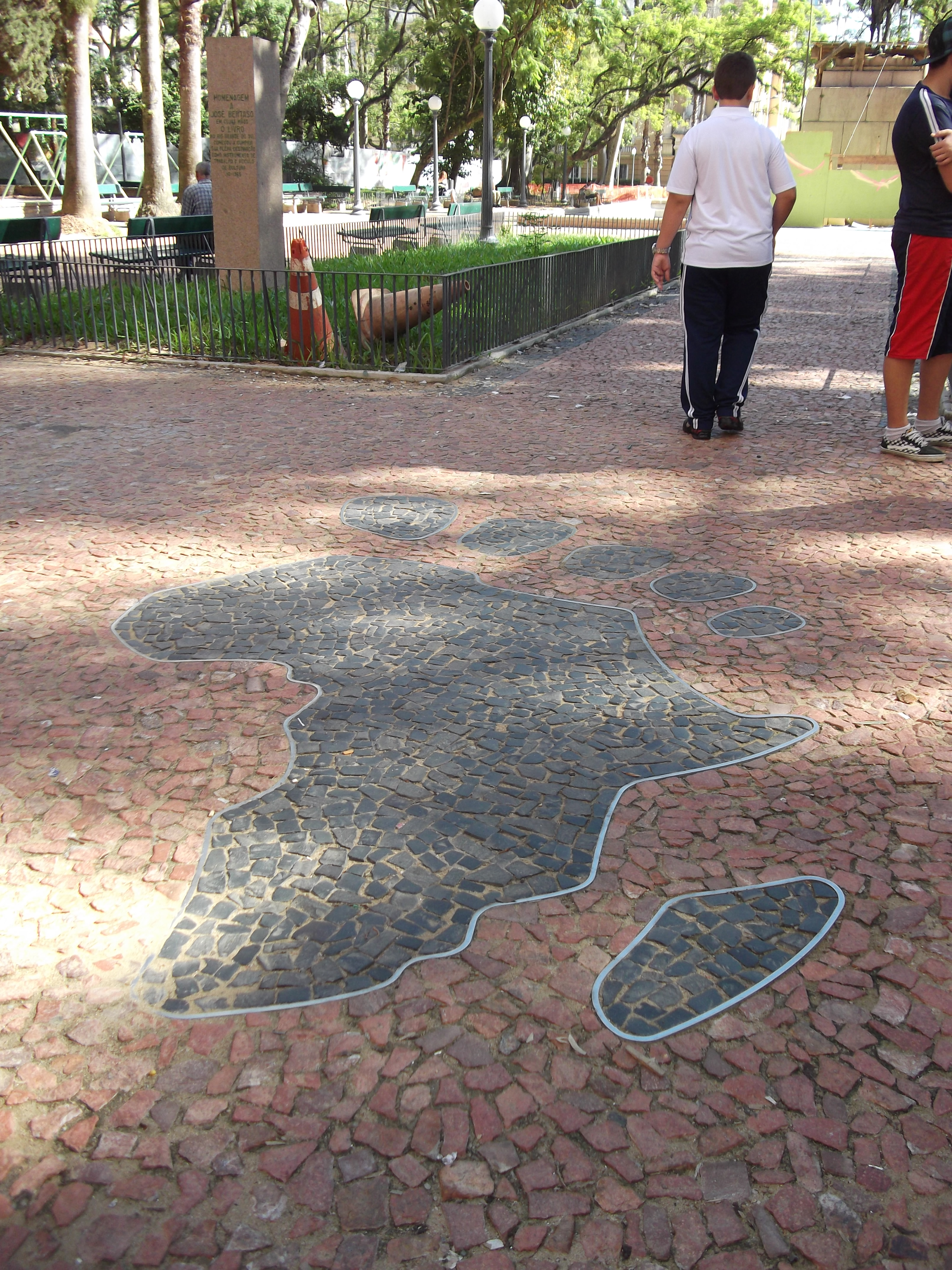
The African Footprint, one of the landmarks of the Museum of the Black History in Porto Alegre.

The Alfândega Square has several monuments and sculptures in its corners, among which the most important are the Monument to the Baron of Rio Branco, the Monument to General Osório, the hermas dedicated to Antônio Carlos Lopes, to Caldas Júnior, to Leonardo Truda, and to the Baron of Santo Ângelo, and the group of sculptures of Mário Quintana and Carlos Drummond de Andrade by Francisco Stockinger.

In 2011, on the sidewalk of the square that corresponds to Andradas Street, the African Footprint was inaugurated, part of the Museum of the Black History in Porto Alegre, representing the journey of black culture in the city.

In 2014, the monument honoring Júlio La Porta, the so-called "sheriff" of the Porto Alegre Book Fair, was inaugurated. The bell-shaped sculpture, an object used by Júlio to open and close the Fair, is also honored by the monument. Some of the square monuments have been vandalized, having bronze parts stolen or being repeatedly graffitied. The project of recovery and restoration of the monuments has hidden the plaques where the information about the busts is located.

== Book fair ==
Since 1955, always in the second fortnight of October, the traditional Porto Alegre Book Fair has been held in the square, organized by the Rio-Grandense Book Chamber. The fair attracts thousands of visitors who seek the new national and international releases or the many offers of used books at low cost. They can also attend the music, dance and theater shows that take place daily, and enjoy the spectacle of the floss silk trees, pink trumpet trees and jacaranda trees in full bloom at this time of year.

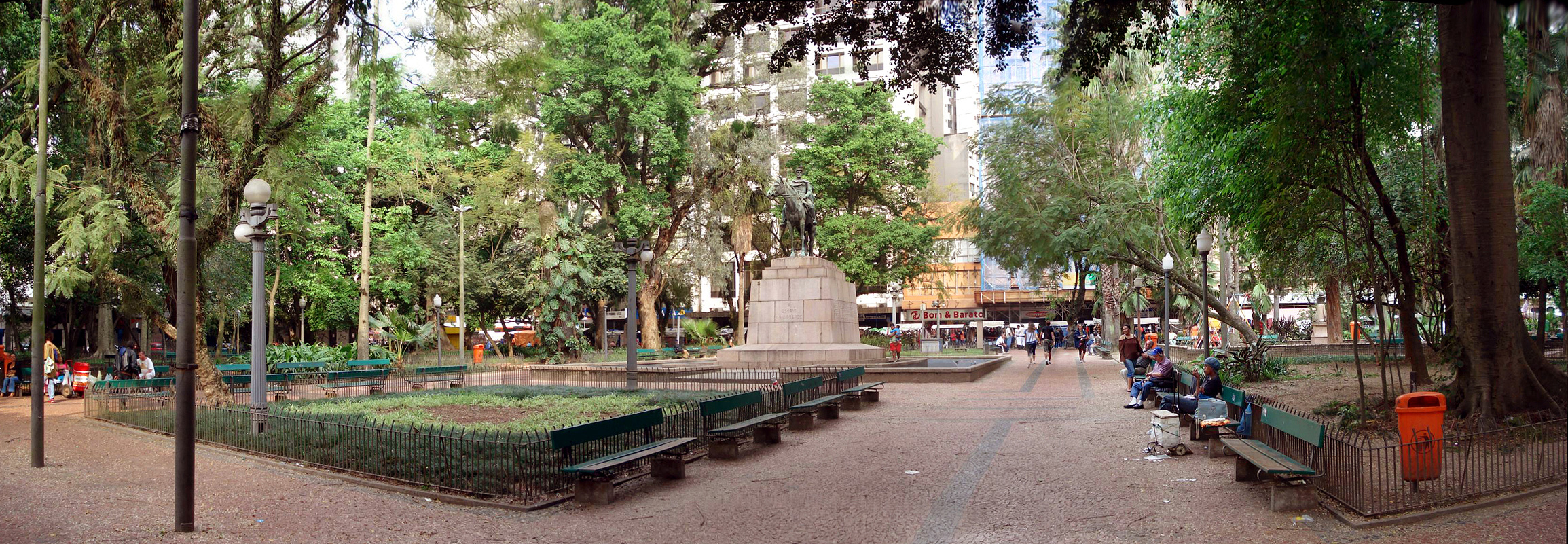
Partial view of Alfândega Square, in Porto Alegre, Brazil. Southern part, with the monument to General Osório.

== See also ==
- History of Porto Alegre
- Architecture of Porto Alegre
