= Rio Grande do Sul Memorial =

Brazilian cultural center

- Memorial do Rio Grande do Sul
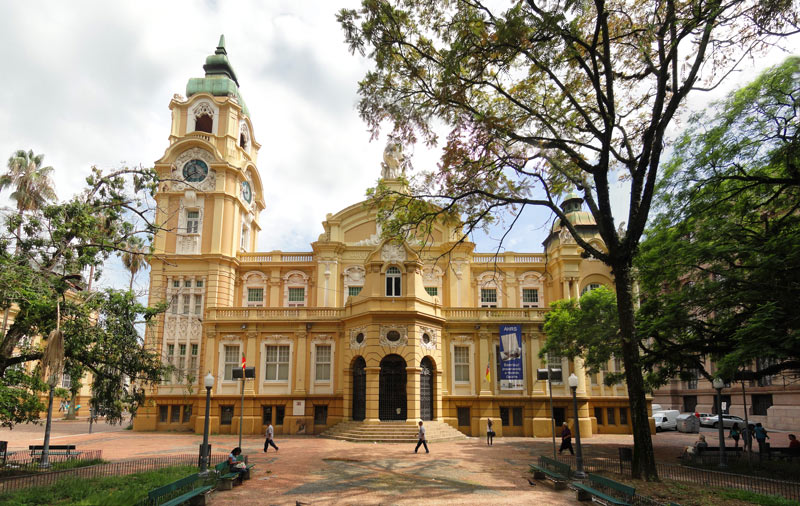
- Main facade of the Memorial in front of Alfândega Square.

- Location within Brazil
- Former names: Old Correios e Telégrafos Building; Old Correios Building

General information
- Architectural style: Eclecticism
- Location: 1020 Sete de Setembro Street, Historic Center; Porto Alegre, Rio Grande do Sul, Brazil
- Coordinates: 30°01′45″S 51°13′49″W
- Construction started: September 30, 1910
- Construction stopped: December 31, 1913

Design and construction
- Architect: Theo Wiederspahn

Website
- https://cultura.rs.gov.br/memorial-rs

The Rio Grande do Sul Memorial (English: Memorial do Rio Grande do Sul) is a cultural center in Porto Alegre, housed in a historic property located in Alfândega Square, in the city's historic center. It is a building listed as historical heritage by the City Hall and by the National Institute of Historic and Artistic Heritage.

== The institution ==
The Memorial was created as the result of a project that sought to preserve the culture and memory of Rio Grande do Sul. The idea materialized in September 1996, through an agreement between the federal and state governments. The deal to transfer the building, formerly the central agency of the Correios e Telégrafos of Porto Alegre, also included the creation of a Postal Museum and a Philatelic Agency, in order to protect its original functions.

A large information and dissemination center for the state's history was organized, providing the public with a rich collection of objects, maps, engravings, photos, books and important testimonies about the most important events in Rio Grande do Sul. In order to display this material, a modern museography was designed to facilitate its integration with the public and its easy assimilation.

=== Spaces ===
- Linha do Tempo (English: Timeline): a permanent exhibition set up in the building's lobby that shows the main events that formed the history and identity of the people of Rio Grande do Sul. It is an interactive exposition with 52 modules and 36 thematic panels with texts, illustrations and maps;
- Colunas Personagens (English: Columns Characters): an adaptation of the large columns located in the lobby to display reproductions of documents, photographs, drawings and biographies that historically contextualize the lives of important people in the state's memory;
- Salas do Tesouro (English: Treasury Rooms): adapted with air conditioning and other special equipment, they present temporary exhibitions of rare documents and manuscripts from the collection of more than 12,000 items held by the Historical Archives of Rio Grande do Sul;
- Sala de Múltiplos Usos (English: Multi-use room): designed to serve as a center for events of all kinds. It covers 150 m^{2} and has already been occupied by an exhibition on Getúlio Vargas, part of the Mercosur Biennial and the Porto Alegre Book Fair;
- Salas de Vídeo (English: Video rooms): located in the four corners of the second floor, they offer thematic activities on the environment, immigration, wars and revolutions, culture and tradition, complementing and contextualizing the information presented in the Timeline;
- Auditório Oswaldo Goidanich (English: Oswaldo Goidanich Auditorium): designed for different events such as seminars, lectures, conferences, symposia, book launches, films and workshops;
- Sala Verde dos Correios (English: Post Office Green Room): managed by a partnership between the Correios and the Ministry of the Environment and Climate Change, it presents research material, publications and the activities of other institutions focused on environmental preservation and awareness;
- Museu Postal (English: Postal Museum): a place where relics such as old post boxes, desk objects and furniture used in the old Correios e Telégrafos office are preserved.

=== Projects ===
With the support of the National Association for the Dissemination of the Political History and Culture of Rio Grande do Sul, the Rio Grande do Sul State Department of Culture and Banrisul, the Memorial organizes, in addition to its permanent exhibitions, several projects designed to bring the institution closer to all those interested in the culture of Rio Grande do Sul. The main ones are:

- Guided tours: facilitate the public's contact with the material on display;
- Cadernos de história do memorial (English: Memorial's history notebooks): a collection written by Professor Voltaire Schilling in partnership with several intellectuals, addressing local and global issues. More than 30 titles have already been released, with a print run of more than 50,000 volumes, distributed free of charge at the headquarters or available to download from the Memorial's website;
- Seminars and debates: hosts monthly meetings on subjects relating to Afro-Brazilian and Afro-Gaucha history;
- Vídeo Memória (English: Video Memory): daily screenings of films about local culture;
- Memorial Vai às Praias (English: Memorial Goes to the Beaches): organizes exhibitions in cities along the coast of Rio Grande do Sul in partnership with city halls or private institutions;
- Mobile exhibitions: organized through partnerships with city halls or institutions from all over Brazil interested in learning more about the state's history;

== The building's history ==
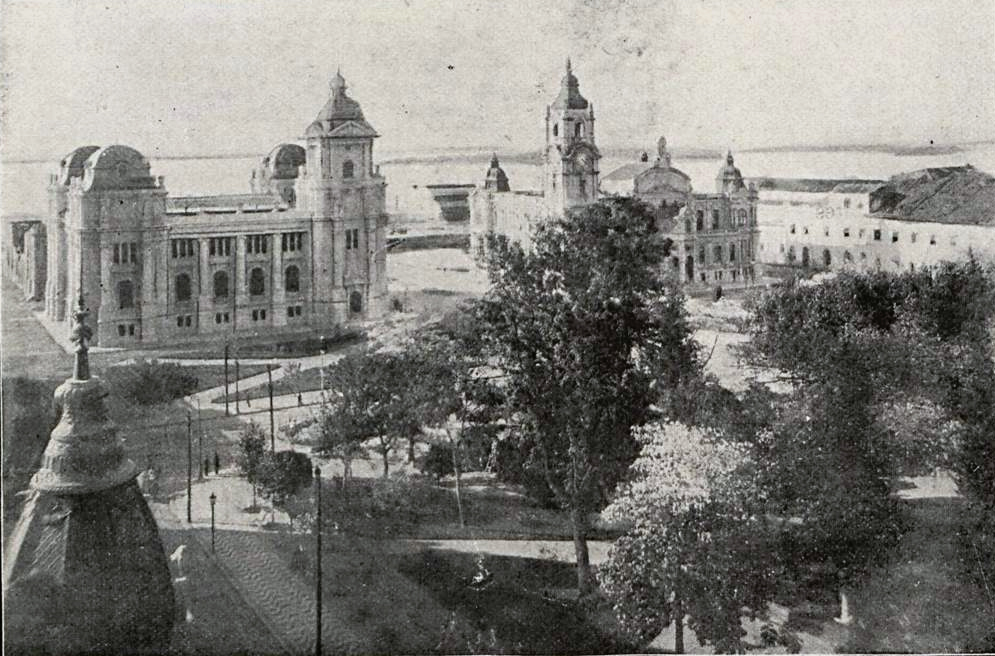
Alfândega Square in 1919, with the Correios on the right.

The old Correios e Telégrafos building, or old Correios Building, is one of the most beautiful and important historic properties in Porto Alegre. Construction began on September 30, 1910, and was completed on December 31, 1913, with Rudolph Ahrons as engineer and Theodor Wiederspahn as architect. The decoration was carried out by João Vicente Friedrichs' workshop, with the participation of Jesús Maria Corona, Franz Radermacher, Wenzel Folberger and Victorio Livi. Ahrons' company was chosen for its recognized competence, but also as a way of bringing the Positivist government closer to the state's German community.

The building adopts an eclectic style with a strong German Baroque influence, and has a dynamic facade with a prominent portico, a large clock tower on the left and metal domes at the corners. It also features profuse ornamentation in floral and abstract patterns, and some sculptures, including the Atlas group above the pediment, flanked by images representing Europe and America. Other groups complement the ornamentation on the facade.

Listed as historical heritage in 1980, the complex, which covers an area of 3,600m², underwent a complete restoration process in 1998 with the goal of restoring its original features and making it suitable for the installation of the Rio Grande do Sul Memorial. The 3,500m² of facades received special treatment; internally, the areas destined for the Historical Archives of Rio Grande do Sul and the Treasury Rooms were equipped with air conditioning. The internal courtyards received skylights and elevators to allow for greater integration with the other areas, and the terrace was freed from later unnecessary additions.

== Gallery ==
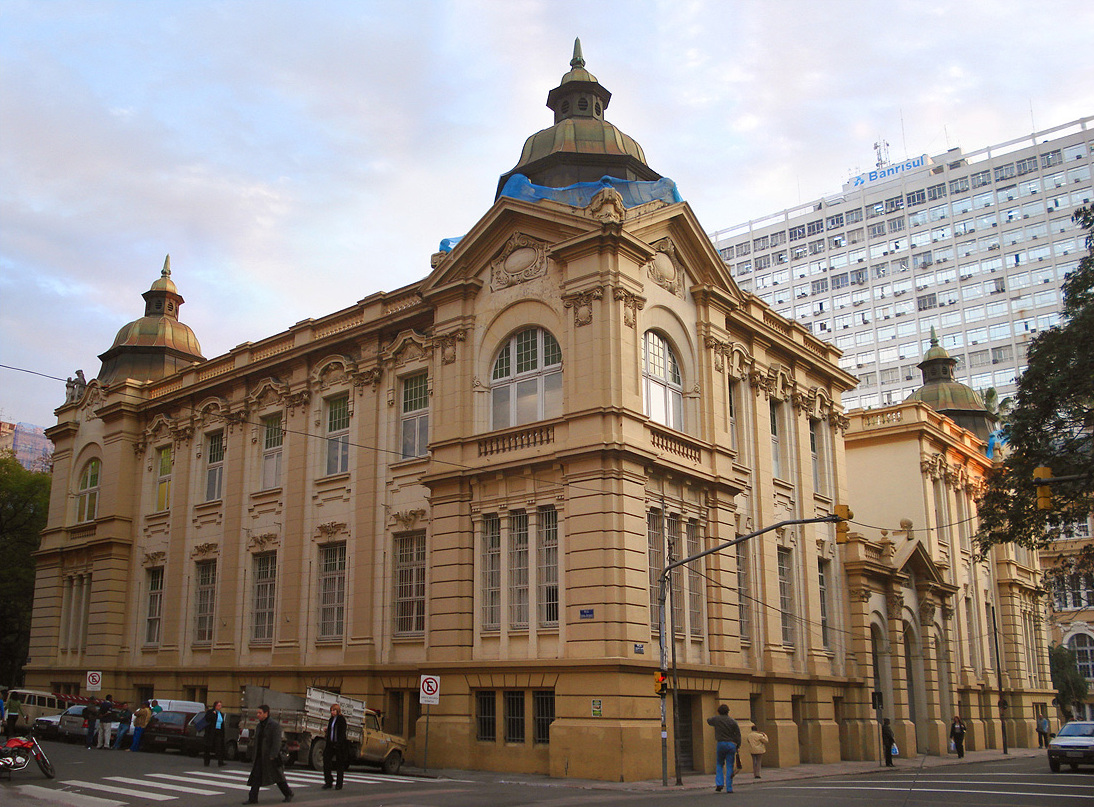
Back facade of the Memorial.

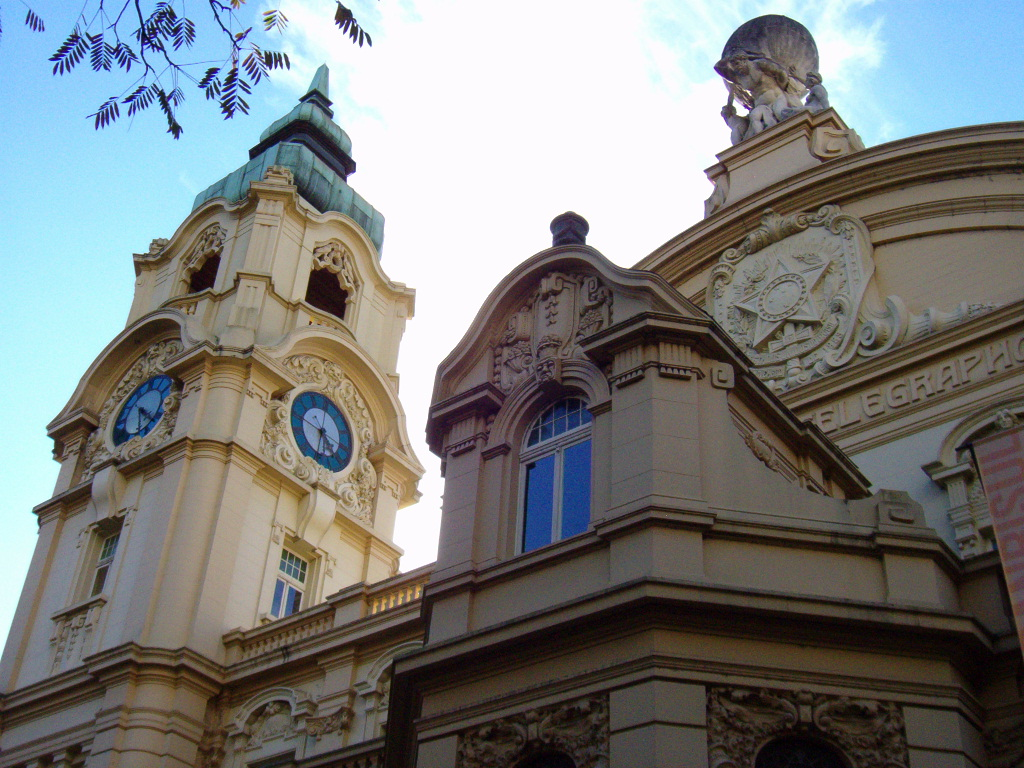
Another angle of the facade, with the clock tower in the background.

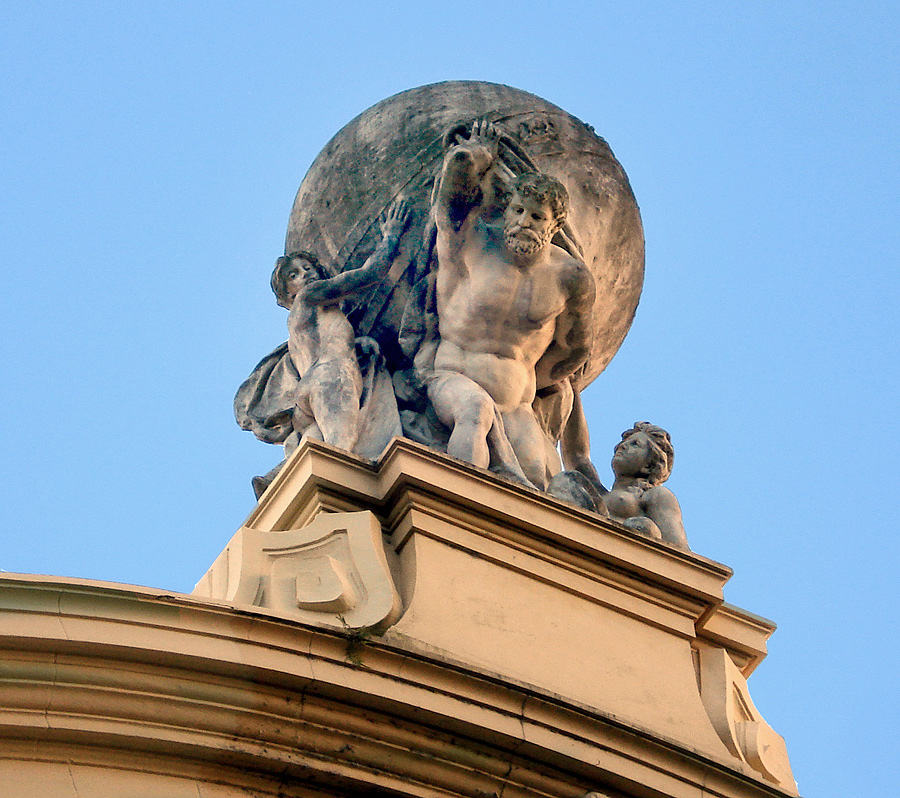
Atlas statue by Wenzel Folberger.

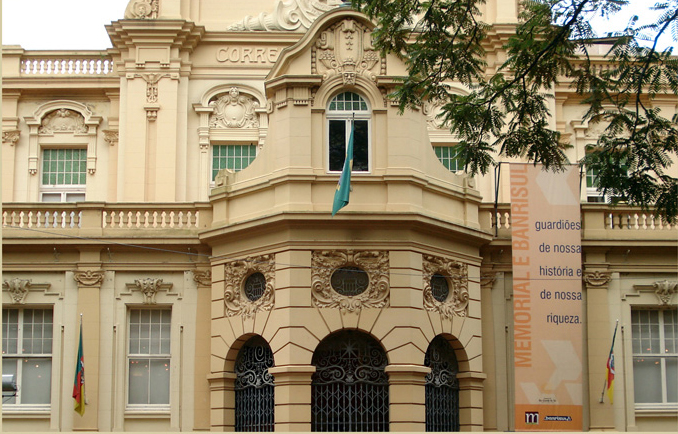
Detail of the facade.

== See also ==
- History of Porto Alegre
- History of Rio Grande do Sul
- Architecture of Porto Alegre
- Historic Center of Porto Alegre
