= Queermuseu =

Art exhibition

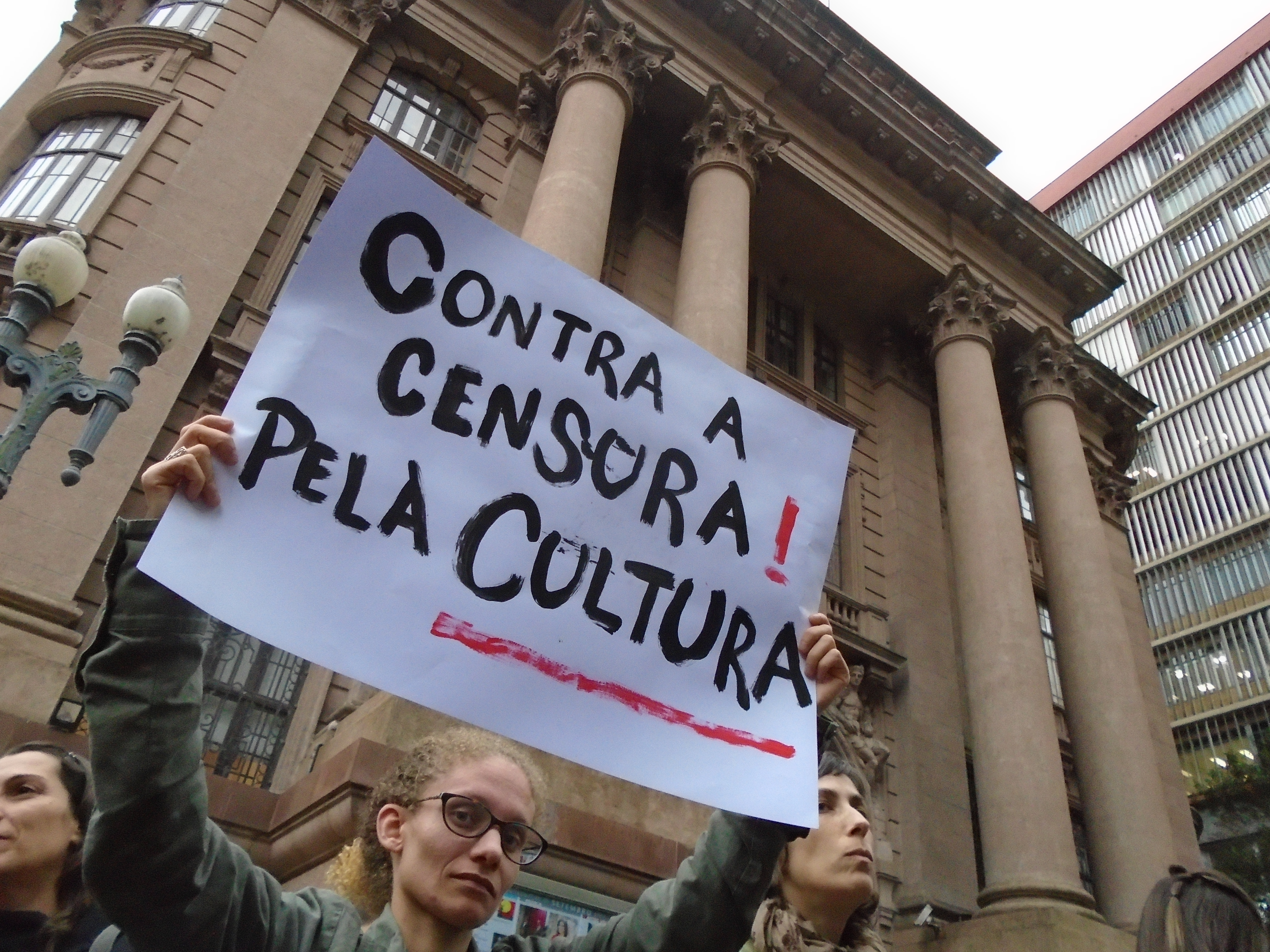
A protester demonstrates against the closure of the exhibition in front of the Santander Cultural building.

Queermuseu — Cartografias da diferença na arte brasileira (lit. 'Queer Museum — Cartographies of Difference in Brazilian Art') was a Brazilian art exhibition presented at the Farol Santander Porto Alegre center. The exhibition generated controversy due to accusations of promoting pedophilia, zoophilia, and blasphemy. Propagated on social media, mainly by the Free Brazil Movement, these accusations were part of a moral panic surrounding early childhood education. Santander responded to criticism and pressure from religious and conservative groups by canceling the exhibition. This decision generated further criticism, based on claims of defending freedom of expression and artistic creation. After a crowdfunding campaign, the exhibition was reopened in 2018 at Parque Lage in Rio de Janeiro. The curator of Queermuseu, Gaudêncio Fidelis, reported that the reopening was visited by more than ten thousand people. He emphasized that he received numerous death threats because of the exhibition.

Following this incident, other exhibitors began including age ratings for their exhibitions, as was the case with the Farnese de Andrade exhibition in Curitiba, which took place in the same context as Queermuseu.

== Context ==
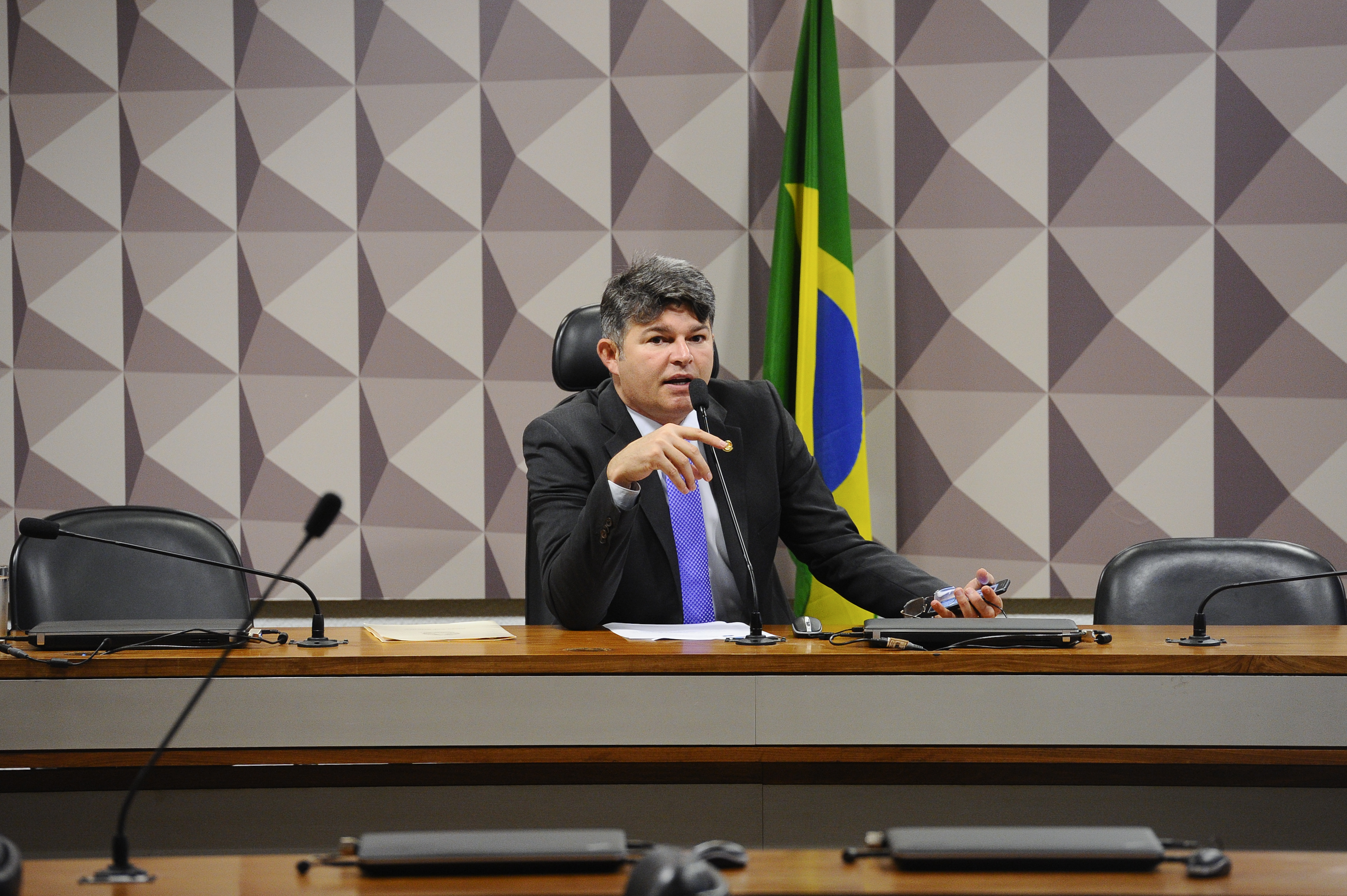
Interactive hearing to hear testimonies regarding the Queermuseu exhibition is postponed. At the table, rapporteur of the Parliamentary Commission, Senator José Medeiros (Pode-MT).

The exhibition generated debate on social media. Christian groups, especially Catholics, along with the Free Brazil Movement and deputy Marcel van Hattem, claimed that there were images that disrespected Catholic religious symbols, and images associated with pornography, pedophilia, and zoophilia. According to these groups, images of communion wafers with inscriptions of the names of sexual organs were displayed, as well as images of people penetrating and masturbating animals. Furthermore, according to these allegations, an image of the Sacred Heart of Jesus was associated with homosexuality. According to critics of the event, the accusations of pedophilia were based on images of children portrayed in a "cross-dressing and sexualized" manner. Another argument used by the accusers of the exhibition was the lack of age ratings, which allowed minors access to the exhibition. The use of public funds in the exhibition promoted by a private bank was also criticized. As a result, there were many opposing demonstrations from these groups on the official Queermuseu social media pages. These demonstrations called for the closure of the exhibition and even the termination of accounts for customers of Santander, the bank that promoted the event. Bank branches were even vandalized by critics of the exhibition.

The Archdiocese of Porto Alegre released a statement expressing "its surprise at the promotion of the exhibition held at the Santander Cultural center in the capital of Rio Grande do Sul, which disrespectfully uses symbols, elements, and images, caricaturing the Catholic faith and the concept of morality that elevates the human body and sexuality as a gift from God." The statement emphasized that there have been "discriminatory attacks on the Judeo-Christian culture that contributed to the cultural formation of the West" and affirmed that "eliminating difficulties can never mean disrespecting others and their beliefs."

In light of these events, Santander decided to close the exhibition on September 10. The bank released a statement apologizing and stating that "we have heard the demonstrations and understand that some of the works in the Queermuseu exhibition disrespected symbols, beliefs and people, which is not in line with our worldview." The exhibition's curator, Gaudêncio Fidélis, said that he was not informed before the announcement of the early closure of the exhibition and that he learned about the matter through Facebook. LGBTQ NGOs stated their intention to hold a protest in front of Santander Cultural, in addition to issuing a statement of repudiation of the cancellation of the exhibition.

To explain the accusations against Queermuseu, Gaudêncio Fidelis was forcibly summoned to testify before the Federal Senate by Senator Magno Malta (PR-ES), president of the Parliamentary Commission of Inquiry into Child Abuse. In his testimony, Fidelis dismissed any connection between the CPI and the exhibition and stated that the accusations of pedophilia, zoophilia, and blasphemy were defamatory because they selected only five of the 263 works that comprised the exhibition. Gaudêncio emphasized that the accusations removed the works from their artistic contexts and distorted their original meanings. The rapporteur of the CPI, Senator José Medeiros (Pode-MT), presented one of the works used in the accusations against the exhibition, asking if it was part of Queermuseu. Gaudêncio confirmed that it was not part of Queermuseu and highlighted that this and numerous other artistic works that did not participate in the exhibition were used to defame Queermuseu. He explained that the distortion of the concept of Lygia Clark's work, The I and the You, began during an interview in Porto Alegre, when accusations of pedophilia were made by a coordinator of the MBL and caused deep embarrassment to the artist's son.

== Works ==
One of the works in the exhibition, Cena do Interior II, by artist Adriana Varejão, was accused of promoting zoophilia by depicting two male figures with a goat. Adriana states:

This is an adult work made for adults. The painting is a compilation of existing sexual practices, some historical (such as shunga, classic erotic images of Japanese folk art) and others based on literary narratives or collected during travels through Brazil. The work does not aim to judge these practices. As an artist, I only seek to shed light on things that often exist hidden. It is an aspect of my work, adult reflection.

== Legacy ==
Following the controversy surrounding the cancellation of the exhibition, Santander Cultural, in agreement with the Public Prosecutor's Office, paid a fine of R$420,000. Half of this amount was allocated to the "Eu Sou Cultura" grant program, focused on projects related to human rights. Among these, the Associação Chico Lisboa launched the "Mostra Fora da Margem: Panorama Subjetividades Queer" in 2021, an exhibition featuring LGBTQ artists in response to the closure of the Queermuseu.

The fine money was also used to fund the Porto Alegre Pride Parade for the following three years.
