= Minor Basilica of Our Lady of Sorrows =

Catholic temple in Brazil

- Basílica Menor de Nossa Senhora das Dores
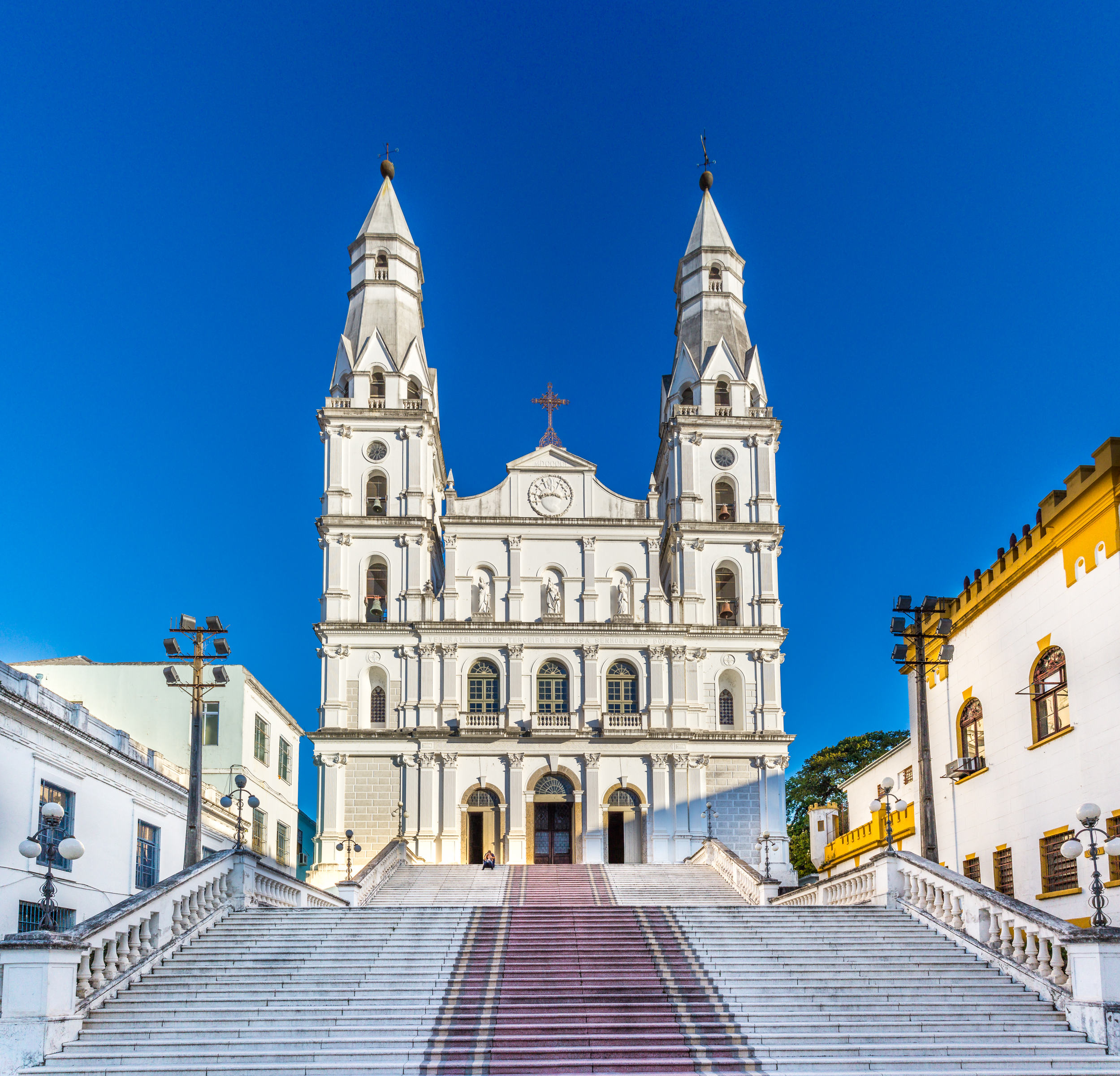
- Front view of the Basilica Minor
- Minor Basilica of Our Lady of Sorrows
- 30°01′57″S 51°14′08″W
- Location: Porto Alegre, Rio Grande do Sul; Brazil

Architecture
- Completed: 1807; 219 years ago

Administration
- Archdiocese: Archdiocese of Porto Alegre

Clergy
- Archbishop: Dom Jaime Spengler
- Priest: Lucas Matheus Mendes

The Minor Basilica of Our Lady of Sorrows (Portuguese: Basílica Menor de Nossa Senhora das Dores) is the oldest standing Catholic temple in the Brazilian city of Porto Alegre, in the state of Rio Grande do Sul. Its construction lasted a considerable time and the design of the facade, which was modified even before it was inaugurated, today features an eclectic style. However, the interior is richly decorated with gilded woodwork in a late Baroque style with neoclassical elements and has an important group of life-size Baroque statues of Christ representing the cycle of the Passion.

The seat of ancient religious traditions and of great historical and artistic significance, it has been classified as a national heritage site by IPHAN. In 2022, the church was given the title of Minor Basilica by Pope Francis.

== History ==
Celebrations of the Virgin Mary's sorrows date back to the 15th century, but a liturgy with a defined iconography was only established in 1667. The Seven Sorrows of Mary - the prophecy of Simeon, the flight into Egypt, the loss of Jesus in the Temple at the age of twelve, the Calvary, the Crucifixion, the Deposition and Burial of Jesus - became symbolically represented by seven swords, or sometimes just one, pierced through the Virgin's heart. In 1761, this devotion was introduced in Portugal by the Oratorian priests of Braga. In Brazil, attempts to establish the tradition began in the middle of the 18th century.

In Porto Alegre, the worship was already documented in 1799, when a Devotion was created to celebrate Mass every Friday in honor of its Patroness, enthroned on a side altar of the Old Church of Our Lady Mother of God. Its members were part of the town's elite, including councillors, royal officials, military personnel and important merchants. This devotion was the origin of the Brotherhood of Our Lady of Sorrows, organized in 1801, with Father Thomé Luiz de Souza, then curate of the parish church, on the board of directors. An assembly held on May 1, 1806, determined the construction of a church, whose foundation stone was laid in 1807. On March 13, 1809, a Royal License authorized the construction. Apparently by this time the consistory had already been erected and the chancel was being built, but the walls of the chancel collapsed in 1810.

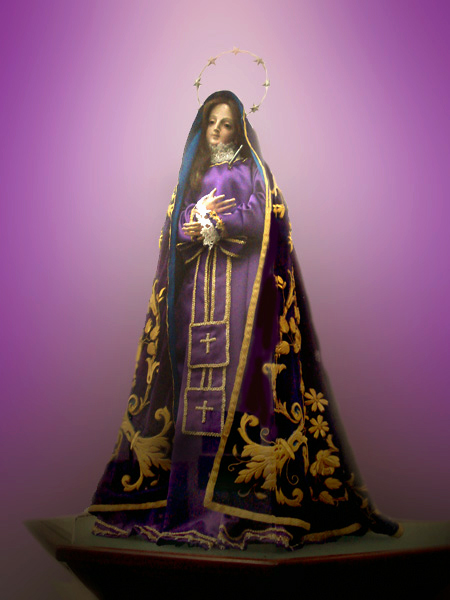
Image of Our Lady of Sorrows in the Basilica's collection.

On January 16, 1812, the Brotherhood was authorized to move its image into the chancel, now rebuilt, and begin celebrating Masses. On February 20, 1813, the celebrations were confirmed by Episcopal Provision and the chapel was actually transferred and consecrated on June 25, 1813. On March 16, 1814, the first solemn service of Our Lady of Sorrows was held with great pomp and lavish decoration. On November 22, 1817, the Brotherhood's Commitment was approved by the king, which established the male positions of prior, vice-prior, secretary, treasurer, procurator, vicar of the cult of the Divine, chief sacristan, janitors, brothers of the Table, judge, protectors, walker, and the female positions of prioress, director, aunts of the Blessed Virgin, stewards and judge.

On February 11, 1819, by Apostolic Indult, the Brotherhood was elevated to the rank of Third Order, subordinate to the Servite Priests. In 1822, Father Thomé was appointed Commissary General of the Order, responsible for its spiritual direction. The Order was only confirmed on September 18, 1824, but a series of requirements were introduced for the admission of new members, which created internal conflict, emptied the Order and threatened it with extinction. The new rules partially dissolved its character as a Third Order, and from that time on, the sodalitium took on the name of Confraternity.

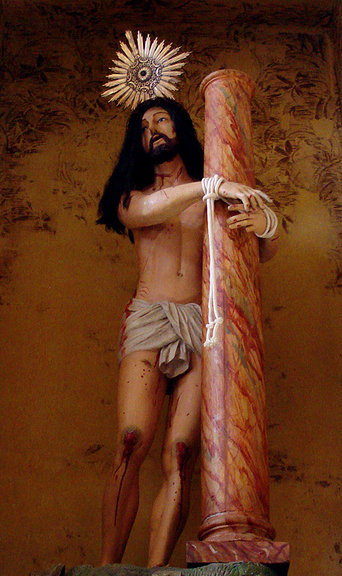
Christ tied to the column on a side altar.

Between 1839 and 1840, the prior repealed some impediments, brought back former dissidents and increased contributions. On October 24, 1832, an autonomous parish had been created for the church, dismembered from the Mother Church, but the installation was postponed and the work on the building was paralyzed during the Ragamuffin Revolution. The Confraria opposed the creation of the parish and claimed it couldn't afford a permanent priest. Emperor Pedro II appointed Father José Soares do Patrocínio Mendonça to the position, who assumed it on October 22, 1859.

Until 1846, the building was still basically limited to the chancel, with a makeshift shed used as the nave, when Luís Alves de Lima e Silva, the Count of Caxias, donated four contos de réis to start laying the foundations for the side walls. In the following years, other donations came from the Provincial Treasury and lotteries, but until 1856 the work progressed very little, when it was resumed with more enthusiasm. With the walls erected in mid-1857, João do Couto e Silva installed the roof and finished the facade (still without cladding) and the vault. As the initial project had been altered, a commission supervised by Luiz Vieira Ferreira was formed in 1863 to carry out the necessary corrections, completed in 1866. The church was consecrated on May 10, 1868, by Dom Sebastião Dias Laranjeira. The interior carving was also done by João do Couto e Silva and the ceiling painting and gilding by Germano Traub. The monumental staircase at the front was only finished in 1873, since access was previously via Riachuelo Street, behind the church.

Until the end of the 19th century, the building had no external cladding or towers, but the community joined forces to complete the necessary improvements. The original colonial baroque design, already disfigured, was abandoned for good and a new one was commissioned from the architect Júlio Weise, who designed an eclectic facade. The western tower was inaugurated in 1900, and the other the following year. Construction wasn't finished until 1904. According to the story, the delay in completion was the result of the curse of a slave who was unjustly condemned to hang for stealing a necklace from the statue of Our Lady. However, historian Sérgio da Costa Franco claims that the accusation is false, and that the sentence passed on the slave was due to a murder.

At the beginning of the century, several devotional statues were acquired. In 1927, the interior was renovated and painted by the company of Fernando Schlatter, and the woodwork was restored by the artist Guilherme Callegari. In 1938, the church was declared a national historic and artistic heritage site. In 1951, the floor was replaced and the ceiling renovated. In 1954, the surface of the nave was covered in yellow bricks and the floors and ceilings of the side chapels were reinforced. In 1961, 56 new pews were added due to the increase in worshippers.

From 1951 until the end of the 1970s, the church was under the care of the Fathers of the Congregation of the Blessed Sacrament, who were invited by the then Archbishop of Porto Alegre, Dom Alfredo Vicente Scherer, to start the Work of Perpetual Adoration in Porto Alegre, with the temple as its shrine.

=== Restoration and elevation to Minor Basilica ===
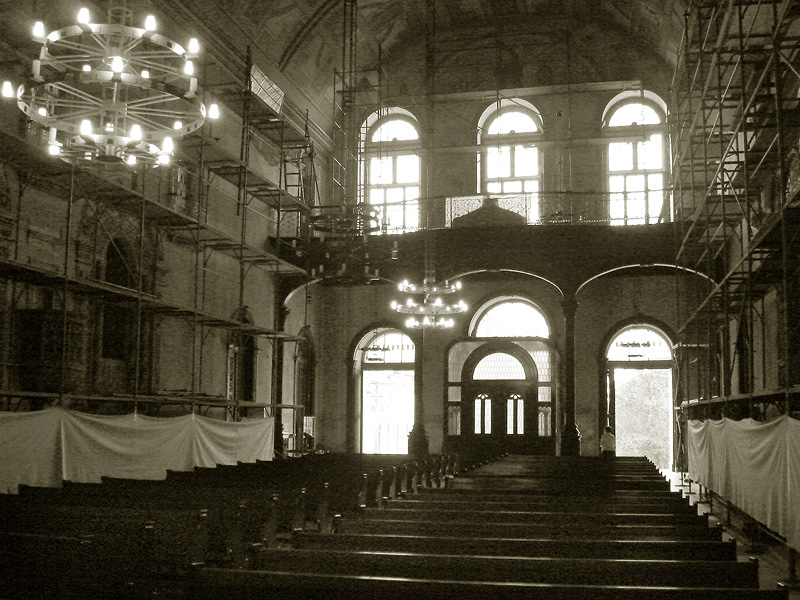
Nave under restoration.

After its completion, the building suffered serious deterioration over the years, leading to emergency restoration work being conducted in 1980 on the roof and ceiling, in 1996 on the chancel and in 1998 on the staircase. From 2001 onwards, new projects began to remodel the parking lot and enlarge the assembly hall, with resources from the community and from the state and federal Cultural Incentive Laws. The project extended into 2003 to restore the interior's integrated assets, such as the altars, ceilings, decorative paintings, choir and other pieces.

The restoration of the exterior began in 2008 and was included in the Monumenta Program, with the participation of the IDB, UNESCO and the World Bank. Archaeological prospecting of the basement and its surroundings was also planned, in partnership with the Urban Archaeology Project developed by the Joaquim Felizardo Museum. The work ended in 2017 with the completion of the chancel. Ancient parietal paintings were discovered during the restoration.

In 2022 the church was given the title of Minor Basilica in the Vatican by Pope Francis, becoming the first in Porto Alegre and the third in the state to receive this title.

== The building ==
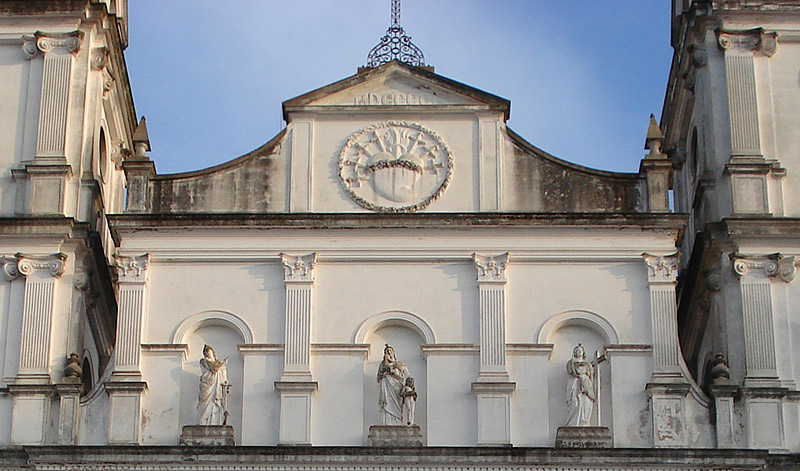
Detail of the facade with the statues.

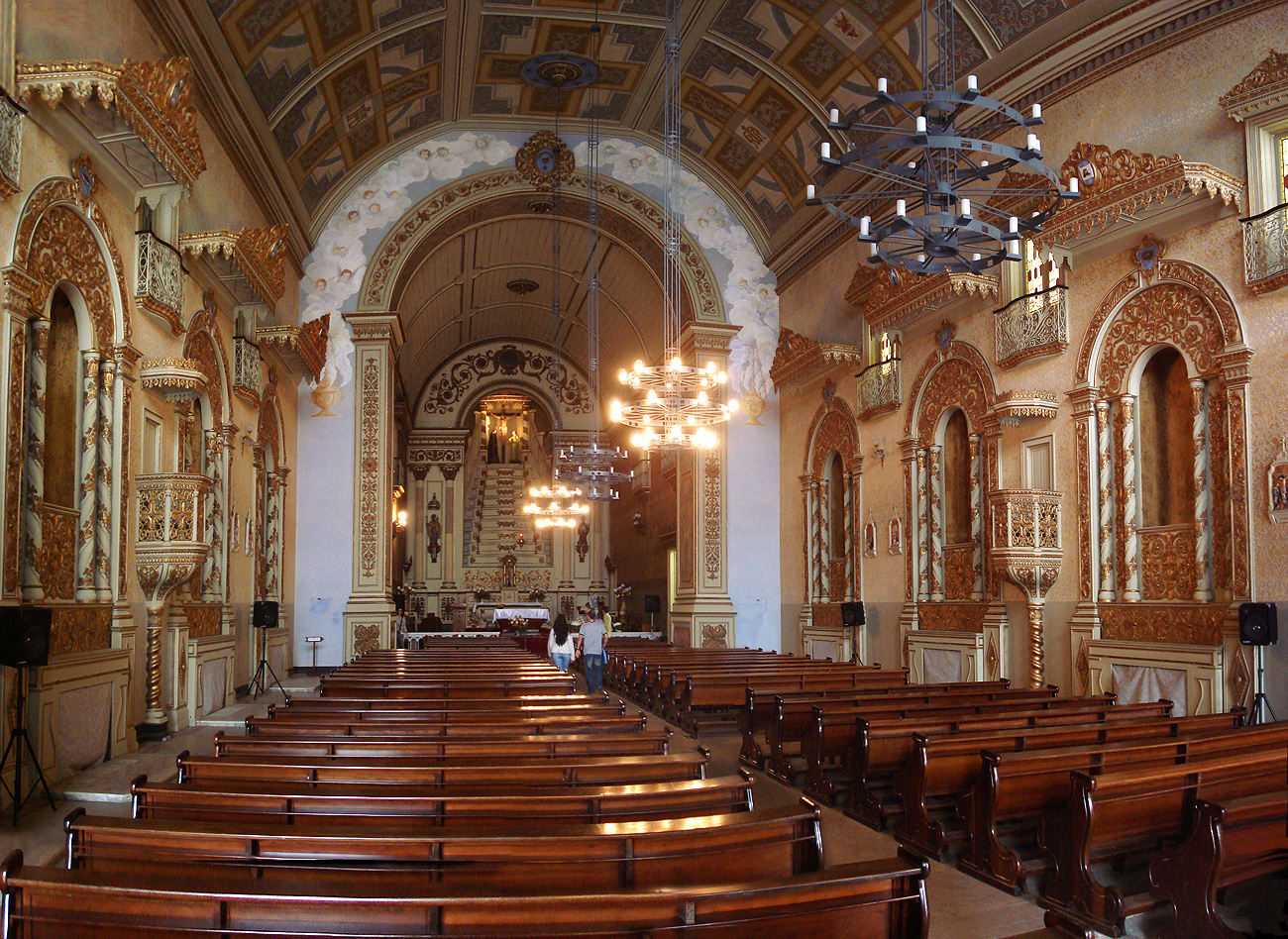
Nave and chancel.

=== Facade ===
The Basilica is located at the top of a hill and is accessed from Andradas Street through an iron gate supported by pillars and a balustrade, which opens onto a churchyard and a monumental staircase. The facade was designed by Júlio Weise in an eclectic style with a Germanic influence and has an imposing volume, with four horizontal levels divided by wide cornices and three vertical blocks represented by the structure of the building and the two side towers, also divided by the continuation of the cornices.

On the first floor, there are three round-arched doors framed in stone, separated by pilasters and Corinthian capitals supporting a cornice decorated with geometric motifs. On the upper level there are three windows with balustrades in line with the doors below, also with round arches. The pilasters are repeated and support a cornice with the inscription VENERÁVEL ORDEM TERCEIRA DE NOSSA SENHORA DAS DORES (English: VENERABLE THIRD ORDER OF OUR LADY OF SORROWS). Three round arched niches were installed on the third level aligned with the windows, where statues by João Vicente Friedrichs depicting Faith, Hope and Charity were placed. On this level, the pilasters are thinner and fewer in number. Above the whole complex stands a triangular pediment on which the date MDCCCC (1900) has been inscribed, flanked by two small pinnacles and crowned by a carved iron cross. Underneath the date is a bas-relief of a heart transfixed by seven swords and surrounded by a crown of thorns, symbolizing Mary's sorrows.

The two side towers are identical in design. Starting with a base decorated with plaster in imitation of dressed stone, a second level rises with a niche pierced by a small ogival window. On the third floor there are open arches for bells, a scheme repeated on the fourth floor, with the difference that on this one there is an oculus above the arch. All levels are flanked by Corinthian pilasters. The volumes of the towers are crowned by complex prismatic corbels with openings and balustrades, terminated by metal wind roses.

=== Interior ===
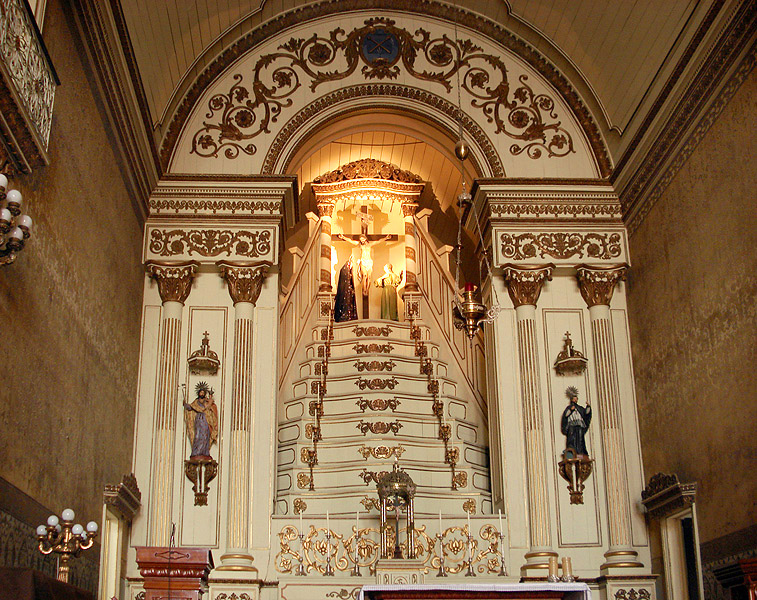
High altar.

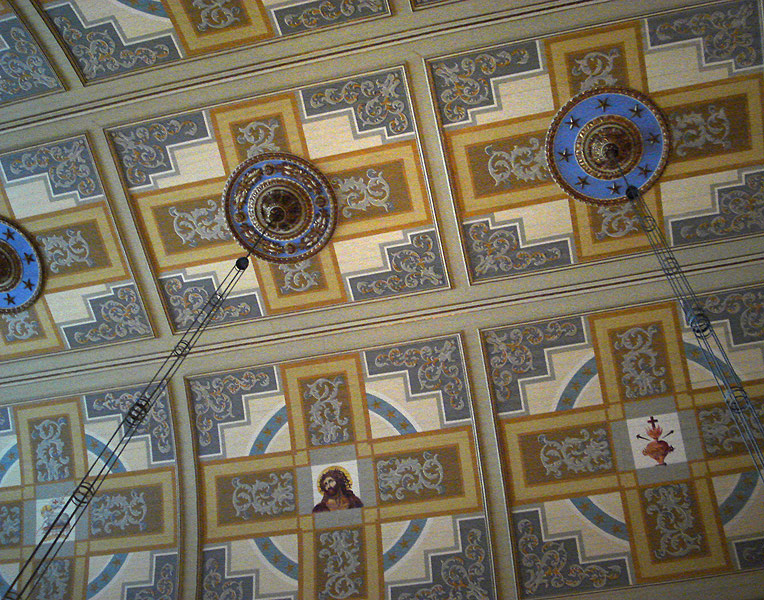
Lining detail.

The interior still has many of the primitive colonial features. The entrance is through three doors, with the central one leading into a glazed windshield. Above is a wooden choir, supported by arches and Corinthian columns. There is a single nave, flanked by a series of altars richly carved and gilded by João do Couto e Silva with a round arched profile and a large decorated frame, Solomonic columns and baldachins, as well as niches for statuary. Also aligned in the nave are several tribunes with stained glass doors and bombée ironwork railings, and two pulpits. The coffered ceiling is painted by Germano Traub in floral and geometric motifs, with figurative medallions. The chandeliers are a contemporary work.

The chancel is bordered by a large round arch with a floral frieze and a painting of cherubs. It also has tribunes and the high altar in a stepped style, with neoclassical features, and a sculptural group at the top with images of Christ on the cross, flanked by the Mater Dolorosa and St. John. From this chancel there are doors to another more simply decorated chapel on the left and administration rooms on the right.

The basilica has several precious statues, including seven images depicting the steps of the Passion of Jesus Christ, brought from Portugal in 1871; two images of the basilica's patron saint, one from 1820, with a porcelain face, and the other from the second half of the 17th century, with a silver sword and diadem; a Saint Francis Xavier, from Italy, and an Immaculate Heart of Mary, from Spain.

The basilica also has a significant collection of artistic and historical pieces that are not in use, such as books, statues, paintings, engravings, decorative objects, furniture, liturgical vestments, ornaments and others. There are plans to set up a sacred art museum with this collection.

== See also ==
- Architecture of Porto Alegre
- History of Porto Alegre
- Baroque in Brazil
