= Andradas Street =

Street in Rio Grande do Sul, Brazil

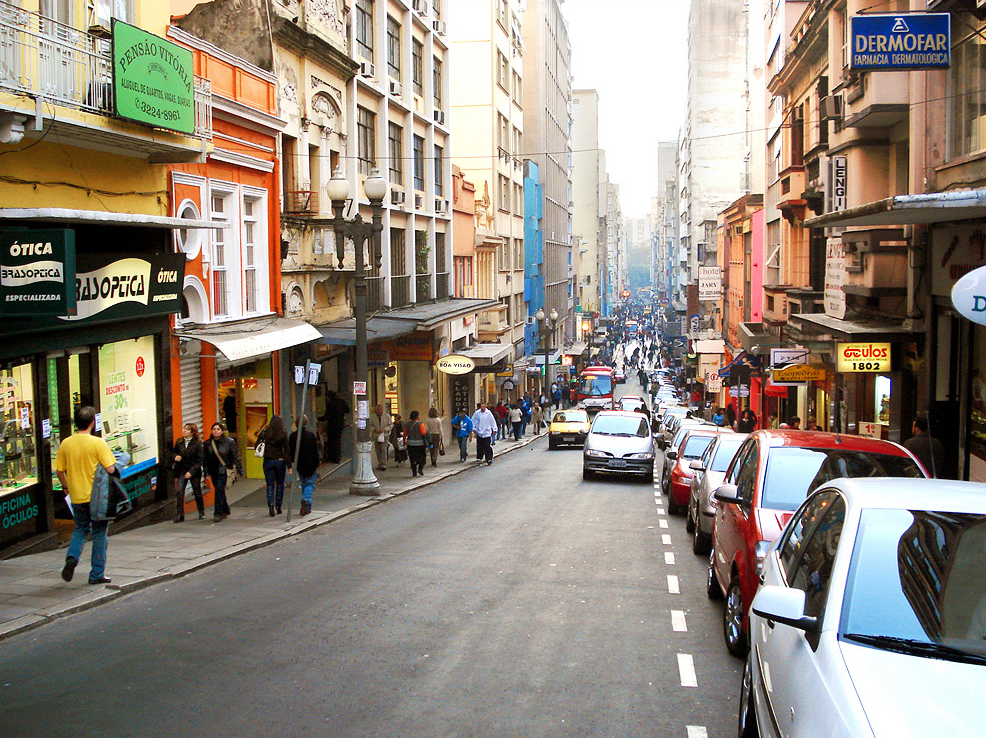
- The stretch between Dom Feliciano and Alfândega squares.
- Former name(s): Rua da Praia; Rua da Graça
- Location: Porto Alegre, Rio Grande do Sul; Brazil
- Coordinates: 30°01′50″S 51°13′54″W

Andradas Street (Portuguese: Rua dos Andradas) is located in the Brazilian city of Porto Alegre, in the state of Rio Grande do Sul. The stretch from Gasômetro to General Câmara was called Rua da Praia, and the stretch between General Câmara and Senhor dos Passos was called Rua da Graça.

== History ==
Located on the banks of the Guaíba River, Andradas Street emerged in 1772 along with the city of Porto Alegre and was one of the main points of urban occupation. The Chapel of Saint Francis of the Wounds, the city's first church, the Navy arsenals and the Royal Warehouses were built on the site. The central section, where Alfândega Square is located today, used to contain the unloading quay and a concentration of merchants. In 1799, it was paved by order of the ombudsman Lourenço José Vieira Souto. Initially named Rua da Graça, it started at Gasômetro and stretched to Ouvidor Street, now General Câmara. In 1843, when the streets were platted and unified, it became Rua da Praia.

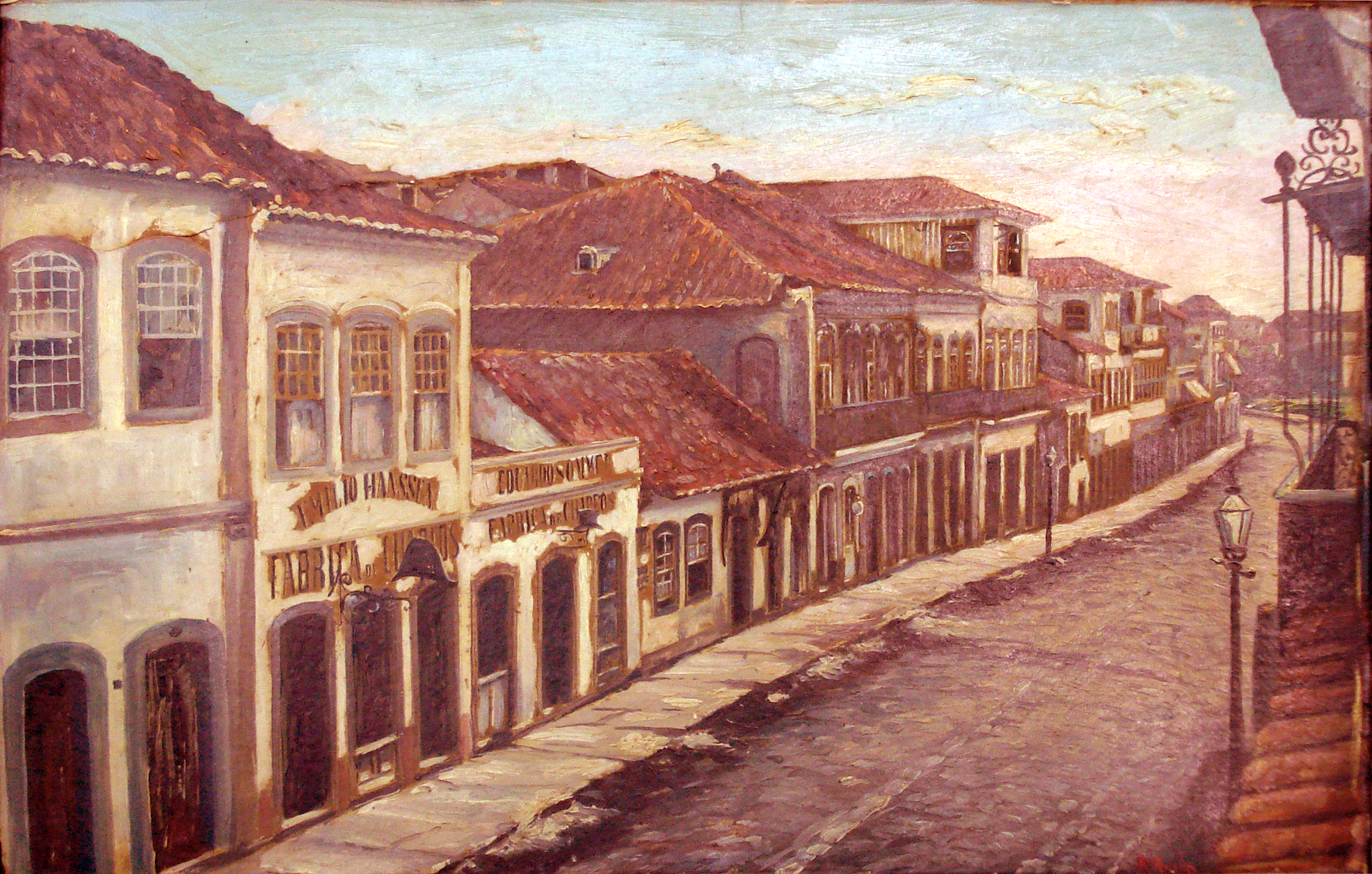
Athayde d'Avila: Rua da Praia, c. 1880. Collection of the Júlio de Castilhos Museum.

Foreign travelers who visited Porto Alegre in the 19th century spoke highly of Andrades Street. In 1820, Auguste de Saint-Hilaire described it as "extremely busy (...) with very well-installed stores, well-assorted sales and workshops of various professions". In 1858, the German Avé-Lallement described it as offering "very majestic houses of up to three floors", which confirms the rapid development of the area. The name Rua dos Andradas was officially incorporated on August 17, 1865, during the preparations for the Independence Day celebrations. At the same time, the street underwent paving in the central part, which ended in 1874. The old irregular stones were replaced by cobblestones in 1885. In 1923, it changed to mosaic granite cobblestones, which still exist in some sections.

Successive landfills along the waterfront moved the street away from the coast. By the middle of the 20th century, it had become a place for wholesalers, elegant shops and a popular meeting place for civic events, attracting numerous patisseries, cinemas and restaurants. The stretch between Doutor Flores and Marechal Floriano streets was listed as a landmark site by municipal decree in 1989. It has a roadbed seven meters long with sidewalks of around 2.5 meters.

== Literature ==
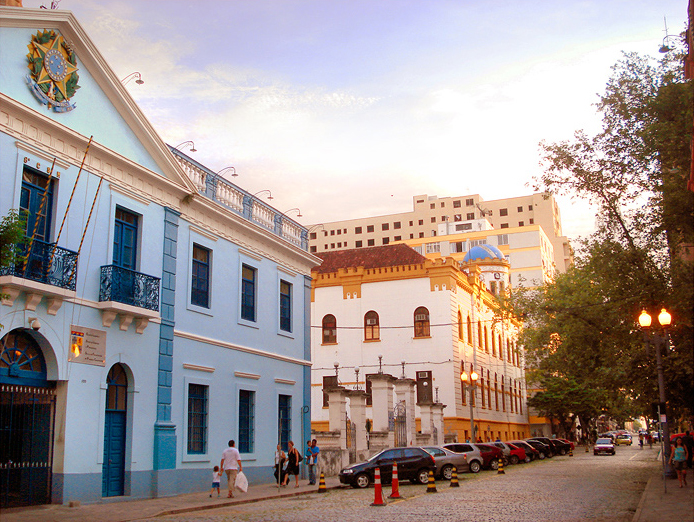
A section near the western end of the street showing part of the historic buildings of the Southern Military Command.

Andradas Street was the setting and protagonist of anecdotes and picturesque cases and served as inspiration for several local writers. In 1852, José Cândido Gomes discussed its peculiarities in the pages of O Mercantil. Zeferino Brasil and Aquiles Porto Alegre also wrote about it. Erico Veríssimo used it as a setting for various scenes in his novels.

== Attractions ==
Andradas Street features several tourist attractions, cultural institutions and architectural monuments in Porto Alegre, such as the Mario Quintana House of Culture, the Minor Basilica of Our Lady of Sorrows, the Hipólito José da Costa Communication Museum and the CEEE Erico Verissimo Cultural Center. It also contains the historic buildings of the Southern Military Command, the Labor Museum, the headquarters of Correio do Povo, Clube do Comércio, Editora Globo and Previdência do Sul, the Cinema Imperial, the Guarany Cinema, the Carvalho Pharmacy, the Alpes Bar and Restaurant, the Chaves Gallery and the Gasômetro Power Station.

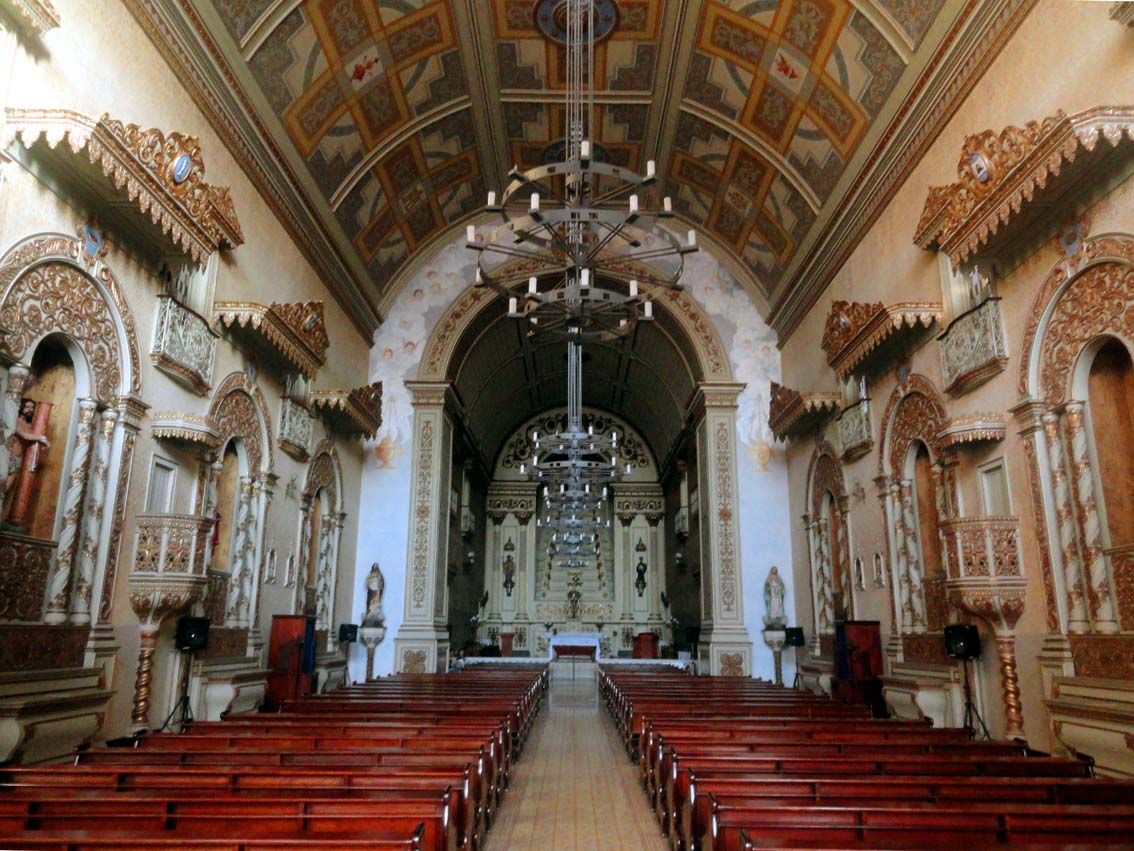
Inside the Minor Basilica of Our Lady of Sorrows, late Baroque style.

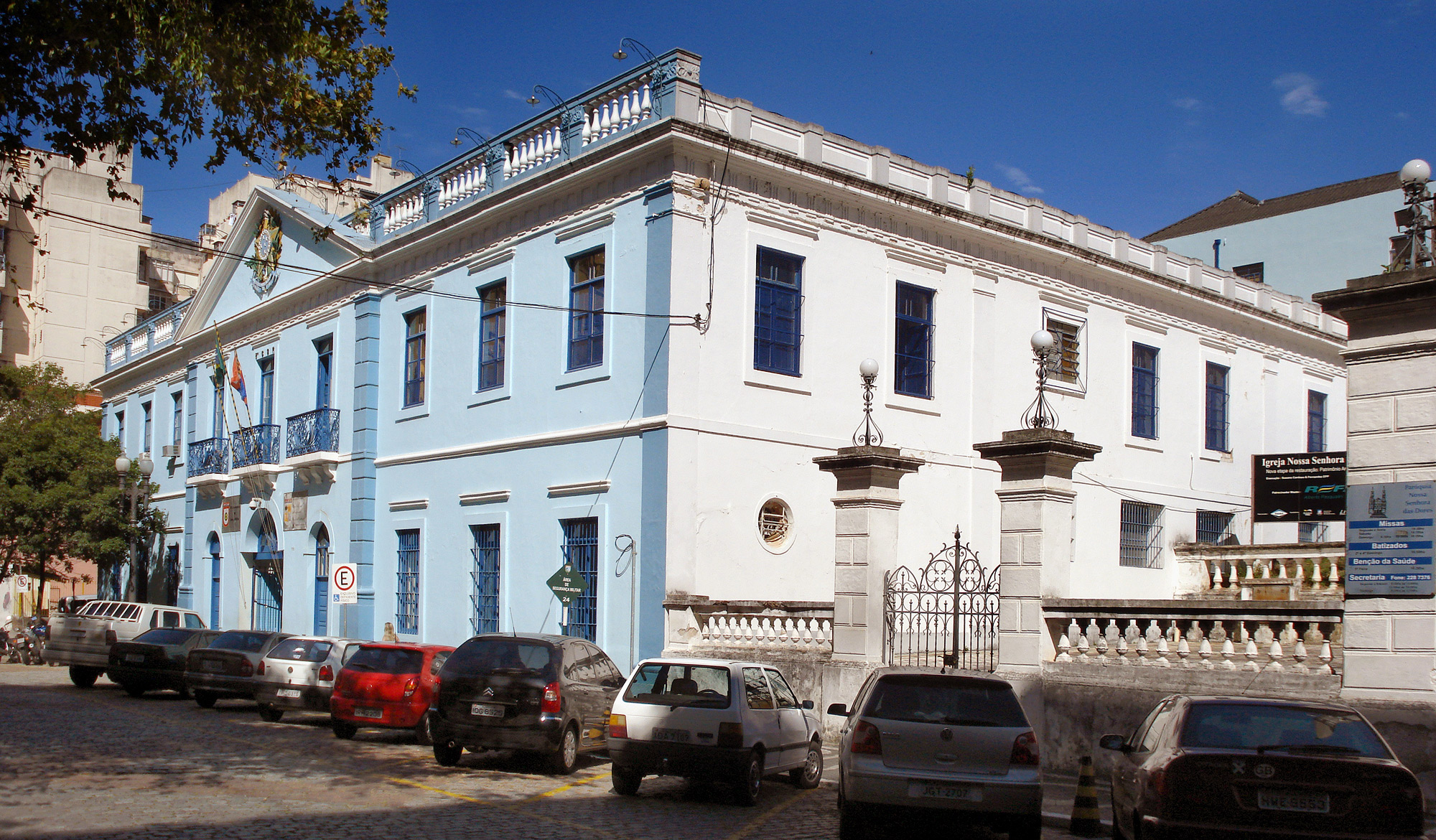
Southern Military Command, Neoclassical.

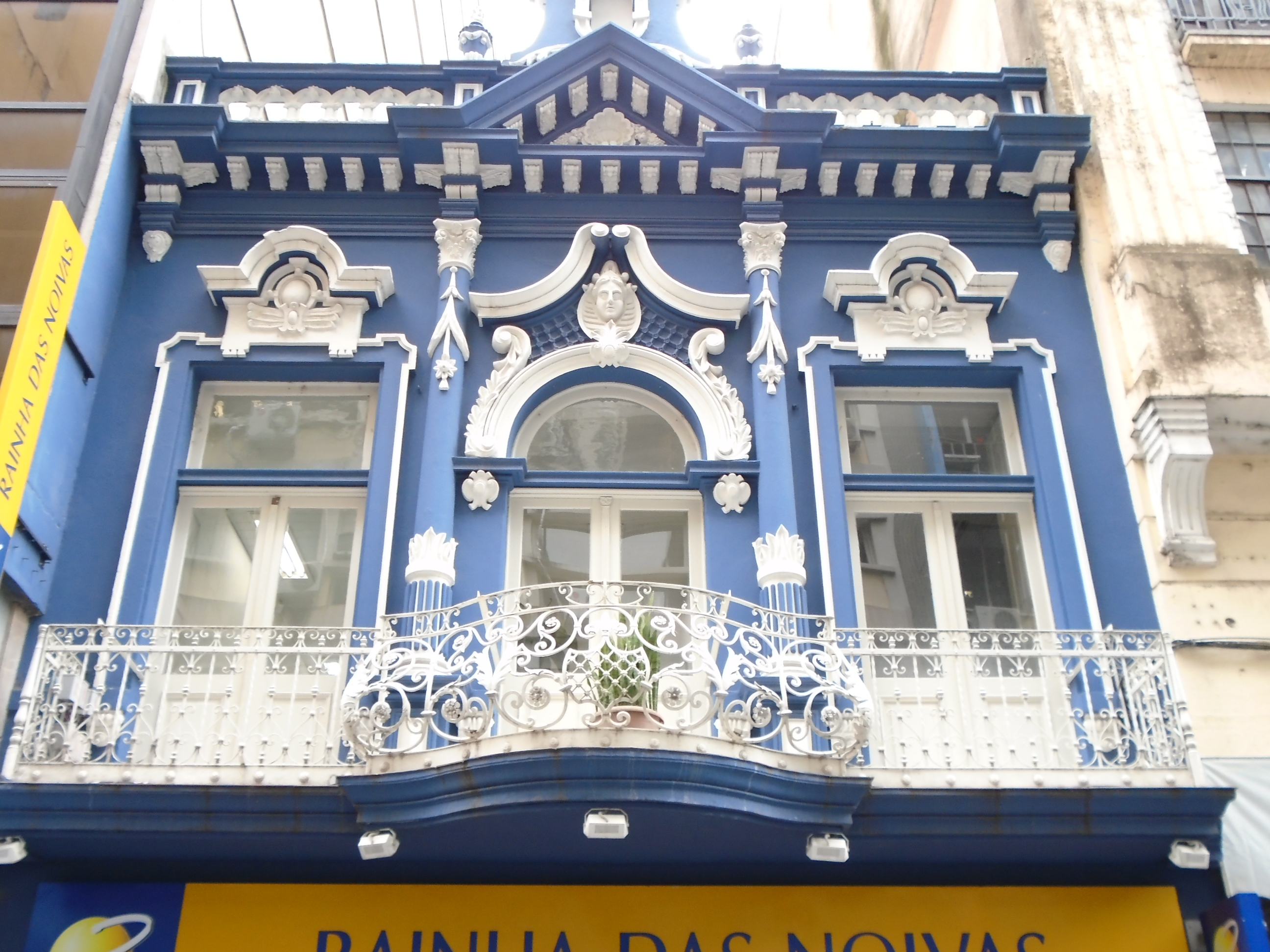
Former residential-commercial house, Eclectic.

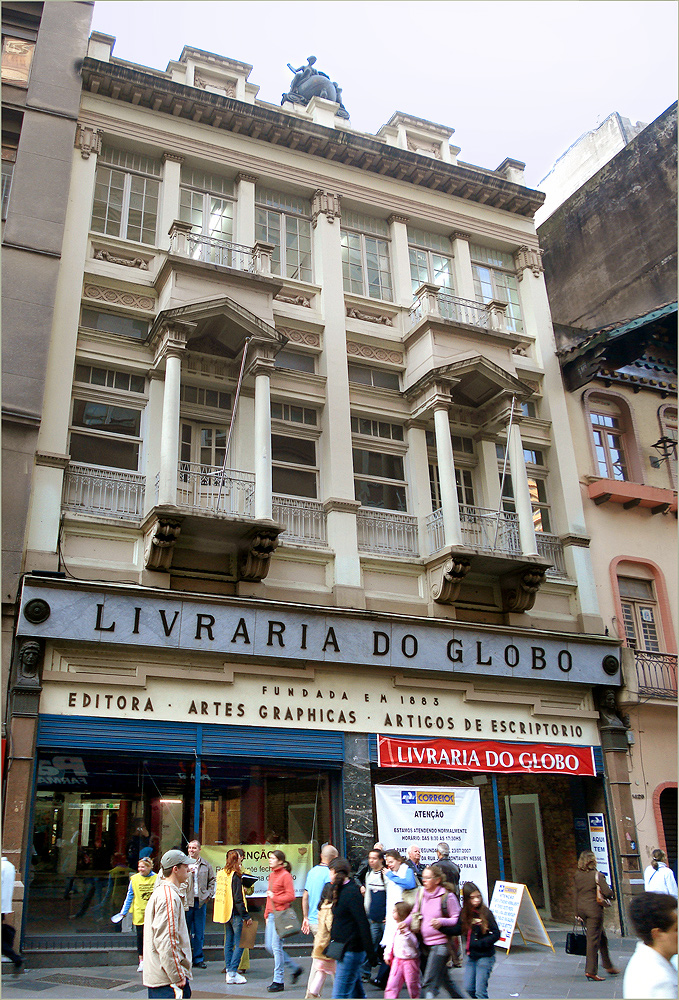
Hipólito José da Costa Communication Museum, Eclectic

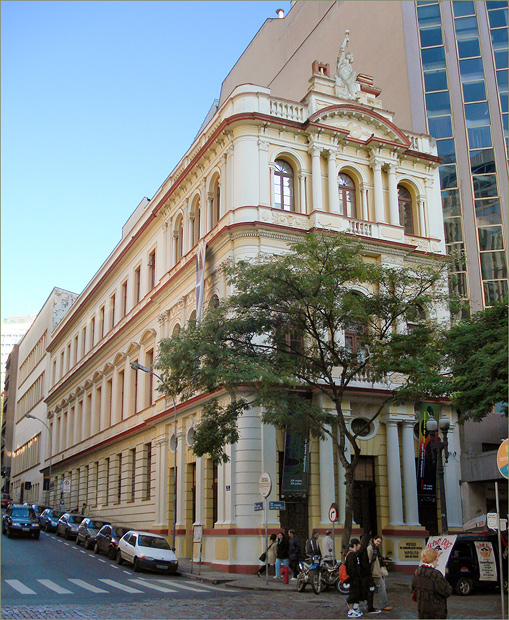
Building of Editora Globo, Eclectic.
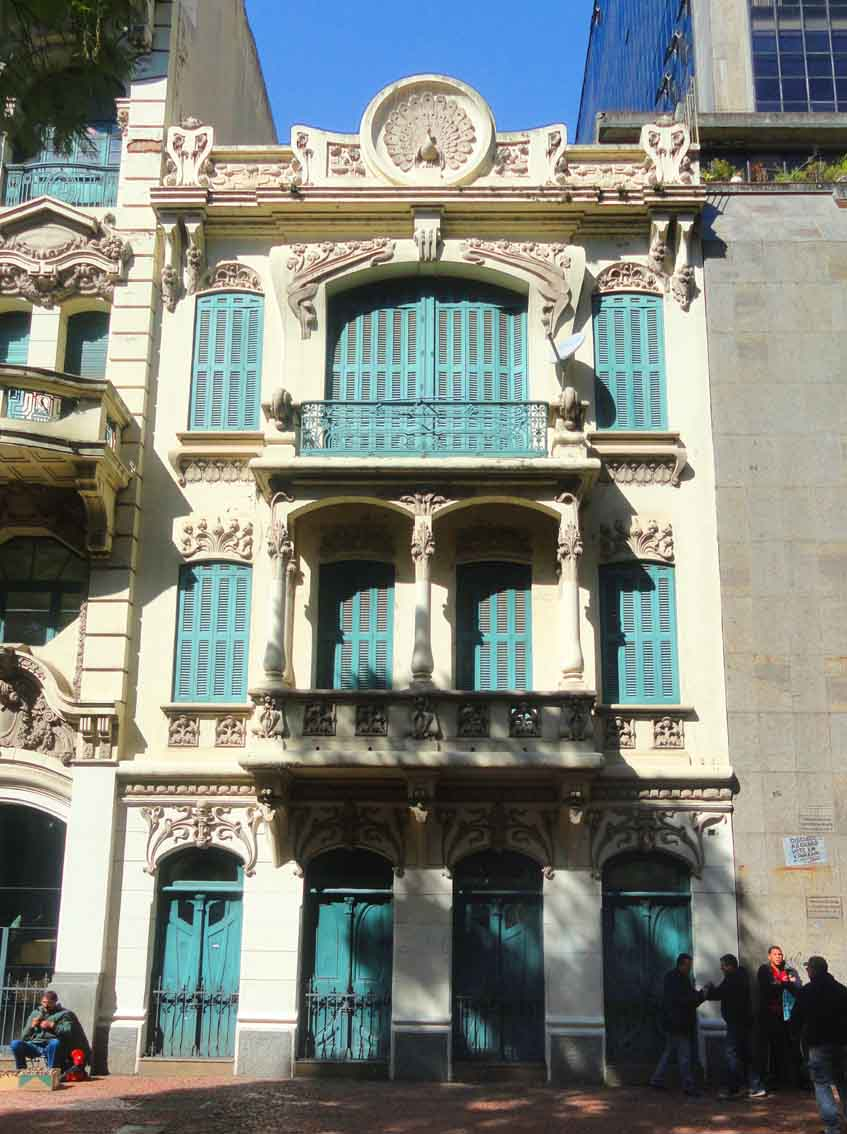
Carvalho Pharmacy, Art Nouveau.

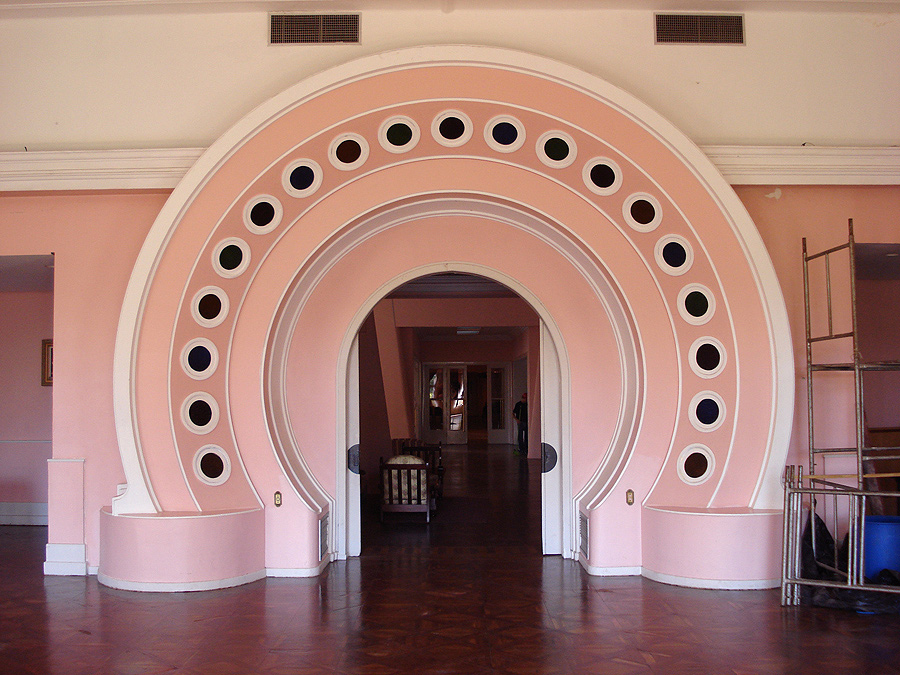
Interior of the Clube do Comércio, Art Deco.

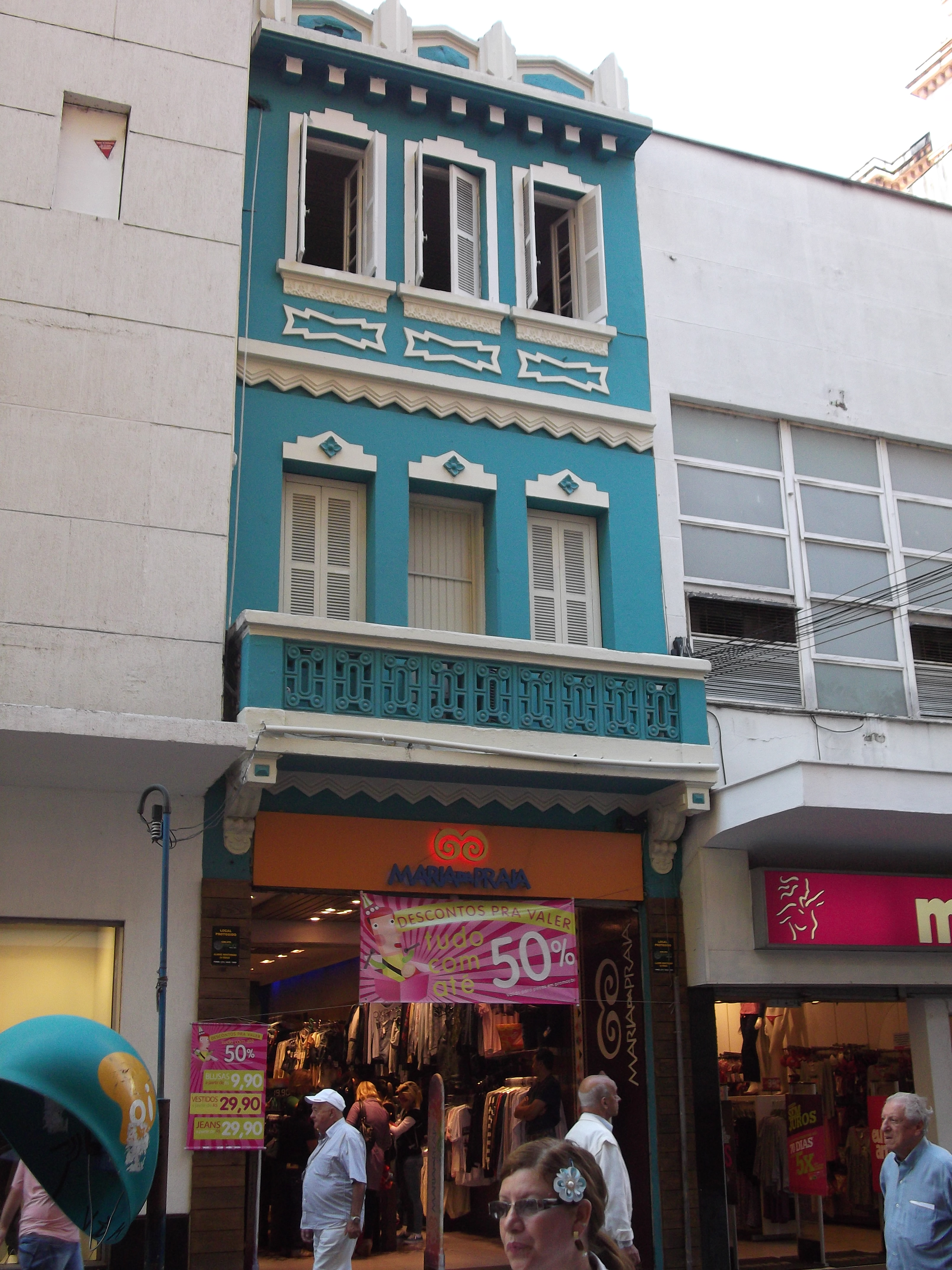
Former residential-commercial house, Art Deco.

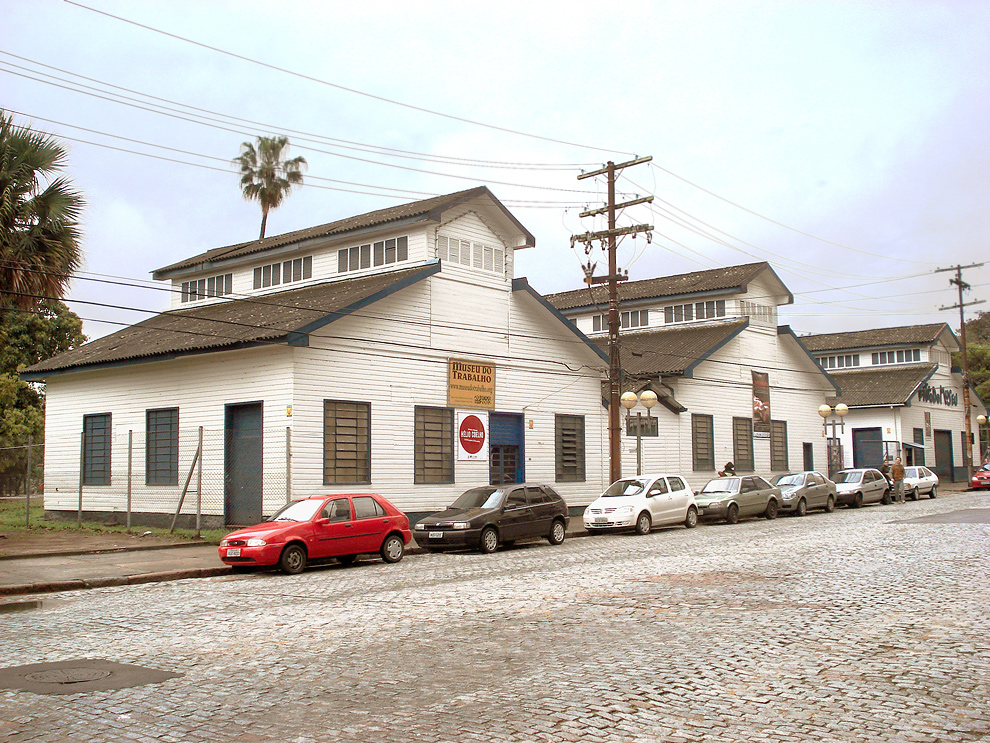
Labor Museum, industrial architecture.

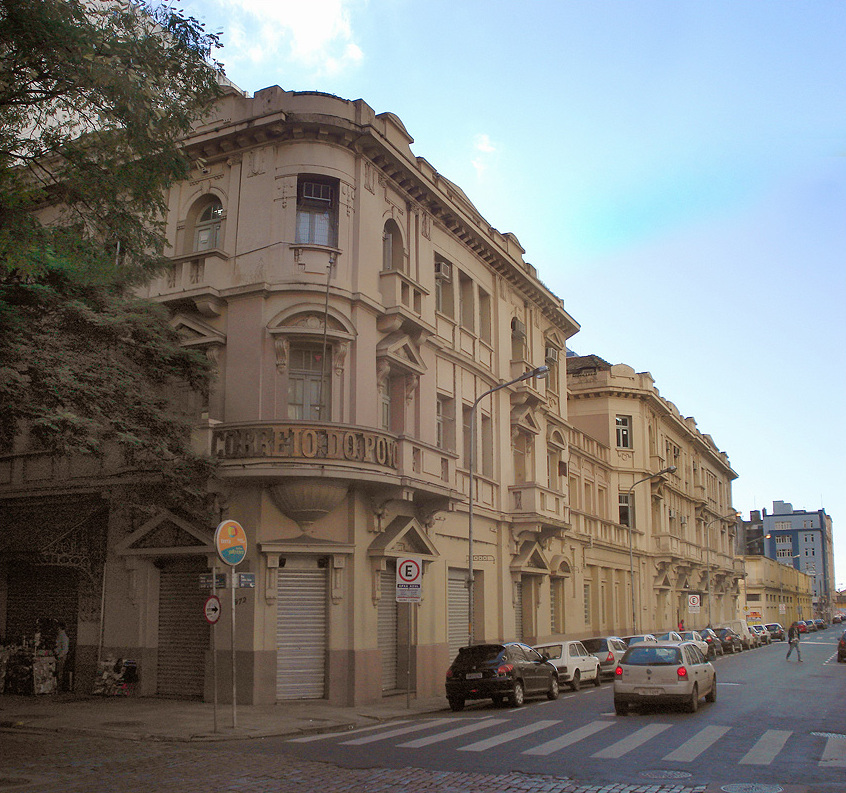
Headquarters of Correio do Povo.

== See also ==
- Architecture of Porto Alegre
- History of Porto Alegre
