= Theo Wiederspahn =

German Brazilian architect (1878–1952)

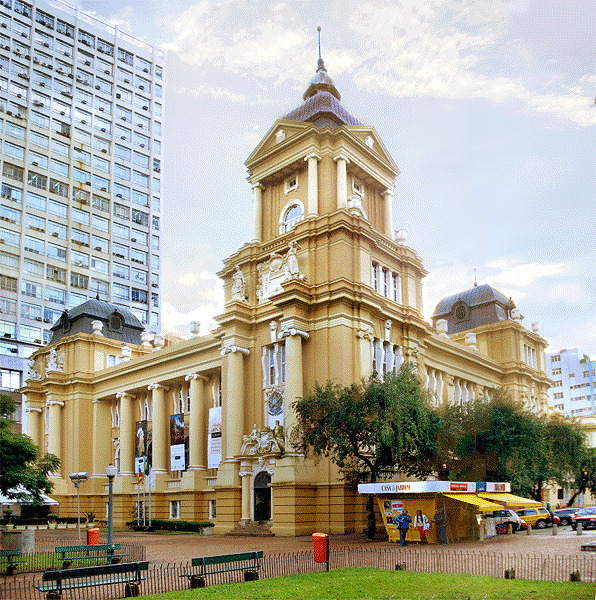
Rio Grande do Sul Museum of Art.

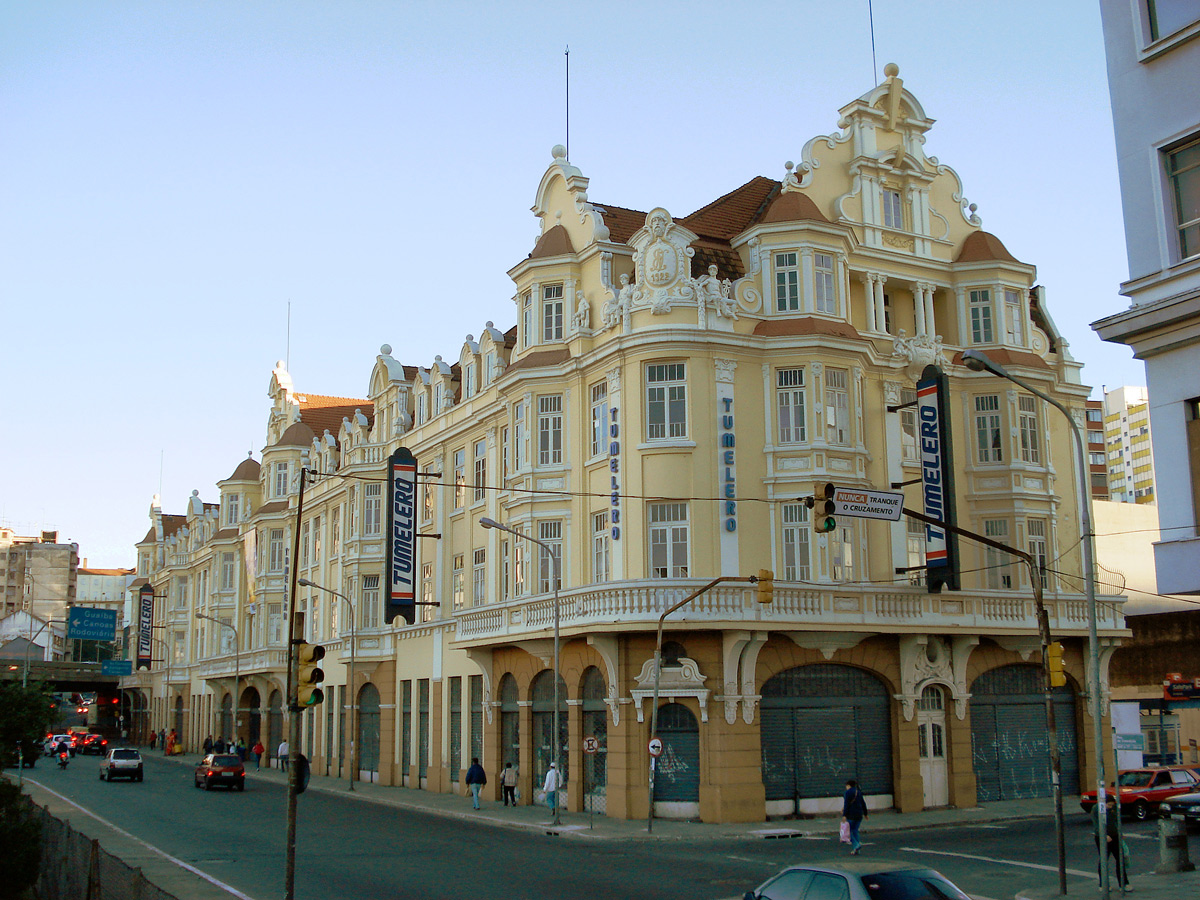
Ely Building in Porto Alegre

Theodor Alexander Josef Wiederspahn (February 19, 1878 – November 12, 1952), also known as Theo Wiederspahn, was a German Brazilian architect. He designed many buildings in Southern Brazil, especially in Porto Alegre city. Other locations include Novo Hamburgo and Cruz Alta.

Born in Wiesbaden, having finished his studies in 1894, Theo Wiederspahn immigrated to Brazil in 1908. He intended to work for “Viação Férrea do Rio Grande do Sul”, a railroad state-owned company, but it never happened because of contract problems. Wiederspahn then started working as an architect for Rudolph Ahrons's engineering firm in Porto Alegre. Together they revolutionized the urban landscape of the city, and many of his works became part of its artistic cultural heritage.
