= Brazilian Revolution of 1930 in Porto Alegre =

1930 uprising in Porto Alegre, Brazil

Revolution of 1930 in Porto Alegre
- Part of the Revolution of 1930
- Revolutionary forces in downtown Porto Alegre, near the 3rd Military Region Headquarters
Date	3–4 October 1930
Location	Porto Alegre, Rio Grande do Sul, Brazil
Result	Revolutionary victory

Belligerents
Revolutionaries; Rio Grande Police; Civil Guard; Tenentist soldiers; Civilian volunteers	Loyalist Army

Commanders and leaders
Getúlio Vargas; Góis Monteiro; Oswaldo Aranha	Gil de Almeida

Strength
	2,000 (Army garrison)

Casualties and losses
- 19–22 killed and 90–100 wounded

Porto Alegre was the primary center of conspiracy during the Revolution of 1930 and the stage of fighting in its early days. The state government of Rio Grande do Sul, led by Getúlio Vargas, organized a national uprising against the Brazilian government of President Washington Luís. State military forces and internal conspirators overpowered the federal Army garrison commanded by General Gil de Almeida. The entire 3rd Military Region either defected to the rebel side or was defeated, paving the way for the revolutionary march on the federal capital and Vargas' inauguration as President of Brazil.

The revolution was scheduled for 17:30 on 3 October, following the end of the workday at the barracks. Its outbreak came as no surprise to the population. The preceding months had been tense, and General Almeida had brought federal reinforcements to Porto Alegre, anticipating a possible confrontation with the state government. Artillery positioned on Menino Deus Hill posed a threat to the city center. Yet, the Army itself was rife with revolutionary sympathizers. Vargas promised to maintain peace, but his subordinates were conspiring with Tenentist officers and representatives from Minas Gerais and Paraíba. The revolutionary General Staff, led by Lieutenant Colonel Góis Monteiro, had been operating clandestinely in Porto Alegre since September.

The revolutionary forces were divided into four groupings, one in reserve and the others for attacks on the regions of the headquarters of the 3rd Military Region, the barracks of the 7th Light Infantry Battalion (7th BC) and Menino Deus Hill, where federal reinforcements were concentrated. Loyalist resistance was sporadic and isolated. Machine guns were sabotaged and officers and soldiers were arrested on the street when they left work. Revolutionaries within the Army deserted and civilian volunteers joined the uprising. General Almeida was arrested inside the HQ after a brief and bloody fight. The 7th BC, in Praça do Portão, resisted throughout the night until signing a ceasefire, and at dawn the next day, a formal surrender.

General Almeida and other loyalist officers were imprisoned aboard the ship Comandante Ribber, anchored in the Guaíba River. Following the victory in Rio Grande do Sul, volunteers enlisted for the military campaign, and the police arrested enemies of the revolution. On 11 October, Vargas handed over the government to Oswaldo Aranha—the revolution's general coordinator—and boarded a train bound for the battlefront and the federal capital, where he would assume power following the revolution's national victory.

== Background ==
=== Political context ===
Vargas (in uniform) and Oswaldo Aranha, on the left, at the Catete Palace after the victory of the revolution

In 1930, Porto Alegre was a modest city with a commercial center bounded by Praia Street and the Guaíba River. As the capital of Rio Grande do Sul, it would serve as the main hub of the conspiracy behind the Revolution of 1930. The state held a unique position within the First Brazilian Republic's federal system: it stood outside the traditional dominant axis of São Paulo and Minas Gerais, and yet it was powerful enough to challenge for central authority. Getúlio Vargas, state governor since 1928, healed the wounds of past civil wars by incorporating the former opposition into his administration. The Rio-Grandense Republican Party (PRR) and the Libertador Party united to form the Frente Única Gaúcha.

Internal unification was followed by an alliance with Minas Gerais and Paraíba to launch Vargas' candidacy in the 1930 presidential election. The alliance members knew that the country's electoral system would not allow for a peaceful opposition victory; indeed, the results designated Júlio Prestes—also from São Paulo—to succeed Washington Luís, who was likewise from São Paulo. Even before the election, the radical wing of politicians from Rio Grande do Sul—represented by Oswaldo Aranha, João Neves da Fontoura, Batista Luzardo, and Flores da Cunha—was plotting an armed revolt against the government. In September 1929, Vargas sent the first emissaries to contact—in prison and in exile—the Tenentist military officers who had attempted to overthrow the government during the previous decade.

In late 1929, Vargas and Aranha met in Porto Alegre with Luís Carlos Prestes, a hero of the Tenentist movement. They provided funds for him to purchase weapons, but he was already too much at odds with his associates. In May 1930, he broke with the conspirators, labeling the Liberal Alliance "bourgeois." The radical wing still had to overcome resistance within the PRR, such as that of former governor Borges de Medeiros. Vargas himself was cautious and avoided making an open commitment. Senator Firmino Paim Filho was tasked with reassuring Washington Luís, whose administration had feared a rebellion ever since the election results. It was known that, should one occur, it would begin in Rio Grande do Sul and involve the Military Brigade and provisional units.

The conspirators decided that the movement would be headquartered in Rio Grande do Sul, with Oswaldo Aranha providing general coordination and separate leaders for the civilian and military wings. Rumors of an insurrection were mounting, and the state government's mobilization for a conflict was evident. Everyone knew that the revolution would come sooner or later. Speeches were inflammatory, and the press stoked patriotic fervor. By September, rumors circulated that the decisive moment would arrive during the Independence Day parade.

=== Military alignment ===
The 8th Light Infantry Battalion, an Army unit based in Rio Grande do Sul, in Rio de Janeiro after the victory of the revolution

The inhabitants of Rio Grande do Sul were thought to have a military vocation. Between a quarter and a third of Brazil's Army was stationed in Rio Grande do Sul; many of the military personnel were Rio Grande do Sul natives, and the Army identified politically with the PRR. The state government relied on the Military Brigade—a true "state army"—and on irregular troops in the countryside. Porto Alegre was an exception among the state's municipalities, as the number of state troops there exceeded that of the Army garrison. The Army had approximately fourteen thousand men in Rio Grande do Sul, distributed across two units with over a thousand men, ten with five hundred to a thousand men, eight with three hundred to five hundred men, and one with two hundred men. All garrisons—including the one in Porto Alegre—were better equipped for combat than the state troops.

These dispersed garrisons, composed of soldiers recruited from the local population, were vulnerable to revolutionary psychological infiltration. Federal military personnel serving in Rio Grande do Sul were constantly urged to side with the revolution. They were targeted by speeches, pamphlets, press publications, private conversations, and offers of money. Soldiers were told: "A gaúcho does not fight against a gaúcho." Officers were appealed to on the grounds of patriotism and promised a military-dominated regime. Several colonels warned the regional command about these attempts to win them over.

The Army garrisons in Rio Grande do Sul reported to the 3rd Military Region, headquartered in Porto Alegre and commanded by General Gil Antônio Dias de Almeida, who remained loyal to the government until the end. He repeatedly warned the Minister of War, General Nestor Sezefredo dos Passos, about subversion within the ranks. The responses, when they came, were tepid. The Army maintained a makeshift surveillance service that paled in comparison to the police intelligence network. Infiltrated conspirators withheld information from the commander—particularly regarding the spread of sedition in the countryside—while keeping the revolutionary leadership apprised of all measures and resources within the 3rd Military Region.

Signs were everywhere: mysterious troop movements, ammunition thefts, and rumors. At General Almeida’s insistence, ammunition shipments were postponed. By early October, the stockpiles in Porto Alegre and Rio Grande totaled fewer than 400,000 rounds—a figure that included eighty crates of munitions delivered on the 2nd at the behest of the ordnance directorate. Yet, Intelligence Bulletin No. 18, forwarded by the regional command to the Ministry of War, remained optimistic: the Military Brigade was loyal and prepared to defend the institutions. Ambassador Hélio Lobo, in conversations with Uruguayan officials, asserted that "the police brigade and the conservative classes" would not join any movement against the federal government. In Rio de Janeiro, Washington Luís exuded confidence that an uprising was out of the question.

=== Army reinforcements ===
Newspaper on 6 September: "Rio Grande up in arms!" "A veritable concentration of forces is taking place in this capital."

In late August, General Almeida proposed to the Minister of War a defensive concentration of troops in the countryside, a proposal rejected on the grounds that "the danger of revolution had passed." In September, informed by reliable sources that the revolt was imminent, the general summoned the Secretary of the Interior, João Simplício. Almeida had been his student at the Military College. He stated he felt compelled to reinforce the Porto Alegre garrison if Vargas did not take decisive measures to reassure the public, rather than maintaining "his indecisive and highly contradictory attitude." João Simplício tried to dissuade him, arguing that political necessity prevented Vargas from breaking ties with extremist elements.

Bringing reinforcements to Porto Alegre would expose the commander to fierce criticism. Even if the reinforcements succeeded in preventing the revolution, they would still be criticized as an excessive provocation. Faced with the state government's refusals, General Almeida accepted the risk and ordered the deployment of a battalion from the 9th Infantry Regiment (based in Rio Grande), the 8th and 9th Light Infantry Battalions (BCs) (from São Leopoldo and Caxias do Sul), and a company from the 7th Infantry Regiment (from Santa Maria). He assumed full responsibility for these troop movements in his report to the Minister of War. According to his memoirs, the Ministry sent a radiogram broadly authorizing the mobilization, but the message was intercepted by an officer involved in the conspiracy.

The reinforcements were stationed on Menino Deus Hill. The area housed the headquarters of the 3rd Military Region as well as the barracks for the Regional Quartermaster Service, the 7th Light Infantry Battalion (BC), and the 2.ª Companhia de Estabelecimentos. Menino Deus Hill housed the 4th Squadron of the 3rd Divisional Cavalry Regiment (IV/3rd RCD), an artillery battery from the Reserve Officers' Training Center (CPOR), and the General Staff contingent. (Note: The Commission for the General Mapping of Brazil (CCGB), based in Porto Alegre, was a unit dedicated to the topographic surveying of strategic areas. It operated under this name from 1903 to 1932.) It possessed its own water supply, the main depots for small-arms and artillery ammunition, and other strategic advantages for withstanding a prolonged siege and providing cover for units within the city.

In total, the Army had two thousand well-supplied troops in Porto Alegre, 1,500 of whom were stationed on Menino Deus Hill. A defense plan was in place, featuring designated targets for artillery bombardment of the city. In one of his bulletins, General Almeida asserted that "any one of our platoons [...] will suffice to break up any band, however large. And for us, this is a matter of honor."

=== Rumors and accusations ===
The vacillations of the Rio Grande do Sul revolution: in July, O Malho (from Rio de Janeiro) depicts the moderate Borges de Medeiros brushing aside Oswaldo Aranha's "war preparations," "threats," and "revolution"

General Almeida’s memoirs attribute the postponement of the revolution—originally scheduled for September—to this military redeployment. On the 6th, the PRR's official organ, A Federação, protested: "Let no one attempt, through this sudden and unjustifiable concentration of forces and war materiel in an open city, to create the impression that an attempt is being made to coerce the Rio Grande government via threats or violence." General Almeida viewed this statement as a betrayal by Vargas. João Simplício tried to appease him, reiterating that the statement had been published due to political exigencies. During the 7 September parade, the public greeted the Military Brigade with applause but met the Army with silence. Following the statement, the press unleashed a campaign of rumors regarding the general, reporting his supposedly imminent dismissal. The Military Brigade concentrated several units near Menino Deus Hill.

On 28 September, João Simplício returned from a meeting with Borges de Medeiros, asserting that "the State needs peace; revolution is now more impossible than ever. Dr. Getúlio is of the same mind." The general, who had been a classmate of Vargas at the Military College, remained skeptical. Whenever he communicated directly with Vargas, the latter would reassure him and blame his younger political allies—such as Aranha—while maintaining that he himself could not make any public statement calling for peace.

The final ten days of September were calmer. Reports indicated tranquility across the rest of the country. The federal government withdrew the reinforcements that had previously been sent to Belo Horizonte, the capital of Minas Gerais. Rumors subsided, and both Borges de Medeiros and Vargas offered promises of peace. A company from the 7th Infantry Regiment was ordered back to Santa Maria. The units from São Leopoldo and Caxias do Sul were to remain in the capital only until the new recruits took their oath to the flag.

In early October, the press reported on an alleged closed-door conversation between Vargas and General Almeida regarding the artillery positioned on Menino Deus Hill. The general reportedly replied that he could only withdraw them "upon an express order from the Federal Government." Vargas is said to have responded by ordering him to "remove your cannons from their current location, for otherwise, the Military Brigade will do the job." Rio de Janeiro's Correio da Manhã reported how "the cannons, with their barrels aimed at the city, unleashed all manner of alarming rumors." According to Porto Alegre's Diário de Notícias, Vargas instructed his secretary to escort the general out after the refusal. The Ministry of War issued an official statement assuring that relations between the military command and the state government remained cordial.

=== Planning ===
Revolutionary Army General Staff. Seated in the center: Góis Monteiro

In April 1930, following the split with Luís Carlos Prestes, the conspirators sought a military leader for the revolution. After two other officers refused, they pressured Lieutenant Colonel Pedro Aurélio de Góis Monteiro. He had been a key loyalist in the fight against the Prestes Column years earlier and was assuming a command in the countryside of Rio Grande do Sul. Although he considered himself a loyalist, his dissatisfaction prevailed, and he ultimately accepted the role. He was not a native of Rio Grande do Sul, but he had relatives in the state, a factor that influenced his decision. He took some time to accept the assignment, though he had been sounded out as early as the beginning of the year, when he met Vargas at the Piratini Palace.

Communications between Porto Alegre and his post in São Luiz were difficult, but Góis Monteiro managed to use his sister's illness in the state capital as a pretext. In early September, he succeeded in traveling to Porto Alegre. He clandestinely organized his revolutionary headquarters at the home of one of Oswaldo Aranha's sisters. He appointed Virgílio de Melo Franco as secretary, João Alberto Lins de Barros and Newton Estillac Leal as deputy chiefs, and Herculino Cascardo to the intelligence sector. The location was also frequented by Ricardo Hall and the brothers of both Aranha and João Alberto. Plans and orders were drafted from 22:00 until the early hours of the morning. Osvaldo Aranha's agents provided copies of messages from the regional command.

Surprise raids were to seize the garrisons in Porto Alegre, Cachoeira, Santa Maria, Cruz Alta, Passo Fundo, Santana, São Gabriel, and Rio Grande within 24 hours. The uprising was intended to be simultaneous across the country, but victory in Rio Grande do Sul—securing control over the 14,000 Army soldiers there before advancing beyond the state—was considered crucial. The start date was postponed several times until it fell on 3 October—the day Lieutenant Juracy Magalhães' company was on duty at the João Pessoa barracks. The 17:30 time was chosen to take advantage of the officers leaving at the end of the workday, leaving the headquarters nearly empty. The plan to storm the 3rd Military Region headquarters was finalized on 1 October. Vargas, Aranha, Góis Monteiro, and Colonel Claudino Nunes Pereira—commander of the Military Brigade—participated in the meeting.

At 11:00 on 2 October, the telegrams arrived:

From São Gabriel — "Acknowledged. Regards. Camilo Mércio."

From Passo Fundo — "Received; I understand it is set for the 3rd at 17:00. Please confirm if Marcelino Ramos has been notified. — Miguel Costa."

From Bagé — "Your coded message acknowledged. Measures taken. Col. Juvêncio."

From Tupanciretã — "Received notice only late today. Acknowledged; taking measures. Marcial Terra."

From Cachoeira — "Day, time, connection, and support understood. Major Argemiro Dorneles."

From Curitiba — "Secret telegram received. Acknowledged. Vicente de Castro."

From Itaqui — "Received. Units standing by. All is well. Awaiting orders. Mandadori."

From Paraíba — "Received; requesting permission to begin the march in the early hours of the 4th. Juarez Távora."

=== 3 October, before H-hour ===
Protesters in Porto Alegre during the revolution

3 October began with a light drizzle and normal activity in Porto Alegre. General Almeida visited the ophthalmologist at the Military Hospital; he was paying the price for the excessive late-night work of recent weeks. Newspapers carried the obituary of Honório Lemes. That morning, the Military Brigade Headquarters hosted the commanders of the capital's units to distribute the day's operational orders. Lieutenant Afonso Henrique de Miranda Correia, General Gil’s aide-de-camp, sought out Góis Monteiro that morning. He offered to join the movement. Góis Monteiro advised him that loyalty was paramount, given that he was a trusted confidant of the general.

Oswaldo Aranha, Maurício Cardoso, and Luís Aranha—accompanied by their wives—along with Virgílio de Melo Franco, had lunch at the Grande Hotel. The atmosphere was already heavy. Maurício Cardoso said his goodbyes to his cousin, Major Otávio Cardoso, whom he knew to be a loyalist. By this time, saboteurs had likely already removed the breechblocks from the artillery pieces on Menino Deus Hill and the firing pins from the machine guns in the headquarters tower. Osvaldo and Virgílio went to meet Góis Monteiro, João Alberto, Estillac Leal, Hercolino Cascardo, and Pinheiro de Andrade at the house serving as the revolutionary General Staff headquarters.

At 13:00, an alert reached headquarters that Oswaldo Aranha was set to release a revolutionary manifesto at a rally in downtown Porto Alegre. General Almeida called João Simplício and secured a promise from him to confer with Vargas. Anonymous phone calls warned that the conflict would erupt within the next few hours. Had Army intelligence been monitoring phone lines, it would have detected the suspicious messages delivered in a female voice: "Look, the patient has taken a turn for the worse; his condition is critical, requiring immediate surgery. The operation will be performed this afternoon." Men would leave their homes and gather in groups for their missions.

It was said that the movement would begin within a few hours. Oral accounts confirm that the population was not caught off guard; in the mid-afternoon, a soldier on horseback reportedly rode down Lopo Gonçalves Street, shouting, "The Revolution has begun! Stay indoors, close your windows!" Schools and shops closed early. The magazine Revista do Globo, looking back the following year, recalled the mood of "dramatic anticipation" and the "atmosphere of pure revolution":

A martial frenzy seized the popular spirit. There were no somber expressions betraying deep apprehension; instead, a smile of spontaneous, irrepressible joy lit up every face. While this spectacle unfolded in the streets, apparent calm reigned in the federal troop barracks. One might have thought the Army was oblivious to it all, yet it was no secret to anyone that conspiracies were brewing within its ranks—and that it was with its support that the idol of a false and monstrous legality would be consumed in the struggle's purifying fire.

Oral history, however, attests to considerable apprehension among the populace. Accounts such as those in Revista do Globo were written after a victorious movement that had stirred the masses.

At 15:00, Colonel Leitão de Carvalho reported the occupation of the Post Office building in Passo Fundo by armed civilians. Shortly thereafter, he reported that the mayor had banned the sale of any supplies to his regiment. General Almeida ordered the Porto Alegre garrison to be put on alert. He issued orders for combat readiness, which were not obeyed. According to his memoirs, Colonel Toledo Bordini—commander of the 9th Light Infantry Battalion (BC) and the task force stationed on Menino Deus Hill—concealed the orders and dismissed officers and soldiers, effectively allowing them to be arrested on the street. Minutes before the outbreak of hostilities, Lieutenant Colonel Galdino Esteves, commander of the 8th BC, ordered the officers to mess and had the meal served at the shooting range at the foot of the hill. He reportedly said: "Eat a hearty dinner, for you may not have lunch tomorrow."

Alarming news kept coming in: in Alegrete, groups had been moving about since the early hours, rounding up horses and recruiting reservists; from Bagé, Colonel Meira de Vasconcelos reported receiving word that the movement would erupt that very day. The general sent a lieutenant to warn Vargas, who stated "that measures would be taken." The state government announced it was sending police to deal with a strike at the port docks. In reality, the mission was to seize the ships and disable the radio stations.

An anonymous letter reportedly informed the general that the movement would begin at 17:00, with an immediate attack on the headquarters. The general ordered his Chief of Staff, Colonel Firmo Freire do Nascimento, to walk around the block and check for anything unusual. He returned reporting that nothing was amiss, and the general ordered the letter forwarded to the commander of the Military Brigade, with whom he had a good relationship. In the margin, he wrote: "Colonel Claudino. This is further proof of the existence of idlers. Gen. Gil." By the time the colonel received the letter, the officers' families living at the Military Brigade headquarters had already abandoned the site, and Claudino himself was waiting for transport to evacuate his own family.

At 17:00, headquarters was informed that civil guards and civilians had stormed the Chief of Staff's home and that police were in the streets arresting Army officers and soldiers as they left their barracks. The fact that personnel were leaving at the end of the workday indicated that the order for a state of readiness had not reached everyone. Captain Corseill, commander of the 2.ª Companhia de Estabelecimentos, was ordered to proceed to his unit via less-traveled streets, alerting the 7th Infantry Battalion (BC) along the way. Major Arnaldo Soares, chief of the General Staff's 1st Section, was ordered to ready the headquarters guard troops. In the final moments, General Almeida telephoned Vargas. After being answered by a cabinet officer who promised to fetch the governor, he realized the connection had been cut. When he tried to call back, he heard the first shots.

Virgílio de Melo Franco recalled: "I found Mr. Getúlio Vargas entirely alone, pacing back and forth with his hands clasped behind his back. As soon as he spotted me, he said: 'Dr. Fernando Abreu Pereira [director of the Rio-Grandense Railway Network] has just informed me that General Gil de Almeida is fully aware of everything.'" "It seemed appropriate, then, to warn Oswaldo so that he would hasten the coup." The plan was for the shops to be closing and the streets filled with workers heading home. However, the news had been circulating since early afternoon, and the streets were packed with onlookers.

== Plan execution ==
The operations plan assigned three task groups to specific zones of the city, plus a reserve group and orders for smaller units. The HQ Group, under the command of Oswaldo Aranha, was to seize the 3rd Military Region Headquarters, the War Arsenal, the Quartermaster Corps, the Telegraph and Post offices, the Port Authority, the Fiscal Agency, and other federal offices. Operating in the M/D Zone (Menino Deus) were the Military Brigade's 2nd Infantry Battalion and a section of the Machine Gun Group, under Lieutenant Colonel Barcelos. In Zone R (Military College, Companhia de Estabelecimentos, and 7th BC Barracks), the force comprised the 3rd Infantry Battalion and 120 men from the Vehicle Inspectorate, under Lieutenant Colonel João de Deus Canabarro Cunha. The Reserve Group consisted of the 1st Infantry Battalion, the Recruit Depot, and the Machine Gun Group, under Major Alzimiro Francisco Wellausen; at H-Hour, it was to take up position in the Cemetery area. The Presidential Escort and other elements were to stand by at Palace Square. Should there be significant resistance, flamethrowers, mine launchers, and the automatic weapons and artillery to be seized in Menino Deus were available for use.

At 17:25, a flare fired from Menino Deus Hill signaled the start. The revolutionaries attacked Army units and occupied the Post and Telegraph buildings, the Fiscal Agency, the Customs House, and the Bank of Brazil. The Presidential Escort maintained security around the Government Palace and in the Navegantes, São João, Floresta, and Monte Serrat zones.

For the loyalists, it was a moment of disorder. Commanders who were not immediately arrested issued orders, but not all subordinates obeyed. The sound of gunfire could be heard across the city, and bullets struck the walls of the barracks. Cavalry detachments and infantry platoons moved through the city center. Residents took cover from the shooting, while crowds in the streets rushed forward, waving handkerchiefs and either carrying weapons or asking for them in order to join the conflict. There was a gaúcho culture of active participation in political events and of carrying—or at the very least possessing—firearms. Among the volunteers were young men from the elite, including the sons of Flores da Cunha and the brothers of Oswaldo Aranha.

=== Military Region Headquarters ===
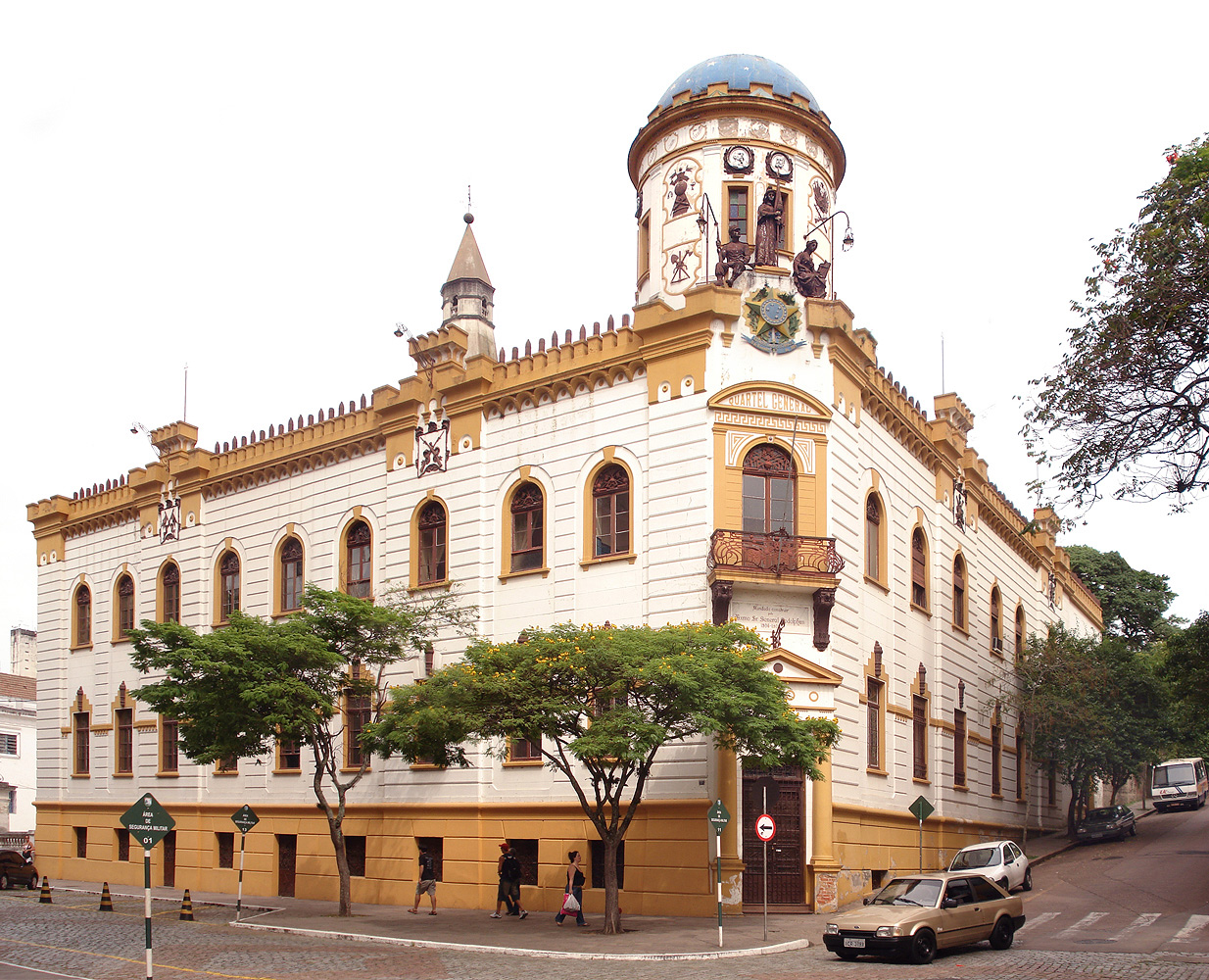
Former headquarters of the 3rd Military Region

The attack on the headquarters was personally directed by Oswaldo Aranha, Flores da Cunha, and the Civil Guard commander, Captain Agenor Barcelos Filho. The conspirators knew that the permanent guard at the Military Region headquarters—located at the corner of Andradas and General Canabarro streets—consisted of seven men, reinforced by another fifteen at night, all of whom were newly inducted recruits. Officers and enlisted men would leave for dinner starting at 17:00. At 17:30 on 3 October, the seven guards were on duty. There were machine guns in the turret and a small reserve of weaponry. The building was situated opposite the Civil Guard barracks and adjacent to the War Arsenal and the Regional Quartermaster Service. General Almeida resided at the headquarters with his wife and daughters.

The attackers had access to trenches surrounding the headquarters, which had been dug in advance by the Municipal Public Works Department under the pretext of repairing water pipes on Riachuelo and General Canabarro streets. According to General Almeida, several soldiers from the guard had been bribed to remove the firing pins from the machine guns and desert, taking ammunition with them. Machine guns surrounded the building, positioned at the corner of General Canabarro and Riachuelo streets, at the Hotel Majestic, on the terrace of the Military Brigade, and at the Church of Our Lady of Sorrows.

Every day, the Civil Guard would march in view of the Army sentries. Late in the afternoon on 3 October, fifty men performed this same routine maneuver, but shortly thereafter, at 17:25, a second group opened fire. The sentry at the door was struck down instantly. According to General Almeida's account, "more than 300 men were deployed in the attack and assault on the Headquarters, and they would have set it on fire had the resistance lasted any longer." Fifty men actually took part in the attack. Lines of Civil Guards, who had been feigning a wait for duty assignments, sprang into action upon hearing the gunfire, and were immediately reinforced by volunteers.

A fusillade erupted from all sides. Guards in defensive positions fired at the figures appearing in doorways and windows. One squad of guards stormed the main gate and killed an unarmed soldier. Another entered through the garage gate and the second courtyard. A soldier on cleaning duty rushed over with a broom; he was shot and then killed by bayonet thrusts. Major Otávio Cardoso, director of the Reserve Officers' Training Center, defended himself with his pistol but was killed by a shot to the back of the head as he stepped into the elevator car. The wounded were brought to the barracks courtyard.

In the ordnance room on the first floor, five military personnel put up a fight while surrounded. Lieutenant Miranda Correia went up to the turret to use the machine guns. The door was locked, and when he managed to force it open, he found the machine guns disabled. On the second floor, the only ones present were General Almeida and his family, along with Major João Cavalcanti Pereira, who was struck by a burst of machine-gun fire in his left shoulder as he approached the window. Their only weapons were revolvers. The fighting lasted about twenty minutes. Resistance was futile, and the officers and enlisted men surrendered. In addition to General Almeida, the prisoners included the regional Chief of Staff, Colonel Firmo Freire. According to General Almeida, "it is painful to confess that the defense was, from the very beginning, effectively nullified."

The War Arsenal and the Regional Quartermaster Service were located next to the headquarters. Major Elpídio Martins, who served in the Quartermaster Corps, attacked them with the Civil Guard, police forces, and civilians. The Arsenal was already defended, as the element of surprise had been lost. It was necessary to call in reinforcements from Flores da Cunha and force the gate to demand the defenders' surrender. At the Quartermaster facility, there was only a small contingent of civilians; little effort was required. Resistance at the War Arsenal ceased when the defenders learned of General Almeida's arrest.

=== Menino Deus Hill ===
Colonel Bordini, of the 9th Light Infantry Battalion (BC), commanded the force stationed on Menino Deus Hill. He professed loyalty to General Almeida but was secretly aligned with the conspirators. Lieutenant Colonel Esteves, of the 8th BC, was also a revolutionary, though his subordinates remained loyal to the government. He had previously even proposed taking command of the artillery, asking for the privilege of being the first to shell the government palace.

The attack was led by João Alberto Lins de Barros and the Brigade commander, Colonel Pereira. Participating forces included the 2nd Infantry Battalion and a company from the 1st Battalion—both belonging to the Military Brigade—as well as the Civil Guard. Captain Estillac Leal accompanied the 1st Battalion company; en route to Cemitério Hill, they exchanged brief fire with 9th BC patrols and occupied the Azenha–Treze de Maio–Botafogo line. Most opposing troops defected early on. This was the case with the 8th BC, which was neutralized by its own commander. The 9th BC's 2nd Company joined the Military Brigade's 2nd Battalion on Pacificação Street. Three other sub-units remained loyal to the government, mounting a weak counter-effort under Captain Argolo and Medical Lieutenant Luís de Alencastro. One hundred men from the Cavalry Squadron crossed this line of fire to join the revolutionaries of the 1st Battalion. The unit was subdued, and the remaining companies defected. Colonel Bordini was detained, yet within a few days, he had assumed a command position in the revolutionary army.

Once the artillery was neutralized, the attackers turned their attention to the Cavalry Squadron. Lieutenant Setembrino de Oliveira Palma led the assault, reinforced by cavalry cadets from the CPOR. The commander, Captain Jaime Ferrão, put up a fight and was killed. Lieutenant Pontes assumed command and attempted to continue the resistance. He discovered that the machine guns were inoperable: the firing pins had been removed. The squadron laid down its arms. The Mapping contingent was surrounded and surrendered. João Alberto neutralized the Ammunition Depot.

=== 2.ª Companhia de Estabelecimentos ===
This unit, commanded by Captain Inácio Corseill and based on Vieira de Castro Street, was besieged by the reserve force. At 18:00, the revolutionaries marched from Chácara das Bananeiras (Partenon) toward the Company's location. Combat began half an hour later, with the loyalists already in defensive positions outside the barracks. A company from the 1st Infantry Battalion came under fire near Jaime Teles Square but managed to advance. Another company moved up in support along Sans Souci Street (now Professor Freitas and Castro Street). The two companies, reinforced by a section from the Machine Gun Group, attacked the Company's barracks. Another company, from the 3rd Infantry Battalion, was positioned on Venâncio Aires Street and detached a platoon to join the attack.

After several hours of gunfire, Captain Estillac Leal sent an emissary with a letter outlining the situation and demanding surrender, terms which the loyalists negotiated at 20:30. Nearby, the Military College was attacked by the Military Brigade under the leadership of Alcides Etchegoyen and Colonel João de Deus Canabarro de Lucas. The occupation proceeded without difficulty.

=== 7th Light Infantry Battalion ===
The barracks at Praça do Portão

This unit was based in an old building at Praça do Portão and commanded by Colonel Benedito Marques da Silva Acauan, a brother-in-law of Flores da Cunha. Part of the troops were already committed to the conspiracy and abandoned the barracks through one of the side gates on Praça Argentina. Lieutenant Atos Correia Franco, who attempted to stop the escape, engaged in a physical struggle with the officers responsible for opening the gate—Lieutenants Ponçalino and Barreto Viana—and was killed by the latter's sword. The deserters reached the street, leaving behind in the barracks only a third of the unit's strength and fewer than two hundred men. Due to sabotage, only three automatic weapons remained functional.

Colonel Acauan remained loyal to the government and organized the resistance. The barracks came under attack from the Military Brigade, the Civil Guard, civilian revolutionaries, and the very comrades who had deserted. The attackers took up positions at locations including the Roco Confectionery, Rua da Misericórdia, Travessa Cruzeiro, and Rua 3 de Novembro. At 21:00, an order was given to bombard the site using artillery pieces brought down from Menino Deus Hill. Mortars set the roof on fire, and water and electricity supplies were cut off.

The firefight lasted until nearly midnight. The commander telephoned Vargas to request a truce. When the firing ceased, Lieutenant Olinto de França Almeida de Sá was sent into the city carrying a white flag to gather information. The revolutionaries escorted him to the Government Palace, from where he visited other sites where clashes had occurred. Realizing the Army had been defeated, he negotiated the surrender, as authorized by the commander.

== Surrender ==
At 22:00, General Almeida, detained at the headquarters, was personally called upon to surrender by Oswaldo Aranha. According to his account, Aranha "was reading radio messages and telegrams reporting victories, defections, and capitulations," showing the revolution triumphing in every state. "He took the opportunity to state that by that time—around 22:00 on 3 October—Dr. Washington Luís must have already been replaced in Rio de Janeiro by a military junta." This was a lie, and the conflict would drag on for several more weeks.

The general felt betrayed. He refused to surrender to Góis Monteiro, a former subordinate. He promised to turn himself in if Vargas wrote a letter assuming leadership of the revolution. They brought him a statement from the governor:

Porto Alegre, 3 October 1930.

To His Excellency General Gil de Almeida, Commander of the 3rd Military Region.

I have just learned of the occupation of the headquarters by revolutionary forces.

Given that this is a fully established situation—against which offering any resistance would be a futile sacrifice rather than an act of daring—I venture to appeal to Your Excellency to surrender to the forces of General Valdomiro de Lima (the bearer of this letter). He will, on my behalf, assure you of every guarantee befitting the dignity of your rank and the high regard in which you are held in Rio Grande do Sul.

I take this opportunity to reiterate the assurances of my high esteem.

(Signed) Getúlio Vargas.

The text was disingenuous: Vargas feigned surprise at the movement and attributed its leadership to Valdomiro de Lima, who was merely the letter's bearer. Upon receiving the letter, the general submitted to arrest and was taken to the ship Comandante Ripper, anchored in the Guaíba River. By 17 October, Comandante Ripper was already holding two generals, a senior Navy officer, 151 Army officers, and two officers from the Public Force of São Paulo.

At the 7th BC, Colonel Acauan signed the terms of surrender at dawn on the 4th. His surrender is notable for the observance of military courtesies and customs amidst the rebellion. Before the commander was arrested, a full change-of-command ceremony took place, complete with speeches. Góis Monteiro signed in the capacity of "Chief of Staff to President Getúlio Vargas." The document justified the action by noting that "the 7th BC, having put up tenacious resistance against the superior forces that had completely isolated it, now finds itself in a position where prolonging the fight would result only in the useless sacrifice of lives." The legalists were to hand over the barracks and equipment to the government of Rio Grande do Sul. Each serviceman in the unit was given the choice to join the revolution or face arrest, with the guarantee—in the latter case—that both his dignity and that of his family would be respected. Ultimately, all the soldiers chose to join the revolt.

== Outcome ==
Vargas leaves for the front line

According to Hélio Silva, "Porto Alegre truly experienced the revolution between 17:30 and 22:00." The fighting cost at least 19 lives, according to some sources, or 22—including three Army officers, with the remainder being civilians and enlisted personnel from the Army, the Military Brigade, and the Civil Guard. The Army officers were Otávio Cardoso, Jaime Ferrão, and Atos Correia Franco; General Almeida's memoirs name a fourth, Lieutenant Joaquim Gonçalves de Melo. Estimates of the wounded ranged from ninety to one hundred. In the attack on the Military Region Headquarters alone, the revolutionaries suffered eleven dead and fourteen wounded.

On 4 October, the press celebrated the revolutionaries' triumph. News of Army uprisings arrived from the rest of the country, and while a few loyalists in other Rio Grande do Sul garrisons held out longer, the state was brought under control within three days. In the words of General Almeida, "the Army in Rio Grande do Sul abandoned its defense." Aranha notified the President of Brazil of the revolution's start via radiogram, calling upon him to resign. Vargas explained his position in a manifesto to the nation. Another manifesto, published that same day, bore the signatures of intellectuals, artists, journalists, professors, and politicians from Rio Grande do Sul.

The federal government resisted. The military campaign continued throughout October, and for a time, loyalist forces in São Paulo—entrenched at Itararé—seemed unbeatable. Police in Rio Grande do Sul hunted down rumor-mongers, partisans of Firmino Paim, and other enemies of the revolution, just as their counterparts in Rio de Janeiro arrested revolutionary sympathizers. Rumors circulated regarding secret negotiations with the federal government, brokered by General Almeida. However, there was no genuine interest in a ceasefire. The revolutionaries were in a hurry, as they lacked the ammunition for a protracted campaign. Enthusiasm ran high: volunteers enlisted, and groups of young women raised funds for the families of impoverished fighters.

On 11 October, Vargas handed over the state government to Oswaldo Aranha, bypassing his deputy and legal successor, João Neves da Fontoura, to assume command of the revolutionary troops. At 11:45, he left the Piratini Palace for the railway station. Along the way, crowds hailed him as president, waving red handkerchiefs—the symbols of the revolution. Although not a military man, Vargas allowed himself to be photographed in uniform, embodying the leadership of the revolution. In Rio de Janeiro, on 24 October, Washington Luís was deposed by a military junta that transferred the presidency to Vargas, thereby concluding the revolution.
