= Palace of the Public Ministry =

Brazilian historic building

Palace of the Public Ministry of the State of Rio Grande do Sul
- Palácio do Ministério Público do Estado do Rio Grande do Sul
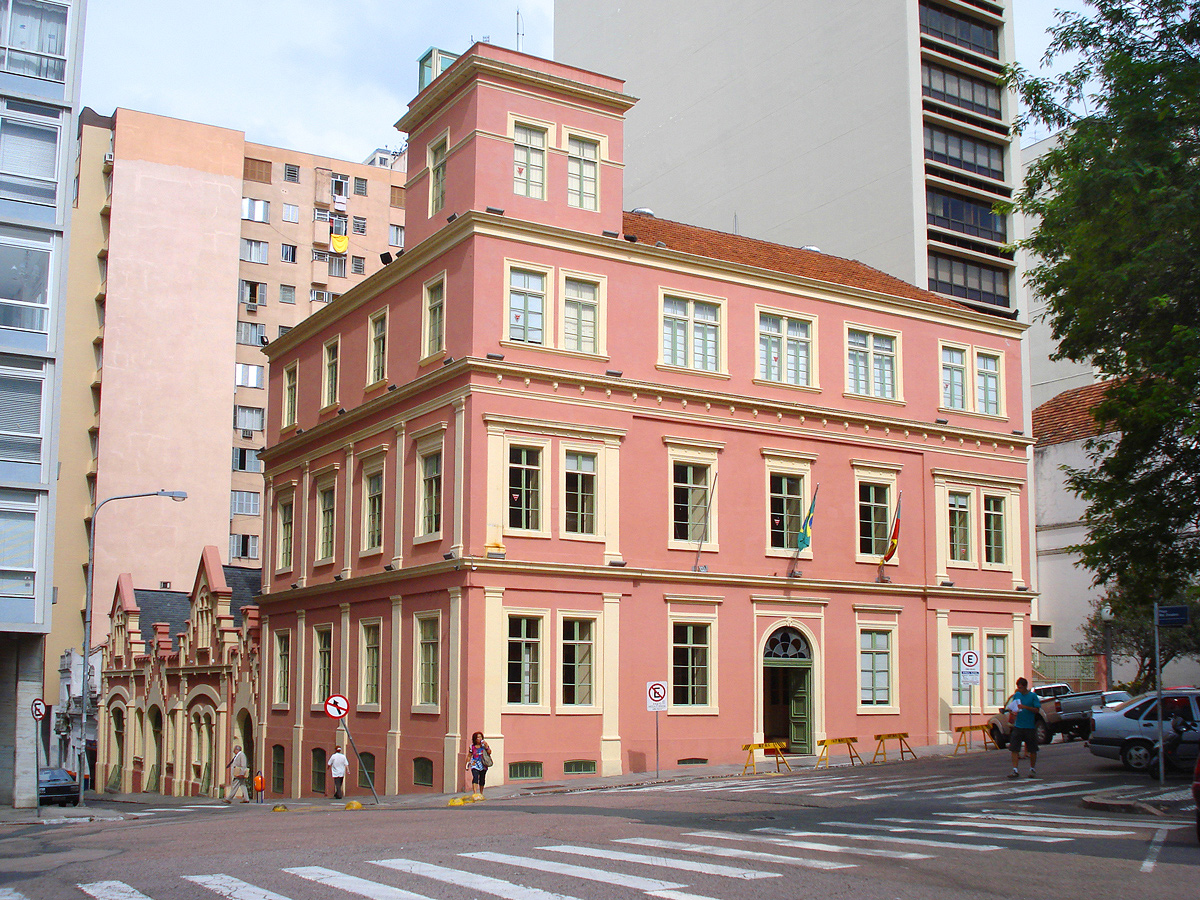
- Location: Porto Alegre, Rio Grande do Sul; Brazil
- Coordinates: 30°1′57.324″S 51°13′46.006″W
- Type: Museum, palace, historic building

The Palace of the Public Ministry of the State of Rio Grande do Sul (Portuguese: Palácio do Ministério Público do Estado do Rio Grande do Sul), or simply Palace of the Public Ministry, also known as Fort Apache (Portuguese: Forte Apache), is a historic building in Porto Alegre, the capital of Rio Grande do Sul. It is located in the Mother Church Square and integrates a complex of buildings of great architectural and historical significance. Due to its multiple uses and design over time, this building received many names, such as Provincial Assembly Building, Provisional Palace, Public Offices Building, and Public Works Building.

== History ==
Initially, the site was occupied by a building designed to house the Provincial Assembly. The construction work began in 1857, at the behest of Commander Patrício Correia da Câmara, first Viscount of Pelotas and vice-president of the Province of São Pedro do Rio Grande do Sul, acting as president. The project conceived by engineer Francisco Nunes de Miranda included a basement, two floors and two turrets, as well as modern structural solutions for the time, such as the roof slab with a system of double "T" steel profiles combined with compression bricks, forming small arches. Later, the design was modified by engineer Antônio Mascarenhas Telles de Freitas, and the works were under the responsibility of engineer Domingos Francisco dos Santos.

The construction work was completed in 1871, but the assembly was not installed there, and the building was occupied by the general directorate of Provincial Treasury Business, the Arms Command of the Province of São Pedro, the Telegraph Office, and the directorate of Public Works. On July 1, 1892, Affonso Hebert, director of Public Works, Land and Colonization, installed, in the north tower, the first Meteorological Observatory of the state. In 1894, the south wing was built to accommodate the expansion of the government agencies it housed.

In February 1896, the directorate of Public Works moved out and the building was remodeled again, accommodating, on the first floor, the Secretariat of the Interior, and on the upper floor, the official residence of the State Presidency, then occupied by Júlio de Castilhos. As in this same year the old Government Palace was demolished and the cornerstone for the future Piratini Palace, which would be the seat of state government until today, was laid, the old Assembly Palace became known as the Provisional Palace. In 1899, it was again expanded. In this renovation, the building received an additional floor, the gap between the two towers on the border corners (which earned it the nickname Fort Apache) was closed, and a new single tower was installed over the north corner; this is the configuration that endures to this day.

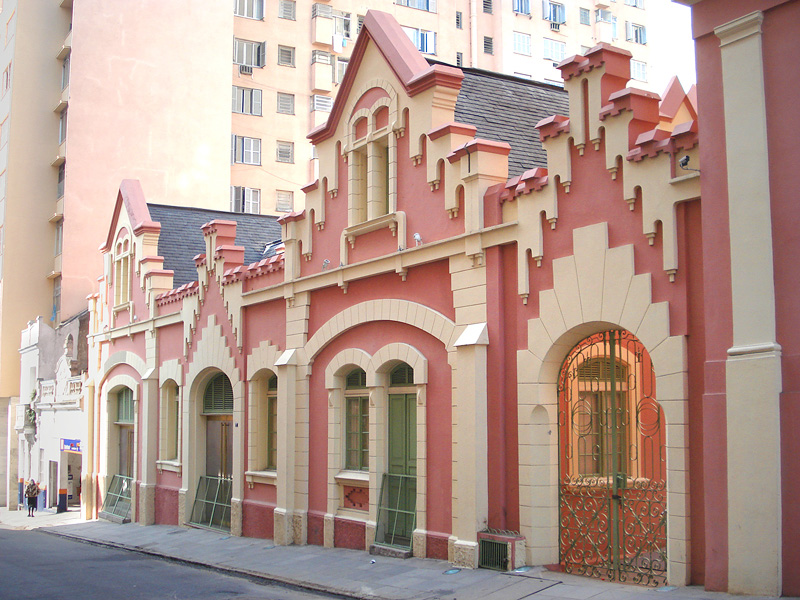
Old Stables.

In 1921, the seat of government moved definitively to the Piratini Palace, leaving the building for the use of the Hygiene and Health Directorate of the Health Secretariat, which remained there until 1963. At that time, its demolition was even decided, but the building was handed over to the Judiciary, which installed several organs in it. The palace was declared a state heritage site by IPHAE in 1982, and was returned to the State Executive Branch, which transferred the right to use it to the Public Ministry, responsible for restoring it between 2000 and 2002. When it was reopened, it was renamed Palace of the Public Ministry.

== The Memorial of the Public Ministry ==
During the restoration work, the building was adapted to house the Public Ministry's Memorial and the Attorney General's office.

The memorial promotes seminars on the history and perspectives of the Public Ministry in Rio Grande do Sul and in Brazil, and develops projects with the community, reinforcing and clarifying the mechanisms available for the exercise of citizenship.

Part of the history of the institution is preserved in the Oral History Bank, which started its activities on August 30, 2000, and in 2007 had about 100 depositions. The group of interviewers includes members of the institution, people from Rio Grande do Sul and from other states, judges, civil servants, wives of prosecutors, politicians, etc. Some of the statements have already been published, in full, in volumes 1, 2 and 3 of the series Histórias de Vida do Ministério Público (English: Life Stories from the Public Ministry). Another part of its history is preserved as a documentary, photographic and multimedia collection.

== See also ==
- History of Porto Alegre
- History of Rio Grande do Sul
- Architecture of Porto Alegre
