= Chalé da Praça XV =

Historic restaurant in Porto Alegre

Coordinates: 30°1′42″S 51°13′39″W

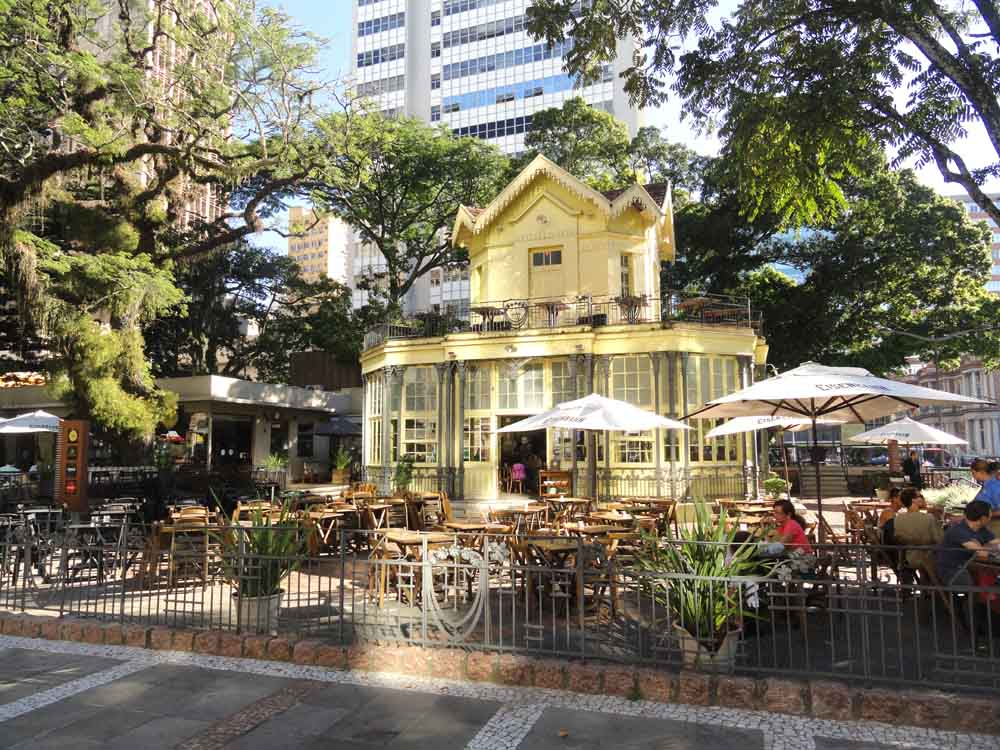
- View from the entrance of the Chalé da Praça XV in 2013.
- Interactive map of the Chalé da Praça XV area

General information
- Architectural style: Eclecticism
- Location: Porto Alegre, Rio Grande do Sul, Brazil
- Inaugurated: November 22, 1885

Website
- https://www.chaledapracaxv.com.br/

Chalé da Praça XV is one of Porto Alegre's most traditional bars and restaurants. It is located in the city's historic center, XV de Novembro Square, near the Public Market and Town Hall.

== History ==
The first Chalet opened on November 22, 1885, as an ice cream kiosk. It was renovated in 1909 and 1911, and again in 1971 after a fire. It was listed as part of the Municipal Historical Patrimony while retaining its function as a restaurant. In 1999, along with the restoration of the square, the building was refurbished, and a Senac school restaurant specializing in gaucho cuisine was installed.

On January 11, 2011, the chalet and its square were reopened by the City Hall after its structure was restored and expanded with an annex building in contemporary style, for R$ 1.5 million. The chalet has a long tradition in Porto Alegre and remains a popular meeting and leisure spot in the city center.

== Features ==
Built with removable steel, wood, and glass elements, its design follows a radiocentric layout. The style is eclectic, reflecting a preference for the picturesque character of the period in which it was constructed. However, there are distinctly Art Nouveau elements in the decoration, particularly in the metal railing that surrounds the outdoor area and encloses the terrace. The metal pillars and decorations, along with the modular wood and glass panels that make up the façade, bear witness to the technological innovations that occurred at the turn of the 20th century and influenced architectural styles.

The small building has two octagonal floors, as well as a basement and mezzanine, totaling 195.23 m² of floor space. The first floor consists of the restaurant's main hall, an adjoining kitchen and support room, and a small mezzanine. The floor features hydraulic tiles with geometric motifs. The upper floor, accessible via a movable metal staircase, contains a smaller room, also octagonal, with a roof decorated with lambrequins and surrounded by a terrace with railings serving as a parapet.

== See also ==
- History of Porto Alegre
- Architecture of Porto Alegre
