= Praça da Matriz =

Historic square in Southern Brazil

- Praça Deodoro da Fonseca
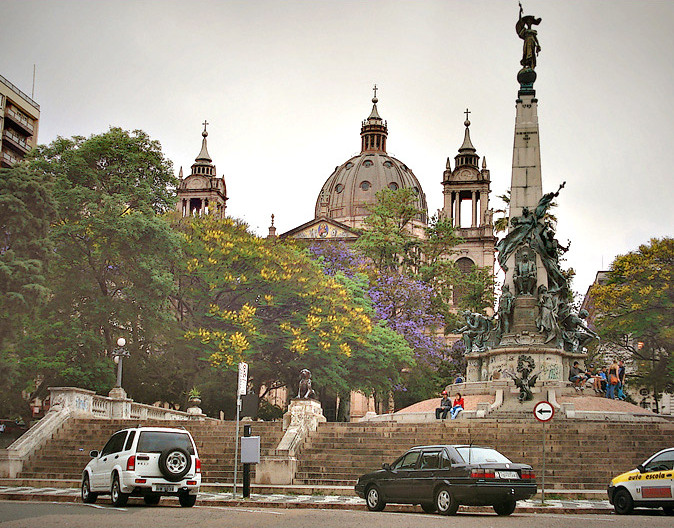
- Praça da Matriz in 2007.
- Location: Porto Alegre, Rio Grande do Sul, Brazil
- Coordinates: 30.0329°S 51.2302°W
- Type: Historic square (heritage site)

Praça Marechal Deodoro, better known as Praça da Matriz (in English: "Matriz Square"), is a historic square in the city of Porto Alegre, the capital of the Brazilian state of Rio Grande do Sul. It is located in the heart of the city, in the Historic Center, and has existed since the early days of the capital. It is listed by the National Institute of Historic and Artistic Heritage.

== History ==
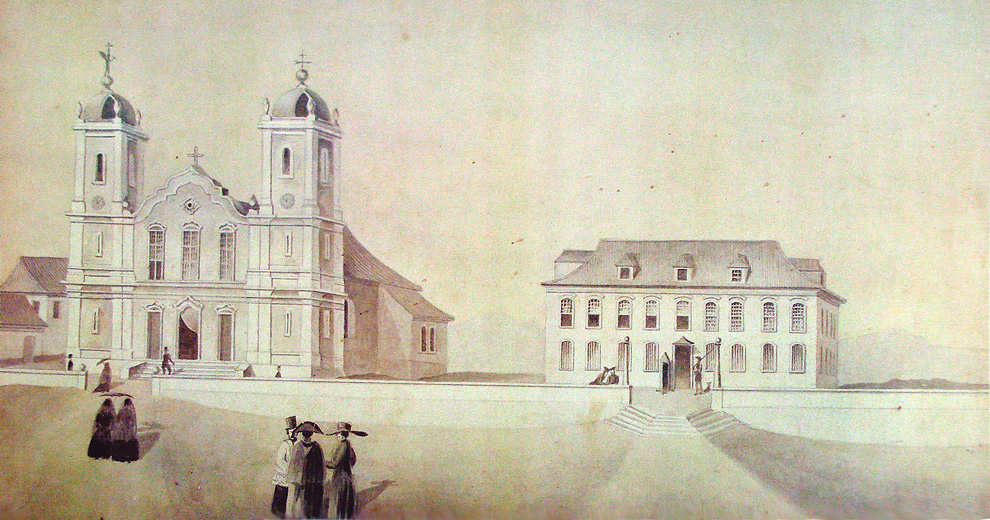
View of the square around 1850 with its two first buildings: the Mother Church and the Government Palace

The first mention of the square dates back to 1753, when a cemetery was built there. Its southern side was the first to be occupied, and the Igreja Matriz ("Mother Church") was built. As a result, its name became Praça da Matriz ("Matriz Square"). A short time later, in 1772, it appeared on the first map of the small settlement that was Porto Alegre in its early days, as Praça do Novo Lugar ("New Place Square"). When the capital of the captaincy was transferred from Viamão to Porto Alegre, the square was chosen to house the Governor's Palace, completed in 1789, and became known as Praça do Palácio da Presidência ("Governor's Palace Square"). Next to the Palace, the Casa da Junta, was erected in 1790, and between 1837 and 1839, next to the Mother Church, the first Capela do Divino Espírito Santo ("Chapel of the Divine Holy Spirit").

Establishing itself slowly, the square was nothing more than an eroded elevation until 1840. In that decade, the first sidewalks were built, and in the second half of the 19th century, after the turmoil caused by the Ragamuffin War, when the city was besieged for ten years, other important buildings were constructed in its surroundings, such as the Palace of the Public Ministry, the headquarters of the Bailante Society, the first headquarters of the municipal government, the São Pedro Theater and its twin building (the headquarters of the Palace of Justice later destroyed in a fire), and the Junta Criminal ("Criminal Board").

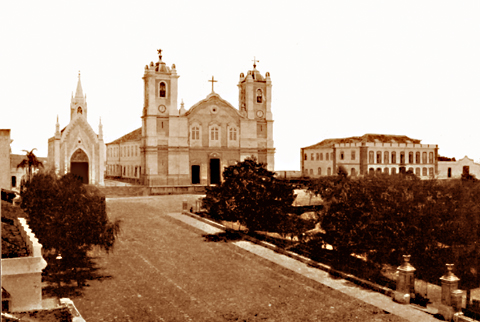
Virgilio Calegari: View of the square in its first renovation process, in 1890

In 1858, its name was changed to Pedro II Square, due to the Emperor's visit to the provincial capital. Soon after, the Emperor's Fountain was installed with marble statues, which symbolized the rivers of the Guaíba Basin. The fountain was transferred to the Hidráulica Moinhos de Vento in 2014.

Although there was an intention to improve landscaping, a photograph taken after 1870 shows only a few palm trees. Landscaping was in fact undertaken between 1881 and 1883, including even 20 olive trees from Portugal. In 1885, the square received the Monument to the Count of Porto Alegre, later moved to the square that bears his name, the Praça Conde de Porto Alegre. On December 11, 1889, a municipal decree changed the location's name to Praça Marechal Deodoro, which it retains to this day. In 1896, the former Government Palace was demolished to make way for a larger and more luxurious headquarter, the current Palácio Piratini.

On October 24, 1914, the Júlio de Castilhos Monument was inaugurated, in honor of the statesman Júlio de Castilhos. The bronze monument, built during the administration of Governor Carlos Barbosa, was created by sculptor Décio Villares. The central figure of the governor is surrounded by personifications of virtues, such as Courage and Prudence, and of values and institutions, such as Education and Civism. Like many buildings in Porto Alegre, the monument suffered from depredation over time. Shortly thereafter, the old Mother Church was demolished for the construction of a larger cathedral, the present Metropolitan Cathedral of Porto Alegre.

Later, the square received major improvements. In 1927, where the old Legislative Assembly building was located, the first Araújo Viana Auditorium was built for concerts of the municipal band but was demolished in the 1960s to erect the modern Farroupilha ("Ragamuffin") Palace, the seat of the State's Legislative. Near the Praça da Matriz, there are other historic buildings such as the Solar dos Câmara ("Câmara's Manor House"), the Júlio de Castilhos Museum, and the State Public Library.

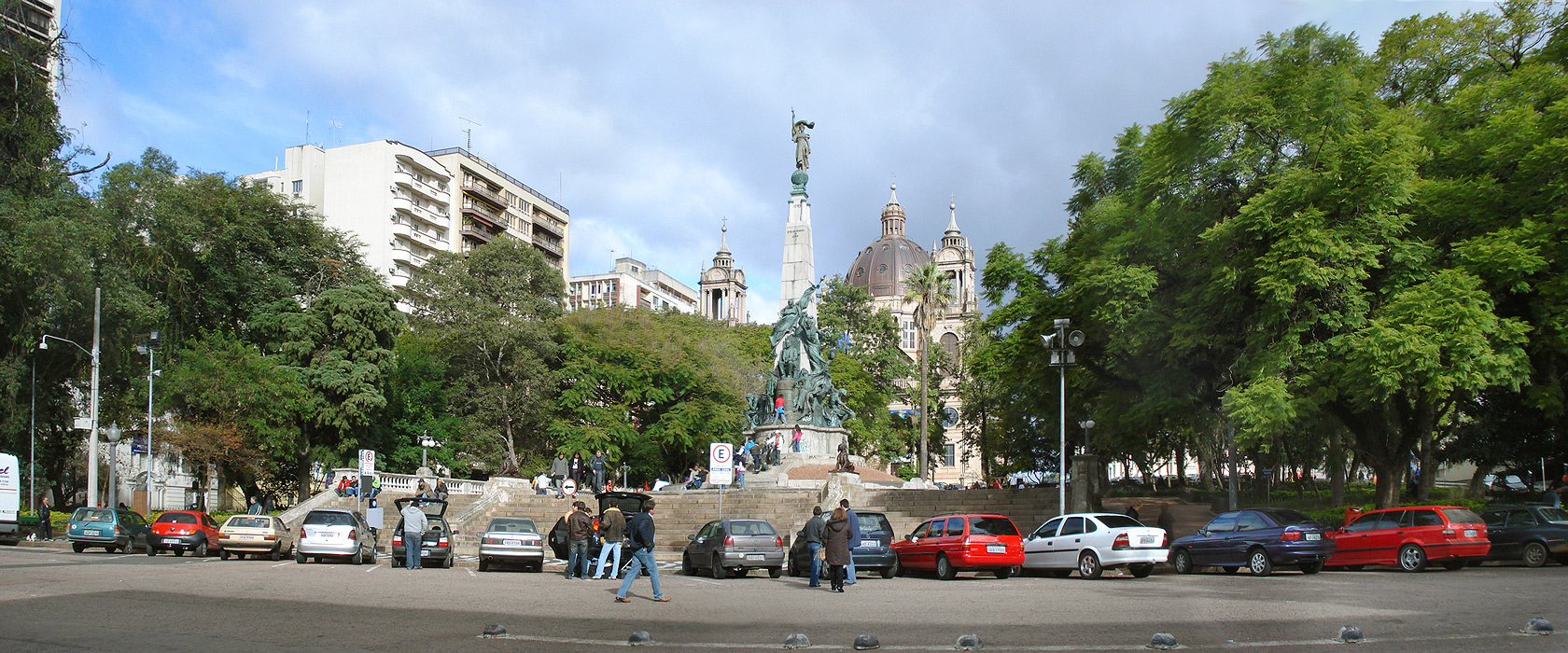
Current view of the Matriz Square, with the Monument to Júlio de Castilhos in the center and the cathedral in the background

== See also ==
- History of Porto Alegre
- History of Rio Grande do Sul

== Bibliography ==
- Machado, Andréa Soler (2000). "A Praça da Matriz". Revista ArqTexto (1). Departamento de Arquitetura / PROPAR-UFRGS.
