= Herrmann Rudolf Wendroth =

German mercenary and painter

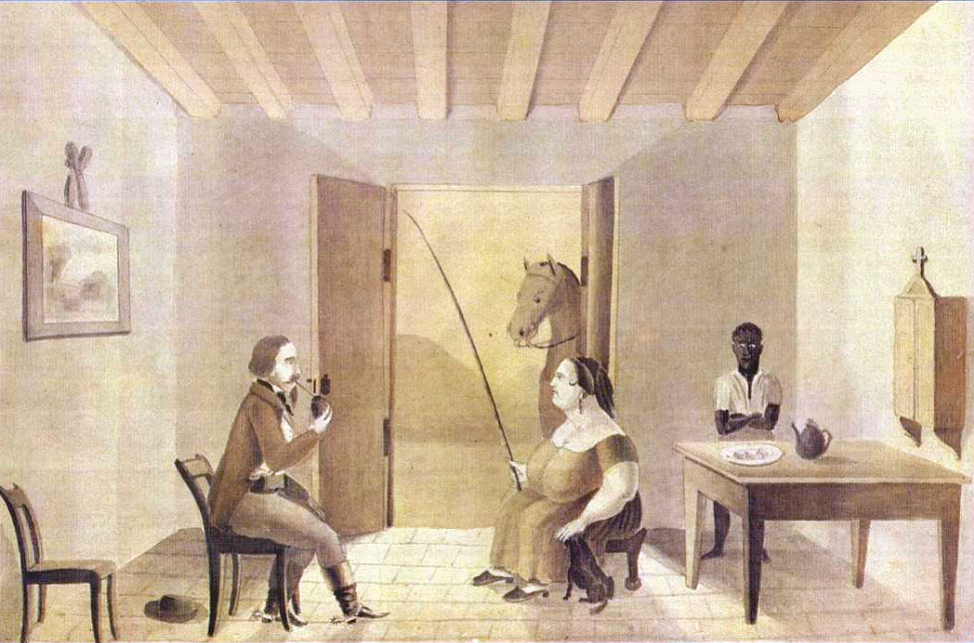
Aventura com uma brasileira ("Adventure with a Brazilian Woman"), Wendroth's self-portrait in a woman's house.

Herrmann Rudolf Wendroth was a German mercenary and amateur artist who went to Brazil in 1851 and left important visual documentation about the province of Rio Grande do Sul.

== Life ==
Very little is known about his life. He was born in Mainz, and in 1851 was hired by the Brazilian government to fight in the Platine War. He arrived in Rio de Janeiro on the ship Hamburg and was incorporated into the German Legion that served in the south, whose members were known by the nickname brummers (the "grumblers"). Due to military urgencies, his transfer to Rio Grande do Sul was immediate, arriving around August 8 in Rio Grande, where he met Karl von Koseritz and was arrested for drunkenness, soon leaving to Pelotas, where he was arrested again for rioting.

Because of his lack of discipline, he did not go with his troops to the Uruguayan front. Still, from his illustrations, he likely followed part of the German Legion's itinerary as far as Porto Alegre and Rio Pardo. By September 20, 1851, he had already disbanded from the Legion, moving on to a life as a wandering adventurer. A while after he was in Lavras do Sul, where he lingered exploring for gold in the region's mines. There he prepared a memorial on the geology and mineralogy of the land, which he forwarded to the president of the province.

Wendroth went on a journey through various parts of the countryside, experiencing a series of adventures and difficulties. Since his arrival, he showed through sketches, watercolors, and drawings the local populations, the urban landscapes, and the natural environment with its characteristic scenery, plants, and animals. He produced the most important set of visual documentation of the province in the mid-19th century and died at an unknown date and place.

== Works ==
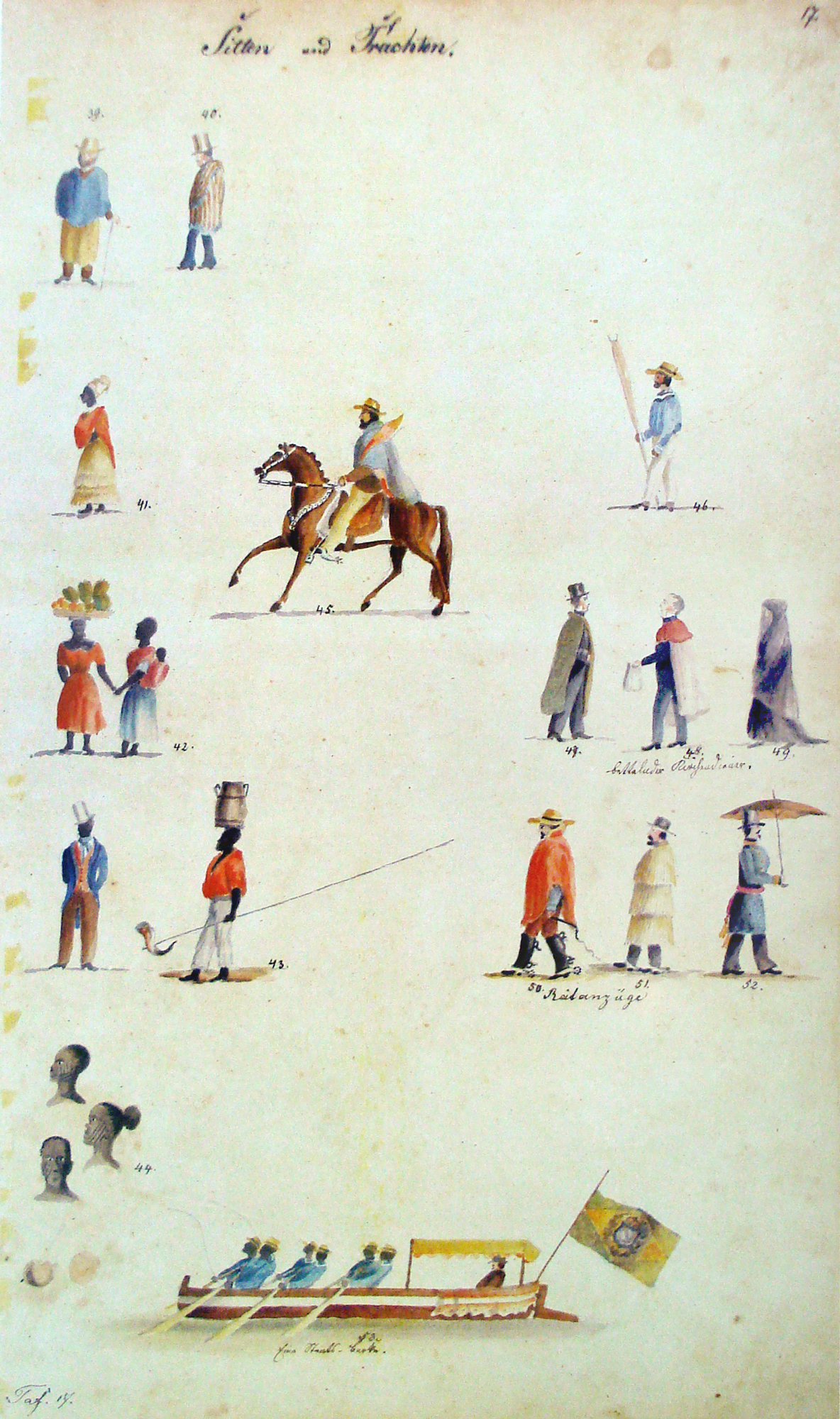
Typical people of the province.

Herrmann had gone to Brazil in the hope of making a fortune, and it was in this sense that the collection of images was likely produced, as he intended to publish them for sale when he returned to Europe (it was fashionable at that time to publish albums and prints publicizing exotic, picturesque and distant places). This, however, did not happen: His works ended up in Argentina and in 1857 were in the possession of F. A. Buhlmann. He sent them in 1863 from Buenos Aires to Emperor Pedro II along with a letter in which he posed as the author, asking the Emperor to buy them at the price that suited him best and said that they were originally intended to be published in Germany but the idea could not be realized for lack of resources. It is possible that Wendroth died in Buenos Aires around these years.

The works were effectively acquired by the Brazilian imperial family, remaining inaccessible for many years. In 1939, the Inventário de Documentos da Casa Imperial do Brasil ("Inventory of Documents of the Imperial Household of Brazil") published by the National Library acknowledged the existence, in the Château d'Eu, of a bound album of watercolors mistakenly cataloged as being by Carlos Emil Buhlmann. The work was inherited by Prince Pedro Gastão de Orléans e Bragança, who settled in Brazil after World War II. In 1963, his secretary Guilherme Auler, while working on documentation related to Princess Isabel, found Buhlmann's letter and the album and notified Augusto Meyer, who was delighted with the material and called a commission to study it and arrange for its publication. In this process, it was verified, with the help of the Criminalistics Institute of Rio de Janeiro, that Wendroth's signature had been erased and Buhlmann placed his on top, thus establishing the true authorship of the images. General Bertoldo Klinger took charge of the cataloging, also performing the translation of the captions of the images and some short texts and poems attached.

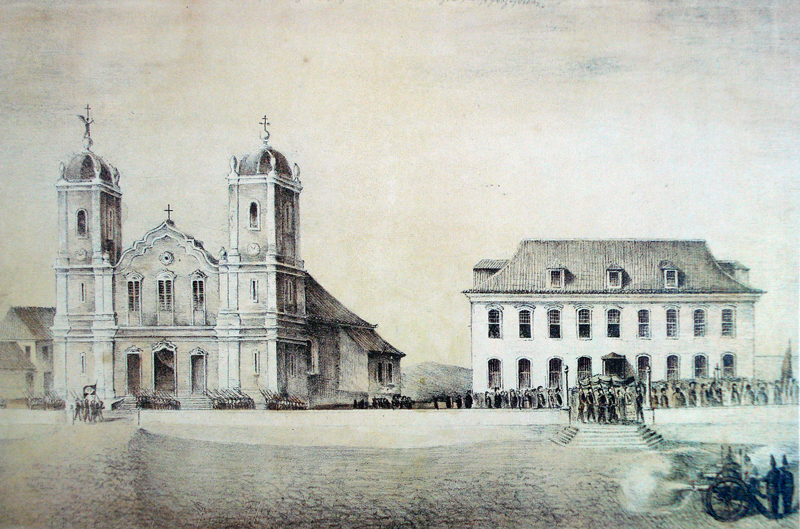
The Mother Church and Government Palace in Porto Alegre

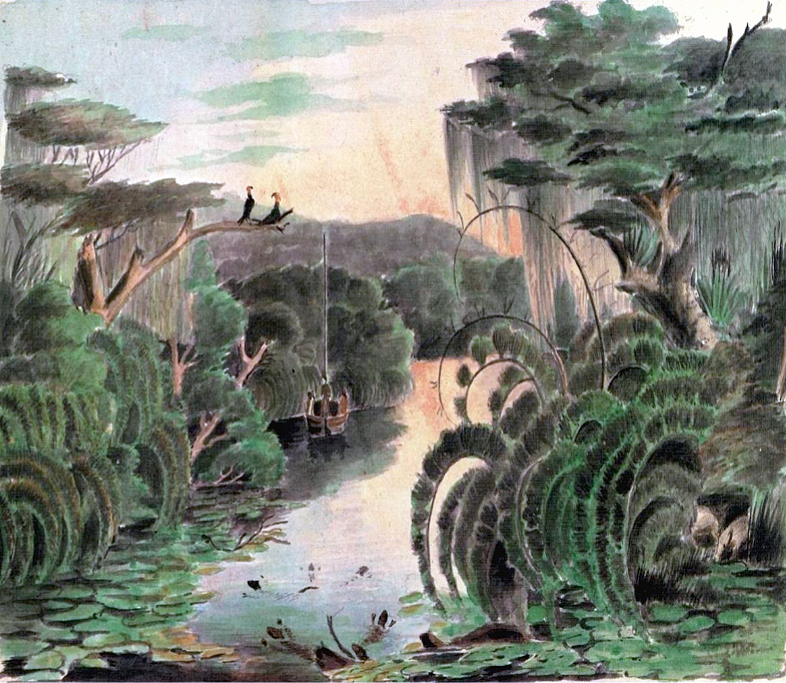
Virgin forest

The publication, however, did not take place. In 1971, in an article in Revista Brasileira de Cultura, Hélio Vianna stated that Prince D. Pedro Gastão had lent the collection to Jaime Bastian Pinto to organize the publication, which also did not materialize. Finally, in 1982 the Riocell company made a partial publication with a presentation by Abeillard Barreto, produced as a year-end gift to its employees, and the following year the state government published the complete collection in the album O Rio Grande do Sul em 1852: aquarelas por Herrmann Rudolf Wendroth. The issue was released to the public on March 8, 1983, along with an exhibition of the originals, being the event that inaugurated the Casa de Cultura Mario Quintana. Since then, Wendroth's images have had a wide circulation, appearing in books, articles, and websites.

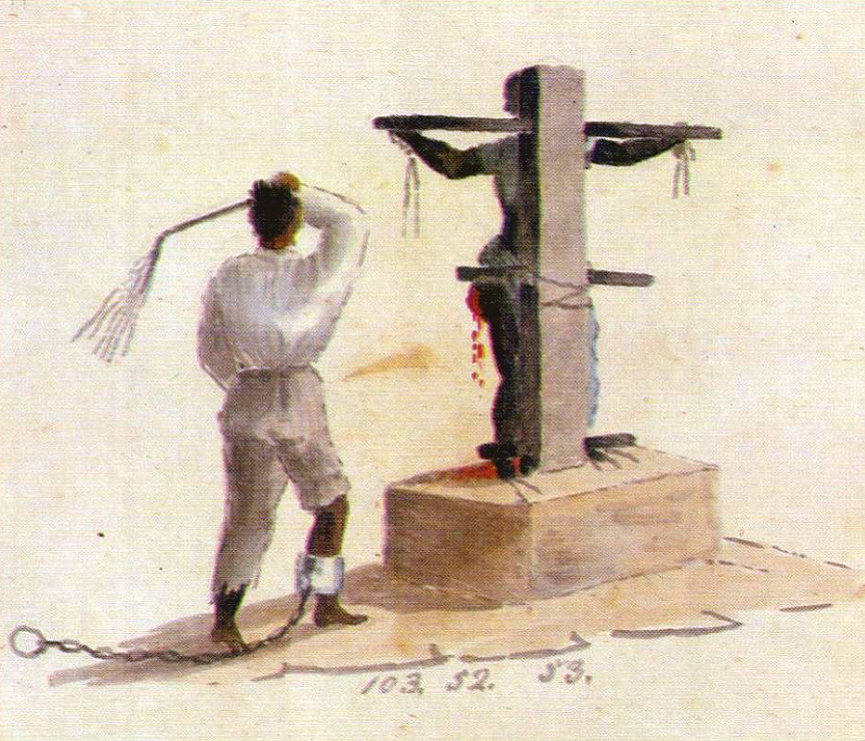
Black in the pelourinho (a pillar erected in a public place, where criminals were exposed and punished).

In 2020, an issue was published by the University of Lisbon's Center for Lusophone Literatures and Cultures in cooperation with the Rio-Grandense Library, with a text by Francisco das Neves Alves and Luiz Henrique Torres. For the authors:

"Wendroth's work brought a fundamental constitutive element for a better understanding of the Rio Grande do Sul past - the image. [...] Just as nature and human constructions were part of Wendroth's work, the various facets of the social formation of the south were also present, showing the diverse human types that made up that society."

Examples are the gauchos, estancieros, tropeiros, and travelers, soldiers, indigenous people, slaves, and the varied urban population. In Maria Angélica Zubaran's opinion, it is "an iconographic collection of rare cultural and documentary value on the natural and urban landscape and the uses and customs of the population of the state in the 19th century, and especially because it constitutes one of the rare visual records of Rio Grande do Sul in the second half of the 19th century." For Júlio Bittencourt Francisco, it is "the vastest visual record of Rio Grande do Sul in the 19th century."

His illustrations often reveal a satirical and jocular vein that is close to caricature, but did not fail to portray conflicting aspects of society, such as the gap between social classes, showing the different costumes, housing, and customs of the elite and the common people, and slavery, showing the blacks in their heavy work and the punishment they received. He also showed infrastructural problems of the province, such as the bad conditions of the port of Rio Grande and the precariousness of the means of transport and roads. In many images, the author becomes the protagonist of the scenes, illustrating the situations he went through, such as the time in jail, the hunting, the drinking, the incursions into the bush, a discussion with a priest, the activity as a prospector, the amorous gallantries. For Luciana da Costa Oliveira,

"The work of the artist-soldier has several nuances. When it is autobiographical, he often uses a more satirical and comic tone, and when he turns to landscapes, a watercolorist more concerned with detail and colors stand out. However, when his production turns to human types or scenes that, possibly, were different to him and that, for sure, caused him strangeness, the descriptive and, sometimes, classificatory aspect seems to be the predominant one. [...] Inserted in the context of nineteenth-century travels, he, like the other men who crossed the Atlantic in search of new species and stories, also behaved as a documentary artist because, like some of his contemporaries, he was a meticulous analyst and observer of particularities of the world."

== See also ==
- History of Rio Grande do Sul

== Bibliography ==
- Alves, Francisco das Neves; Torres, Luiz Henrique (2020). Imagens do Brasil Meridional: as aquarelas de Hermann Rudolf Wendroth (in Portuguese). Centro de Literaturas e Culturas Lusófonas da Universidade de Lisboa / Biblioteca Rio-Grandense. pp. 14–18.
