= Casa da Junta =

18th-century building in Porto Alegre, Brazil

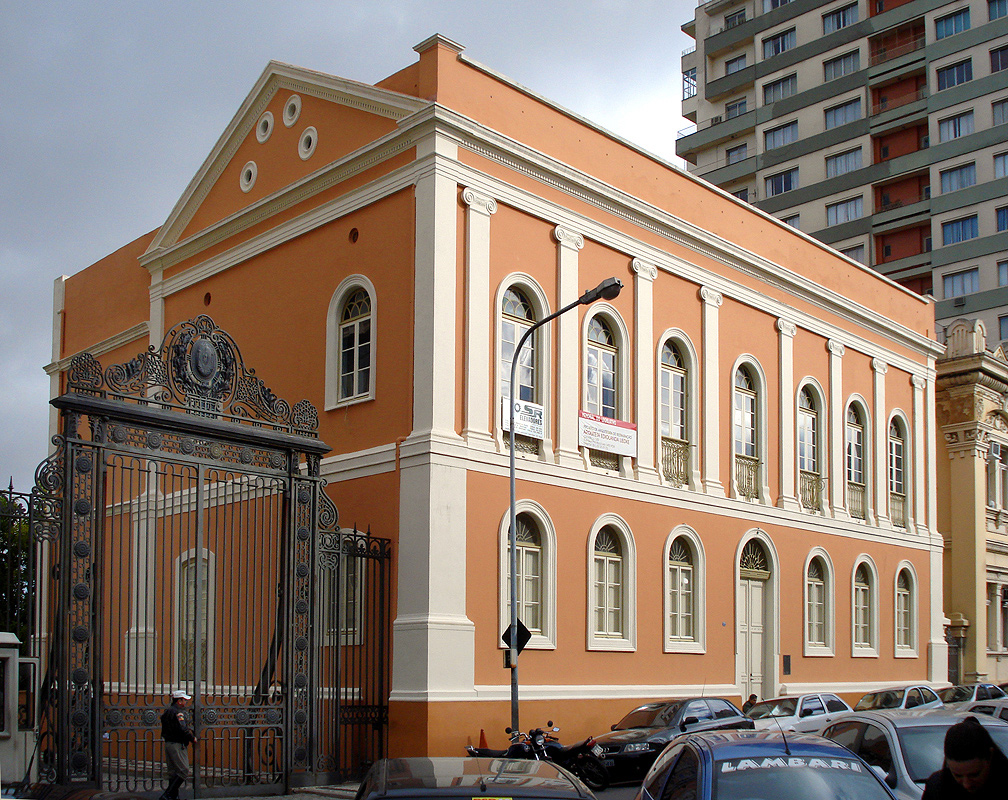

General information
- Location: Porto Alegre, Brazil
- Coordinates: 30°2′0.636″S 51°13′52.367″W

Design and construction
- Architect(s): Alexandre José Montanha
- Awards and prizes: Heritage site listed by IPHAE

The Casa da Junta ("House of the Council"), also known as the Old Legislative Assembly, is a historic building in the Brazilian city of Porto Alegre, the capital of the state of Rio Grande do Sul, located at 1029 Duque de Caxias Street, at the historic center. It is likely the only building in Porto Alegre dating back to the 18th century.

It currently houses the Memorial to the Legislative of Rio Grande do Sul, under the administration of the Legislative Assembly.

== History ==
It was built in 1790, being the oldest remnant from the time of the city's foundation. It was designed by Captain José Montanha, during the administration of José Marcelino de Figueiredo, and was conceived as a set with the old government palace, on the left, which was demolished to make way for the current Piratini Palace.

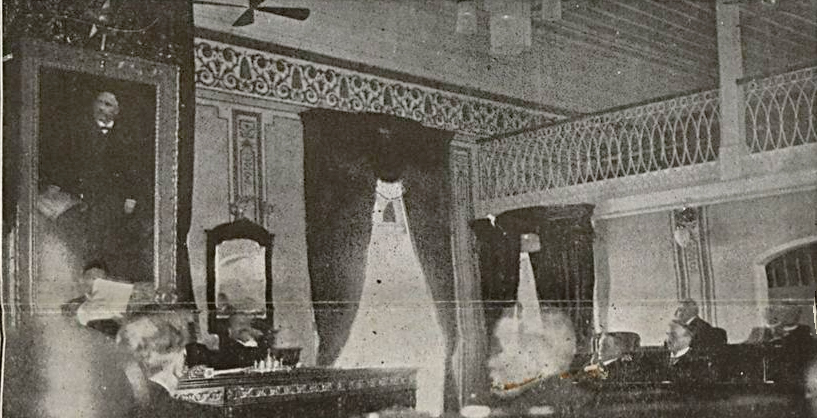
Opening of the 1919 legislative year with the reading of a message from state president Borges de Medeiros.

The Provedoria da Real Fazenda ("Ombudsman of the Royal Treasury") or the Junta de Administração e Arrecadação da Fazenda ("Board of Administration and Collection of the Treasury") was installed there, functioning as the Casa da Junta ("House of the Council"), Chamber, and Jail. In 1828, it became home to the Province's General Council, and from 1835 the Legislative Assembly kept its headquarters there. However, in the same year, the Ragamuffin War started, when the Legislative went into recess, being reactivated in 1845. Initially built with only one floor, it was remodeled and expanded in 1860, when its old colonial aspect was changed with neoclassical elements. It closed again between 1865 and 1870, during the Paraguayan War. Between 1937 and 1947, during the Vargas Era, it remained closed once more due to the dissolution of the legislatures, being renovated in 1947 to receive the new deputies of the third state Constituent Assembly. It continued to host the Assembly until 1967, when the new collegiate building, the Farroupilha ("Ragamuffin") Palace, was inaugurated.

In 1977, the building was included by the City Hall in the Inventory of Real Estate Properties of Historic and Cultural Value and of Expressive Tradition, being listed in 1981 by the State Historical Heritage. In 1982, it was restored and began to house the Civil House. In 2004, its ownership returned to the Legislative Assembly, currently functioning as the headquarters of the Legislative Memorial.

== The building ==
Its design is simple but harmoniously proportioned, with a central round-arched doorway between two groups of three arched windows. On the upper floor, the openings are doors, all with grilled parapets of worked metal, and are separated by delicate Ionic pilasters. The lower and upper openings feature occluded tympanums with stained glass windows without images. The mansion's façade is finished off by a basic cornice with a smooth parapet. On the sides, the gabled roof gives rise to a beautiful triangular pediment with four small oculi. Below, two round-arched windows, and on the first floor, two more, but with depressed arches, are the only vestiges of its original colonial design.

== See also ==
- Legislative Assembly of Rio Grande do Sul
- History of Porto Alegre
- Architecture of Porto Alegre
