= Porto Alegre Public Market =

- Mercado Público de Porto Alegre
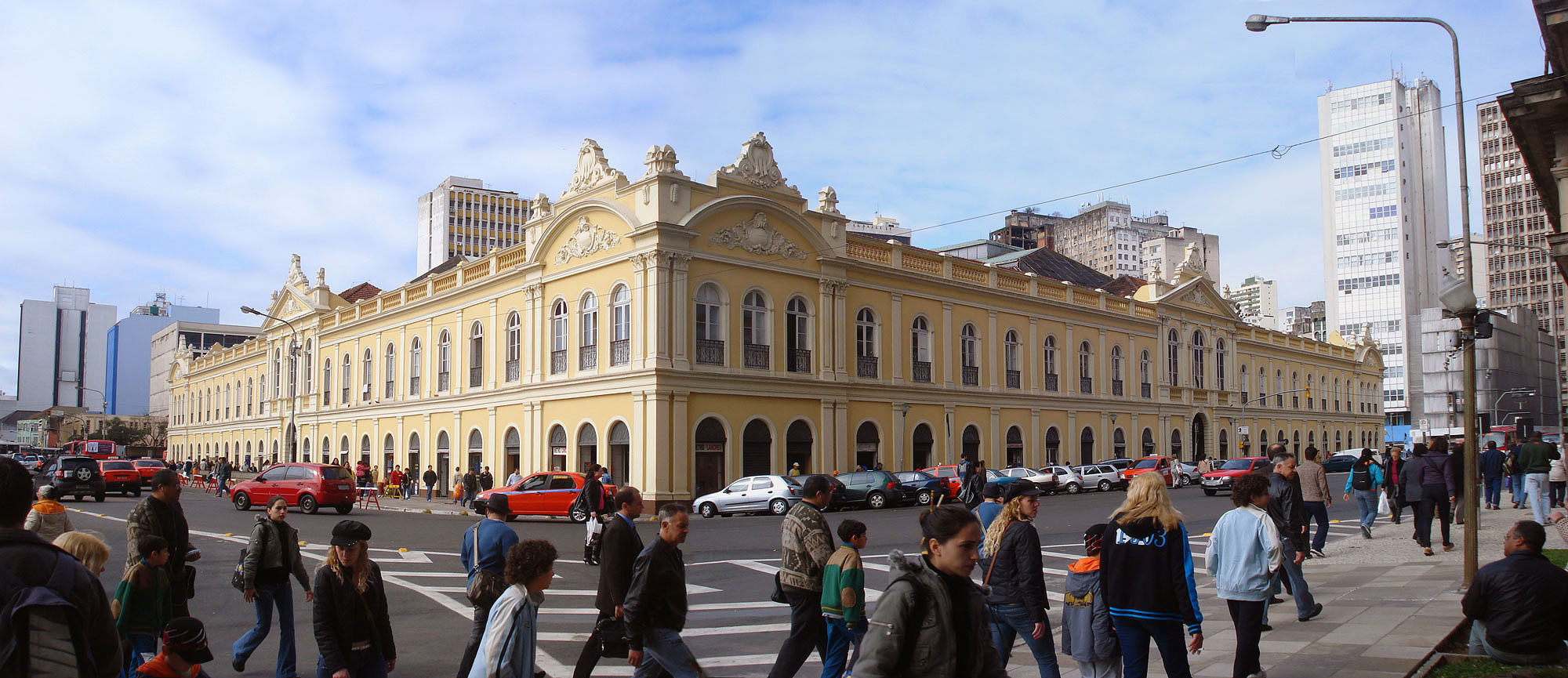
- Porto Alegre Public Market
- Interactive map of the Porto Alegre Public Market area

General information
- Status: Completed
- Type: Market building
- Location: Centro Histórico, Porto Alegre, Brazil
- Coordinates: 30°1′39.14″S 51°13′41.13″W
- Construction started: 29 August 1864
- Inaugurated: 3 October 1869

The Porto Alegre Public Market, in downtown Porto Alegre, Brazil, is the city's oldest public market. It is a historic landmark and a known meeting point, with many coffee shops and restaurants. There are about 109 shops in the market. It is next to the Town Hall of Porto Alegre building and faces the Chalé da Praça XV.

The Public Market is part of the traditions of the city, mainly for its "Banca 40" (an ice cream parlor), its restaurant Gambrinus and its traditional bar, the 101-year-old Bar Naval (Navy Bar).

== History ==
The market was constructed on 29 August 1864 over a smaller market. Frederico Heydtmann designed the building, but his plan was substantially altered and enlarged. The inauguration took place on 3 October 1869. In 1886, 24 small shops were installed in the inner yard.

In 1912, while undergoing renovation, a fire destroyed all the stalls in the inner area. A second floor was added in 1913. The market suffered from a major flood in 1941 and from additional fires in 1976, 1979 and 2013. In the administration of Telmo Thompson Flores, it ran the risk of being demolished, but the outcry led to the decision backings.

In 1990, the city administration organized a multidisciplinary team to develop a restoration project. The restoration included a steel and glass structure to cover the large area of the inner yard and a new cover for the integration between the ground floor and second floor. The second floor, where there were offices and public offices before, now has restaurants, snack bars and coffee shops. The cost of the renovation was R$9 million at the time. 88% of the revenue came from PMPA, with the remaining 12% from FUNMERCADO and others.

On 6 July 2013, the Public Market caught fire again. The fire is believed to have started at 20:30 UTC–3 on the upper floor at the corner of Avenida Borges de Medeiros and Júlio de Castilhos. Reports say that no people were injured, but 30% of the structure appeared to have burned down.

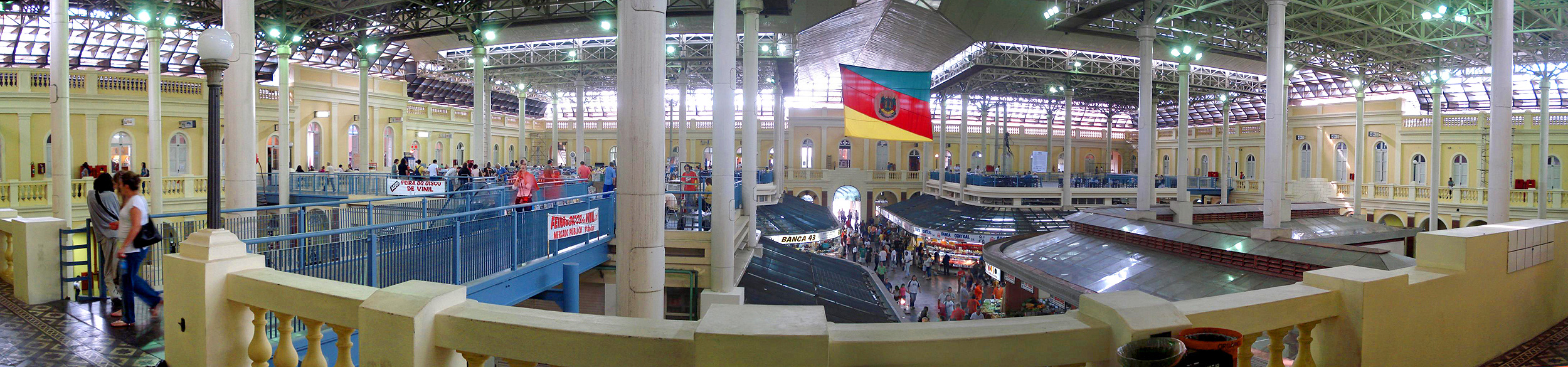
The inner yard after restoration

== See also ==
- Architecture of Porto Alegre
