= Centro Histórico, Porto Alegre =

Coordinates: 12°58′S 38°31′W

Centro Histórico
- Neighborhood of Porto Alegre
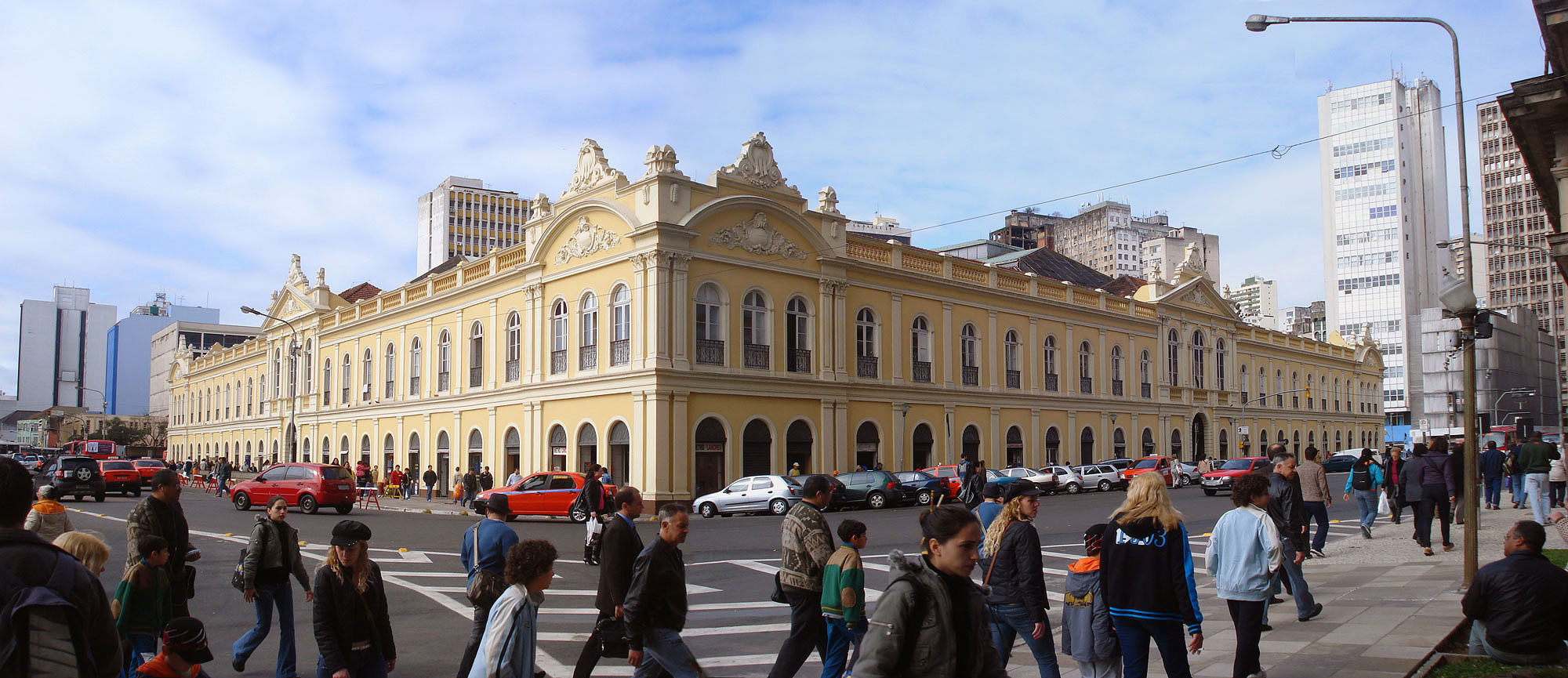
- The Porto Alegre Public Market (Mercado Público de Porto Alegre)

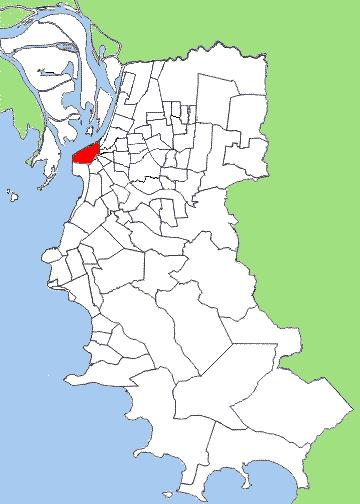
- Centro Histórico within Porto Alegre
- Country: Brazil
- State: Rio Grande do Sul
- Municipality/city: Porto Alegre
- Founded: 7 December 1959

Area
  - Total: 228 ha (560 acres)

Population (2010)
  - Total: 39,154
  - Density: 17,200/km^{2} (44,500/sq mi)

Centro Histórico (English: Historic District) is a neighborhood of the city of Porto Alegre, the state capital of Rio Grande do Sul in Brazil.

The neighborhood was created by Law 2022 of December 7, 1959.

- Population: 39,154 2010
- Area: 228 hectares
- Density: 162 hab/ha/km^{2}
- Number of housing units 17,254

The Historic Center is the oldest urbanized area of Porto Alegre, and since its origin it has been its main vital focus, being the seat of municipal and state governance and a concentration point for commerce, banks, museums, and cultural centers. It is a region steeped in history, with a large number of buildings inventoried or listed at the municipal, state, or national level, illustrating all the evolutionary phases of Porto Alegre's architecture, with many examples of superlative importance. Densely built up, in the second half of the 20th century it began to experience progressive degradation, with the proliferation of illegal street vendors, deterioration of historic buildings, population exodus, security and hygiene problems, and traffic congestion. Since then, it has been the target of a series of development and revitalization projects, which have yielded positive results, but many problems remain unresolved and surrounded by controversy.

== History ==
The origins of the neighborhood are intertwined with the very formation of Porto Alegre. Its settlement began around 1732 when some families settled on the shores of Lake Guaíba, where now is located the promenade Rua da Praia. The settlers erected a tiny chapel dedicated to São Francisco das Chagas, in 1747, and around this chapel the first urbanization of the future Porto Alegre began to effectively organize itself.

In 1750, the governor of Santa Catarina, Manoel Escudeiro de Souza, received orders to send to Porto do Viamão part of the couples who were about to arrive from the Azores to colonize the south of the country. In 1751, 60 families were selected, making a total of about 300 people, who arrived at the site in January 1752. At the time, an area of 141 hectares was delimited for the consolidation of the urban center, occupying the entire peninsula.

From then on, the small city began to be reorganized to fulfill its new role. In 1774 the War Arsenal, the first Mother Church and the Governor's Palace were built, and four years later fortifications were built on the perimeter opposite the lake. In the next two decades there were already several potteries in activity, indicating a growing building activity, shipyards were already building ships to order for Rio de Janeiro, commerce in general was structured, and councilors were concerned with the beautification and cleaning of streets and public places . They also began to take shape in none of the oldest squares in Porto Alegre, such as Praça XV, Praça da Matriz and Praça da Alfândega.

During the Ragamuffin War, the center was surrounded by fortifications, but despite the population increase, the urban fabric would only grow again in 1845, with the end of the Revolution and the overthrow of the defense lines. The importance of the city's port for the circulation of people and goods throughout the Province grew accordingly, which would initiate a process of expansion of the city at the expense of the lake, with the construction of successive improvements and landfills on the coast. At the center, improvements were made to various public facilities, building fountains for water supply, modernizing public lighting, extending streets, creating new cemeteries, a new jail, nursing homes and a new Town Hall, a large opera house (Theatro São Pedro), expanding the Public Market and structuring medical care with two hospital complexes.

This acceleration, lasting until the mid-1930s, was known as the golden phase of Porto Alegre architecture, renewing the urban landscape according to the aesthetics of eclecticism, which, influenced by the prestigious German community, was quickly imitated by the elites for the construction of their new palaces. That was when some of the capital's most significant and luxurious public buildings were erected, some loaded with ethical, social and political symbolism, which were most conspicuously revealed in the allegorical decoration of the façades. Illustrative examples of this trend are the Piratini Palace, the Municipal Palace, the Public Library, the Bank of the Province, the Post Office and the Tax Office, most of them built in partnership between the architect Theodor Wiederspahn, the engineer Rudolf Ahrons and the decorator João Vicente Friedrichs, all of German origin. This urban evolution accompanied the emergence of a new bourgeois culture, stimulated by the influx of new migrants and immigrants, by the introduction of new technologies in the area of transport and engineering, and by the consolidation of a capitalist elite, which made sociability and urban spaces more complex, exclusive and diversified.

The 1950s were the heyday of the Center of Porto Alegre; it was already densely built and had Rua da Praia as the main catwalk for the elite, transformed from a wholesaler's point into an elegant shopping area, also attracting the installation of numerous cafes, patisseries, cinemas and restaurants. It has also become the preferred venue for popular gatherings at civic events and political demonstrations, sometimes witnessing scenes of collective violence. Thompson Flores, taking over City Hall in 1969, carried out a government characterized by major works, especially in the area of transport, favored by the economic boom of the Brazilian Miracle. He built large viaducts, but the technical approach to the projects as a rule disregarded the popular will in prioritizing investments and elementary aspects of urban landscaping, and in this progressive zeal, numerous old buildings disappeared, some of great historical and architectural significance. The physiognomy of the center was impoverished.

== Landmarks ==
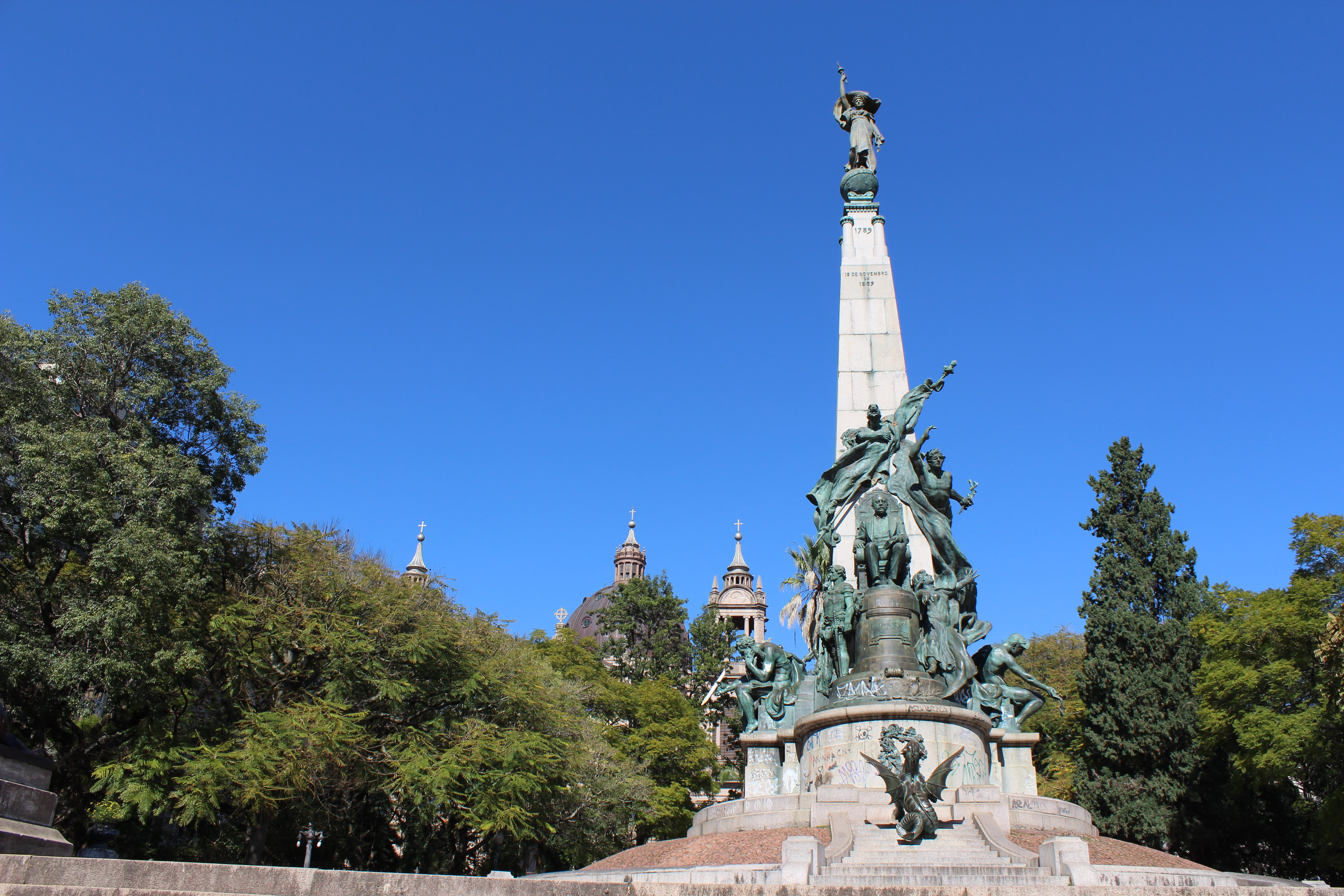
- Praça da Matriz - Porto Alegre, RS, Brazil
  Praça da Matriz (Square Marechal Deodoro);
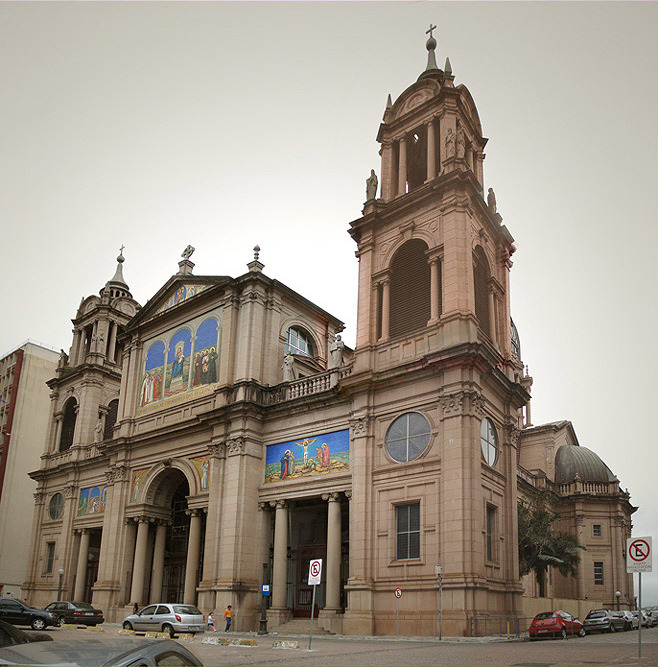
- Metropolitan Cathedral of Porto Alegre - RS, Brazil
  Metropolitan Cathedral of Porto Alegre;
- Piratini Palace, the seat of the state government of Rio Grande do Sul;
- São Pedro Theatre;
- Farroupilha Palace, the seat of Legislative Assembly of state of Rio Grande do Sul;
- Casa da Junta, former seat of the Legislative Assembly of the state;
- Alfândega Square;
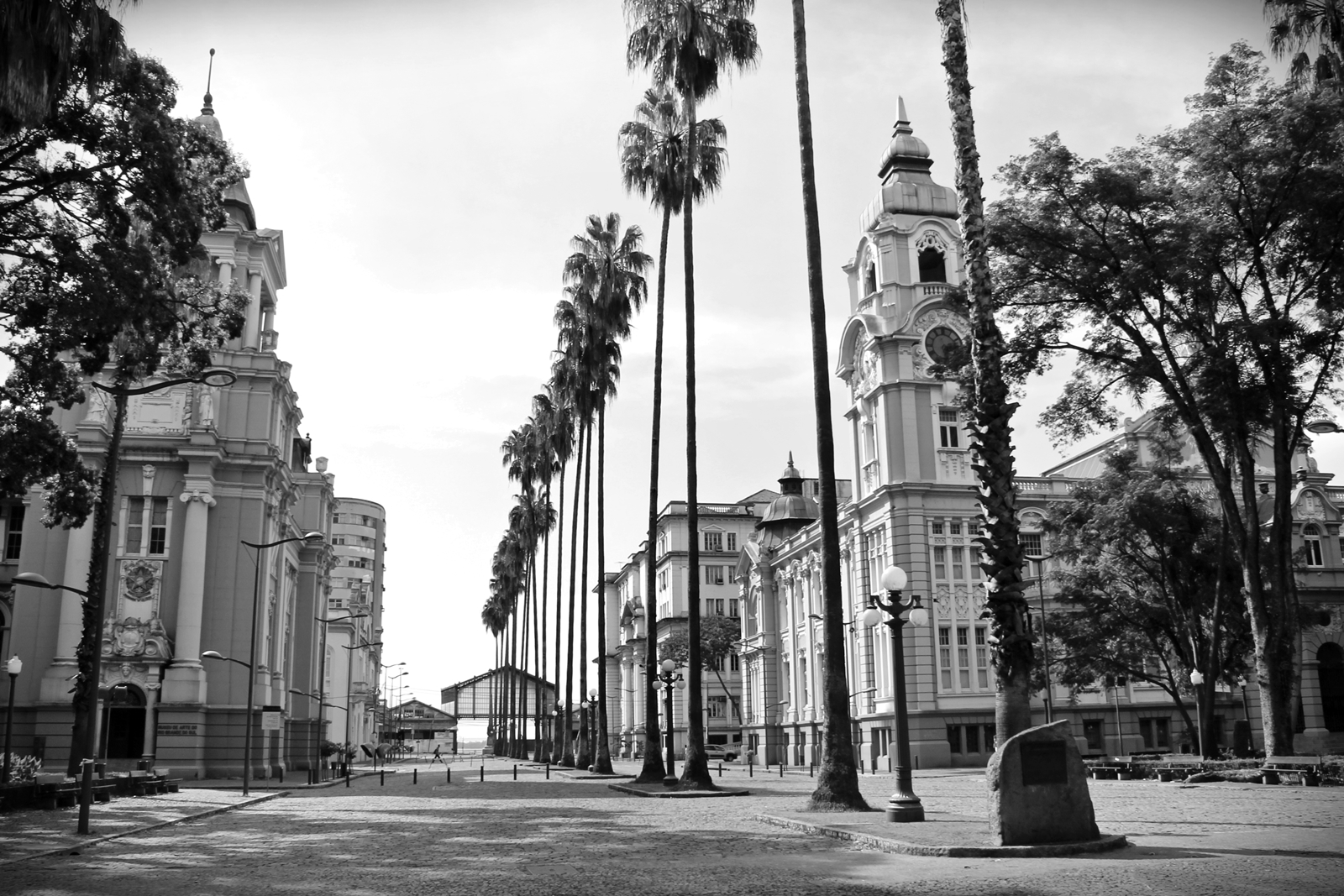
  Praça da Alfândega - Porto Alegre, RS, Brazil
- Rio Grande do Sul Museum of Art;
- Porto Alegre Public Market;
- Promenade Rua da Praia;
- Gasômetro;
- Buildings of the Federal University of Rio Grande do Sul (UFRGS);
- State Public Library of Rio Grande do Sul;
- Santander Cultural Museum;
- Mario Quintana Culture House
- Rio Grande do Sul Memorial Museum
- Júlio de Castilhos Museum

== Modern Limits ==
It is limited by the Guaíba and six neighborhoods: Cidade Baixa, Farroupilha, Bom Fim, Independência, Floresta and Praia de Belas.

Starting and ending point: meeting of Loureiro da Silva Av. with João Goulart Av., on the promenade Luiz Celso Gomes Hyarup. From this point, follow João Goulart Av. along the shore of Lake Guaíba, skirting Ponta do Gasômetro, through Cais Mauá. From there, it follows a straight and imaginary line until the intersection of Castelo Branco Av. with Largo Vespasiano Júlio Veppo, to the Conceição Road Complex (tunnel, elevated, Conceição St.) until it merges into Sarmento Leite St. Finally, it follows that way to Luiz Englert St, Loureiro da Silva Av. and back to João Goulart Av., starting point.

== See also ==
- Neighborhoods of Porto Alegre
- Architecture of Porto Alegre
- Companhia Carris Porto-Alegrense
- Independência Avenue
