= Floresta, Rio Grande do Sul =

Neighbourhood in Porto Alegre, Brazil

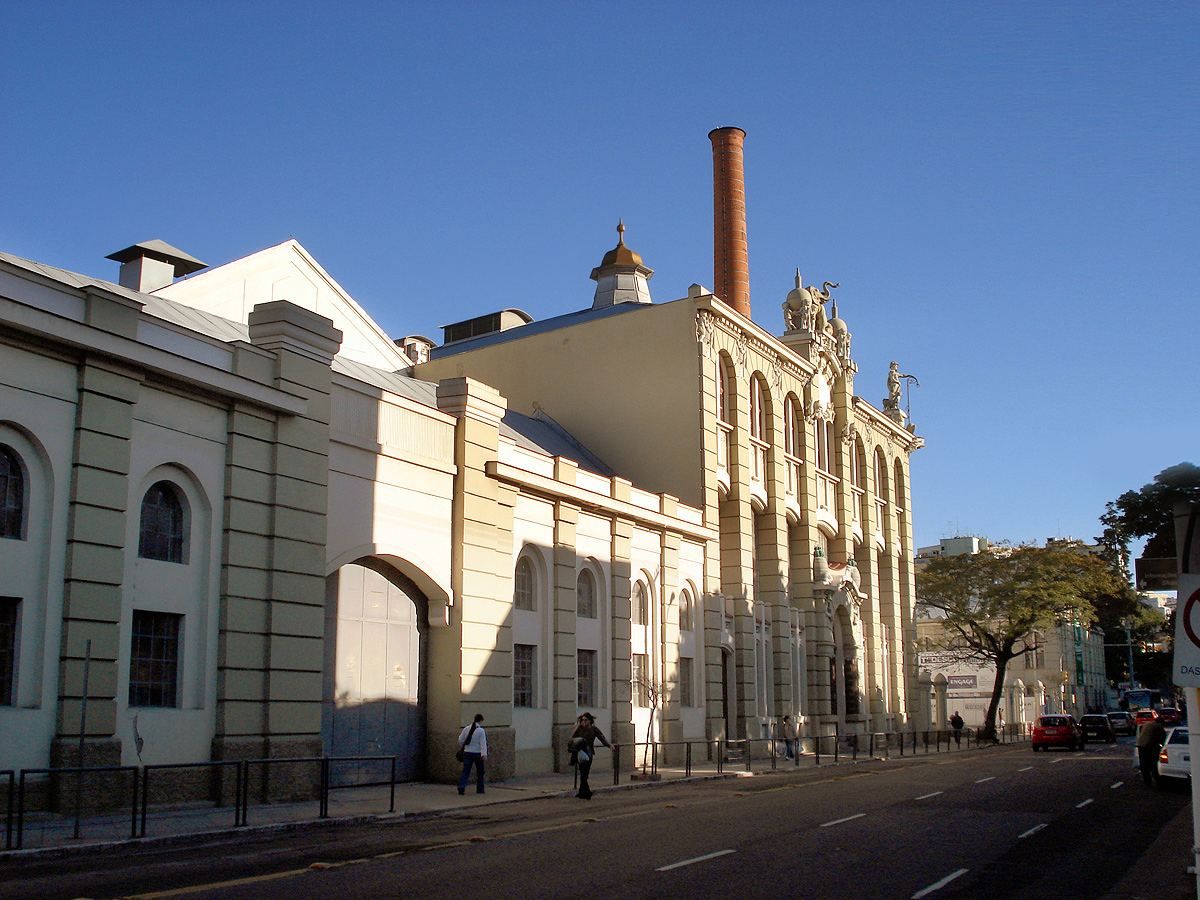
The former building of Brahma, now part of a shopping mall.

Floresta (meaning Forest in Portuguese) is a neighbourhood (bairro) in the city of Porto Alegre, the state capital of Rio Grande do Sul, Brazil. It was created by Law 2022 from December 7, 1959.

In the past, the area of Floresta was a hill covered with a dense vegetation, but it became urbanized and industrial as a result of logging and the arrival of companies. Nowadays, it is mainly residential and commercial. Floresta also hosts many nightclubs, therefore prostitution, violence and vandalism became major problems in the region.
