= Piratini Palace =

Seat of the Governor of Rio Grande do Sul

- Palácio Piratini
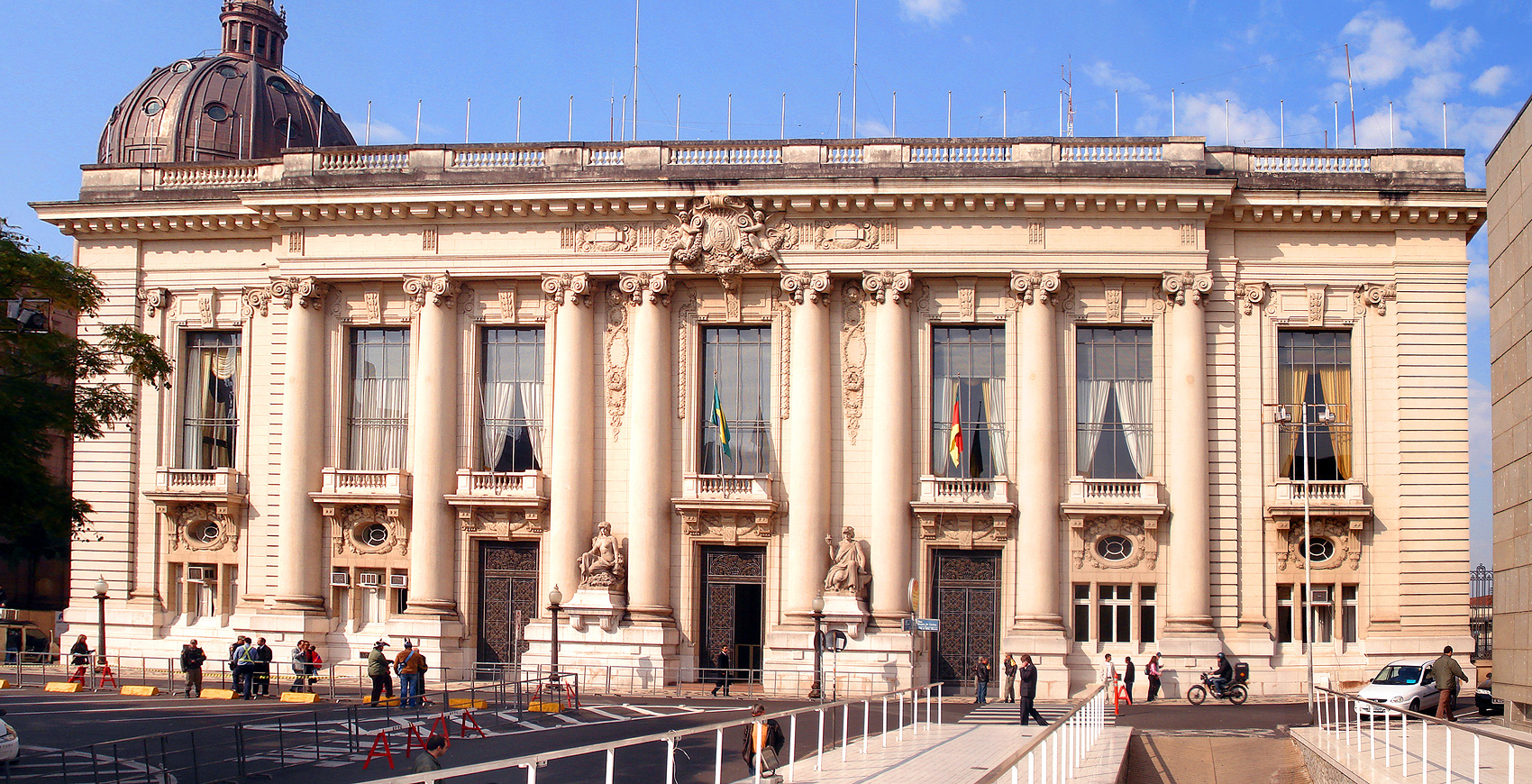
- Main facade of the Piratini Palace
- Interactive map of the Piratini Palace area

General information
- Architectural style: Neoclassical
- Location: Porto Alegre, Rio Grande do Sul, Brazil
- Coordinates: 30°02′02″S 51°13′51″W
- Construction started: 1909
- Inaugurated: 1970s

Design and construction
- Architect: Maurice Gras

The Piratini Palace (Portuguese: Palácio Piratini) is the current seat of the Executive Branch of the Brazilian state of Rio Grande do Sul. It is located at Marechal Deodoro Square, also known as the Mother Church Square, in Porto Alegre's historic center. The Piratini Palace has been the official residence of thirty-eight governors.

== History ==
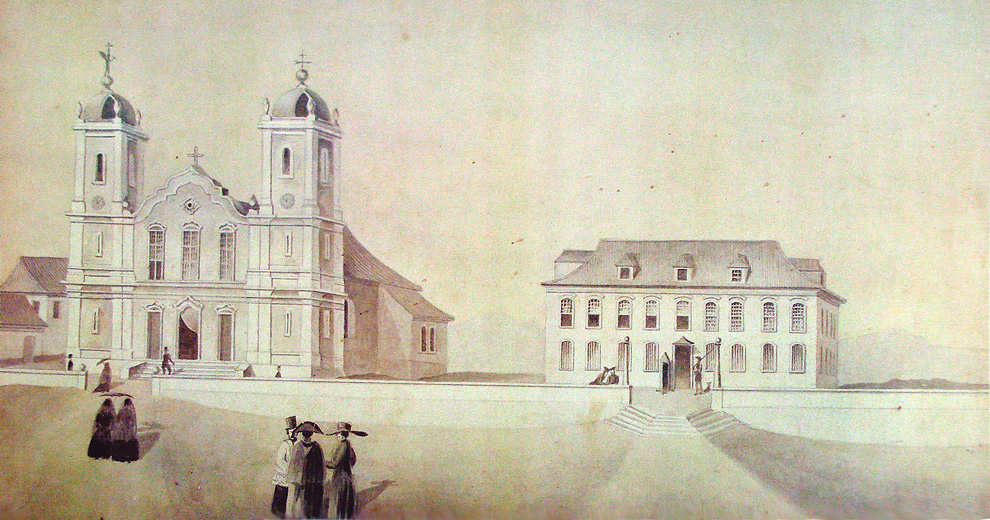
Herrmann Wendroth, 1852: The old Government Palace, which preceded the Piratini Palace, next to the old Mother Church.

Piratini was built to replace the old Palácio de Barro (English: Clay Palace), which existed on the same site and had been built in 1773 by order of then governor José Marcelino de Figueiredo. By the end of the 19th century, the original building was in very bad condition, making it necessary to build a new one, which happened by order of the state president Júlio de Castilhos.

The first project for the new palace was designed by architect Affonso Hebert, from the Secretariat of Public Works, and the first cornerstone was laid on October 27, 1896. However, the pace of the work was slow and constantly decreasing, until, with the structure still unfinished, the works were suspended by the new state president, Carlos Barbosa Gonçalves, alleging that the construction did not meet the requirements of the time. The Secretary of Public Works at the time, Cândido José de Godoy, seems to have had an influential role in choosing a richer project that would make the Piratini "the most beautiful and majestic public building in Brazil". To this end, the government sent a delegation to Paris in 1908 to hold an international competition for a new floor plant to replace Hebert's.

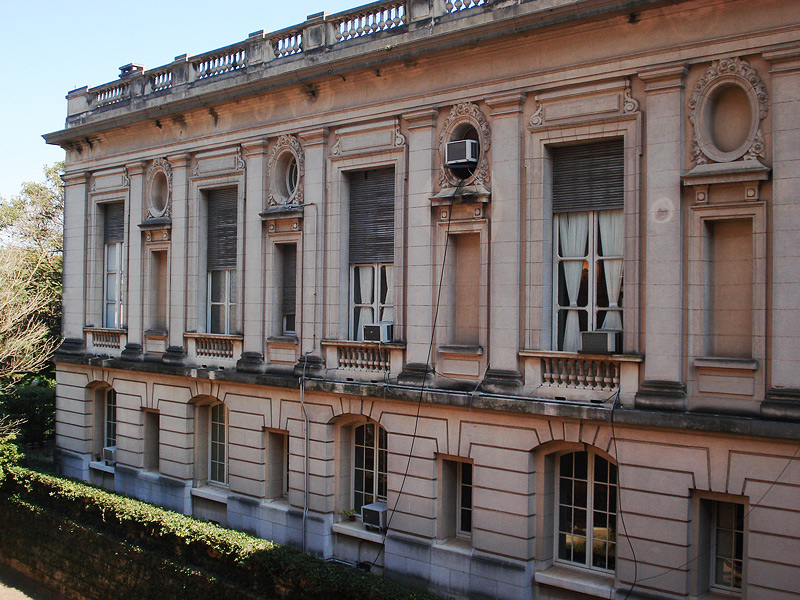
Detail of Piratini's south (residential) wing.

The contest attracted only two participants: A. Agustín Rey and A. Janin. Even though they were praised, their designs were also not used. A year later, French architect Maurice Gras came to Rio Grande do Sul and was introduced to President Carlos Barbosa by French diplomatic representatives in Brazil. He presented a new proposal, which was approved, and on September 20, 1909, the second cornerstone of the palace was laid. The work restarted quickly, but when Barbosa left the government in January 1913, much remained to be done. For many reasons, the works proceeded slowly, only being accelerated in the early 1920s, during the fourth administration of Borges de Medeiros.

On May 16, 1921, the building could be occupied, but without an official inauguration and in a partial way, because the residential wings, the noble halls and the gardens were not finished. It was not until the 1970s that the palace was reported as completed, although minor work continued to be done and restoration interventions were already beginning to be needed in some older areas.

In 1955, through a decree issued by governor Ildo Meneghetti, the official name of the Piratini Palace was given, as a way to honor the first capital of the Riograndense Republic (1836-1845) during the Farroupilha Revolution (1835-1845).

=== Bombing attempt ===
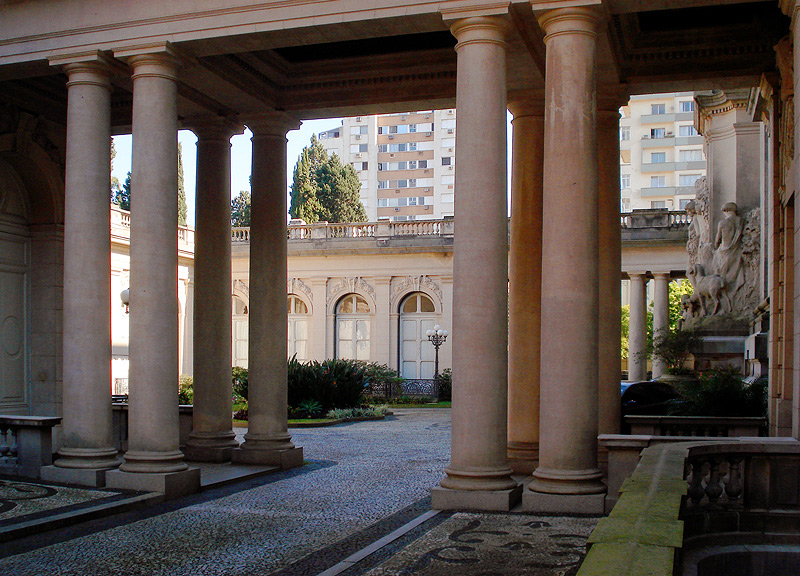
Detail of the internal gardens.

One of the most remarkable events in its history was the Bombing Order of the Piratini Palace that took place during the term of governor Leonel Brizola, when, due to the Legality Campaign, in 1961, the federal government decreed the bombing of the Palace. However, the order was not obeyed by the soldiers at the Canoas air base. At the time, about 30 thousand people were camped in front of Piratini, demanding the inauguration of João Goulart as President of the Republic.

=== Present Day ===
The building was included in the Monumenta Project of the Brazilian Ministry of Culture with support from the IDB and UNESCO, which aims to revitalize historic centers in Brazil. Since 1986, the building has been considered a State Historic and Artistic Heritage Site, and in 2000, Piratini was listed by the National Institute of Historic and Artistic Heritage.

== Details of the palace ==
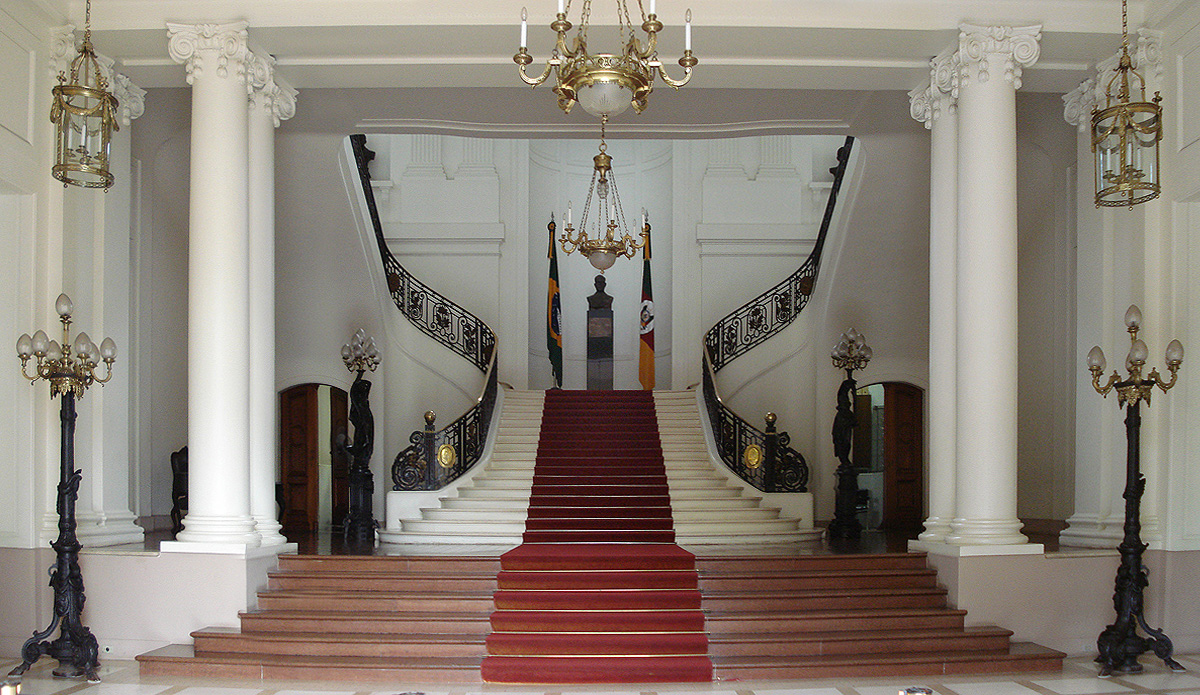
Main lobby, staircase.

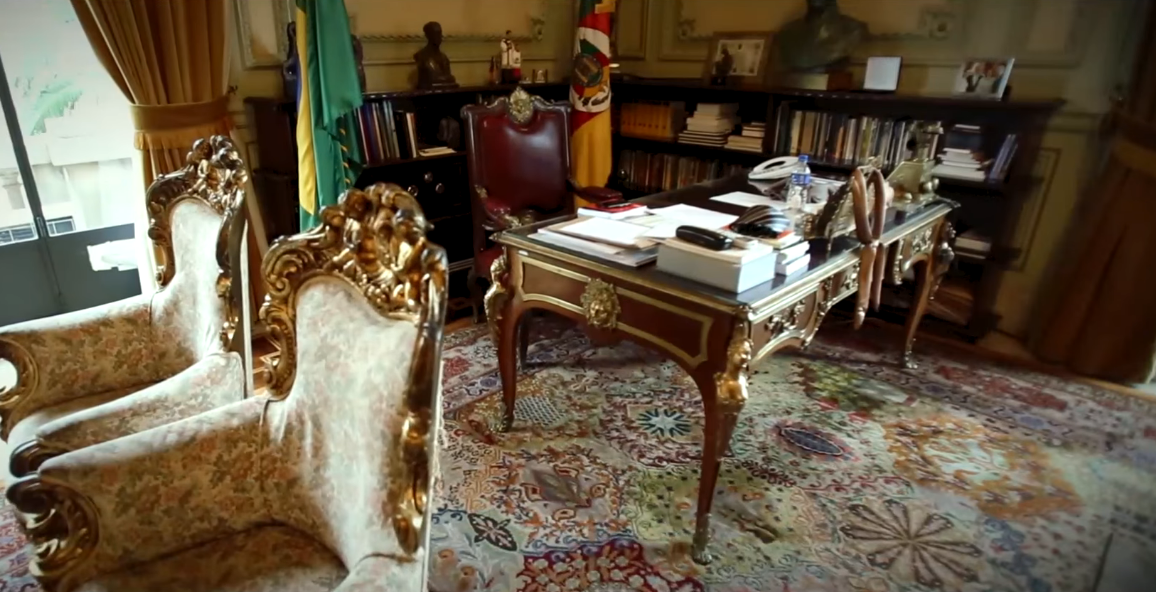
Office of the Governor of Rio Grande do Sul.

The neoclassical influence is dominant. On the facade, two sculptures representing Agriculture and Industry by Paul Landowski, the creator of the Christ the Redeemer statue, stand out. In the main lobby and in the governor's office there are two works by Pelotas sculptor Antonio Caringi: the bust of Getúlio Vargas (going up the main staircase) and O Laçador (a work that symbolizes the city of Porto Alegre). A sumptuous French marble staircase leads to the governor's office, where there are some rarities: an old gold-plated telephone, a gift from the Telephone Company to Borges de Medeiros, and a 42-square-meter carpet from 1930.

In the Negrinho do Pastoreio and Alberto Pasqualini halls, the chandeliers are replicas of those in the Palace of Versailles. Murals by Italian painter Aldo Locatelli illustrate episodes from the History of Rio Grande do Sul. Part of the furniture was made by inmates of the former House of Correction of Porto Alegre, and the sills and baseboards were sculpted in Carrara marble.

Paul Landowski's art is also present in the inner courtyard, with the sculptural group A Primavera. In the garden, there is a fountain with Egyptian themes and a sculpture of Negrinho do Pastoreio, by Vasco Prado. In 1971, the Crioulo shed was built in the external area, where visitors are welcomed with demonstrations of traditional gaucho cuisine and culture.

== Public Visitation ==
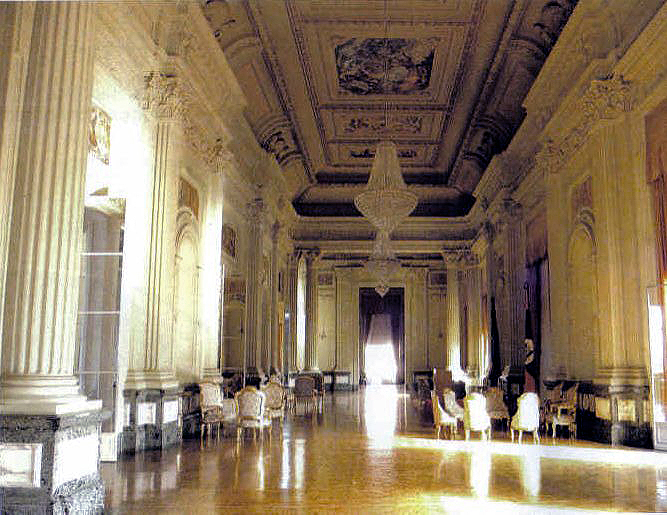
Negrinho do Pastoreio Hall.

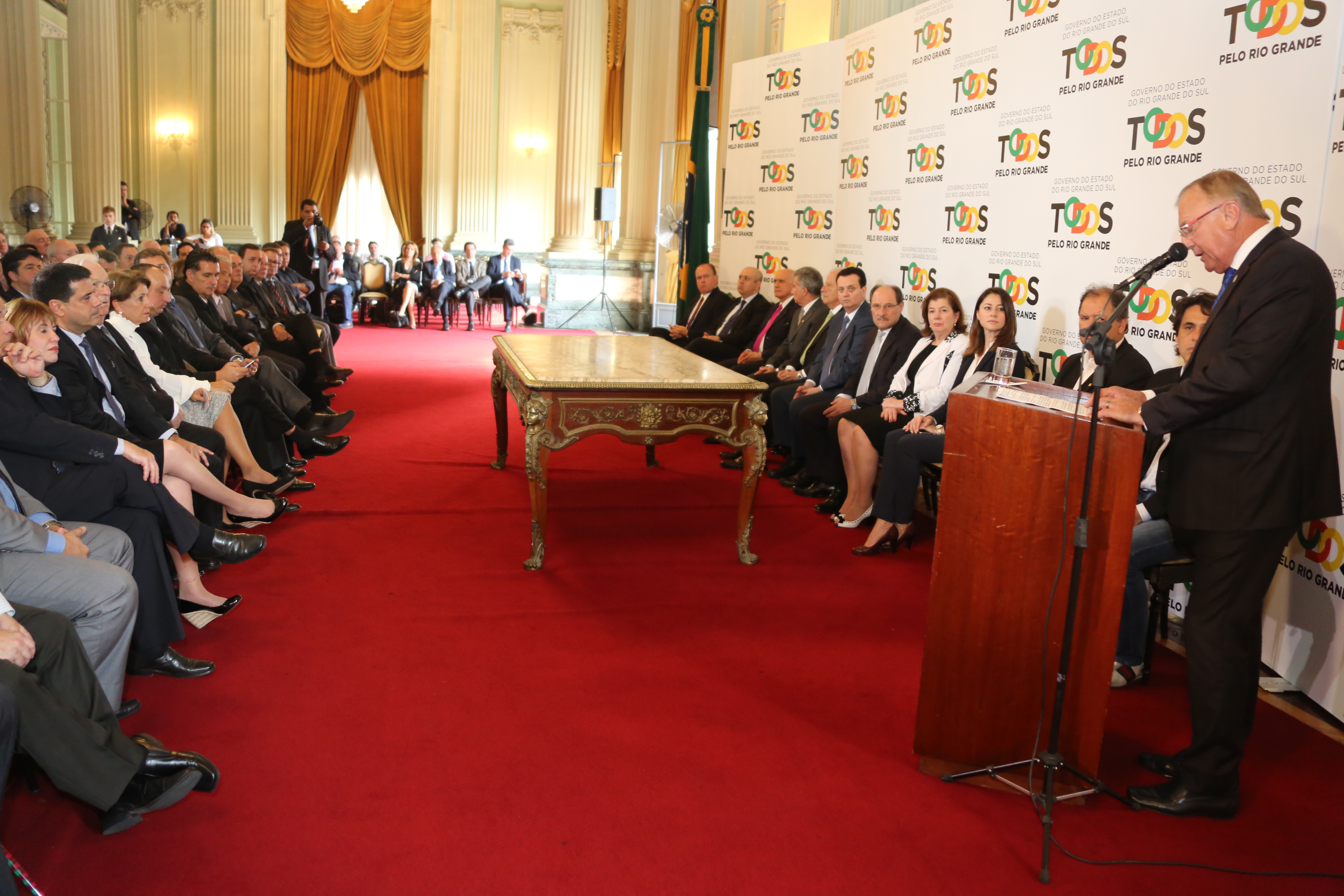
Event being held in the Banquet Hall.

Piratini is open to public visitation. Accompanied by guides, visits can be made from Mondays to Fridays, from 9am to 5pm, in Portuguese, English, and Spanish. The weekly public visitation only allows to see the Entrance Hall, two antique cars (a 1919 Ford Model T and a 1929 German car), the main staircase, and the Negrinho do Pastoreio Hall.

=== Main rooms ===
- Main Lobby
- Negrinho do Pastoreio Hall
- Alberto Pasqualini Hall
- Residential wing
- Banquet hall
- Hall of Mirrors
- Palace Gardens
- Crioulo shed

== See also ==
- History of Porto Alegre
- History of Rio Grande do Sul
- Architecture of Porto Alegre
- Palace of the Public Ministry
