= List of neighborhoods of Porto Alegre =

Below is a list of the 78 bairros (neighborhoods) and four territories of Porto Alegre, Brazil.

== A ==
- Aberta dos Morros
- Agronomia
- Anchieta
- Arquipélago
- Auxiliadora
- Azenha

== B ==
- Bela Vista
- Belém Novo
- Belém Velho
- Boa Vista
- Bom Fim
- Bom Jesus

== C ==
- Camaquã
- Cascata
- Cavalhada
- Cel. Aparício Borges
- Centro Histórico
- Chácara das Pedras
- Cidade Baixa
- Cristal
- Cristo Redentor

== E ==
- Espírito Santo

== F ==
- Farrapos
- Farroupilha
- Floresta

== G ==
- Glória
- Guarujá

== H ==
- Higienópolis
- Hípica
- Humaitá

== I ==
- Independência
- Ipanema

== J ==
- Jardim Botânico
- Jardim Carvalho
- Jardim do Salso
- Jardim Isabel
- Jardim Floresta
- Jardim Itu-Sabará
- Jardim Lindoia
- Jardim São Pedro

== L ==
- Lami
- Lomba do Pinheiro

== M ==
- Marcílio Dias
- Mário Quintana
- Medianeira
- Menino Deus
- Moinhos de Vento
- Mont' Serrat

== N ==
- Navegantes
- Nonoai

== P ==
- Partenon
- Passo d'Areia
- Pedra Redonda
- Petrópolis
- Ponta Grossa
- Praia de Belas

== R ==
- Restinga
- Rio Branco
- Rubem Berta

== S ==
- Santa Cecília, Porto Alegre
- Santa Maria Goretti
- Santa Tereza
- Santana
- Santo Antônio
- São Geraldo
- São João
- São José
- São Sebastião
- Sarandi
- Serraria

== T ==
- Teresópolis
- Três Figueiras
- Tristeza

== V ==
- Vila Assunção
- Vila Conceição
- Vila Ipiranga
- Vila Jardim
- Vila João Pessoa
- Vila Nova
