= Cidade Baixa, Porto Alegre =

Neighborhood in Porto Alegre, Brazil

Coordinates: 30°02′22″S 51°13′22″W

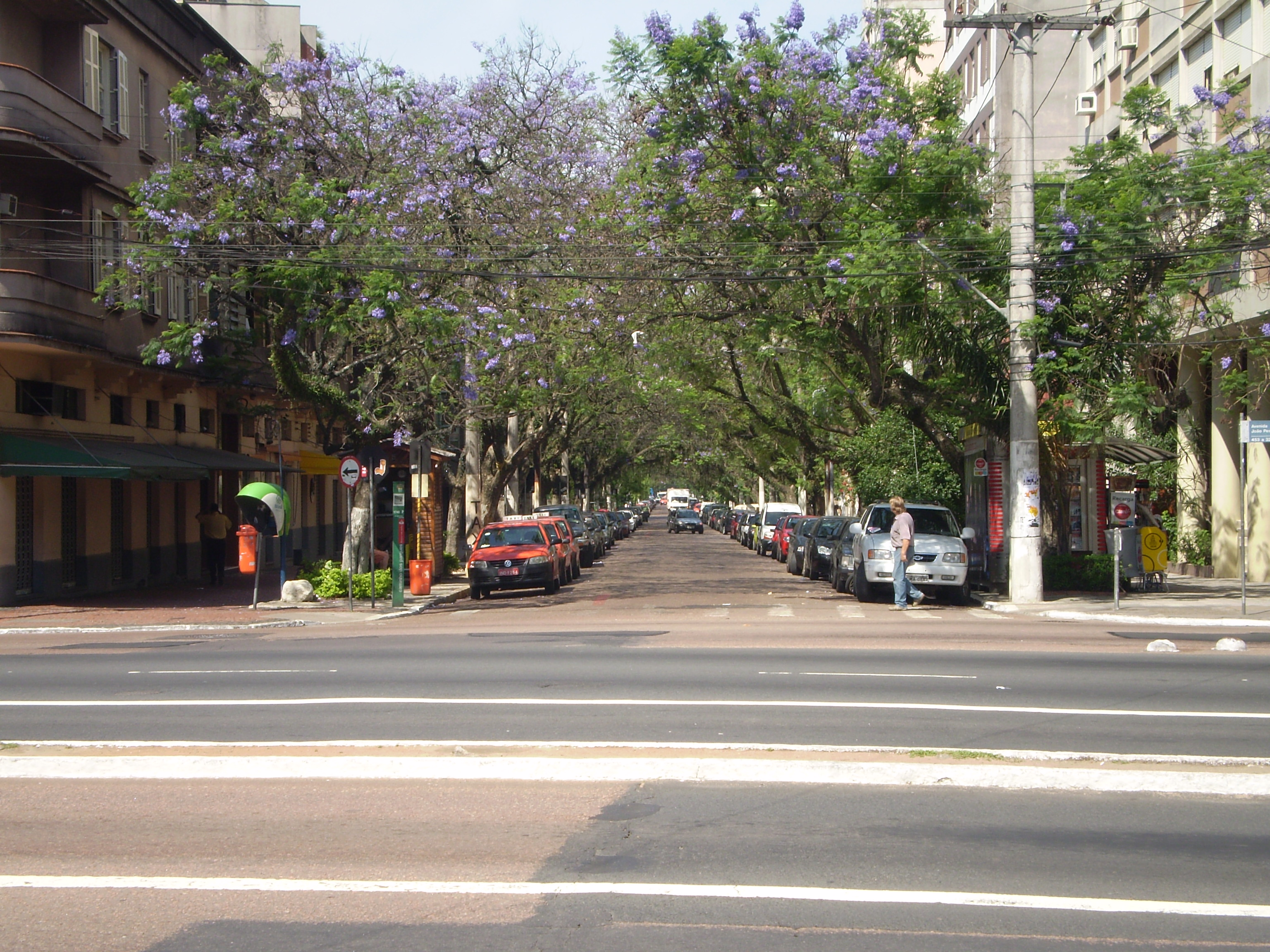
The Rua da República

Cidade Baixa (meaning Lower City) is a neighborhood of the city of Porto Alegre, the state capital of Rio Grande do Sul in Brazil. The neighborhood was created by the law number 2022 of December 7, 1959.

Nowadays Cidade Baixa is one of the main nightlife neighborhood of Porto Alegre. There are hundreds of bars and nightclubs particularly along the streets General Lima e Silva, República and João Alfredo. It is located next to the Farroupilha Park (also known as Redemption Park, or Parque da Redenção in Portuguese), one of the greenest areas in the city. Also, the proximity to the downtown Campus of the Federal University of Rio Grande do Sul (UFRGS) attracts many students, intellectuals and artists.

- Population: 19,838 (2010 census)
- Area: 210 hectares
- Density: 79.21 hab/ha/km^{2}
- Number of housing units: 7,821

== Historical Background ==
Settlement in this region, located to the south of the former Altos da Matriz, began at the end of the 18th century when Arvoredo Street was founded. In 1845, República Street and Venâncio Aires Avenue were stablished. In 1856, the Municipal Chamber proposed a new street layout for a large part of the region, considering the rapid growth of the population in the area. However, the plans did not materialize, and much of Cidade Baixa remained uninhabited for several years, especially the stretch of the former Areal da Baronesa, between the current streets Venâncio Aires and República. The implementation of animal-drawn tram lines on Caminho da Azenha and Margem Street contributed to the urbanization of the site. As of 1880, new streets were founded, such as Lopo Gonçalves, Luiz Afonso, and Joaquim Nabuco. From that point onwards, urbanization grew, and the neighborhood acquired a bohemian character and started to grow to its current formation.

== Modern Limits ==
The starting and ending point is where Praia de Belas Av. meets Aureliano de Figueiredo Pinto Av.; from there walk down Aureliano de Figueiredo Pinto Av. to Garibaldi Square, then to Venâncio Aires Av., until reaching João Pessoa Av. From there, walk down to Avenida Loureiro da Silva, along that to Avenida Borges de Medeiros, and back to Praia de Belas Av., the starting point.

Cidade Baixa is limited by the Historic District, Praia de Belas, Menino Deus, Azenha and Farroupilha.

== Landmarks ==
Green areas

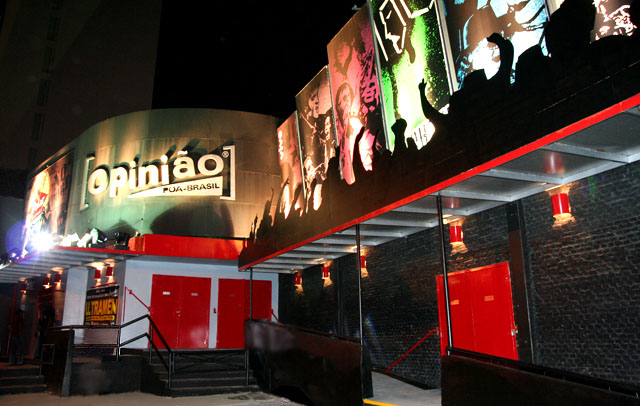
Bar Opinião - Porto Alegre, RS, Brazil

- Largo Zumbi dos Palmares
- Canon Marcelino Square
- Laurentino Zottis Square
- Professor Saint-Pastous Square

Education

- State Elementary School Rio de Janeiro
- State Elementary School Prof. Olintho de Oliveira
- State Elementary School Profª. Leopolda Barnewitz
- Institute Pão dos Pobres

Culture

- Tao Cultural Center
- Joaquim Felizardo Museum of Porto Alegre
- Bar Opinião

== See also ==
- Neighborhoods of Porto Alegre
