= Arroio Dilúvio =

Brook in Porto Alegre, Brazil

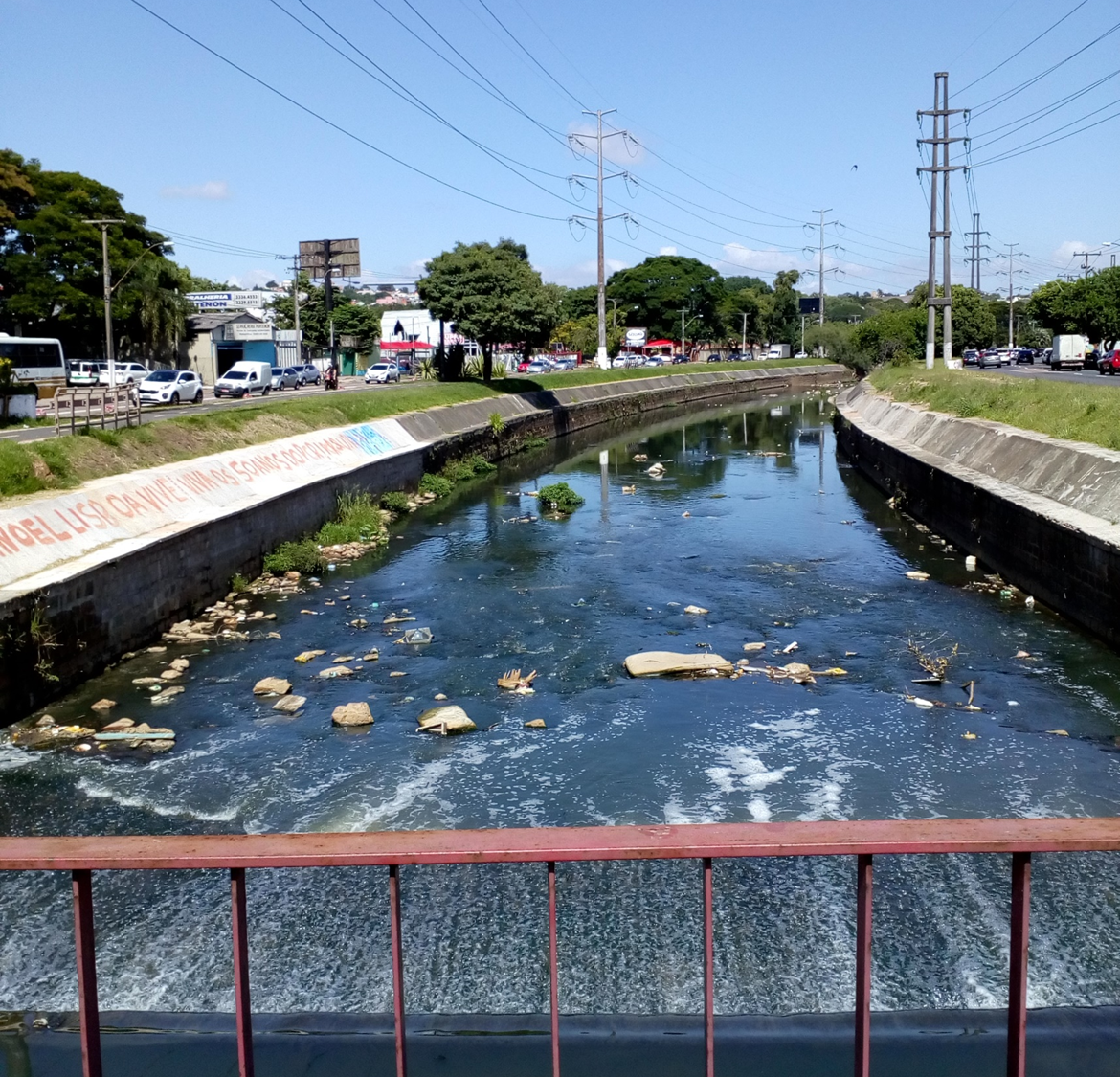

Location
- Country: Brazil
- State: Rio Grande do Sul

Physical characteristics
- Source: Saint'Hilaire Municipal Natural Park, Viamão
- Mouth: Guaíba Lake
  - coordinates: 30°02′51″S 51°14′04″W
- Length: 17 km (11 mi)

Basin features
- Cities: Porto Alegre and Viamão

Arroio Dilúvio is a brook (arroio) in Porto Alegre, Rio Grande do Sul, Brazil, that flows in areas with high population density. It was or still is known by other names: Riacho Ipiranga (resulting in the name of Ipiranga Avenue), Arroio da Azenha (watermill, resulting in the names of Azenha Avenue and Azenha neighborhood), Riacho or Riachinho and even Arroio do Sabão, this being the current name of the stream that gives it its most distant source.

== Geography ==
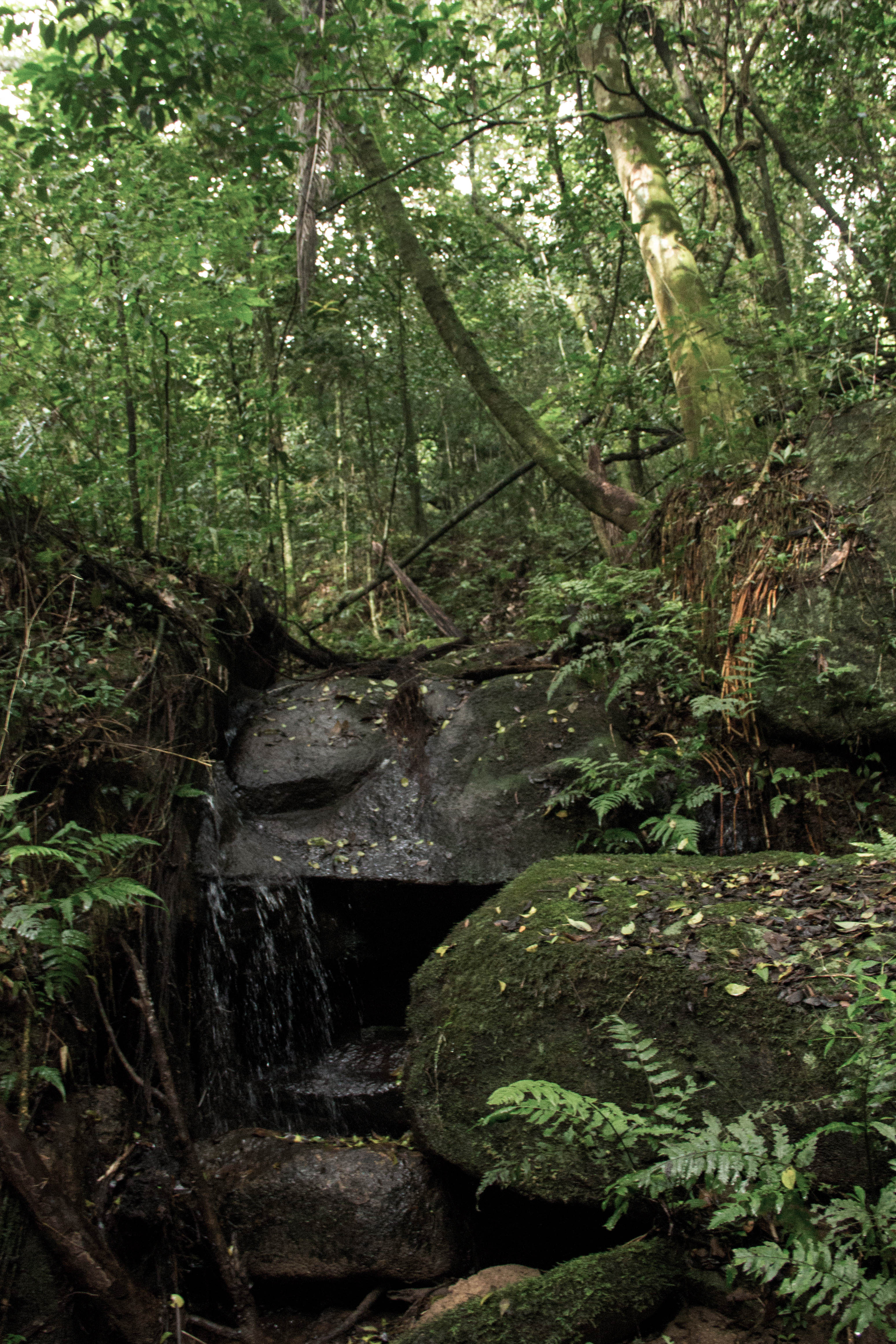
Arroio Dilúvio's spring

Running in an east–west direction, its most distant springs are in the Saint'Hilaire Municipal Natural Park, in Viamão.

It has a length of 17,605 meters from its springs to its mouth in Guaíba Lake. The canalized and rectified extension is estimated at 12 km, of which the final 10 km has a central channel between the lanes of Ipiranga Avenue, covering the route between Antônio de Carvalho Avenue and the mouth.

== History ==
The first reference made to the Arroio Dilúvio appears in a letter dated 1740, called the Jacareí River, which means river of the alligators in the Guarani language, as the divider of the sesmaria of Jerônimo de Ornelas.

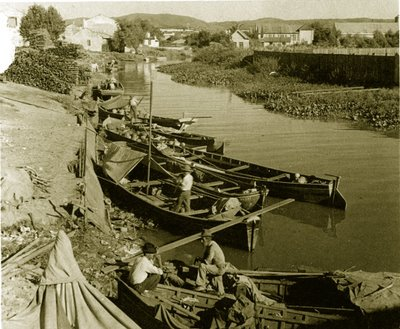
The Arroio Dilúvio before the canalization in the 1930s

In the old days, the stream flowed into the Ponta da Cadeia, next to the Gasômetro Power Plant, passing under the Stone Bridge (or Açores Bridge) near the Açorianos Square. The creek was re-channeled to its current course. The work that changed the course of the stream, including the construction of the lanes of Avenida Ipiranga, began during the administration of Mayor Loureiro da Silva.

The first canalized stretch was implemented between 1939 and 1943 from the mouth to the vicinity of Avenida João Pessoa. The work took more than 40 years to be completed. In its execution, the city government was assisted by the federal government, through the National Department of Works and Sanitation (DNOS).

== Pollution ==
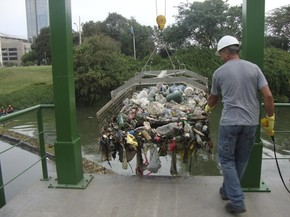
Ecobarrier

Until the 1950s, the Dilúvio had clean waters. It earned its name because it used to flood its neighborhoods, such as Menino Deus or Cidade Baixa, on days of heavy rain. In November 2009, the stream became muddy because of a heavy rain.

As of 2018, it is estimated that it receives about 50,000 cubic meters of sediments and waste per year, besides the sewage from three neighborhoods, requiring periodic dredging. The Arroio Dilúvio is one of the main pollution inputs to Guaíba Lake, the main public supply source of Porto Alegre. The sediments of the Dilúvio are contaminated with potentially toxic metals (Zn, Cu, Cr, and Pb), with these concentrations increasing the closer it is to the lake's mouth.

In 2011, it was found that in a two-year period (2009–2010), at least 20 cars fell into the Dilúvio stream due to the lack of sidewalk cords with sufficient height because of the asphalt retreading that made them lose height over the years without having corrections made by the city government.

In June 2011, the Federal University of Rio Grande do Sul (UFRGS) and the Pontifical Catholic University of Rio Grande do Sul (PUCRS)—both with teaching facilities located on Ipiranga Avenue, on the banks of the stream—proposed to the city government a partnership for the revitalization of the Dilúvio. The two universities wanted to adopt the model used to restore the Cheonggyecheon stream in Seoul, South Korea, which similarly flows through a large urbanized area of their city. Since its completion in 2002, the Cheonggyecheon has cleaned the waters and created a tree-shaded recreational areas on the banks.

In 2016, the project was reportedly stalled; the city government claims a lack of resources. Also in 2016, the Arroio Dilúvio Ecobarrier Project was created. Installed at the mouth, the project aims to collect waste that would flow into Lake Guaíba.

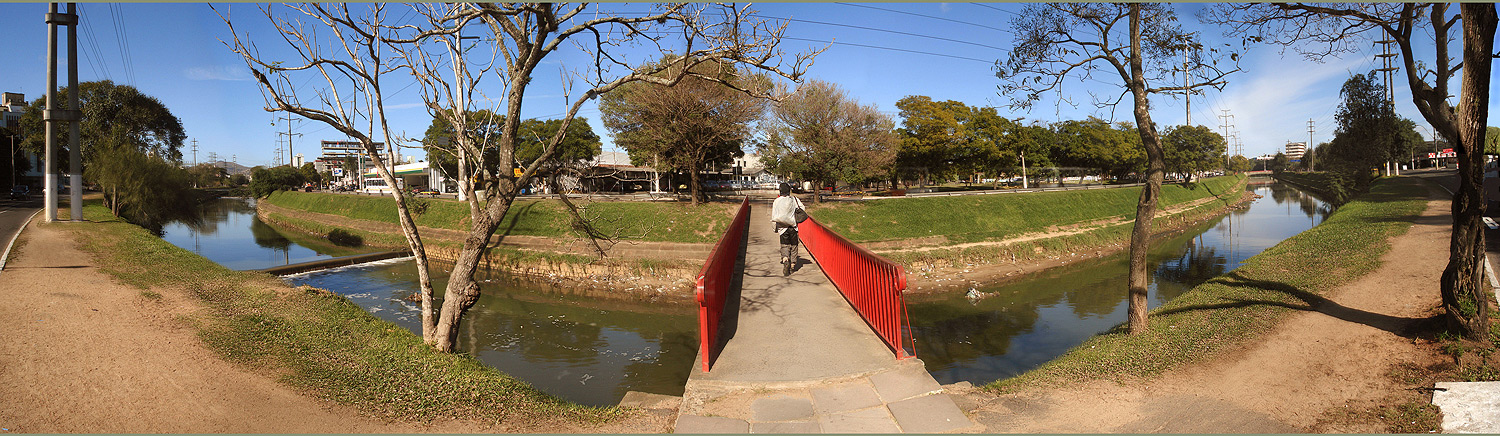
Arroio Dilúvio, between the Santana and Santa Cecília neighborhoods

== See also ==
- Environmentalism in Rio Grande do Sul
- Porto Alegre Botanical Garden
- Federal University of Rio Grande do Sul
- Pontifical Catholic University of Rio Grande do Sul
- Cheonggyecheon
