= Mauá Wall =

Flood protection structure in Brazil

Mauá Wall (Portuguese: Muro da Mauá) is a flood wall in the Historic Center of Porto Alegre, Rio Grande do Sul.

The reinforced concrete wall is located between Mauá Wharf and Mauá Avenue. It is 2,647 meters long, three meters high and it has a three-meter-deep anchored wall foundation, to help prevent underground percolation. It is part of a flood protection system consisting of 68 km of external and internal dikes, 14 metal gates and 19 pumping stations. The wall represents only 4% of the protective dikes' width and is located along the Navegantes Canal, a part of the Jacuí River Delta. The wall was finished in 1974.

The system was built in order to avoid catastrophe similar to the flood of 1941. The coupures had to be closed at various times after their construction.

As an alternative to the permanent wall, a modular stoplog system based on bleachers has been proposed.

== Flood protection system ==
In addition to the wall, the system has macro-drainage channels (such as Arroio Dilúvio and Arroio Cavalhada streams) and dikes set up under Beira-Rio (to the south) and Presidente Castello Branco avenues (to the north). The pump houses (with 83 pumps capable of pumping 159,000 L/s) are located at specific points in the city to move flood water to Guaíba Lake and Gravataí River.
