= Bom Fim =

Neighborhood in Porto Alegre, Brazil

Coordinates: 30°01′57″S 51°12′44″W

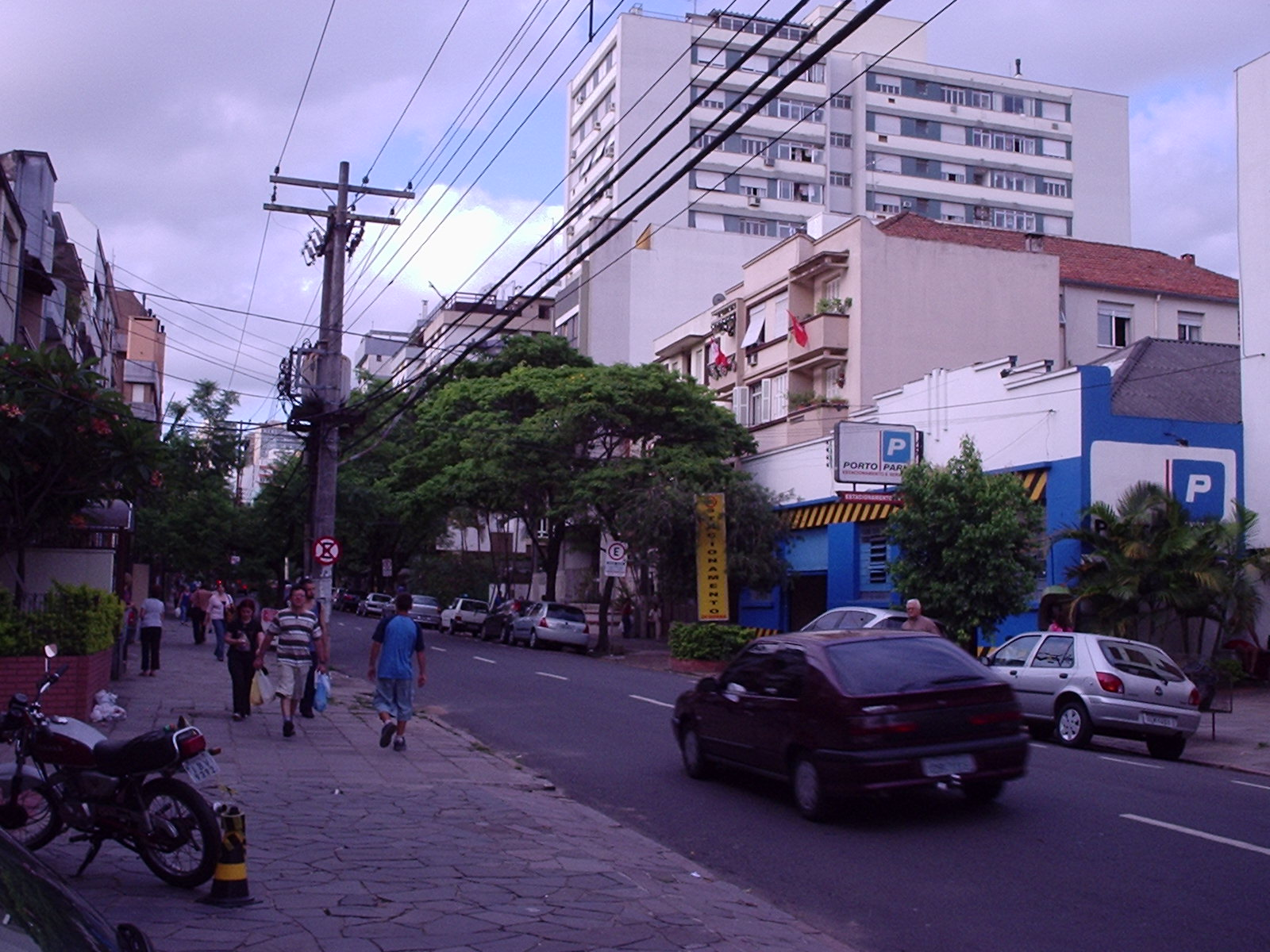
Felipe Camarão Street, in Bom Fim.

Bom Fim (meaning Good End in English) is a neighborhood in the city of Porto Alegre, the state capital of Rio Grande do Sul in Brazil. It was created by the law number 2022 from December 7, 1959.

== History ==
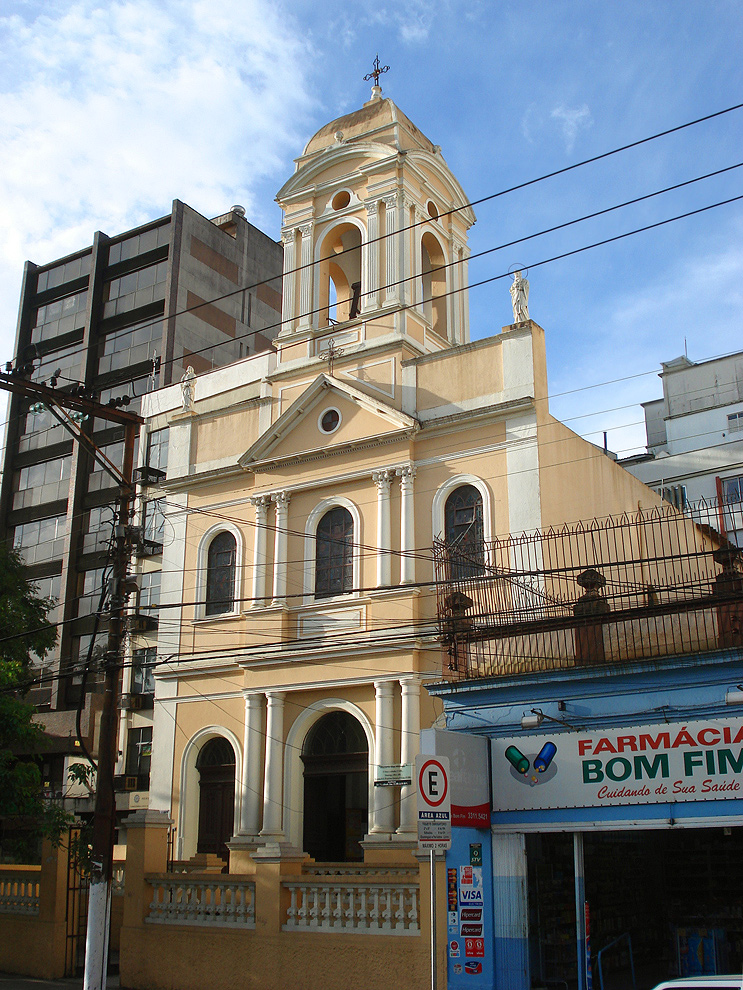
Chapel Our Lord Jesus of Bom Fim, Bom Fim, Porto Alegre - RS, Brail

Bom Fim had its origins in a region commonly known as Campo da Várzea. It was located in a public area of 69 hectares that served as a camp for the carts, carman and where the cattle destined to supply the city remained. Campo da Várzea came to be known as Campos do Bom Fim due to the construction of the Chapel of Our Lord Jesus of Bom Fim, which began in 1867 and completed in 1872.

Until the end of the 19th century there were no major changes to the site. Around the end of the 1920s, the first Jewish immigrants began to settle in the neighborhood, where they built a strong community. The author Moacyr Scliar was raised in the area and wrote a novel about it. "A Guerra no Bom Fim", described the life of the neighborhood's residents at the time of World War II.

Some homes, small shops and workshops started the process of effectively populating the neighborhood. The diversification of this small business accompanied the natural growth of the city, with Bom Fim becoming a residential and commercial district, with emphasis on furniture stores.

The neighborhood houses some historic buildings such as the building of the Italian Society of Rio Grande do Sul, founded in 1893.

Also, there is located a highly-regarded private school of the city, the Projeto school.

== Jewish Heritage ==
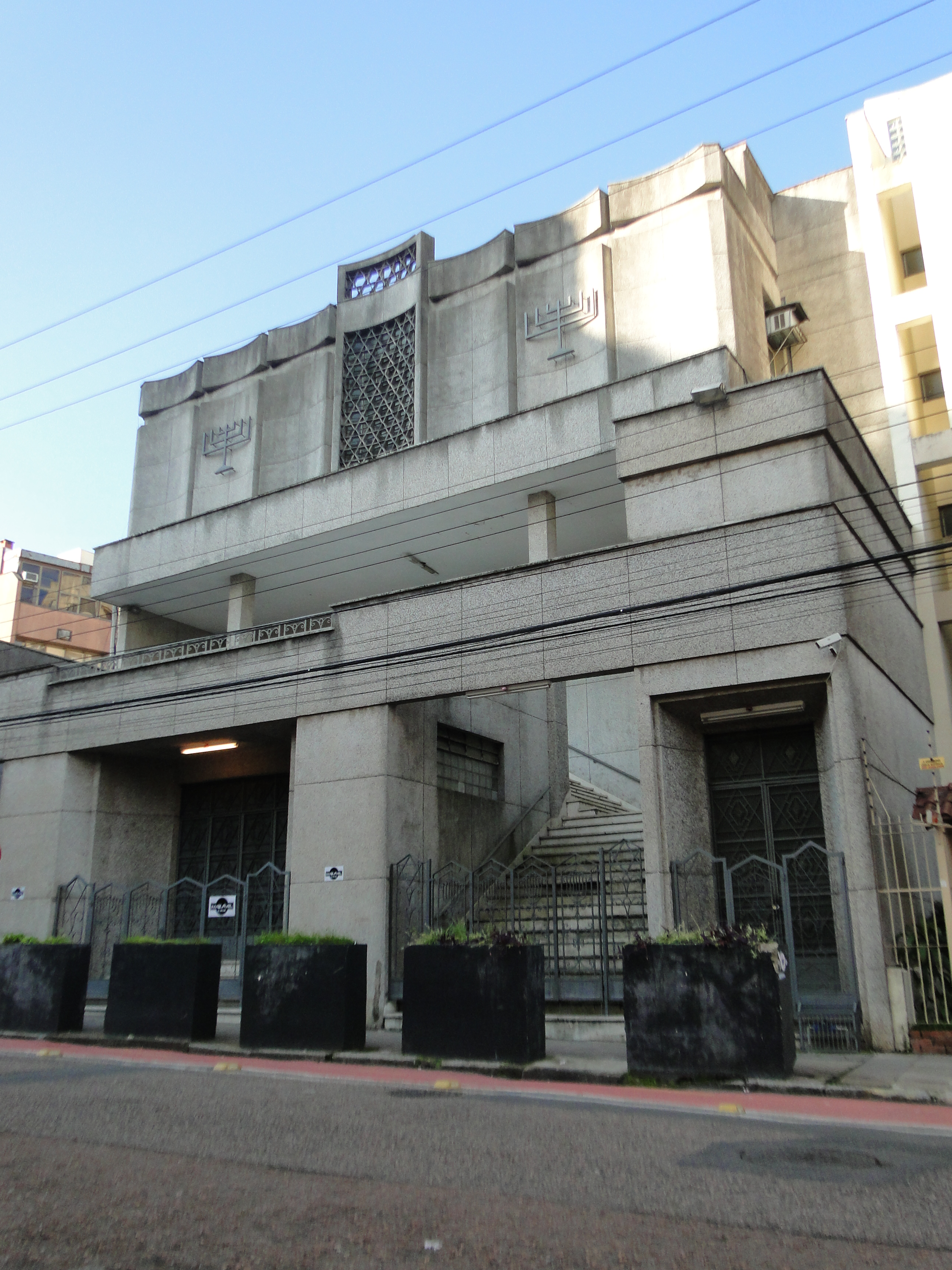
União Israelita Synagogue, Porto Alegre - RS, Brazil

Bom Fim remains a symbol of Jewish heritage in Porto Alegre. There are five synagogues located in the neighborhood: Centro Israelita, Linat Hatzedeck, Beit Lubavitcher, Maurício Cardoso Society (known as the Poilisher Farband) and União Israelita. In addition to the synagogues, there is also the Hebrew Society, the Cultural Club and the Israeli Federation of Rio Grande do Sul (Firgs), which houses the National Museum of Jewish Migrations.

One of the neighborhood's synagogues, União Israelita de Porto Alegre, completed its centenary in 2010 and is one of the oldest in Brazil and also the fourth in the Americas with uninterrupted activities. The synagogue houses relics such as a 350-year-old Torah on a natural scroll and a collection of Talmuds printed in Austria in 1840.

== Modern Characteristics ==
During the week, it is fast-paced neighborhood, mainly close to Oswaldo Aranha Avenue. However, on Saturdays and Sundays it is almost a bucolic neighborhood, with an atmosphere that resembles the country side. Two farmers markets are held weekly in the neighborhood: on Tuesday mornings at João Telles Street and on Saturday afternoons at Irmão José Otão Street. On Saturdays, there is also an ecological market at the edge of Farroupilha Park.

== Popular Sites and Cultural References ==
Frequented by intellectuals and members of alternative and counter-cultural movements, the neighborhood's atmosphere is vibrant and diversified. In or around it are located cafes, bookstores, universities, schools, chapels, synagogues and cultural spaces such as the Italian Society of Rio Grande do Sul. The restaurant Tablado Andaluz, the diner Lancheria do Parque, and the bar Ocidente, the latter being a traditional nightclub and cultural space created in 1980, which hosts concerts, parties, plays and literary soirees. Some traditions are still live in the neighborhood, such as two delicatessens specializing in Kosher products and products for typical Jewish dishes, Sabra and Lechaim. However, traditional spaces were destroyed by real estate speculation such as Cinema Baltimore and Bar João.

The neighborhood is the subject of many cultural pieces such as a documentary directed by Boca Migotto, with its premiered in 2015, which deals with the period in which Bom Fim was the scene of effervescence in cinema, theater and music. The feature film runs from Esquina Maldita, a bohemian stronghold of the 1970s, to the curve of José Bonifácio Avenue, where the Escaler bar was located, frequented by a crowd that gathered there in the 1980s and 1990s and passes through places frequented by different tribes, such as Lola, Bar João, Ocidente, Lancheria do Parque, Baltimore and Bristol cinemas. In addition, music icons such as Kleiton and Kledir, Nei Lisboa and Vitor Ramil have mentioned the neighborhood in their songs.

== Modern Limits ==
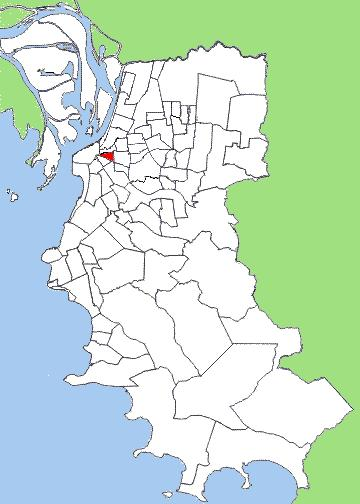
Map of Bom Fim, neighborhood in Porto Alegre, capital of RS, Brazil

Starting and ending point: where Oswaldo Aranha Avenue meets Sarmento Leite Street; from that point, follow Sarmento Leite Street to Irmão José Otão Street, down to Barros Cassal Street; from this point it follows a straight and imaginary line, heading east, until the intersection of Fernandes Vieira Street and Castro Alves Street, along the latter to Ramiro Barcelos Street, circling back to Oswaldo Aranha Avenue.

It is limited by four neighborhoods: Historic District, Farroupilha, Independência and Rio Branco.

== Notable residents ==
- André Damasceno, comedian;
- Charles Master, musician (TNT);
- Flávio Basso, musician (TNT; Os Cascavelletes; Júpiter Maçã);
- Gustavo Brauner, author;
- Moacyr Scliar, author;
- Nei Lisboa, musician;
- Frank Jorge, musician (Os Cascavelletes; Graforréia Xilarmônica);
- Renato Borghetti, musician;
