= Higienópolis (disambiguation) =

Higienópolis is a neighbourhood of São Paulo, Brazil.

Higienópolis may also refer to:

- Higienópolis, Rio de Janeiro, a borough in Rio de Janeiro
- Higienópolis, Rio Grande do Sul, a borough in Porto Alegre
