= 1941 Porto Alegre floods =

Natural disaster in Brazil

In May 1941, the waters surrounding the city of Porto Alegre, Brazil, reached a level of 4.76 meters (16 feet; 190 inches) in height and later flooded the Porto Alegre Public Market, Rua da Praia, and the city center. The flood destroyed a large part of the Riacho Railway, which connected the center with the neighborhoods in the southern city. It led to the canalization of Arroio Dilúvio, which had been started in 1939, by the city government and the federal government.

== Causes ==
The flood was caused by inner-city rainfall and southern winds.

From April to May 1941, part of Guaíba was in intense rainy weather for 22 days. The water from Guaíba drains into the lake, and the flood was later followed by heavy rains and winds. At the time, precipitation totalled 791 millimetres (2.6 ft; 31 in). The recurrence time for this flood is around 370 years.

== Damage and casualties ==
At least one person has drowned in the flood. Early reporting estimated that Porto Alegre had 1,000 houses flooded, with 400 houses underwater in Alegrete. Nearby crops in Cachoeira were damaged, and three farmers committed suicide in the municipality for unknown reasons. In Porto Alegre, around 70,000 people were left homeless out of 270,000 people at the time.

=== Response ===
The American Red Cross allocated US$10,000 to those affected. One bomber flown by R. E. Koon of the United States Army Air Corps flew to the location with US$5,000 worth of serums for the victims. The serum was donated by the American Red Cross and is intended to prevent a potential epidemic hazard that was indirectly caused by the flooding. The serum consists of typhoid antitoxins, diphtheria antitoxins, and anti-dysentery toxin for around 16,000 people.

In 1971–1974, in response to the flood, the Mauá Wall was built by the Departamento Nacional de Obras e Saneamento (DNOS).

== See also ==
- 2024 Rio Grande do Sul floods
- 2023 Rio Grande do Sul floods
