= Jardim Botânico =

Jardim Botânico, Portuguese for botanical garden, may refer to:

== Botanical gardens ==
- Jardim Botânico do Rio de Janeiro, the Portuguese name for the Rio de Janeiro Botanical Garden in Rio de Janeiro, Brazil
- Jardim Botânico da Universidade de Coimbra, the Portuguese name for the Botanical Garden of the University of Coimbra in Coimbra, Portugal
- Jardim Botânico do Funchal, a botanical garden in Funchal, Madeira, Portugal
- Jardim Botânico de Lisboa, a botanical garden in Lisbon, Portugal
- Jardim Botânico (Cape Verde), a botanical garden in São Jorge dos Órgãos, Cape Verde
- Jardim Botânico de Curitiba, the Portuguese name for the Botanical Garden of Curitiba in Curitiba, Brazil
- Jardim Botânico do Porto, a botanical garden in Porto, Portugal
- Jardim Botânico do Faial, the Portuguese name for the Botanical Garden of Faial on Faial, Portugal

== Places ==
- Jardim Botânico, Federal District
- Jardim Botânico, Rio de Janeiro, a residential neighborhood in Rio de Janeiro, Brazil
- Jardim Botânico, Rio Grande do Sul, a residential neighborhood in Porto Alegre, Brazil

== See also ==
- Botanical garden
