= Três Figueiras =

Neighbourhood in Porto Alegre, Brazil

Coordinates: 30°02′01″S 51°10′20″W

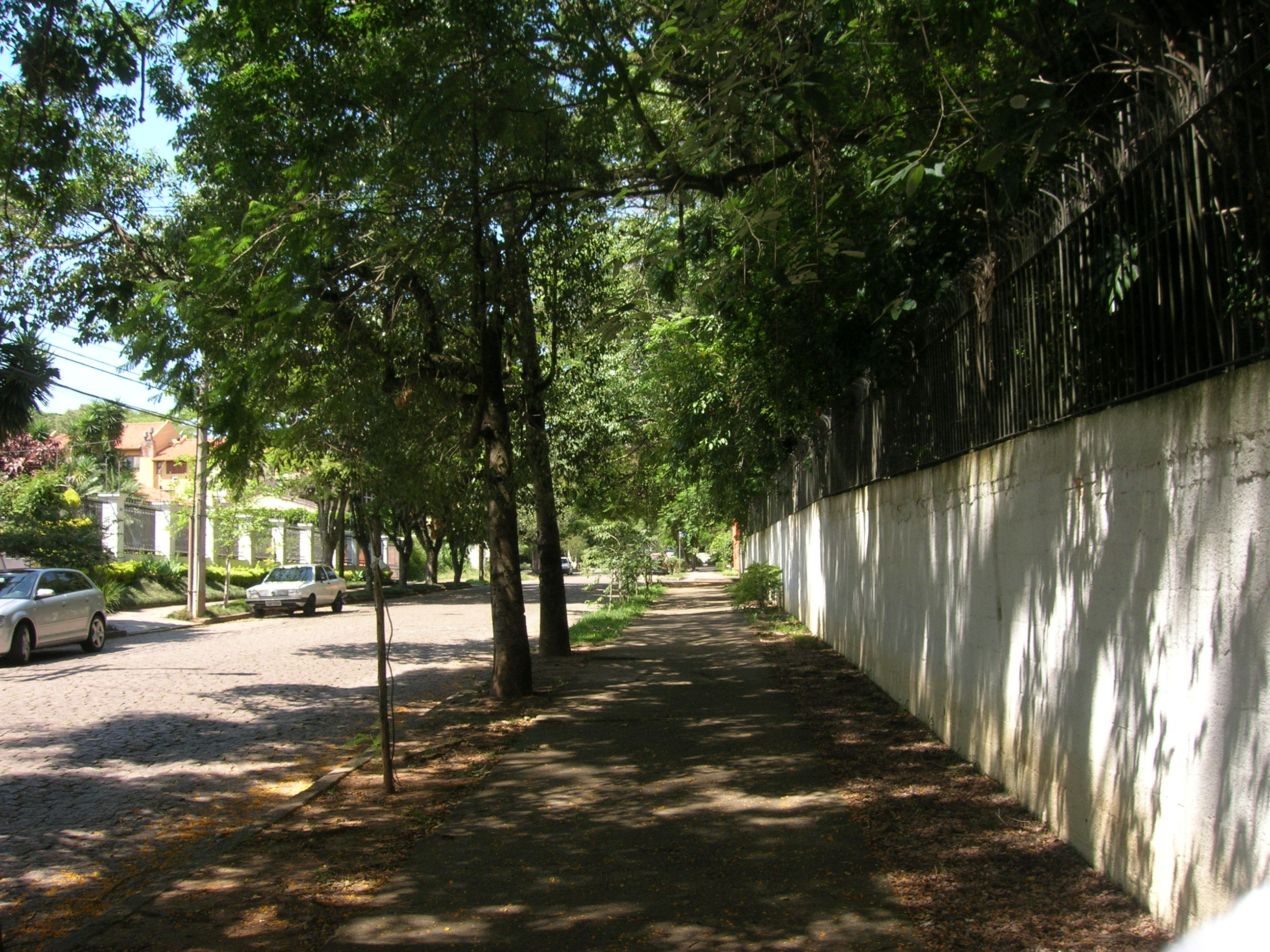
Luiz Manoel Gonzaga avenue in Três Figueiras.

Três Figueiras (meaning Three Fig Trees in Portuguese) is a neighbourhood of the city of Porto Alegre, the state capital of Rio Grande do Sul, Brazil. A residential neighbourhood, it embrace people from upper middle class to upper class, having many sophisticated houses. Três Figueiras was created by Law 2022 of December 7, 1959. There is located the Design School of Unisinos. Also, there has two highly regarded and traditional private schools, the Farroupilha and Anchieta schools, and a highly regarded private school for childhood, the Baby House.

== See also ==
- Neighborhoods of Porto Alegre
