= Boa Vista, Rio Grande do Sul =

Boa Vista
- Bairro
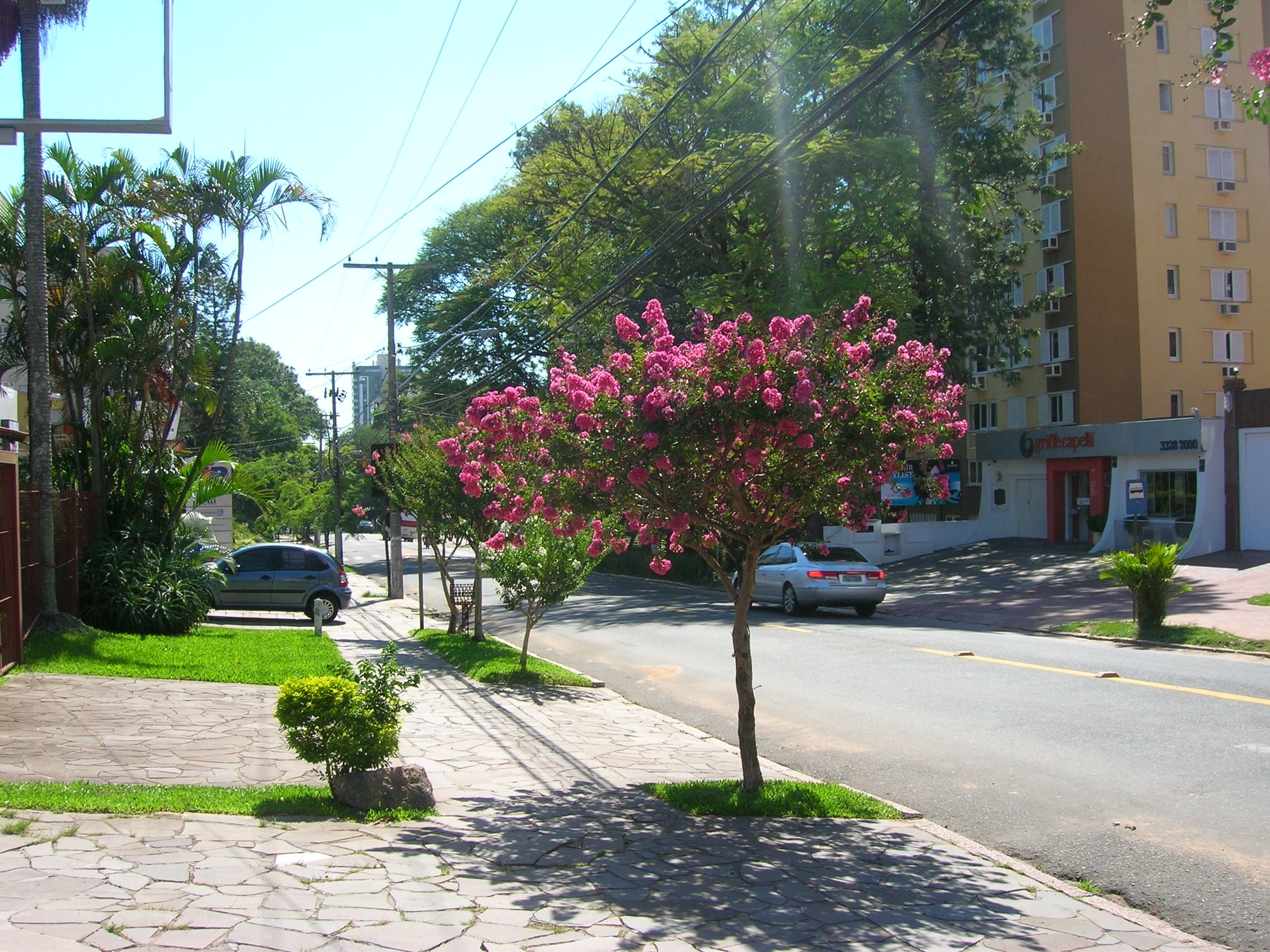
- Anita Garibaldi Street.

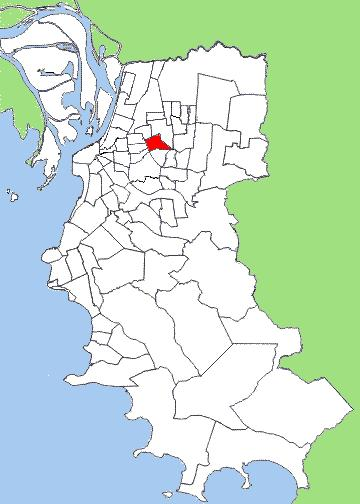
- Boa Vista within Porto Alegre
- Country: Brazil
- State: Rio Grande do Sul
- City: Porto Alegre

Boa Vista (meaning "Good View" in Portuguese) is a neighbourhood of the city of Porto Alegre, the state capital of Rio Grande do Sul, Brazil. It was created by the municipal law 2.022 from December 7, 1959.

In 2000, there were 8,691 people living in Boa Vista.

== History ==
Boa Vista became a noble residential neighbourhood in the 1960s. The first and oldest houses were constructed around the Japan Square (Praça do Japão in Portuguese), which is located in an upland area. From the 1990s onwards, however, some of these residences became commercial establishments, such as stores, cafés, restaurants, and law firms. Other houses were demolished and apartment buildings were built instead. The most important street in Boa Vista is Anita Garibaldi Street.

In the neighbourhood there are two private schools, Monteiro Lobato and Província de São Pedro, founded in 1971 and 1979, respectively. Near them is the only public school in Boa Vista, Escola Estadual de Ensino Fundamental Bahia. Moreover, there are two well-known social and sports clubs: the Porto Alegre Country Club, with a 50-hectare area, and the Lebanese Society (Sociedade Libanesa).

== See also ==
- Neighborhoods of Porto Alegre
