= Colégio Farroupilha =

Colegio Farroupilha

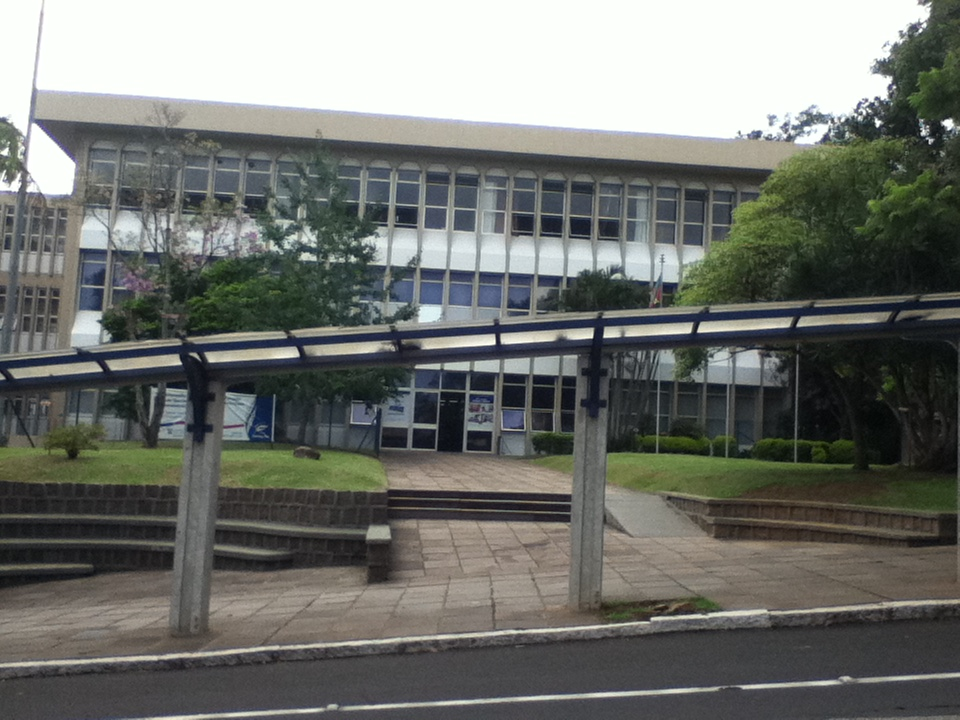

Location
- 425 Carlos Hueber Street; Porto Alegre, Rio Grande do Sul; Brazil
- Coordinates: 30.0349°S 51.1718°W

Information
- Type: Independent School
- Established: 1886
- Founder: Deutscher Hilfsverein
- Gender: Coeducational
- Website: www.colegiofarroupilha.com.br

Colégio Farroupilha (Farroupilha Elementary, Middle and High School in English) is one of the most traditional private schools in Porto Alegre and in Brazil. It has ranked at the top 1% of schools in Brazil for as long as the ENEM (National High School Exam) ranking has existed.

== History ==
The Colégio Farroupilha was founded in 1886 by the Deutscher Hilfsverein, a beneficent association created to help the German-Brazilian immigrants and their descendants. The school's first name was Knabenschule des Deutschen Hilfsvereins. At that time, classes were taught in rooms rented from the evangelical community in downtown Porto Alegre, and only boys were accepted as pupils.

In 1895, the first building of the school was inaugurated, located in the São Rafael Street (now Alberto Bins Avenue). In this area, Plaza São Rafael is now installed, a Five-Star hotel. The Girls School begun operating officially in 1904. In 1911, the kindergarten was created, and it became the first in the state of Rio Grande do Sul and the third one in Brazil.

In 1962, due to the growing number of students, the school was transferred to a new building, constructed on a land purchased by the beneficent association in 1928. The place was known as Chácara das Três Figueiras and the local neighborhood was named after it.
