= Guasca Rugby Clube =

Guasca
- Full name: Guasca Rugby Clube
- Union: Brazilian Rugby Confederation; Gaúcho Rugby Federation
- Founded: September 20, 2012
- Region: Porto Alegre, RS, Brazil
- Ground(s): Soccer Field of Marinha do Brasil Park
- President: (Brazil) Leonardo Vidal
- Coach(es): (Brazil) Paulo Barbosa Jr.
- Captain(s): (Brazil) Bruno Nunes (Brazil) Guilherme Silva
- League(s): (Rio Grande do Sul) Gaúcho 3rd Division
1st kit	2nd kit

Official website
- www.guascarugby.com

Guasca Rugby Clube is a Brazilian Rugby Union club from the city of Porto Alegre, Rio Grande do Sul. Guasca was founded on September 20, 2012.

== History ==
The Guasca Rugby Clube was born as an idea on September 20, 2012, in Porto Alegre, with the premise of creating a club strongly orientated to keep alive the values of rugby, and aiming to be a different club organization, structure and development of new players in Rio Grande do Sul the first board of directors has Leonardo Vidal as president, as Guilherme Silva as managing director and Paulo Barbosa Jr. as Technical Director.

The badge is made with the club's colors, gold and black, featuring the gaucho holding the "boleadera" (traditional gaucho hunting weapon). "Sou bagual que não se entrega assim no más" verse immortalized in the song 'Veterano' by Leopoldo Rassier, is the battle cry of the club that is hailed the end of each practice session and at the beginning and end of their games, meaning 'I am a warrior who never give up' using local and informal terms.

On March 17, 2013, the club held its first match in a friendly against Plananlto Rugby Clube from the city of Passo Fundo. The match was held at Universidade Federal do Rio Grande do Sul in Porto Alegre. The second game was on April 6, 2013, a friendly against Pampas Rugby Clube, the game was held at the Parque do Trabalhador in the city of São Leopoldo.

The first competition to be played by the club was Torneio Pré Gauchão de Rugby, which was held on April 21, 2013, and organized by the Guaíba Rugby Clube, with the support of the Gaucho Rugby Federation and the Municipal Sport and Youth of the Municipality Guaiba . The club became champion of this competition that year was played in the format Rugby Union.

== Presidential management ==
- Leonardo Vidal (2012-current)

== Main Titles ==
Males

- Torneio Pré Gauchão de Rugby Champion once (2013)
