= Marinha do Brasil Park =

Urban park in Porto Alegre, Brazil

Coordinates: 30°03′25″S 51°13′56″W

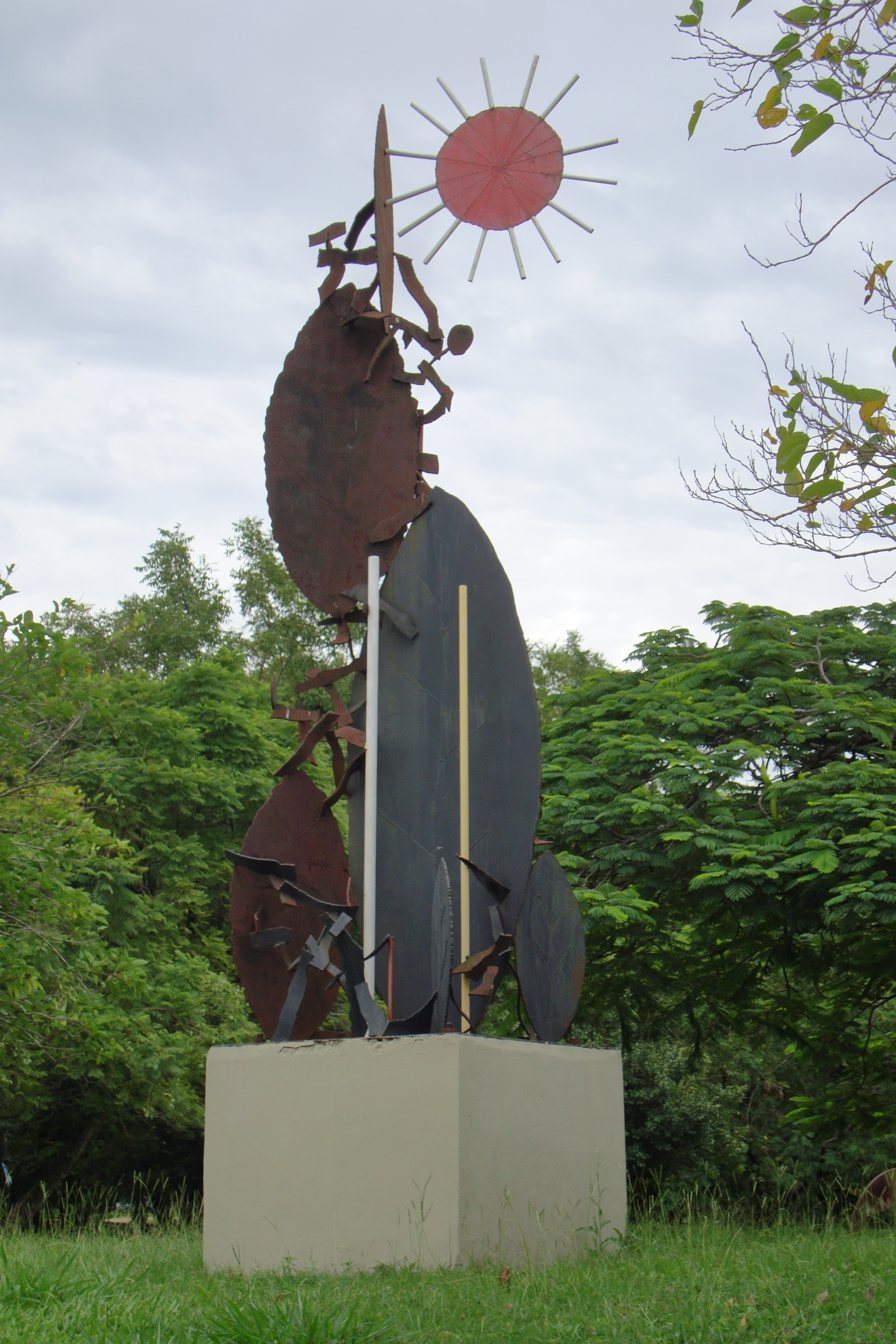
Sculpture in Parque Marinha do Brasil, by Francisco Stockinger.

Marinha do Brasil Park is an urban park located in the city of Porto Alegre, the state capital of Rio Grande do Sul, Brazil. It was inaugurated on December 9, 1978, on 70,7 hectares of city-owned land. It is located in Praia de Belas neighbourhood.

== See also ==
- Guasca Rugby Clube
