= Joaquim Felizardo Museum of Porto Alegre =

Historical museum in Brazil

- Museu de Porto Alegre Joaquim Felizardo
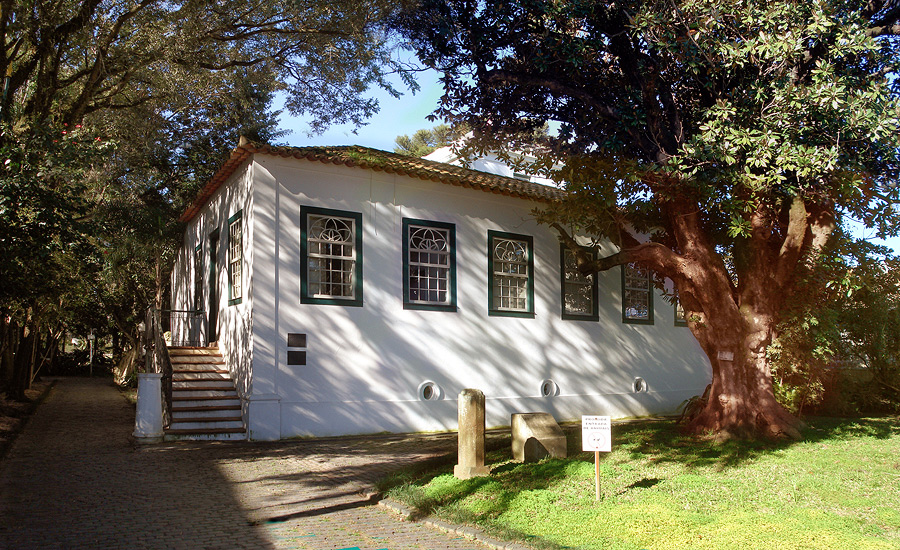
- Location: Porto Alegre, Rio Grande do Sul, Brazil
- Coordinates: 30°2′31.345″S 51°13′29.732″W
- Type: Historical
- Website: https://www.museudeportoalegre.com/

The Joaquim Felizardo Museum of Porto Alegre (Portuguese: Museu de Porto Alegre Joaquim Felizardo) is a historical museum in the city of Porto Alegre, capital of the Brazilian state of Rio Grande do Sul. It is installed at Lopo Gonçalves Manor House, located at 582 João Alfredo Street.

== History ==
Lopo Gonçalves Manor House, also known as Magnolia Manor House, was built between 1845 and 1853 on a farm on Margem Street (currently João Alfredo Street), in the Cidade Baixa neighborhood, to serve as the summer residence of Lopo Gonçalves Bastos' family.

Lopo Gonçalves, besides having kept several commerce businesses in the city, was also an alderman of Porto Alegre for two mandates, staying as a substitute in a third period. The Manor House was his summer home, since the Cidade Baixa neighborhood, in the 19th century, was outside the urban limits of the city, being considered a rural area. After his death, in 1872, and that of his wife in 1876, the property was inherited by his daughter, Maria Luisa Gonçalves Bastos, and her spouse, Joaquim Gonçalves Bastos Monteiro, Lopo's nephew and also a merchant. During this period, the Manor House became the family's permanent residence, and was expanded and remodeled by Maria Luísa: a small internal patio was built, a turret was added, and an old room was demolished.

For some time, researchers believed that the high basement served as a senzala for the slaves of the Bastos family. However, after recent research and cross-referencing of information with other Portuguese-Brazilian architectural works, it is believed today that the high basement served to preserve the house in case of inundation, since the area of the city where the Manor House is located was flooded. Possibly, the enslaved stayed at the house, both those who worked with domestic chores during the day, and the others, connected to rural work on the property. However, this type of organization could be much more oppressive for enslaved workers, since it greatly increases the masters' surveillance over their activities, decreasing the possibilities of articulation among them. Another factor that reinforces this hypothesis is the fact that Lopo only owned 14 slaves, a number that specialists consider low to justify the use of a senzala. The third element concerns the very concept of the senzala, which is always a separate structure from the house and aims to preserve the "intimacy and daily life" of the slave-owning whites.

As the city's urbanization progressed, the land was reduced in size. In 1946, the Manor House was acquired by businessman and lawyer Albano José Volkmer, who, along with his family, owned a candle factory downtown, and housed relatives in several rooms of the new house, now divided into three housing units. In 1966, the Service of Assistance and Social Security of Economists (SASSE) acquired the property to build a residential nucleus for its associates. In order to do so, SASSE asked the City Hall to demolish the Manor House and open a road that would divide the property, which was denied by the General Plan Council and the Urbanism Division.

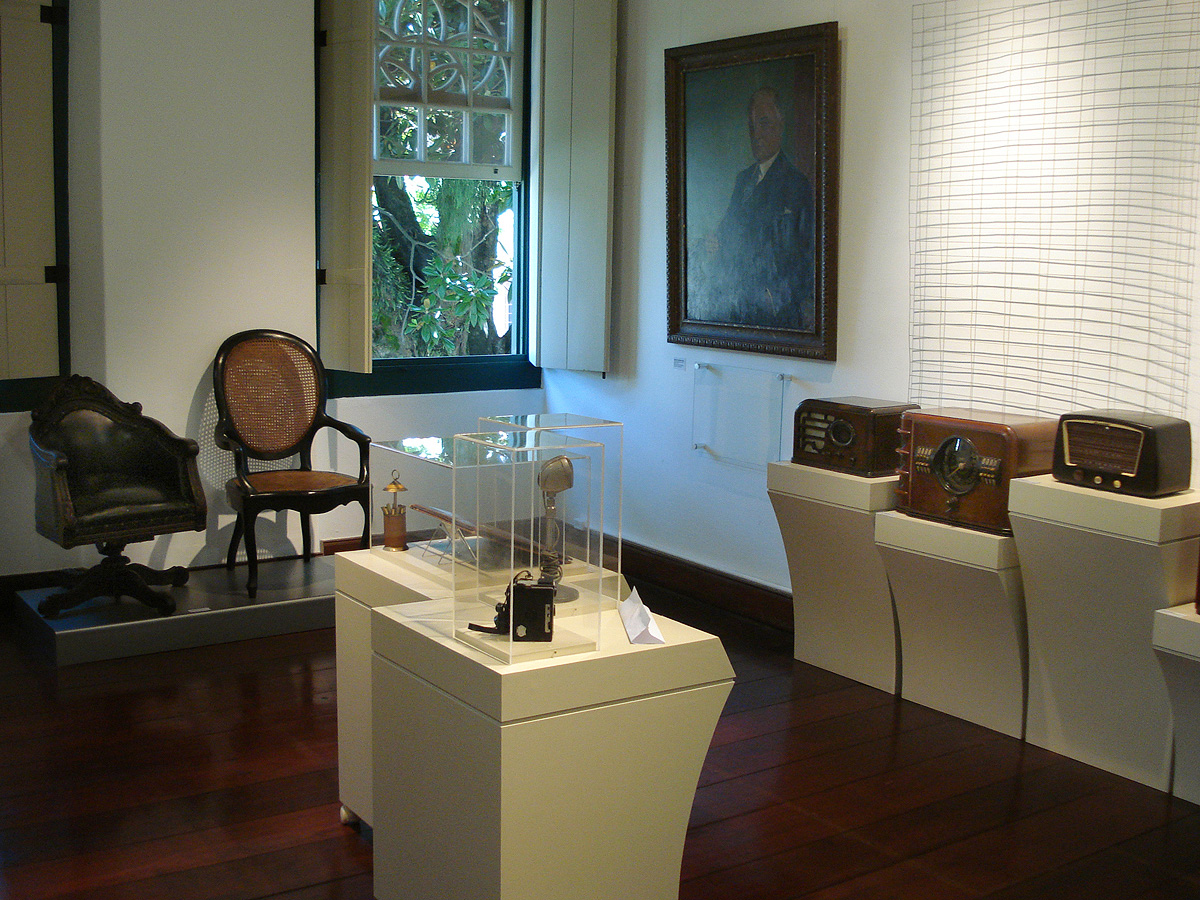
One of the exhibition rooms.

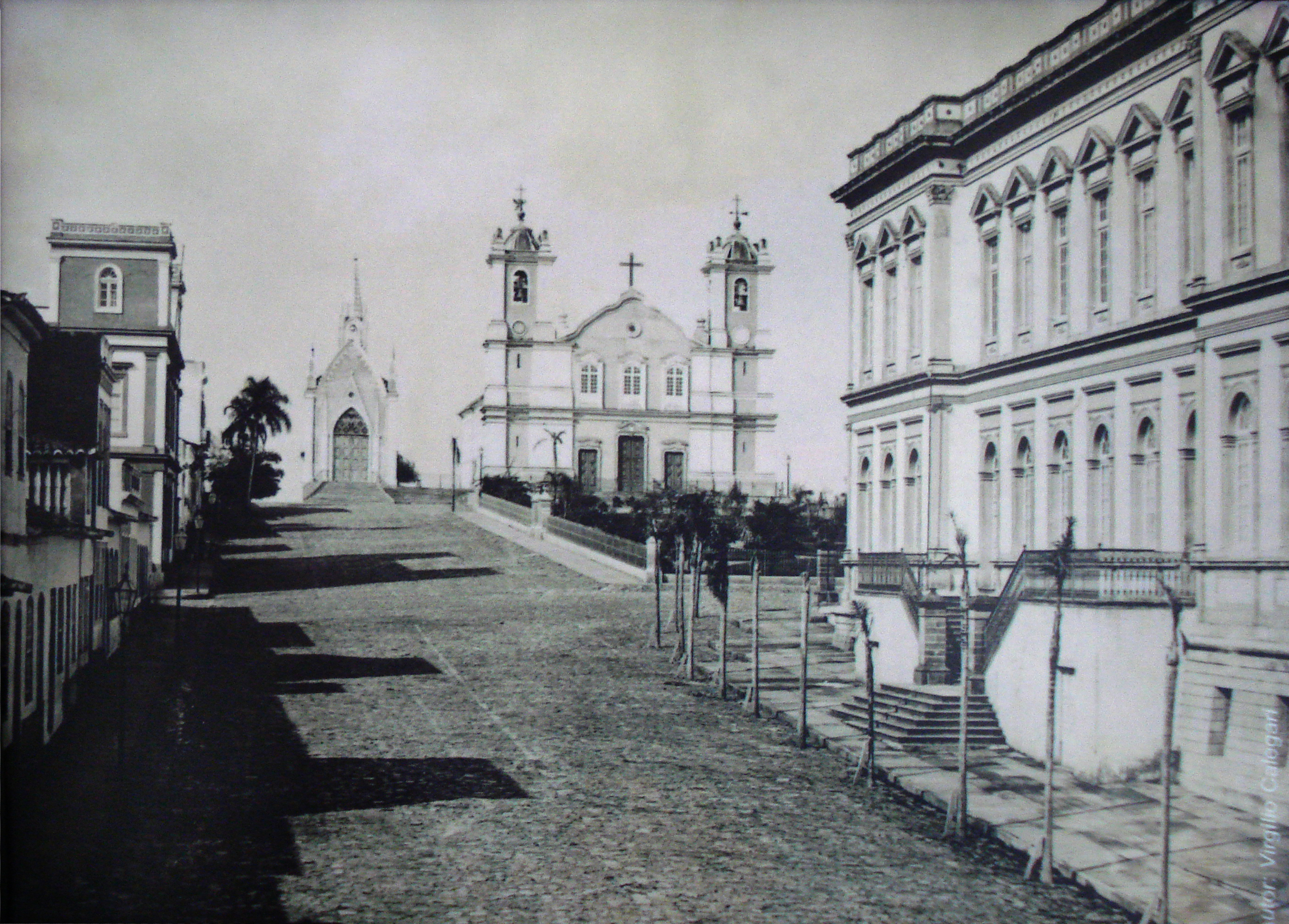
Old photo of the Mother Church Square, from the museum's collection.

During SASSE's ownership of the Manor House, there was an abdication of architectural care and maintenance with the building, which severely damaged its structure. Under these conditions, the building had been occupied by people who could not afford to afford living in other areas of the city. Therefore, for a few years, the Manor House hosted a kind of tenement. With the Extinction of SASSE and its redefinition to IAPAS (Institute of Financial Administration of Social Security and Assistance), the administration of the building changed, with an exchange of the Manor House between the City Hall and IAPAS.

Since 1974, the building's status has changed due to its inclusion in an inventory of buildings of historical and cultural value in the city, which was an autonomous initiative of the incipient preservationist movement in Porto Alegre. At the time, the situation of the poor installations was taken to the local press by some members of the preservationist movement and, in 1978, a commission coordinated by historian and university professor Moacyr Flores was formed to transform the Manor House into the Porto Alegre Museum, which was temporarily located at 291 Lobo da Costa Street. The project was approved after pressure from intellectuals, preservationists, professors, and organized civil society; in 1979, the property was listed as a heritage building and, in 1980, the Secretariat of Education and Culture (at the time, SMEC) took on the responsibility of executing the project. The restoration took place between 1980 and 1982, under the guidance of architect Nestor Torelly Martins, and was carried out by the Knorr company. At the end of the restoration, the City Hall collection, which was the responsibility of historian Walter Spalding, was transferred to the Museum, and is still there today.

Originally called Museum of Porto Alegre, it had its name changed to Joaquim José Felizardo Museum of Porto Alegre by municipal law of December 23, 1993, in order to honor Joaquim Felizardo, historian and creator of the Municipal Department of Culture. He was a professor of basic education and university education, teaching history, and was politically persecuted during the civil-military dictatorship in Brazil, being punished in 1968 by AI-1 and AI-5, when he was arbitrarily expelled and detained. With the democratization, he returns to public life.

The museum underwent another restoration, and was reopened on December 17, 2007.

== Infrastructure ==
The museum houses the Sioma Breitman Photo Library, whose collection covers about a century and is composed of about 9,000 photos, all digitalized, that constitute the museum's Image Bank, which provides the public the possibility of conducting research in a self-service system through computers. It also presents the long term exhibition entitled Transformações Urbanas: Porto Alegre de Montaury a Loureiro (English: Urban Transformations: Porto Alegre from Montaury to Loureiro), telling the story of the first urban development plans and the main works carried out in Porto Alegre between 1897 and 1943.

The museum also has an archeological collection with more than 180,000 pieces of evidence and miniatures of old Azorean houses. It holds temporary exhibitions, promotes courses, debates, workshops, and other cultural activities.

== See also ==
- Architecture of Porto Alegre
- History of Porto Alegre
