= Presidente Castelo Branco, Santa Catarina =

Presidente Castelo Branco
- Municipality
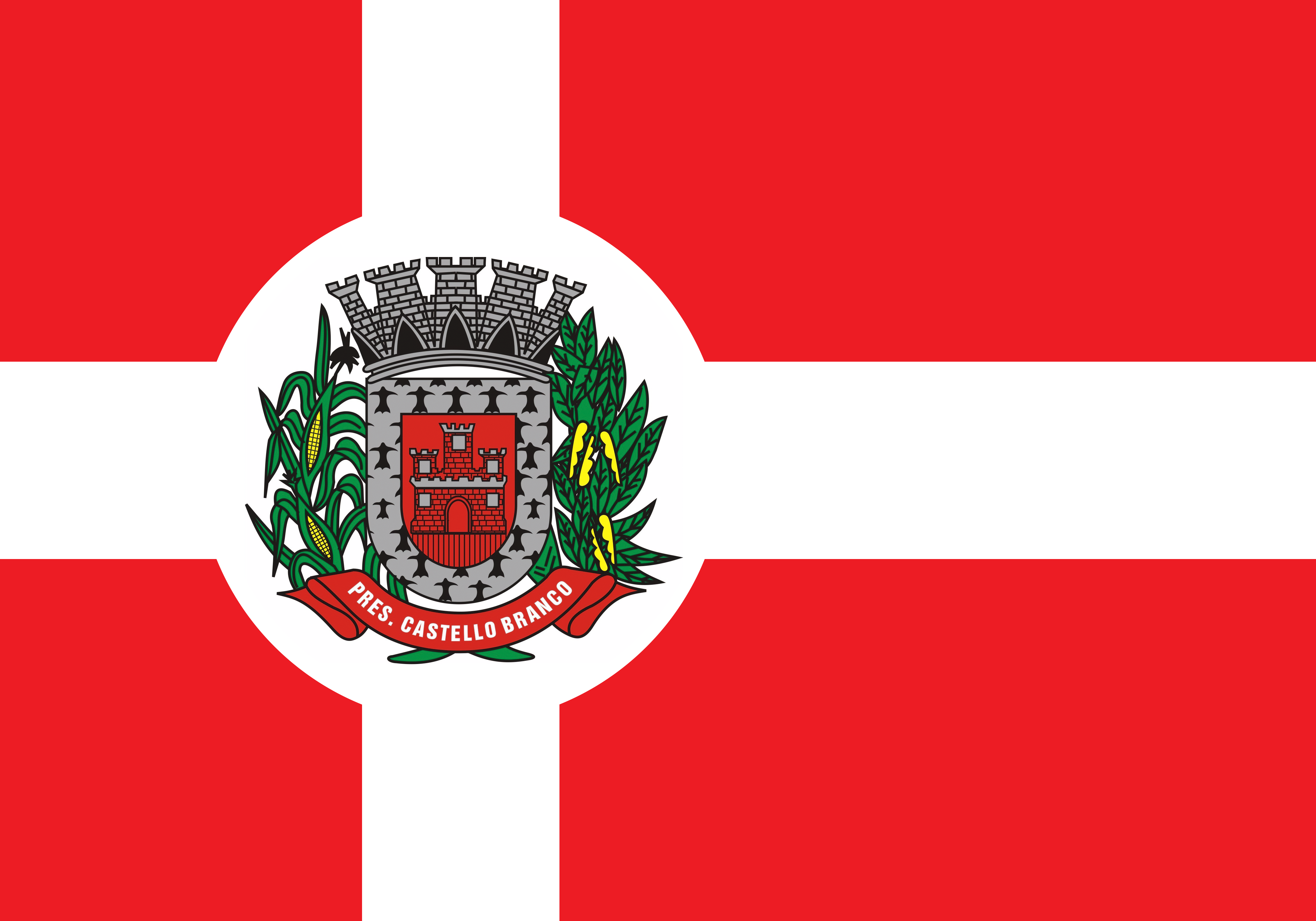
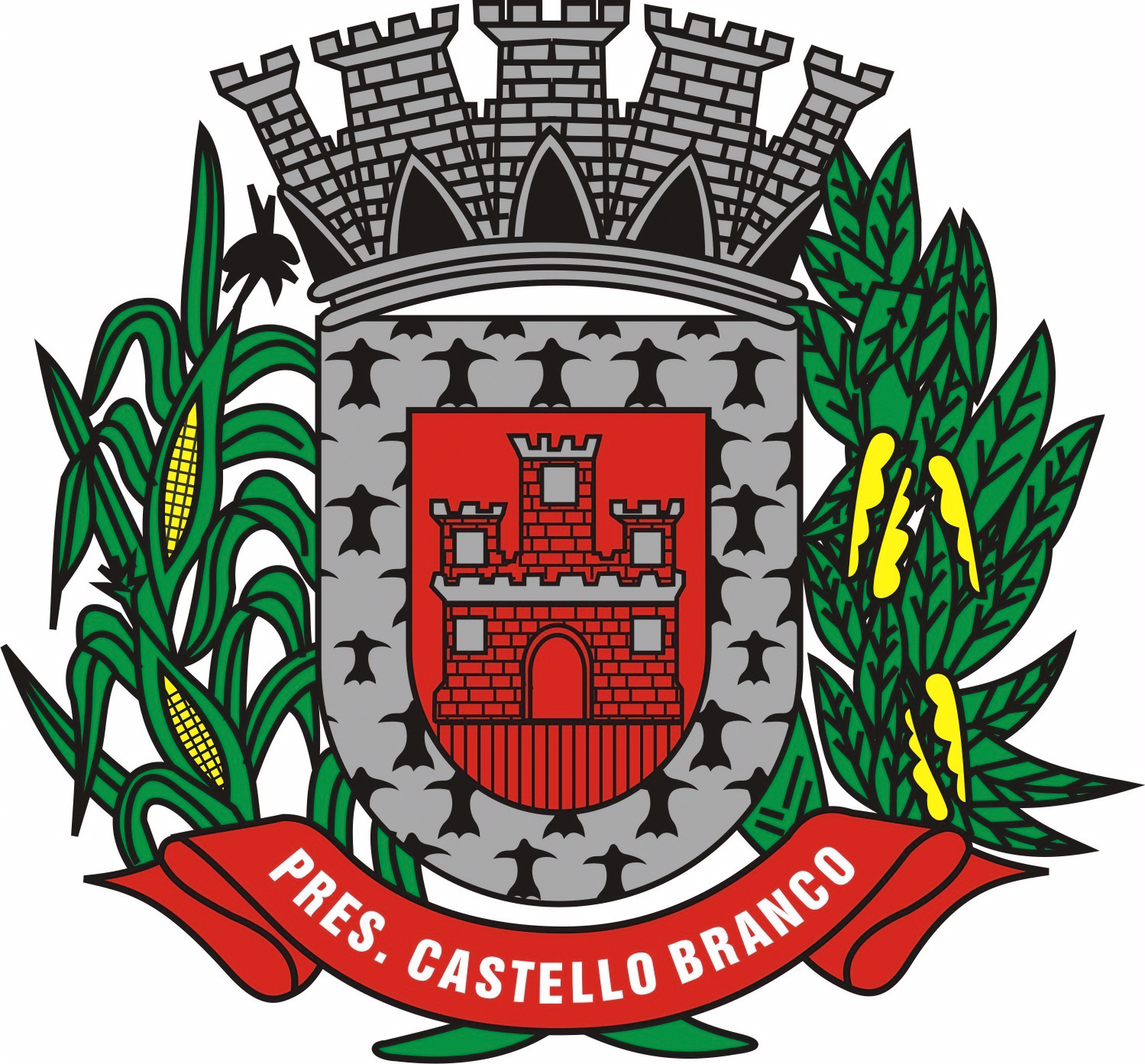
- Flag Coat of arms

- Location in Brazil
- Coordinates: 27°13′22″S 51°48′25″W
- Country: Brazil
- Region: South
- State: Santa Catarina
- Mesoregion: Oeste Catarinense

Government
  - Mayor: Ademir Domingos Mioto

Area
  - Total: 25.330 sq mi (65.605 km^{2})
- Elevation: 2,130 ft (650 m)

Population (2020)
  - Total: 1,547
  - Density: 61.07/sq mi (23.58/km^{2})
- Time zone: UTC -3
- Website: www.castellobranco.sc.gov.br

Presidente Castelo Branco is a municipality in the state of Santa Catarina in the South region of Brazil.

== See also ==
- List of municipalities in Santa Catarina
