= Santa Cecília, Porto Alegre =

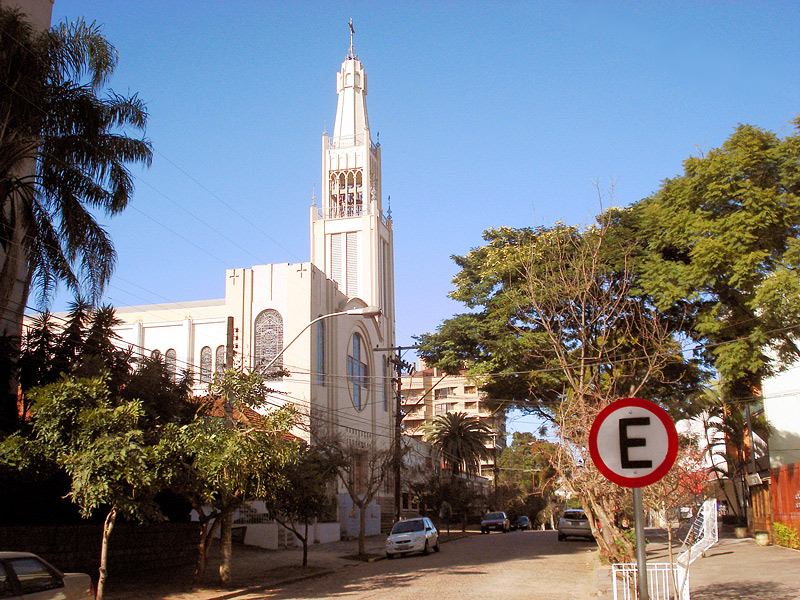
The Igreja de Santa Cecília.

Santa Cecília is a neighbourhood (bairro) in the city of Porto Alegre, the state capital of Rio Grande do Sul, Brazil. It was created by Law 2022 from December 7, 1959.

Santa Cecília is home to the Campus Saúde (meaning Health Campus) of the Federal University of Rio Grande do Sul, which contains the Faculties of Medicine, Nursing, Psychiatry, Odontology and Pharmacy buildings, as well as the Hospital de Clínicas de Porto Alegre.
