= Jardim Isabel =

Coordinates: 30°07′36″S 51°14′08″W

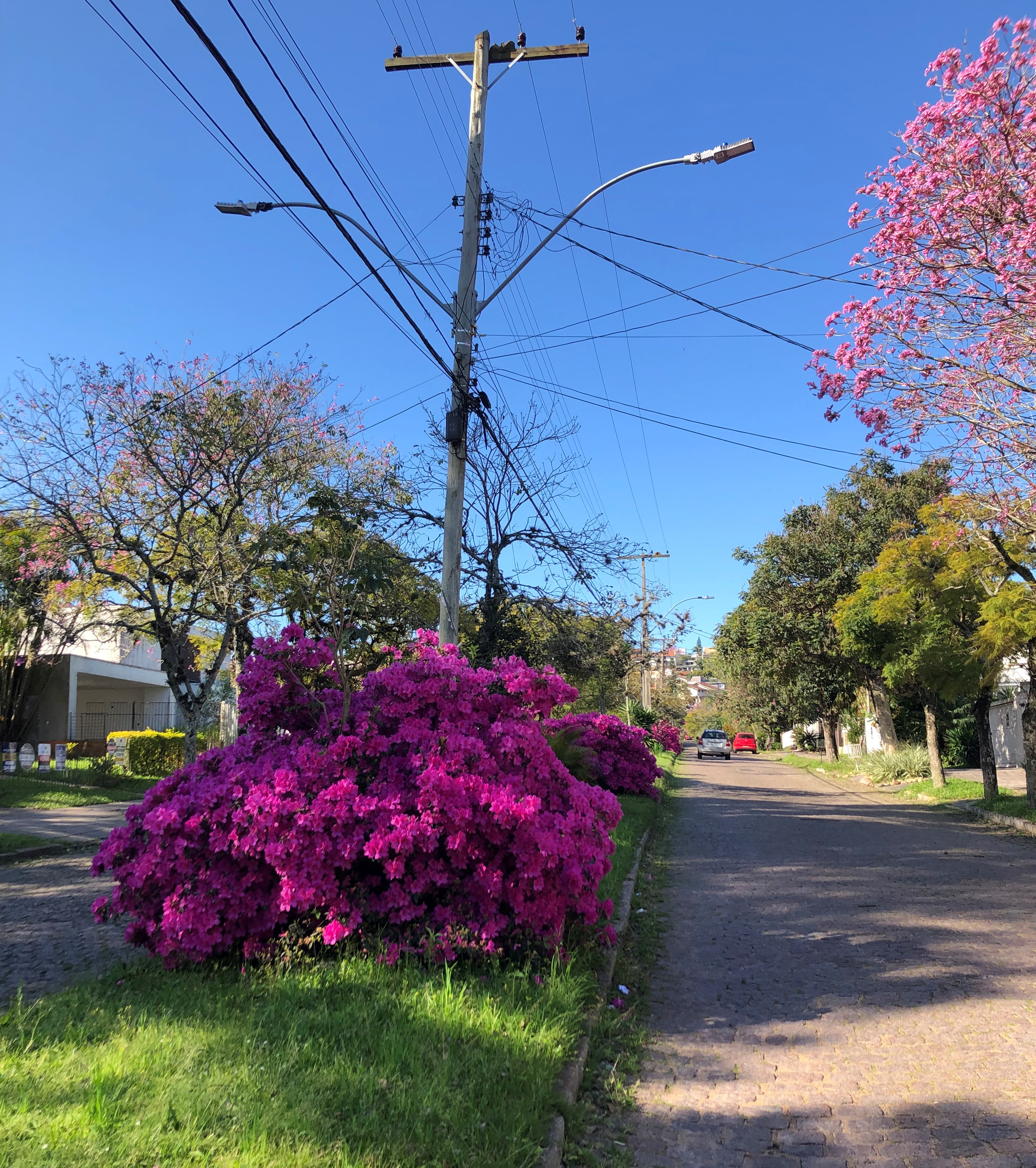
Avenida Arlindo Pasqualini, in bairro Jardim Isabel.

Jardim Isabel is a neighbourhood (bairro) in the city of Porto Alegre, the state capital of Rio Grande do Sul, in Brazil. It was created by Law 10724 from July 9, 2009, being the newest official neighbourhood in town.

It embraces people from upper middle class to upper class.

Also, a highly regarded private school of the city, the João Paulo I school, is located in Jardim Isabel.
