= Rio Branco, Rio Grande do Sul =

Neighbourhood in Porto Alegre, Brazil

Rio Branco (literally White River in English) is a neighbourhood (bairro) of the city of Porto Alegre, the state capital of Rio Grande do Sul, in Brazil. It was created by Law 2022 from December 7, 1959.

Rio Branco was initially called Colônia Africana (or African Colony), because it became a favela after the abolition of slavery in 1888. However, a process of reurbanization was implemented in the area during the 1920s, and authorities banished former slaves and their families. Subsequently, the neighbourhood was named in honour of the Baron of Rio Branco and became home to upper and middle-class people.

The IPA (acronym to Instituto Porto Alegre (in English: Porto Alegre Institute) Methodist University Center, founded in 1971, is located there. Also, there is located a highly regarded private school of the city, the Leonardo da Vinci school.

== Famous residents ==
- Tarso Genro, Governor of Rio Grande do Sul
