= Praia de Belas =

Neighborhood of Porto Alegre, Brazil

Coordinates: 30°02′48″S 51°13′54″W

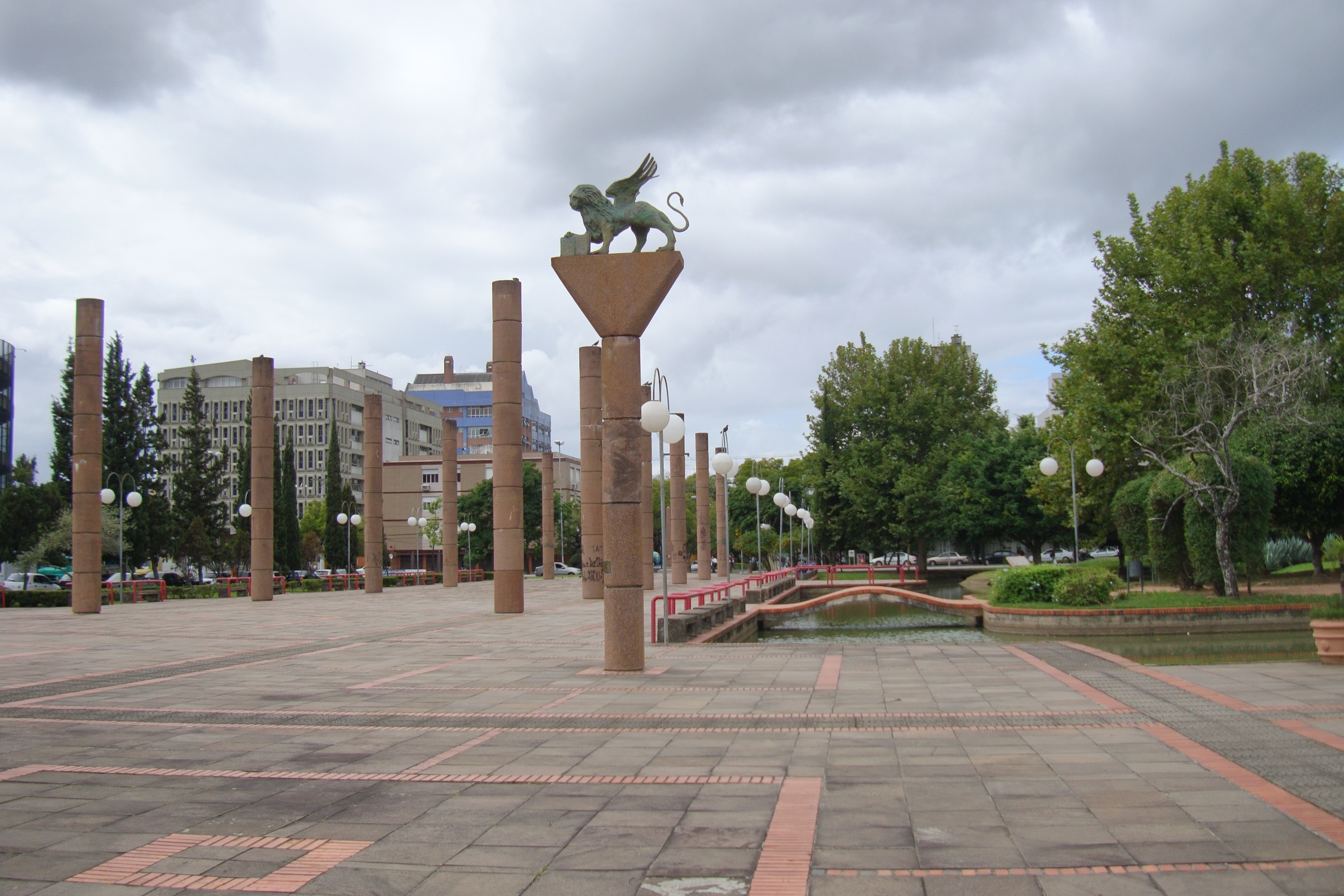
Praça Itália.

Praia de Belas is a neighborhood of the city of Porto Alegre, the state capital of Rio Grande do Sul, Brazil. It was created by Law 2022 from December 7, 1959.

Close to Porto Alegre downtown, Praia de Belas was named after the farmer Antônio Rodrigues de Belas, who constructed a road for the slave trade in 1839, today known as Praia de Belas avenue. The number of dwellers begun to grow when a stone quay was built in 1870, and thus the political authorities decided to expand its area. In 1960, a big portion of Guaíba Lake was covered with landfill and enabled the planned urbanization process. Since then it has been home to innumerable government and public buildings, such as courthouses: the Administrative Centre of Rio Grande do Sul is located here, as well as many courthouses. Moreover, there are two parks in Praia Belas: the Marinha do Brasil Park and Maurício Sirotski Sobrinho Park.

Also, there is located a highly regarded private school of the city, the Maria Imaculada school.

== Demographics ==
- Population: 1.869 (in 2000)
- Area: 204 ha
- Density: 9 hab/ha/km^{2}
- Number of housing units: 745

== See also ==
- Neighborhoods of Porto Alegre
