= Santana, Rio Grande do Sul =

Neighbourhood in Porto Alegre, Brazil

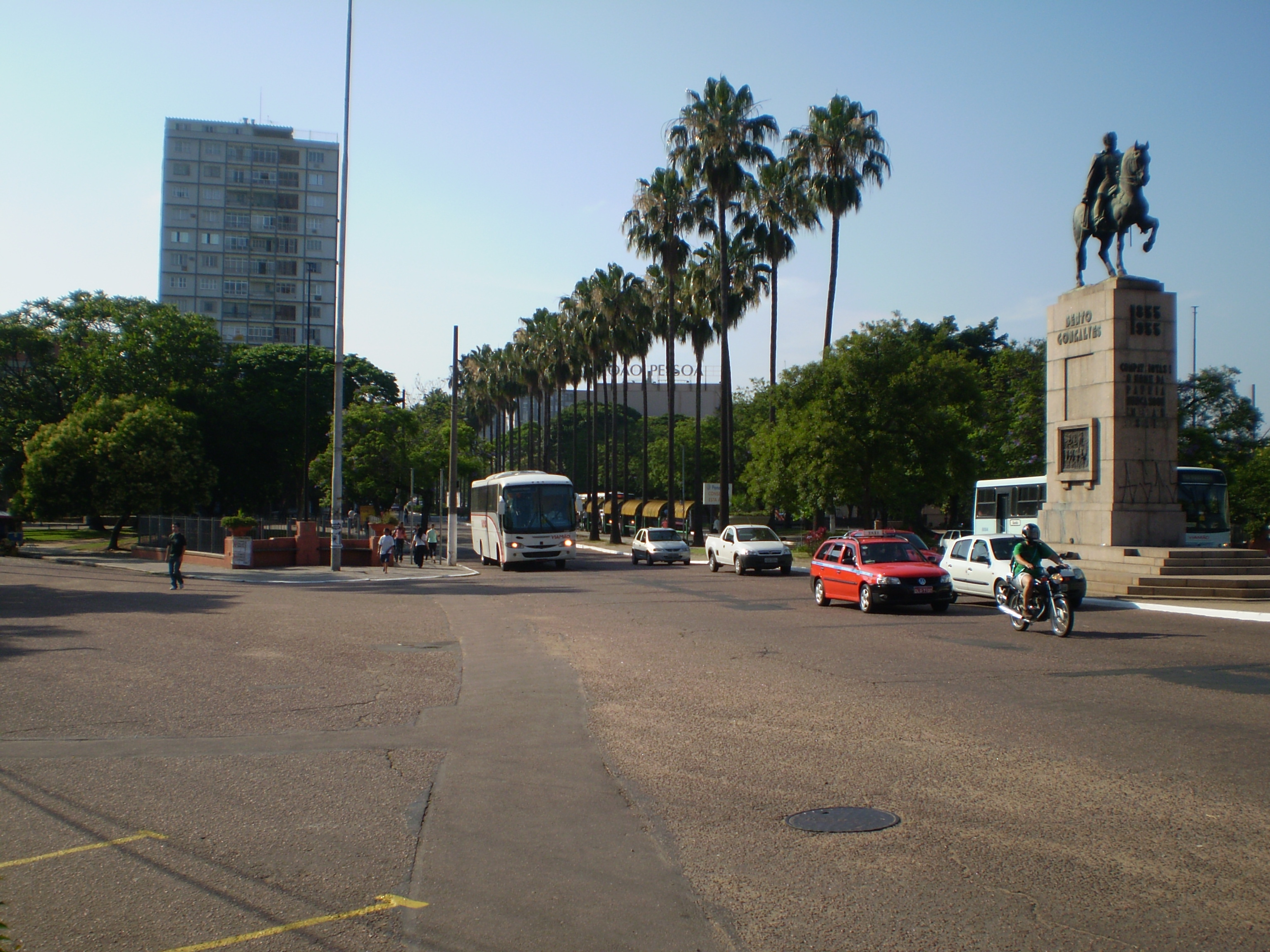
João Pessoa avenue.

Santana (meaning Saint Anne in Portuguese) is a neighbourhood in the city of Porto Alegre, the state capital of Rio Grande do Sul, Brazil. It was created by Law 2022 from December 7, 1959.
