= Azenha =

Neighbourhood in Porto Alegre

Coordinates: 30°03′02″S 51°12′52″W

- Neighbourhood
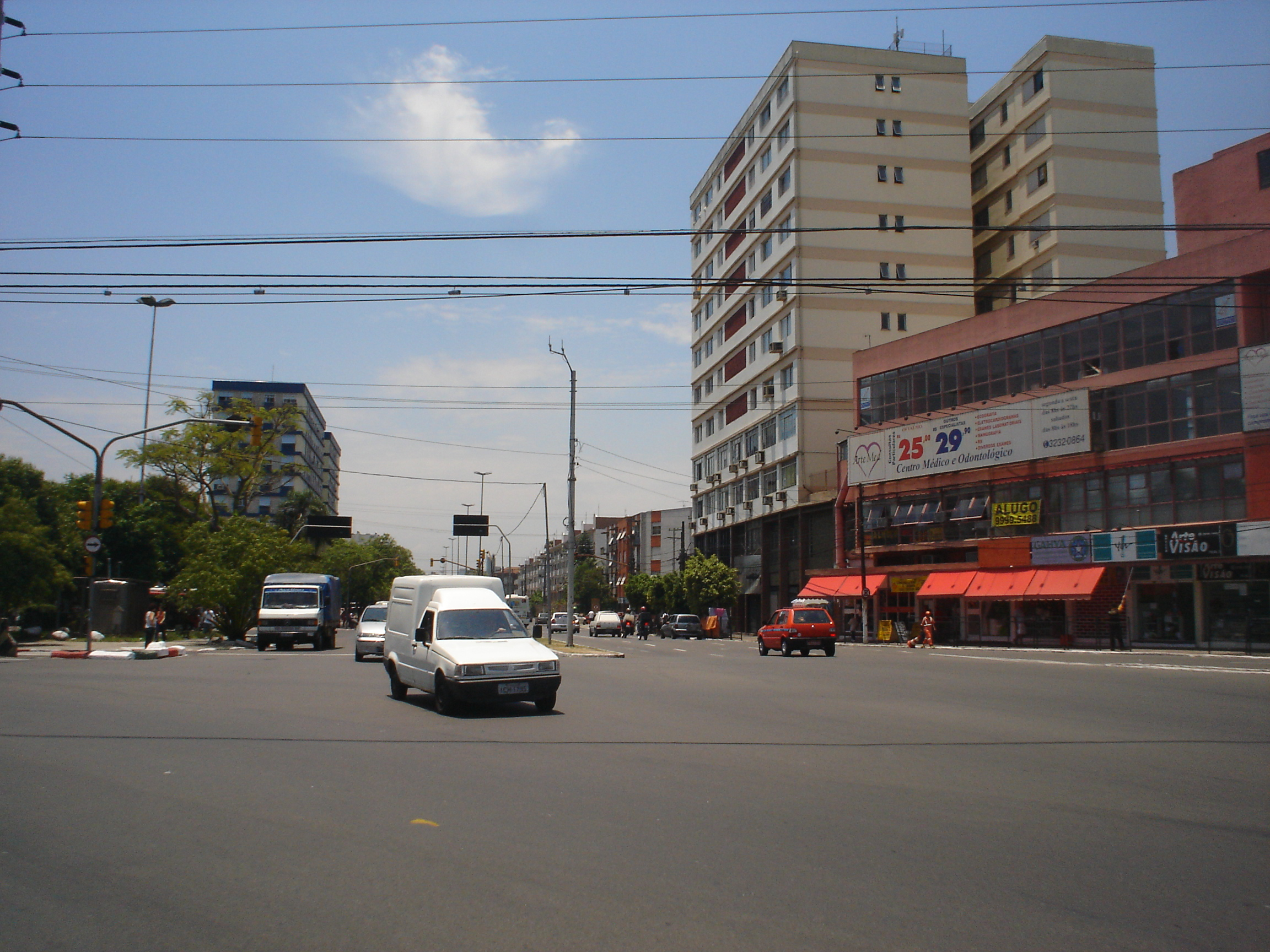
- Princesa Isabel Avenue.

- Location in Brazil
- Country: Brazil
- State: Rio Grande do Sul
- City: Porto Alegre

Azenha (literally Watermill in Portuguese) is a neighbourhood (bairro) in the city of Porto Alegre, the state capital of Rio Grande do Sul, in Brazil.
