= Higienópolis, Rio Grande do Sul =

Neighbourhood in Porto Alegre, Brazil

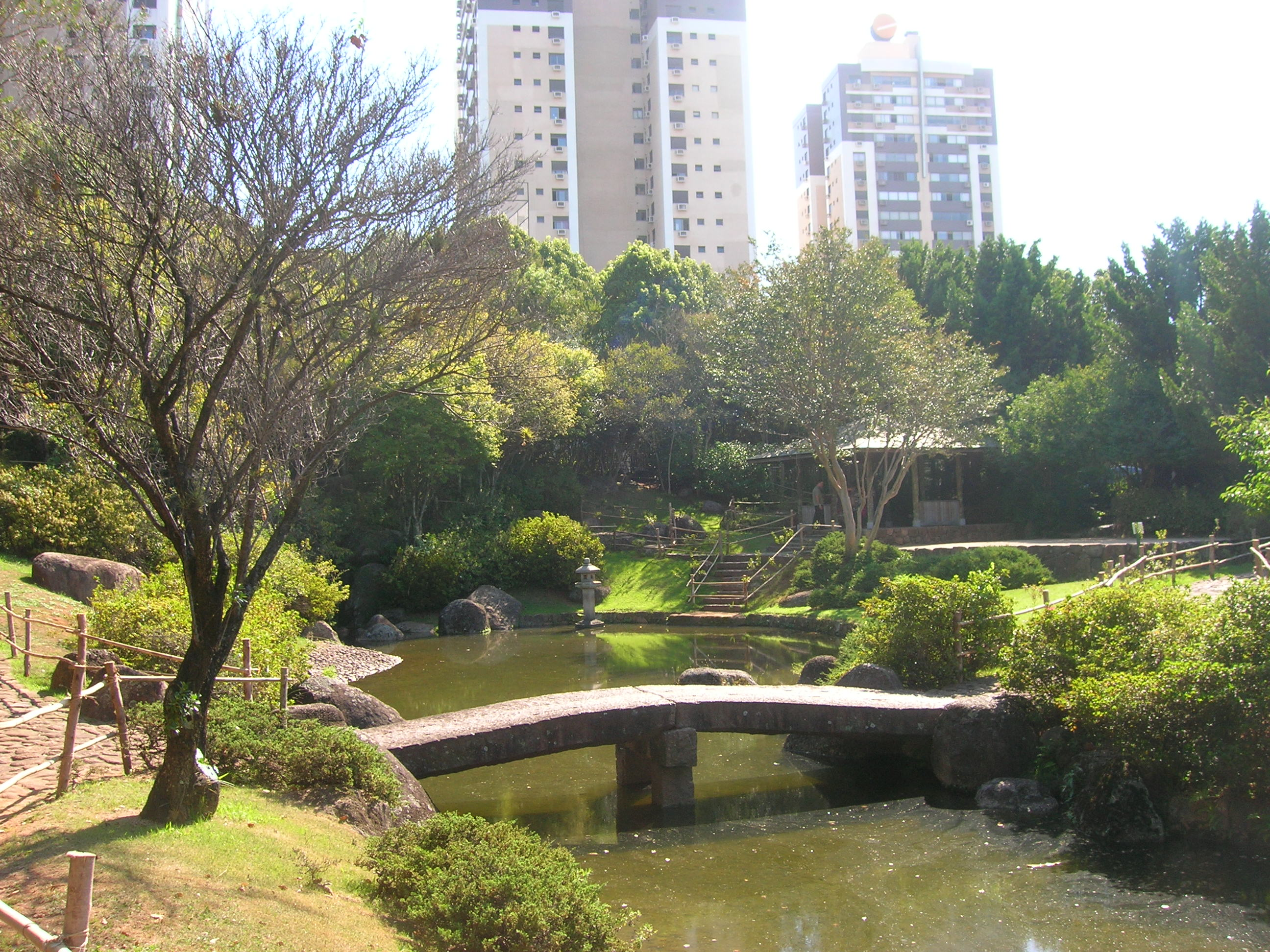
Shiga Square, open to the public since 1983.

Higienópolis (from the Greek Hygieia + Polis) is a neighborhood in the city of Porto Alegre, the state capital of Rio Grande do Sul in Brazil.
