= Jardim Botânico, Rio Grande do Sul =

Neighborhood in Porto Alegre, Brazil

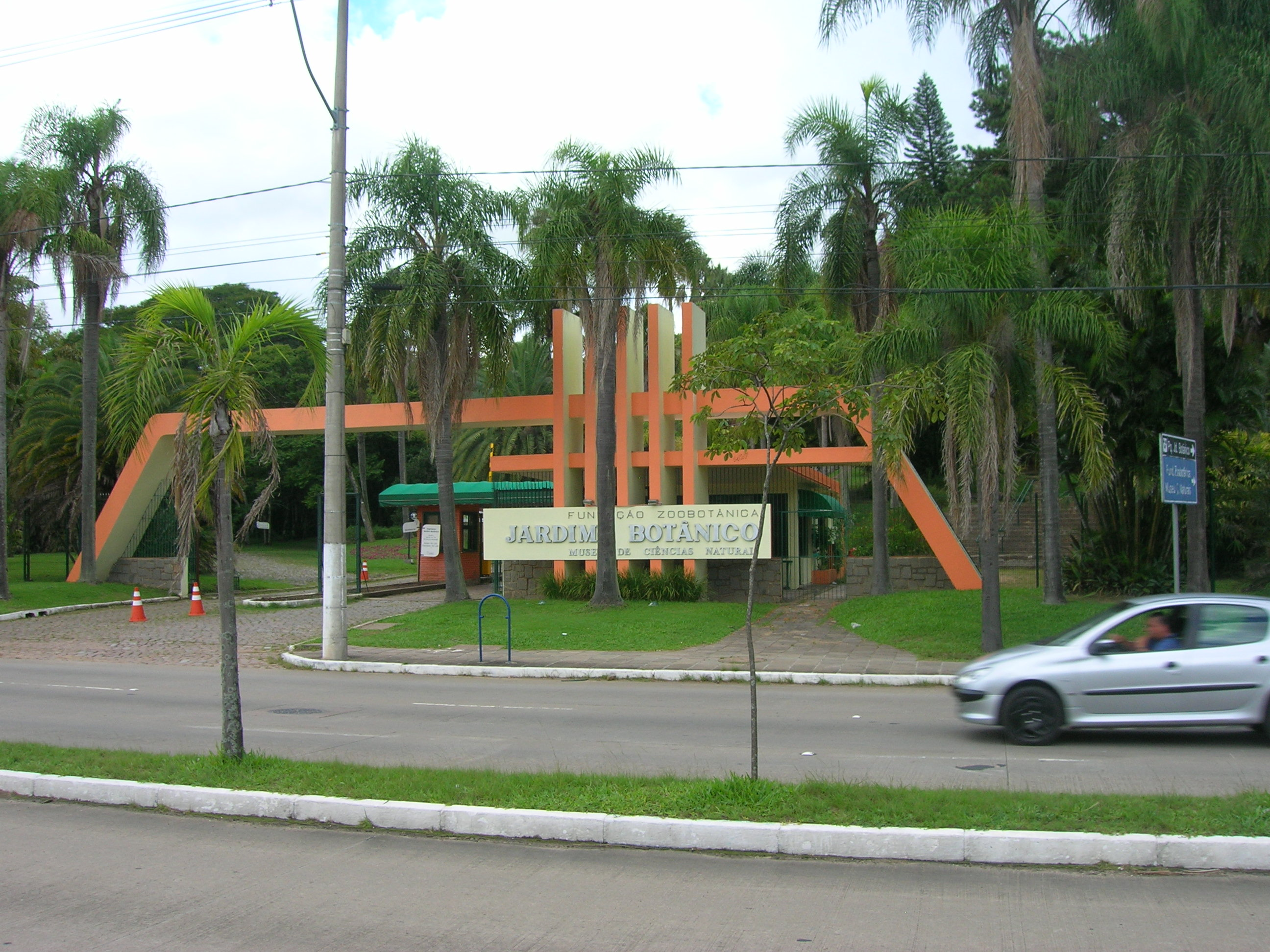
The botanical garden entry.

Jardim Botânico is a neighbourhood (bairro) in the city of Porto Alegre, the state capital of Rio Grande do Sul, Brazil. It was created by Law 2022 from December 7, 1959.

The neighbourhood developed around its main attraction, the Porto Alegre Botanical Garden, after which it was named. Other places include the School of Physical Education of the Federal University of Rio Grande do Sul, the São Lucas Hospital (linked to the Pontifical Catholic University of Rio Grande do Sul), and Bourbon Ipiranga shopping mall.
