= Menino Deus =

Neighborhood in porto alegre

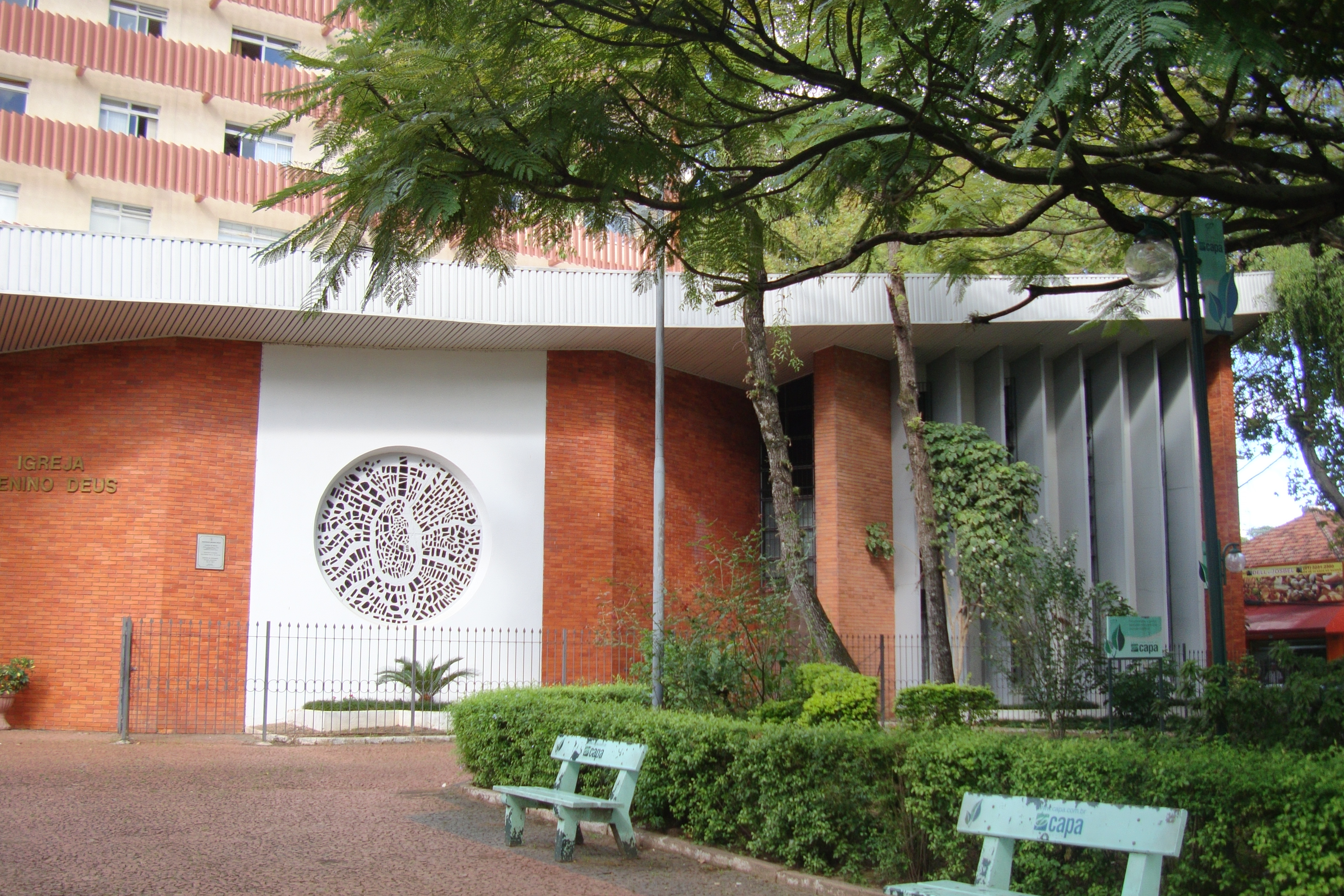
The Menino Deus Church.

Menino Deus (meaning Divine Infant in English) is a neighborhood of the city of Porto Alegre, the state capital of Rio Grande do Sul in Brazil.

The neighborhood was created by Law 2022 of December 7, 1959.

== Demographics ==
- Population: 29,577 2000''
- Area: 215 hectares
- Density: 138 hab/ha/km²
- Number of housing units 11,495

== Famous people ==
- Caio Fernando Abreu, writer.

== See also ==
- Neighborhoods of Porto Alegre
