= Farroupilha, Porto Alegre =

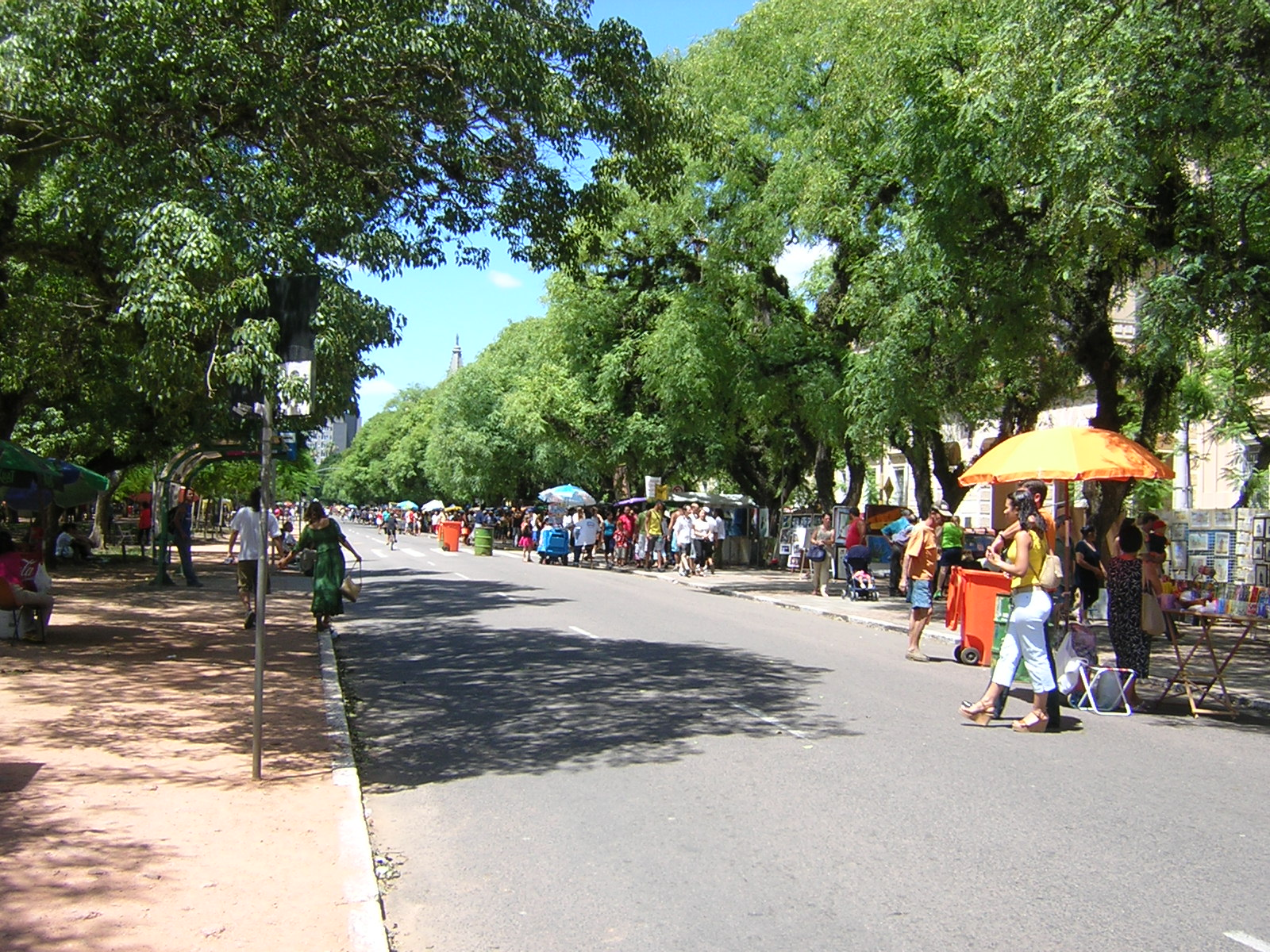
The Brique da Redenção is a traditional fair held every Sunday.

Farroupilha is a neighbourhood (bairro) in the city of Porto Alegre, the state capital of Rio Grande do Sul, in Brazil. It was created by Law 2022 from December 7, 1959.

Farroupilha Park, the most popular in town, is located here, as well as part of the Central Campus of the Federal University of Rio Grande do Sul.
