= Jesuit missions among the Guaraní =

17th to 18th-century Christian missions in central South America

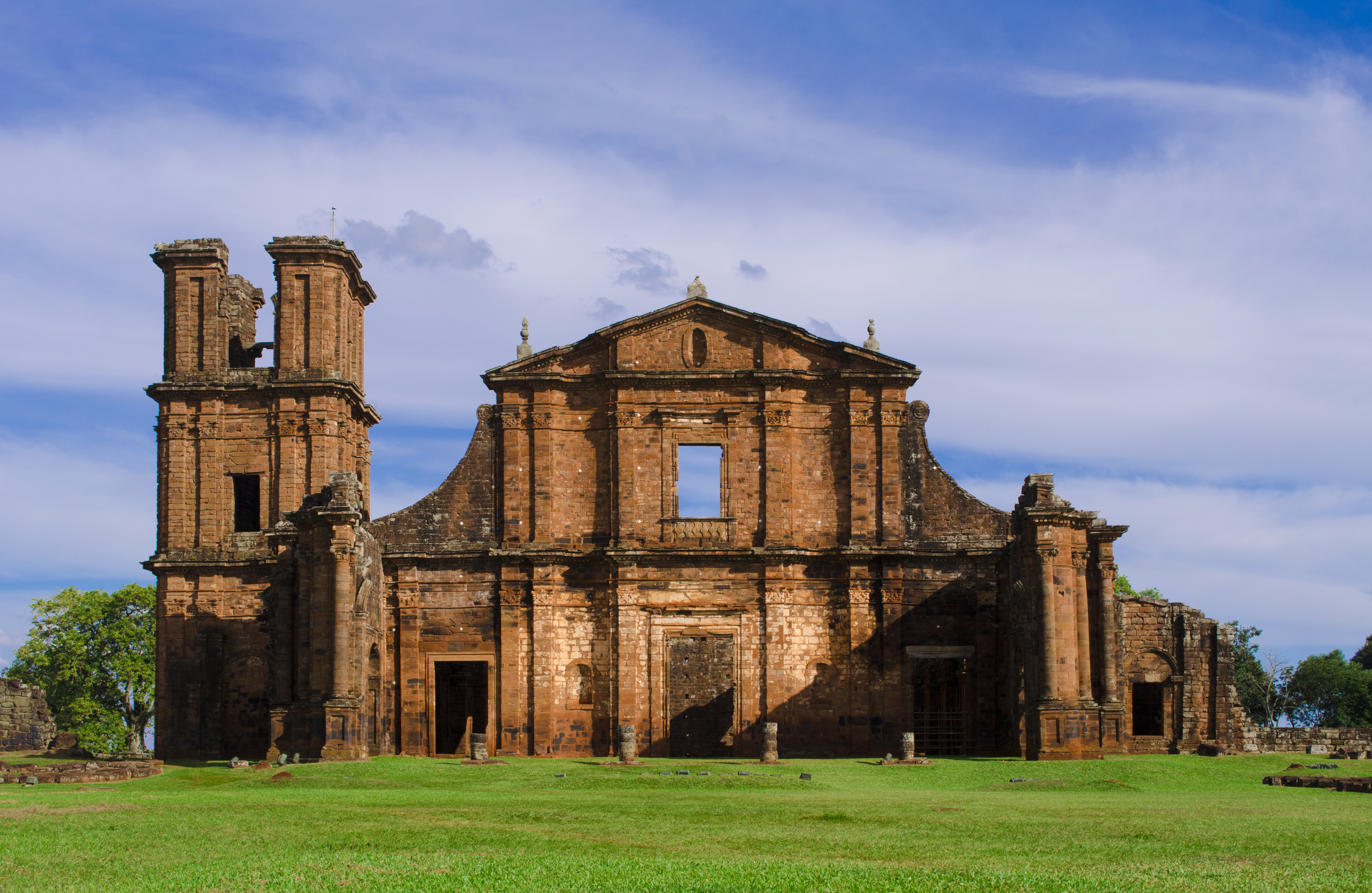
The Spanish Jesuit mission of São Miguel das Missões, Brazil

The Jesuit missions among the Guaraní were a type of settlement for the Guaraní people ("Indians" or "Indios") in an area straddling the borders of present-day Argentina, Brazil and Paraguay, known locally as the triple frontier. The missions were established by the Jesuit Order of the Catholic Church early in the 17th century and ended in the late 18th century after the expulsion of the order from the Americas. The missions have been called an experiment in "socialist theocracy" or a rare example of "benign colonialism". Others have said that "the Jesuits took away the Indians' freedom, forced them to radically change their lifestyle, physically abused them, and subjected them to disease".

In their newly acquired South American dominions, the Spanish and Portuguese Empires adopted a strategy of gathering native populations into communities called "Indian reductions" (Spanish: reducciones de indios, Portuguese: reduções). The objectives of the reductions were to impart Christianity and European culture. Secular as well as religious authorities created "reductions".

The missions among the Guaraní are often called collectively the Río de la Plata missions. The Jesuits attempted to create a "state within a state" in which the native peoples in the reductions, guided by the Jesuits, would remain autonomous and isolated from Spanish colonists and Spanish rule. A major factor attracting the natives to the reductions was the protection they afforded from enslavement and the forced labour of encomiendas.

Under the leadership of both the Jesuits and native caciques, the reductions achieved a high degree of autonomy within the colonial empires. With the use of native labour, the reductions became economically successful. When the incursions of Brazilian Bandeirante slave-traders threatened the existence of the reductions, Indian militias were set up and armed (in defiance of existing royal orders against transfer of firearms to the Indians), which fought effectively against the Portuguese colonists. As a result of the suppression of the Society of Jesus in several European countries, including Spain in 1767, the Jesuits were expelled from the Guaraní missions, and the Americas more generally, by order of the Spanish king Charles III. So ended the era of the Paraguayan reductions. The reasons for the expulsion related more to politics in Europe than to the activities of the Jesuit missions themselves.

The Jesuit Río de la Plata reductions reached a maximum population of 141,182 in 1732 in 30 missions in Brazil, Paraguay, and Argentina. The reductions of the Jesuit Missions of Chiquitos, in eastern Bolivia, reached a maximum population of 25,000 in 1766. Jesuit reductions in the Llanos de Moxos, also in Bolivia, reached a population of about 30,000 in 1720. In Chiquitos, the first reduction was founded in 1691 and in the Llanos de Moxos in 1682.

== History ==
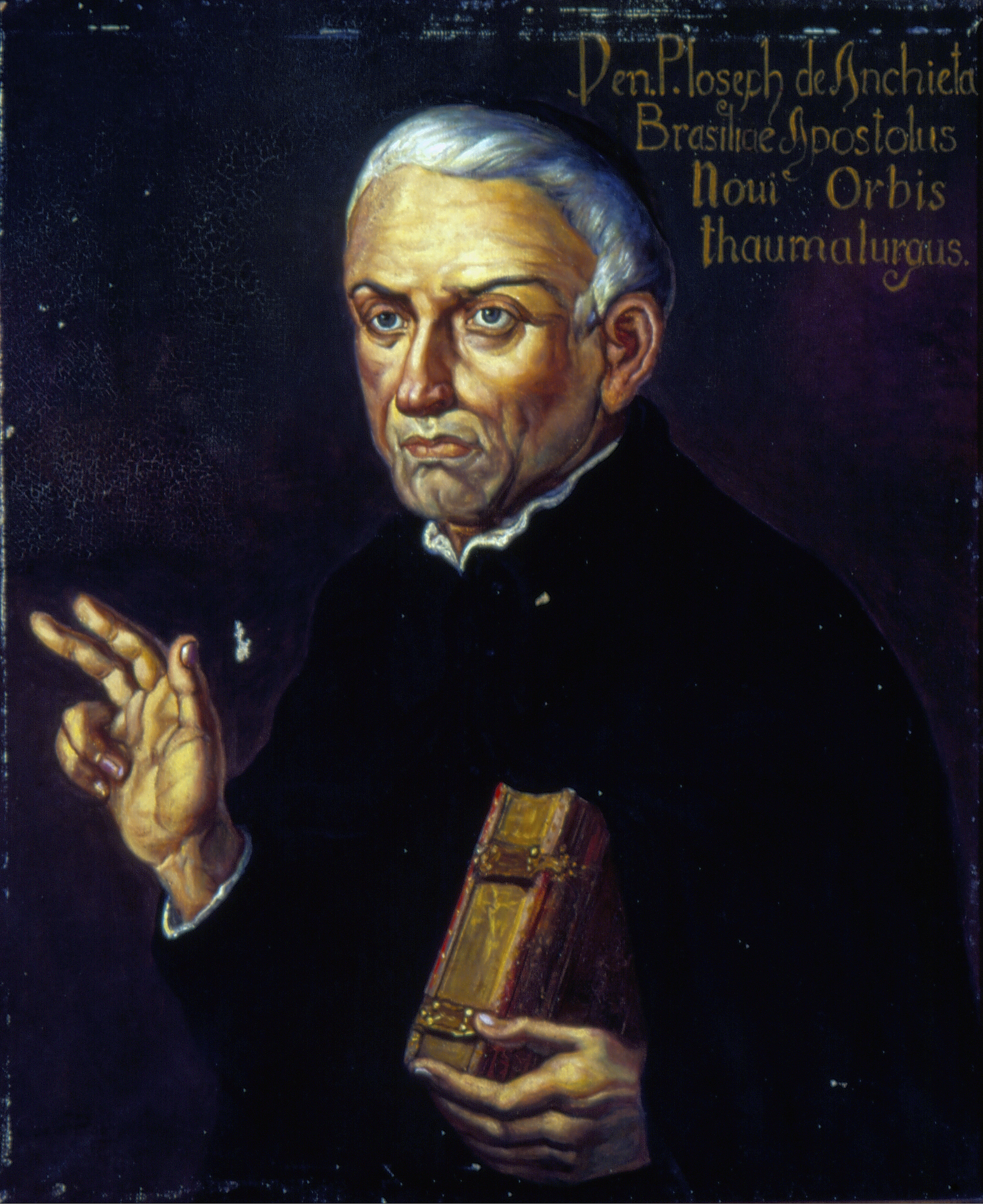
The Spanish missionary Joseph of Anchieta was, together with Manuel da Nóbrega, the first Jesuit that Ignacio de Loyola sent to the Americas

In the 16th century, priests of different religious orders set out to evangelize the Americas, bringing Christianity to indigenous communities. The colonial governments and missionaries agreed on the strategy of gathering the often nomadic indigenous populations in larger communities called reductions in order to more effectively govern, tax, and evangelize them. Reductions generally were also construed as an instrument to make the Indians adopt European lifestyles and values. In Mexico the policy was called congregación, and also took the form of the hospitals of Vasco de Quiroga and the Franciscan Missions of California. In Portuguese Brazil reductions were known as aldeias. Legally, under colonial rule, Indians were classified as minors, in effect children, to be protected and guided to salvation (conversion to Christianity) by European missionaries.

The Jesuits, formally founded only in 1540, were relatively late arrivals in the New World, from about 1570, especially compared to the Dominicans and Franciscans, and therefore had to look to the frontiers of colonization for mission areas. The Jesuit reductions originated in the early seventeenth century when Bishop Lizarraga asked for missionaries for Paraguay. In 1609, acting under instructions from Phillip III, the Spanish governor of Asunción made a deal with the Jesuit Provincial of Paraguay. The Jesuits agreed to set up hamlets at strategic points along the Paraná river, that were populated with Indians and maintained a separation from Spanish towns. The Jesuits were to "enjoy a tax holiday for ten years" which extended longer. This mission strategy continued for 150 years until the Jesuits were expelled in 1767. Fundamentally the purpose, as far as the government was concerned, was to safeguard the frontier with the reductions where Indians were introduced to European culture.

The reductions were considered by some philosophers as idyllic communities of noble savages, and were praised as such by Montesquieu in his L'Esprit des Lois (1748), and even by Rousseau, no friend of the Catholic Church. Their story has continued to be the subject of romanticizing, as in the film The Mission (1986), whose story relates to the events of the 1750s on a miniature scale. The Jesuit reductions have been lavishly praised as a "socialist utopia" and a "Christian communistic republic" as well as criticized for their "rigid, severe and meticulous regimentation" of the lives of the indigenous peoples they ruled with a firm hand through Guaraní intermediaries.

=== Failure and flight ===
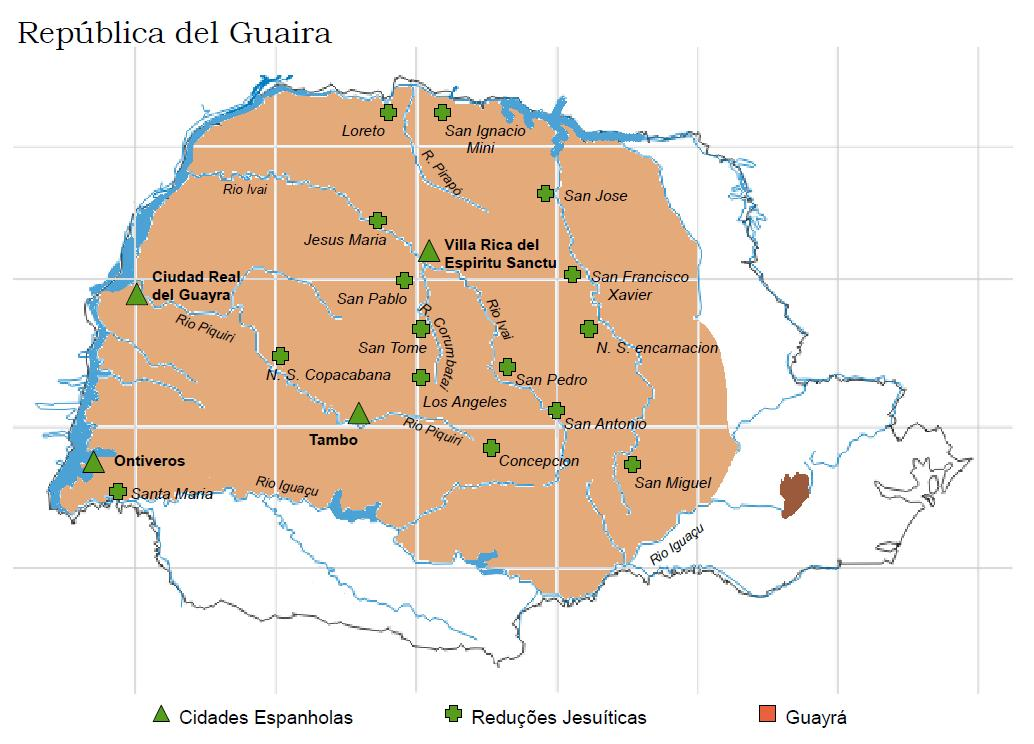
Map of the modern state of Paraná, Brazil, showing the Spanish Guayrá in brown. Jesuit missions are marked with crosses. All the missions were abandoned by 1638 and their inhabitants moved southwestward after the raids

In 1609 three Jesuits began the first reduction in San Ignacio Guazú in present-day Paraguay. For the next 22 years the Jesuits focused on founding 15 missions in the province of Guayrá, corresponding to the western two-thirds of present-day Paraná state of Brazil, spread over an area of more than 100,000 square kilometres (39,000 sq mi). The total Native population of this area was probably about 100,000.

The establishment of these missions was not without difficulty and danger. The Guaraní shamans resisted the imposition of a new religion and up to 7 Jesuits were killed by Indians during the first few years after the missions were established. In 1618 the first of a series of epidemics spread among the missions and killed thousands of the Guaraní. The congregation of the Guaraní into large settlements at the missions facilitated the spread of diseases. Nevertheless, the missions soon had 40,000 Guaraní in residence. Tens of thousands of Guaraní living in the same region remained outside the missions, living in their traditional manner and practicing their traditional religion.

The reductions were within Portuguese-claimed territory and large-scale raids by the Bandeirante slavers of São Paulo on the missions and non-mission Guaraní began in 1628. The Bandeirantes destroyed many missions and decimated and scattered the mission population. They looked upon the reductions with their concentration of Guaraní as an opportunity to capture slaves more easily than usual. Beginning in 1631 and concluding in 1638 the Jesuits moved the mission survivors still in residence, approximately 12,000 people, southwestward about 500 kilometres (310 mi) to an area under Spanish control that in the 21st century is divided among Paraguay, Argentina, and Brazil. There were already Jesuit missions in the area and the refugees from Guayrá were also joined by Guaraní refugees from Uruguay and Tapé (in present-day Rio Grande do Sul, Brazil) who had suffered similar experiences.

In the 1630s, the Jesuits also established short-lived missions in the Itatín region of present-day Mato Grosso do Sul, Brazil. They were destroyed by Bandeirantes and revolts by the local indigenous people.

=== Reestablishment and success ===
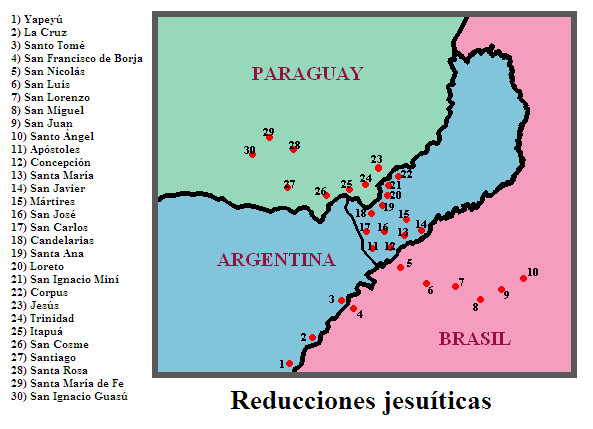
Location of the most important Spanish Jesuit reductions (1631-1767) in Argentina, Brazil and Paraguay with present-day borders

At the new locations, the Jesuits established 30 reductions, collectively often called the Rio de la Plata missions. By 1641, despite slavers and epidemics, the Guaraní population of the Rio de la Plata missions was 36,190. For nearly a century thereafter, the mission population increased to a maximum of 141,242 in 1732. Populations of individual reductions varied from 2,000 to 7,000.

The immediate need of the Guaraní in the 1640s was to protect themselves from slavers. The Jesuits began to arm them, producing guns and gunpowder in the missions. They also secured the Spanish Crown's permission, and some arms, to raise militias of Indians to defend the reductions against raids. The Bandeirantes followed the reductions into Spanish territory, but in 1641 the Guaraní militia defeated an army of 1,500 or more Bandeirante slavers and Tupi auxiliaries at the battle of Mbororé. The militias would eventually number as many as 4,000 troops and their cavalry was especially effective, wearing European-style uniforms and carrying bows and arrows as well as muskets.

Over a century passed until, in the 1750 Treaty of Madrid, the Spanish ceded to the Portuguese territories including the Misiones Orientales, reductions now in Brazil, threatening to expose the Indians again to the more oppressive Portuguese system. The Jesuits complied, trying to relocate the population across the Uruguay river as the treaty allowed, but the Guaraní militia under the mission-born Sepé Tiaraju resisted. What came to be known as the War of the Reductions, or the Guaraní War, ended when a larger combined force of 3,000 Spanish and Portuguese troops crushed the revolt in 1756, with Guaraní losses, both in the battle and subsequent massacres, of over 1,500.

The reductions came to be considered a threat by the secular authorities and were caught up in the growing attack on the Jesuits in Europe for unrelated reasons. The economic success of the reductions, which was considerable, although not as great as often described, combined with the Jesuits' independence, became a cause of concern.

=== Expulsion ===
In 1767, king Charles III of Spain (1759–88) expelled the Jesuits from the Spanish dominions in the Americas. The expulsion was part of an effort in the Bourbon Reforms to assert more control over the American colonies. In total, 78 Jesuits departed from the missions leaving behind 89,000 Guaraní in 30 missions.

According to historian Sarreal, most Guaraní initially welcomed the expulsion of the Jesuits. Spanish authorities made promises to Guaraní leaders and gained their support. The Guaraní leaders of one mission thanked the authorities who "liberated us from the bondage that we lived in as slaves". Within two years, however, the financial situation of the missions was deteriorating and the Guaraní began leaving the missions seeking both freedom and higher wages. A decree in 1800 freed the Guaraní still in the missions from their communal obligation to labor. By 1840, after Spain's loss of the territories, the former missions were in ruins. While some Guaraní were employed outside the missions, many families were impoverished. A growing number of mestizos occupied what had formerly been mission lands. in 1848, Paraguayan president Carlos Antonio López declared that all Indians were citizens of Paraguay and distributed the last of the missions' communal lands.

Some of the reductions have continued to be inhabited as towns. Córdoba, Argentina, the largest city associated with the reductions, was atypical as a Spanish settlement that predated the Jesuits and functioned as a centre for the Jesuit presence, with a novitiate centre and a college that is now the local university. The Córdoba mission was taken over by the Franciscans in 1767. Many of the missions in ruins have been declared UNESCO World Heritage Sites, including six of the Jesuit Missions of Chiquitos in Bolivia, and the ruins of Jesuit Missions of La Santísima Trinidad de Paraná and Jesús de Tavarangue in Paraguay. Two creole languages, Língua Geral and Nheengatu, based on Guaraní, Tupi, and Portuguese, originated in the reductions.

== Other reductions ==
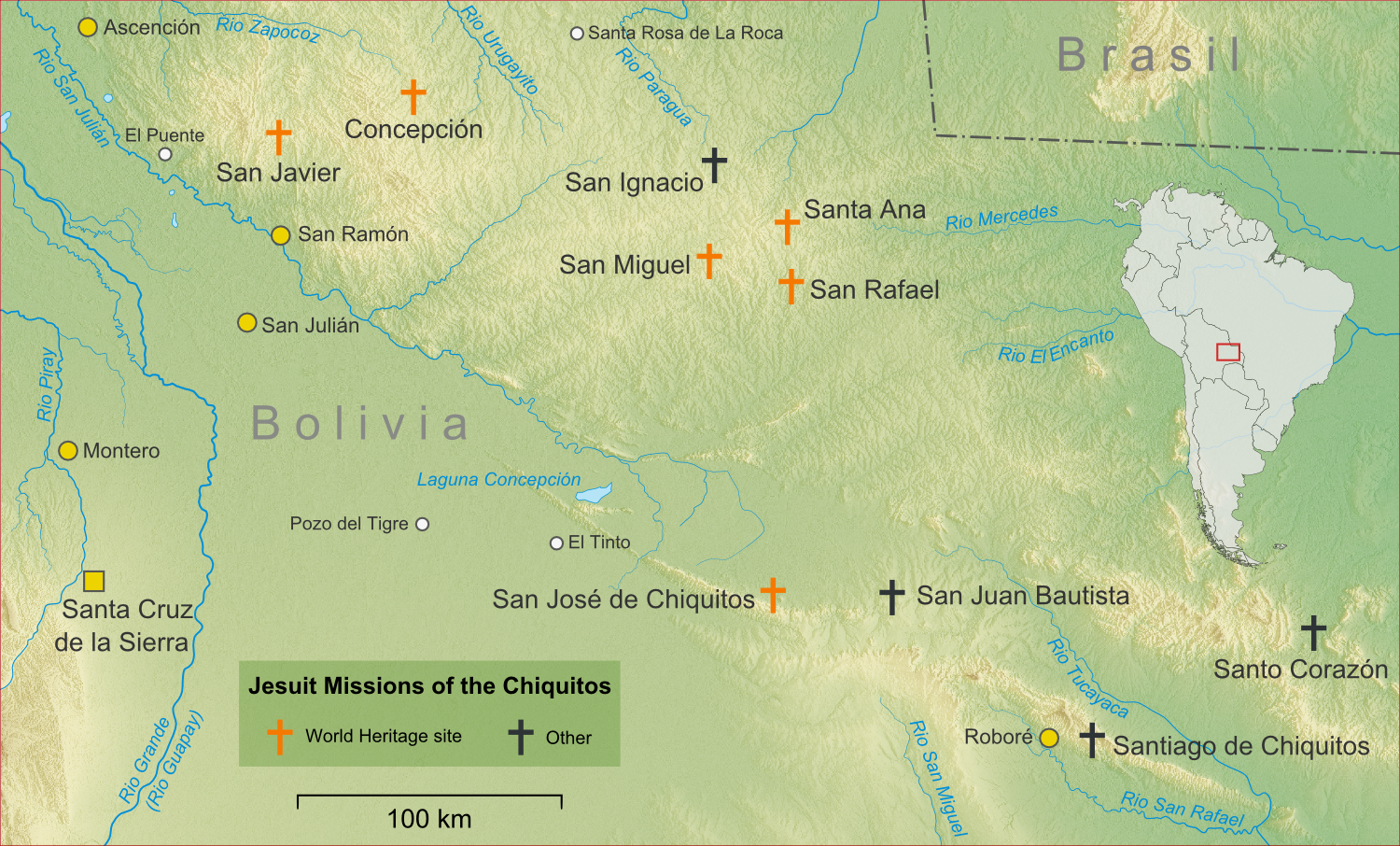
Location of the Chiquitos missions in Bolivia

The Jesuit success in the Rio de la Plata, Chiquitos, and Llanos de Moxos missions was not duplicated by missions among the populous and warlike Eastern Bolivian Guaraní (Chiriguanos) of the Andes foothills. A Jesuit mission amongst the Chiriguanos in 1767 had only 268 converts. Likewise, the Jesuits had little success among the Guaycuru peoples, several nomadic tribes who dominated the Gran Chaco.

== Mission life ==
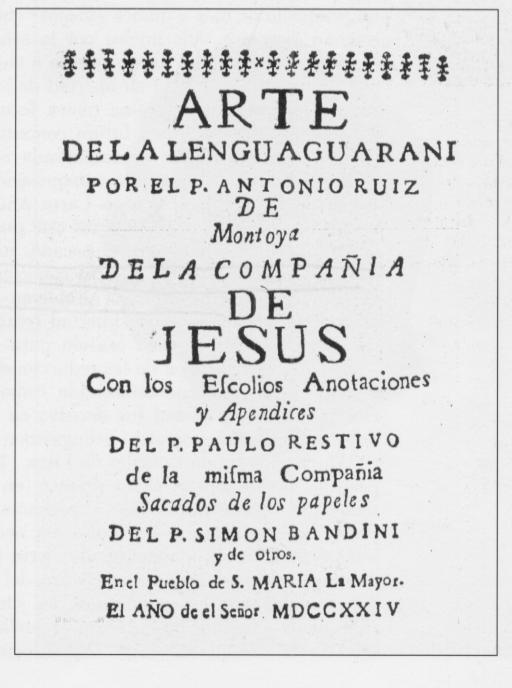
Title page of a book on the Guaraní language by two Jesuits, printed at a reduction in 1724

At the height of the reductions, in 1740, about 30 different communities were home to more than 140,000 Guaraní. Another 50,000 more Tupi, Chiquitos, and members of diverse ethnic groups in the Llanos de Moxos were in Jesuit reductions in Bolivia.

The reductions were ruled by indigenous chiefs who served as the reductions' governors, but were controlled by the Jesuits. There was a minimum of two Jesuits in a reduction, with more for larger ones. The social organization of the reductions has often been described as extremely efficient; most were self-supporting and even produced surpluses of goods, which they traded to outside communities, which laid the foundation of the belief that Jesuits were guarding immense riches acquired through Indian labour. The main traded products were cowhides and yerba mate (a herbal tea). Initially these were gathered from the wild, but later cultivated. A number of trades and skills were taught to some Indians, including even printing to produce mostly religious texts in indigenous languages, some illustrated by engravings by indigenous artists. In reality the communities were economically successful, but hardly constituted any important source of income for the Jesuit order. The degree to which the Jesuits controlled the indigenous population for which they had responsibility and the degree to which they allowed indigenous culture to function is a matter of debate.

The main buildings, especially the churches, were often substantial Baroque constructions made by trained indigenous craftsmen and often remain impressive after over two centuries of abandonment, though the elaborate carved wood interiors have vanished in these cases. The first buildings were usually made in wood, which was sometimes covered with stucco decoration imitating stone Baroque architecture. Later, if resources allowed, actual stone buildings would follow, sometimes very large. The Bolivian missions have the best surviving wood and adobe churches. Father Martin Schmid (1694–1772), a Swiss Jesuit who was a leading figure in the reductions, was both an architect and a composer, and is usually given much of the credit for both the later architecture and the remarkable musical life of the reductions.

=== Mission layout ===
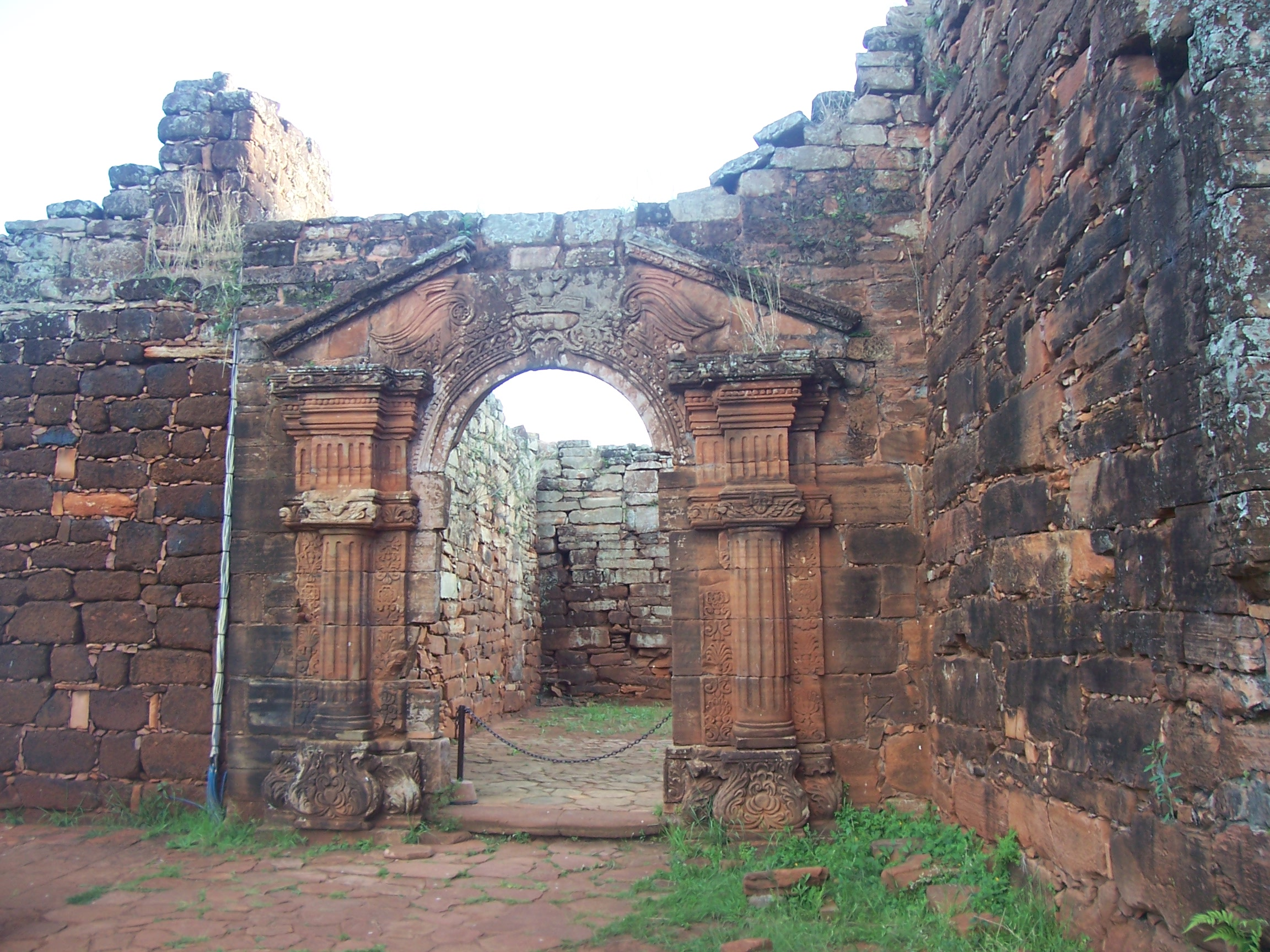
Church from the reduction of San Ignacio Mini in Argentina

The ruins of several of the missions still remain. They were laid out in a uniform plan. The buildings were grouped about a central square, the church and store-houses at one end, and the dwellings of the natives, in long barracks, forming the other three sides. Each family had its own separate apartment, but one veranda and one roof served for perhaps a hundred families. The churches were of stone or fine wood, with lofty towers, elaborate sculptures and richly adorned altars, with statuary imported from Italy and Spain. The priests' quarters, the commissary, the stables, the armory, the workshop, and the hospital, also usually of stone, formed an inner square adjoining the church. The plaza itself was a level grass plot kept cropped by sheep. The native houses were sometimes of stone but more often of adobe or cane, with home-made furniture and religious pictures often made by the natives themselves.

=== Life at the missions ===
In the morning, children's hymns were followed by Mass and breakfast, after which the workers went to their tasks.

The Jesuits marshaled their neophytes to the sound of music, and in procession to the fields, with a saint borne high aloft, the community each day at sunrise took its way. Along the way at stated intervals were shrines of saints where they prayed, and sang hymns between shrines. As the procession advanced it became gradually smaller as groups of Indians dropped off to work the various fields and finally the priest and acolyte with the musicians returned alone.

At noon each group assembled for the Angelus, after which came dinner and a siesta; work was then resumed until evening. After supper came the rosary and sleep. On rainy days they worked indoors. Frequent festivals with sham battles, fireworks, concerts, and dances enlivened the community.

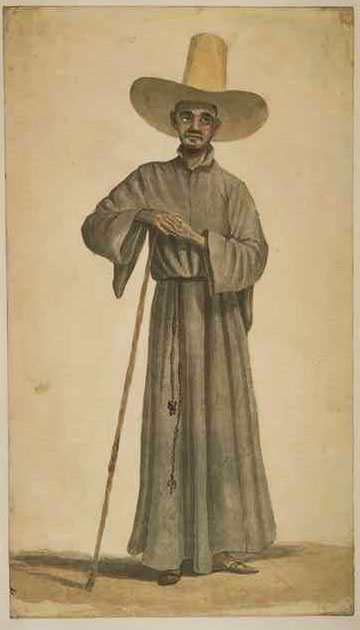
A Jesuit in 18th-century Brazil

Aside from the main farm, each man typically had his own garden, pursuing agriculture, stock raising, and the cultivation of yerba mate. Jesuits introduced many European trades and arts to their communities. Cotton weavers, tanners, carpenters, tailors, hat makers, coopers, boat builders, silversmiths, musicians and makers of musical instruments, painters, and turners could sometimes be found. They also had printers, and manuscripts were also produced by hand copying.

The goods that were produced at the missions, including cattle, were sold in Buenos Aires and other markets under the supervision of the priests. The proceeds earned were divided among a common fund, the workers, and dependents.

Much emphasis was placed on education, as early training was regarded as the key to future success. Much of the instruction was conducted in Guaraní, which was still the prevailing language of the region, but Spanish was also taught.

Total Population of Guaraní reductions
Year	Population	Comments
1641	36,190	
1700	86,173	Steady growth since 1647
1732	141,242	Largest population of reductions
1740	73,910	Reduced population due to epidemics
1768	88,864	Jesuits expelled
1801	45,637	Reductions in decline

== Jesuit missions by country ==
=== Argentina ===
- San Ignacio Mini in Misiones Province
- Nuestra Señora de Santa Ana in Misiones Province
- Nuestra Señora de Loreto in Misiones Province
- Santa María la Mayor in Misiones Province
- Jesuit Block and Estancias of Córdoba in Córdoba

=== Bolivia ===
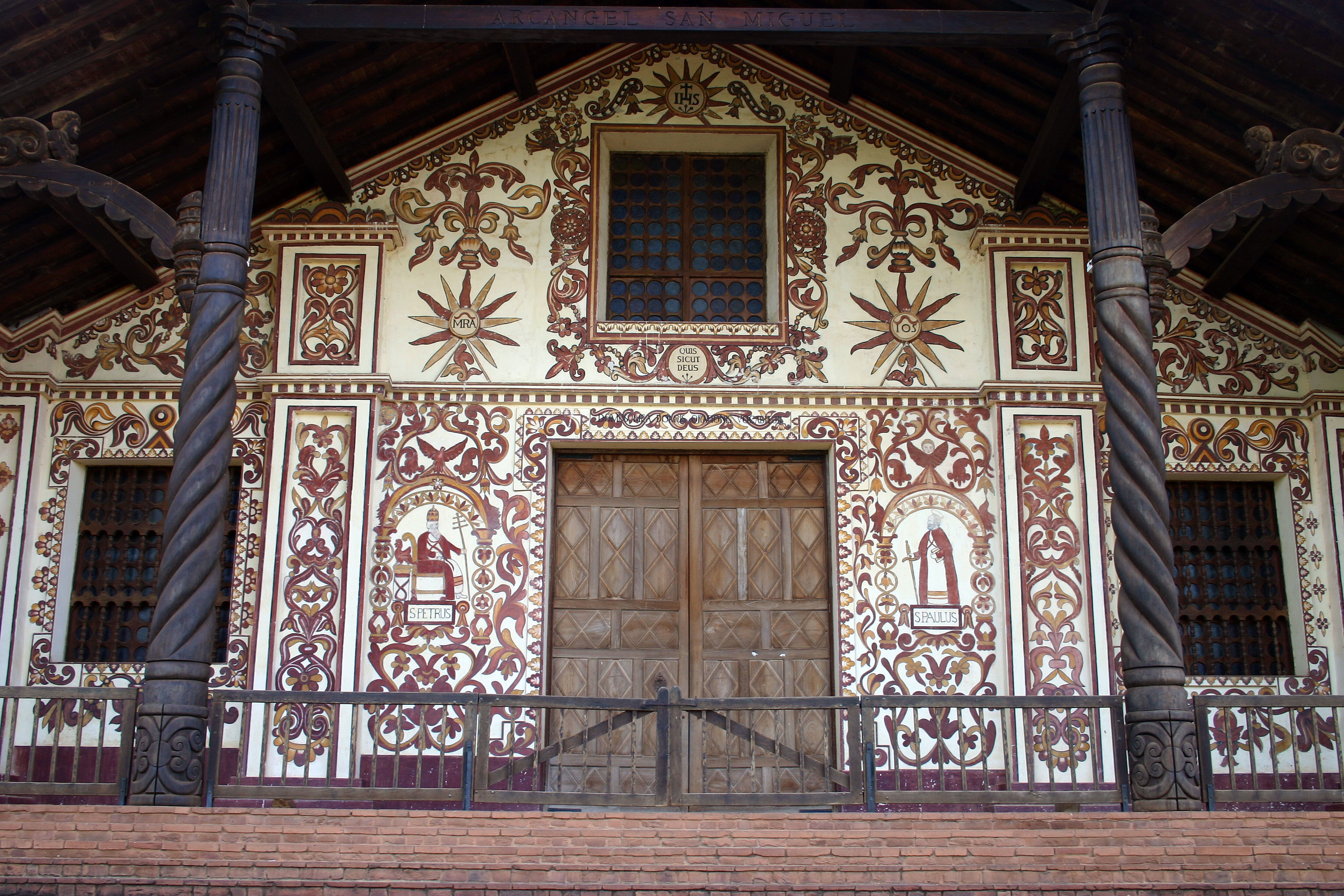
Mission church of San Miguel de Velasco, completed in 1760, Jesuit Missions of Chiquitos, Bolivia

- San Javier
- Concepción
- San Ignacio de Velasco
- Santa Ana de Velasco
- San Miguel de Velasco
- San Rafael de Velasco
- San José de Chiquitos
- Santiago de Chiquitos
- San Juan Bautista
- Santo Corazón
- San Ignacio de Zamucos

=== Brazil ===
- São Miguel das Missões
- São João Batista
- São Lourenço Martir
- São Nicolau
- São Francisco de Borgia
- São Luis Gonzaga
- Santo Ângelo Custódio

=== Paraguay ===
- La Santisima Trinidad de Paraná
- Jesús de Tavarangue
- San Cosme y Damian
- Encarnacion de Itapua
- Santa Maria de Fey
- San Ignacio Guazú
- Santiago Apóstol
- Santa Rosa de Lima

=== Uruguay ===
- Nuestra Señora de los Desamparados, on the coast of Santa Lucia River.
- Estancia del Rio de las Vacas, founded in 1741 and known today as "Calera de las Huérfanas", in Colonia Department near Carmelo

== Gallery ==
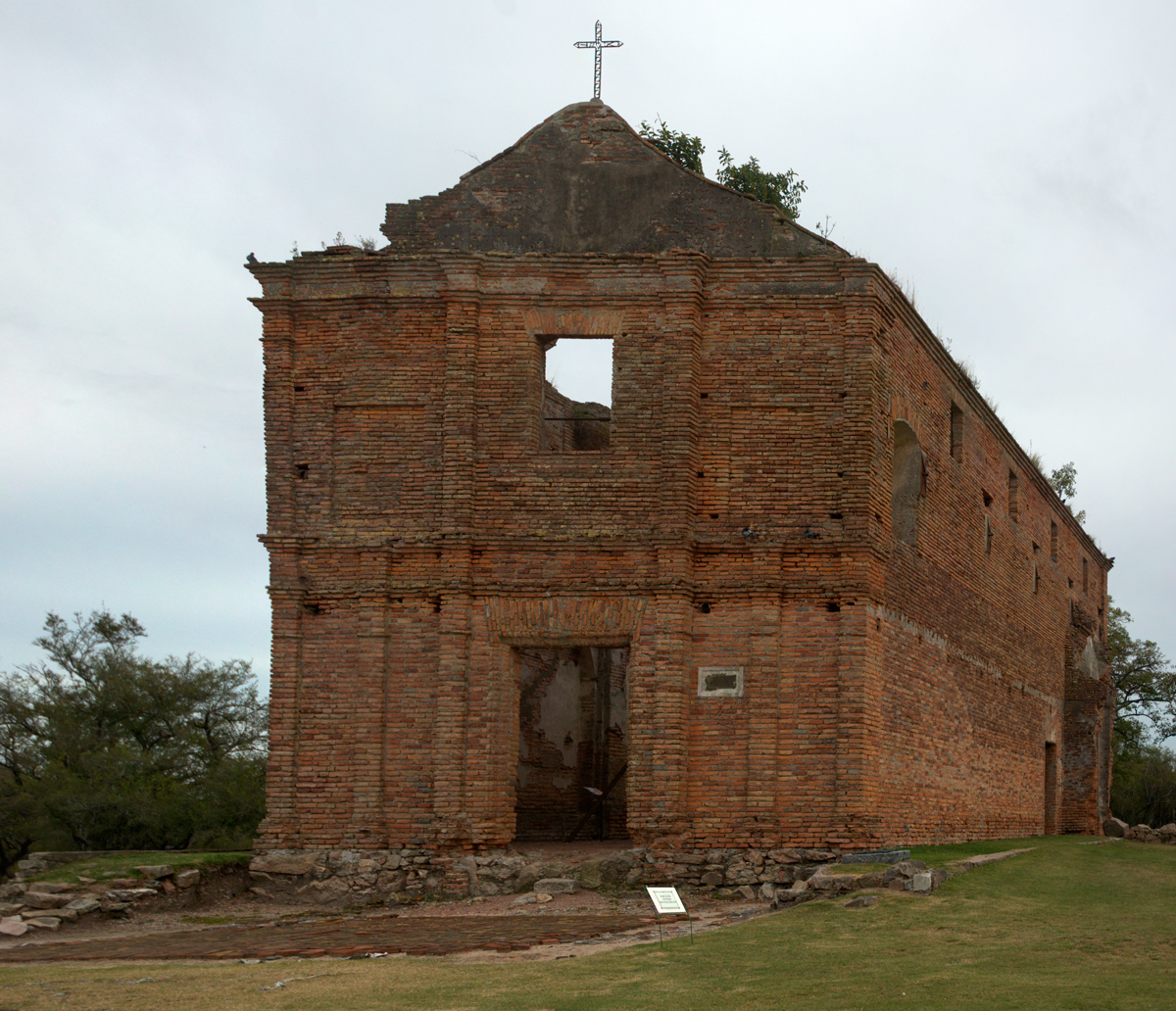
Church built by the Jesuits in the present territory of Uruguay, in the locality called "Calera de las Huérfanas"

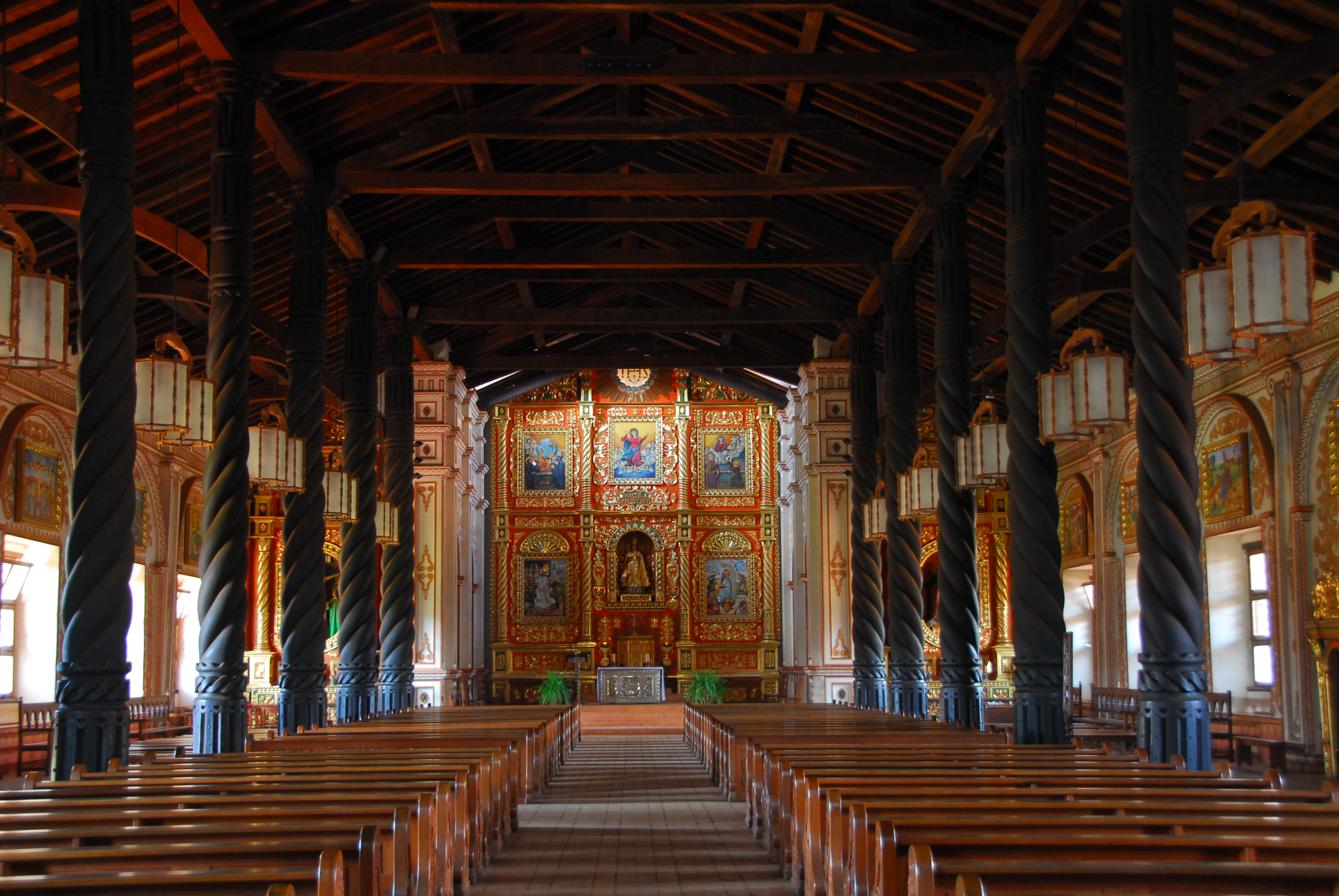
Interior of the wooden church at Concepcion, Santa Cruz, Bolivia

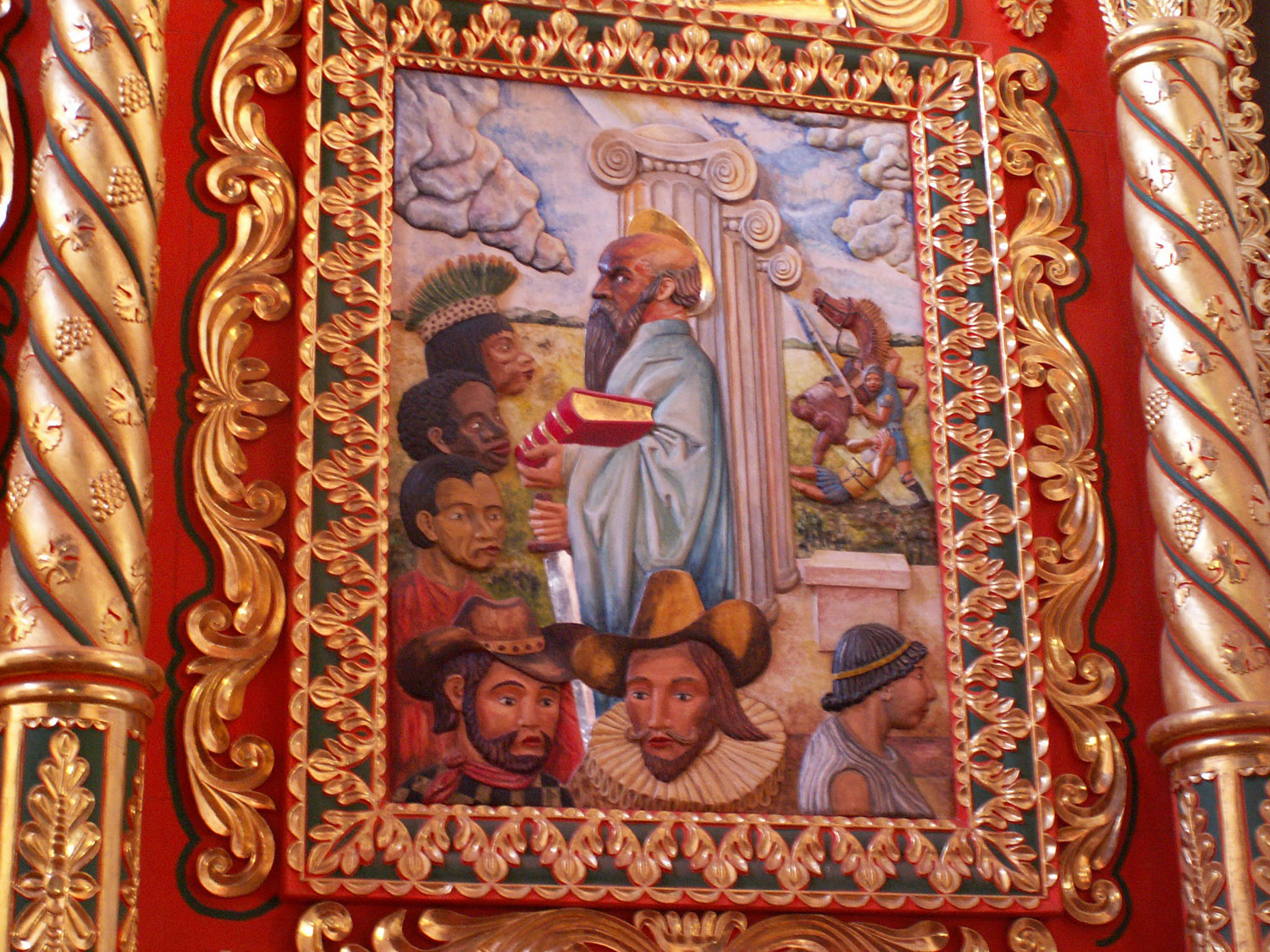
Painted wooden relief in the same church

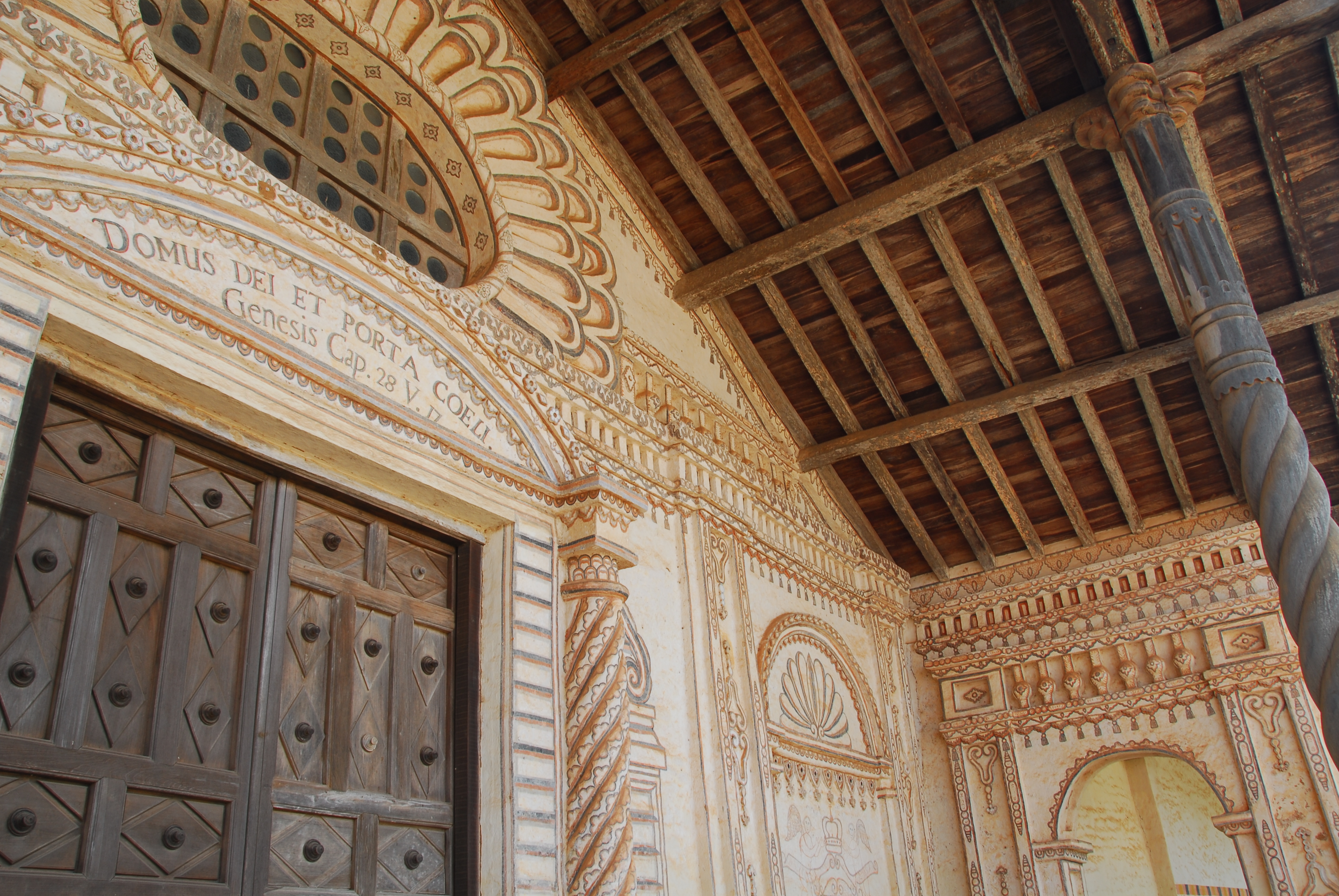
Detail of adobe facade at San Javier, Ñuflo de Chávez, Santa Cruz, Bolivia

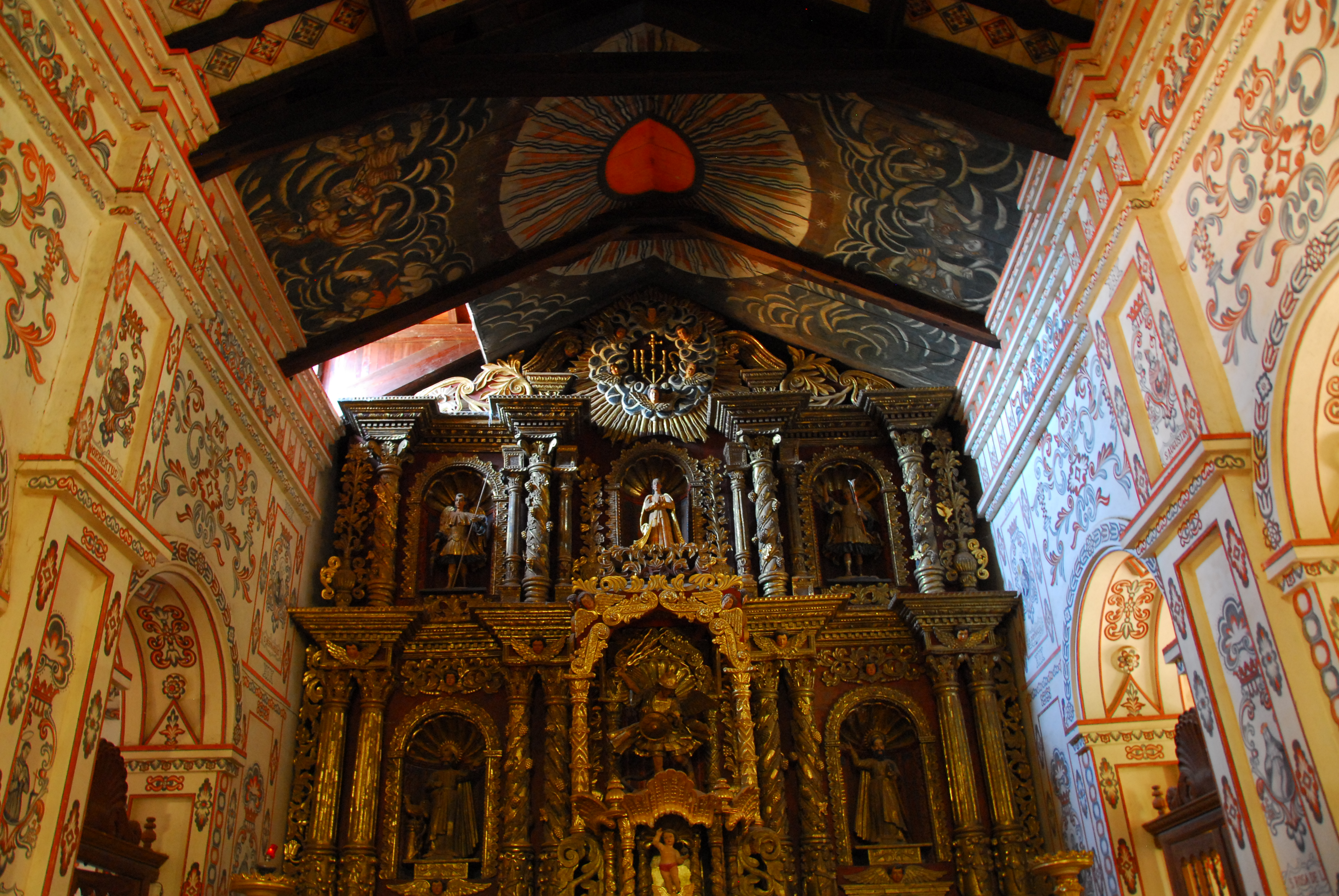
Detail of the altar retable at San Miguel de Velasco, Santa Cruz

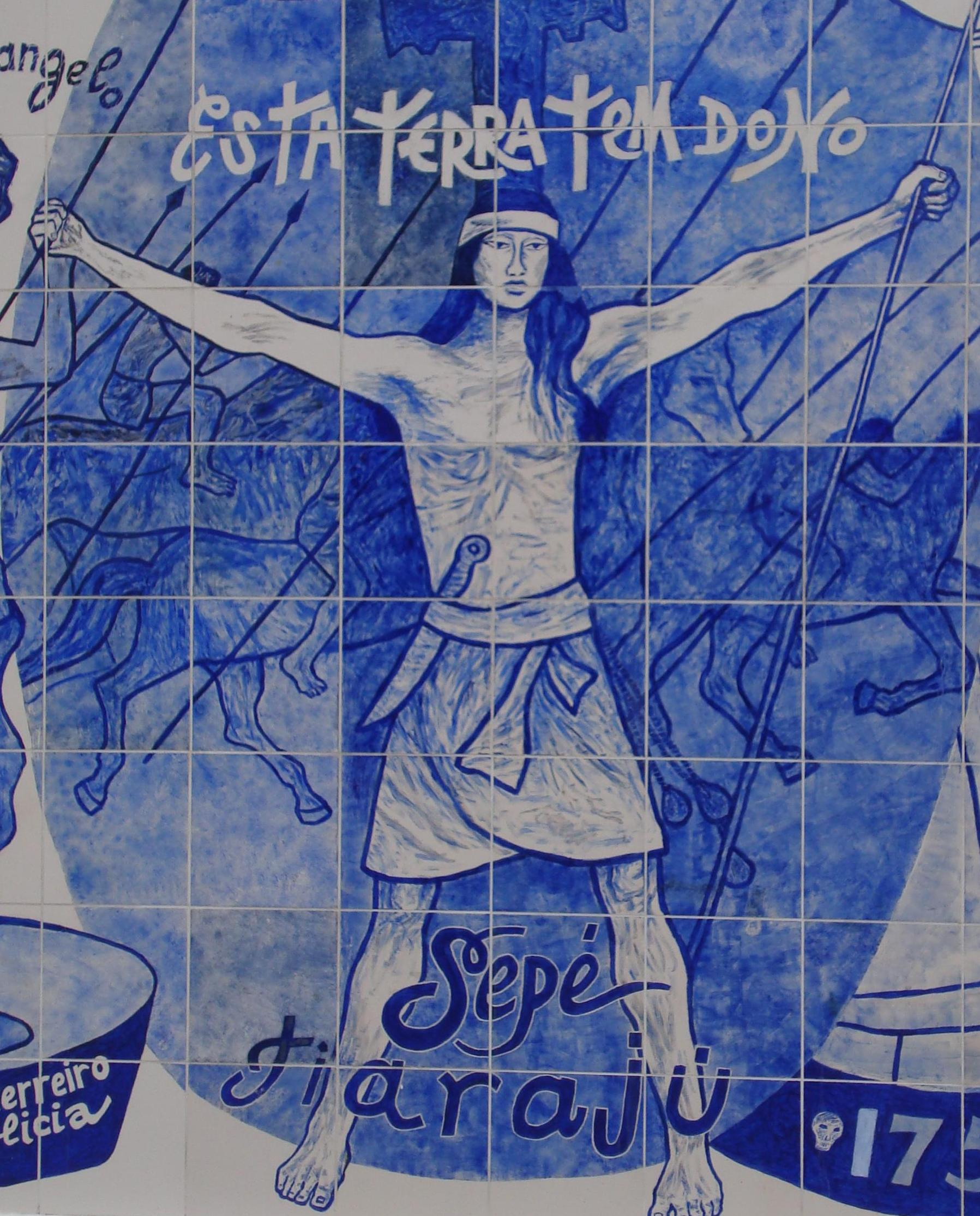
Sepé Tiaraju, the leader of the Guaraní rebels, in the Rio Grande do Sul Epic Memorial, at the entrance of the Mercado Station of the Porto Alegre Metro

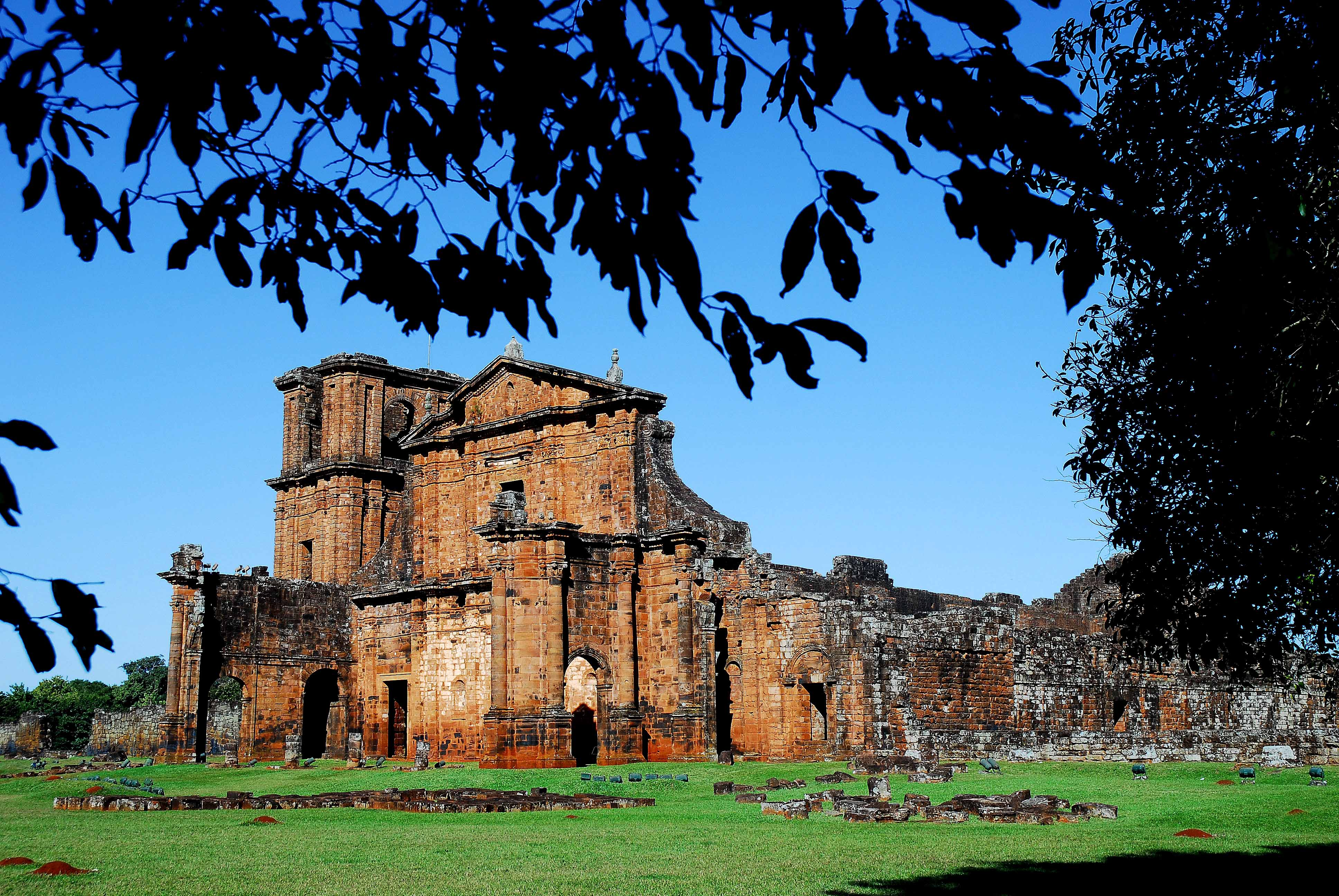
Remanescentes e ruínas da Igreja de São Miguel. (pt)

== See also ==
- Spanish missions in South America
- Jesuit Missions of Chiquitos
- Catholic Church and the Age of Discovery
- Catholic missions
- Indian Reductions
- Mission (station)
- Sculpture of the Misiones Orientales
- History of yerba mate
