= Spanish missions in South America =

The Spanish missions in South America comprise a series of Jesuit Catholic religious outposts established by Spanish Catholics in order to spread the Christian doctrine among the local natives.

== Missions ==
=== Argentina ===
- Mission San Ignacio Miní (1632), in Misiones Province
- Mission Nuestra Señora de Santa Ana (1637), in Misiones Province
- Mission Nuestra Señora de Loreto (1610), in Misiones Province
- Mission Santa María la Major (1626), in Misiones Province
- Mission Candelaria
- Mission Corpus
- Mission San Carlos
- Mission San José
- Mission Martires
- Mission San Javier
- Mission Conception
- Mission Apostoles
- Mission Santo Tomé
- Mission Yapeiu
- Mission La Cruz
- Jesuit Block and Estancias of Córdoba (1615), in Córdoba

=== Bolivia ===
- Mission San Javier
- Mission Concepción
- Mission San Ignacio de Velasco
- Mission Santa Ana de Velasco
- Mission San Miguel de Velasco
- Mission San Rafael de Velasco
- Mission San José de Chiquitos
- Mission Santiago de Chiquitos
- Mission San Juan Bautista
- Mission Santo Corazón
- Mission San Ignacio de Zamucos

=== Brazil ===
Missions in the Banda Oriental in southern Brazil. The Banda Oriental was finally divided by the Treaty of San Ildefonso in 1777 between Spanish and Portuguese domains, the western portion becoming part of what is today state of Rio Grande do Sul, Brazil, the eastern portion becoming part of what is today Uruguay.

- Mission São Miguel das Missões (São Miguel Arcanjo) (1687), the chief mission of the seven in southern Brazil
- Mission Santo Ângelo (1706)
- Mission São Francisco de Borja (1682)
- Mission São Nicolau
- Mission São Luiz Gonzaga
- Mission São Lourenço Mártir (1690)
- Mission São João Batista (1697).

(Note: The above are Portuguese translations of the original names)

There were also 7 Spanish Missions (out of 30 or so in Viceroyalty of Peru east of the Andes) constructed along tributaries in the Upper Solimoes area of what later became State of Amazonas, Brazil, between 1686 and 1689 by Jesuit Padre Samuel Fritz among the Omagua indigenous peoples. Some of these were moved upstream into Peru due to pressure from the Bandeirantes slave raiders; the rest were destroyed by Portuguese forces between 1700 and 1711.

- Mission San Joaquin de los Omagua, later moved upstream into Loreto, Peru
- Mission San Pablo, later São Paulo de Olivença
- Mission San Cristoval
- Mission San Francisco Xavier
- Mission Nuestra Señora de Guadalupe (Amazonas)
- Mission Traguatua
- mission de aldea pequenas (27 small villages constituting one mission)

Spanish missions in the lower Amazon:

- Mission San Pedro, later the Portuguese fort of Tabatinga
- Nuestra Señora de las Nieves de Yurimaguas

=== Paraguay ===
- Mission San Ignacio Guazù (1609)
- Mission Santa Rosa de Lima (1698)
- Mission Santa Maria da Fé (1647)
- Mission San Cosme y Damian (1652), also an astronomic observatory
- Mission Santiago (1651)
- Mission Itapua (present-day Encarnación)
- Mission Jesus de Tavarangué (1685)
- Mission La Santisima Trinidad de Paraná (1706), near present-day Encarnación

== See also ==
- Jesuit Reductions
- Catholic Church and the Age of Discovery
- Spanish colonization of the Americas
- Guarani War
- The Mission (1986 film)
