= Jesuit Missions of La Santísima Trinidad de Paraná and Jesús de Tavarangue =

UNESCO World Heritage Site
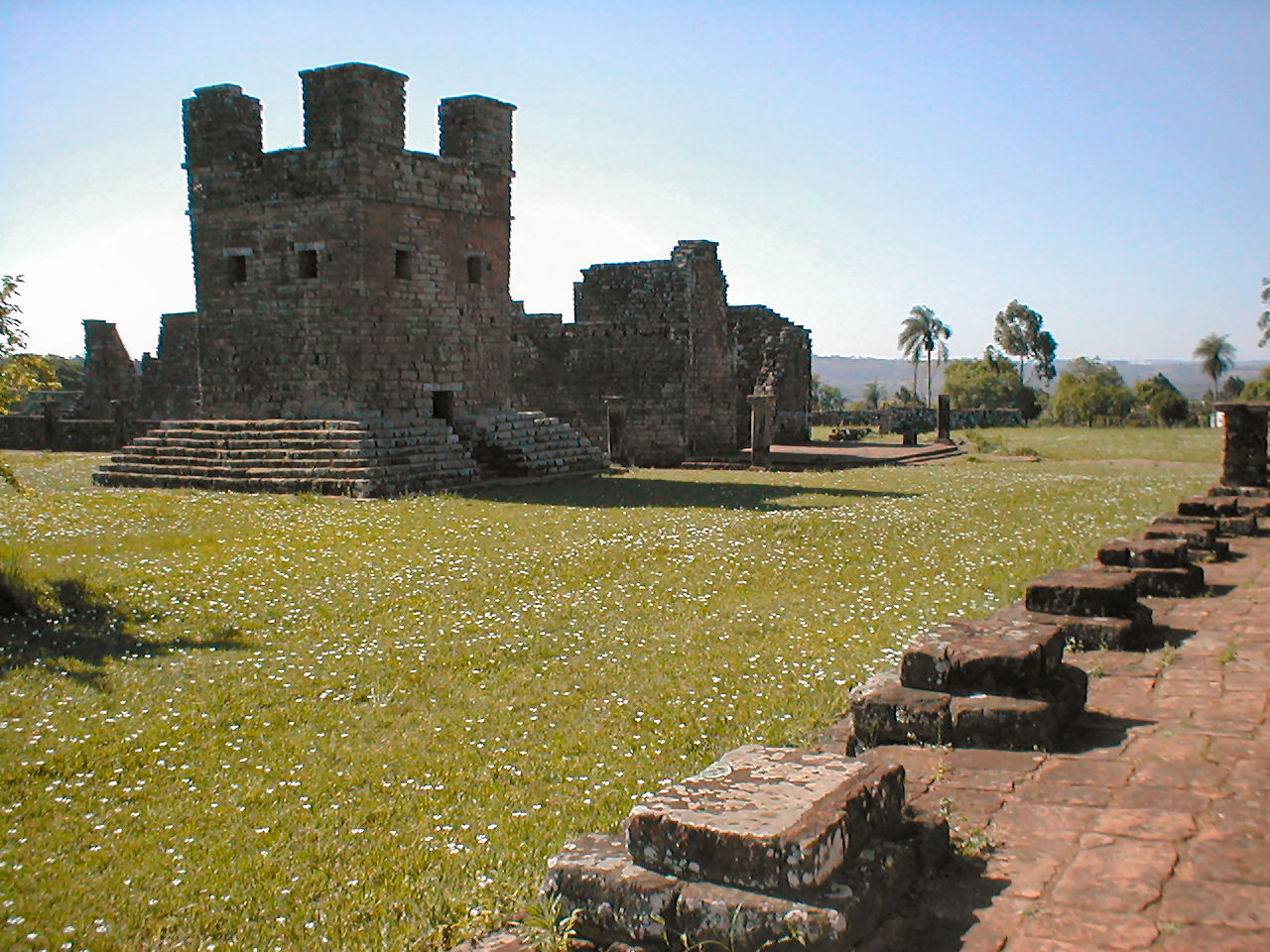
- Courtyard of the Trinidad ruins

- Location within Paraguay
- Location: Itapúa Department, Paraguay
- Includes: 1. Jesuit Mission of La Santísima Trinidad de Paraná; 2. Jesuit Mission of Jesús de Tavarangue
- Criteria: Cultural: (iv)
- Reference: 648
- Inscription: 1993 (17th Session)
- Area: 27.88 ha (68.9 acres)
- Buffer zone: 37.31 ha (92.2 acres)
- Coordinates: 27°8′S 55°42′W

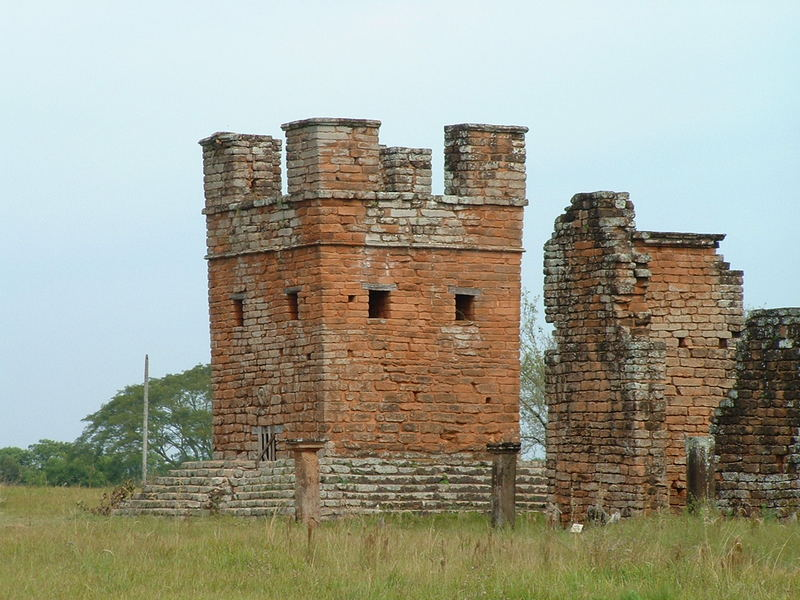

The Jesuit Missions of La Santísima Trinidad de Paraná and Jesús de Tavarangue (Spanish: Misiones Jesuíticas de La Santísima Trinidad de Paraná y Jesús de Tavarangue) are located in the Itapúa Department, Paraguay, and are religious missions that are still preserved and that were founded by the Jesuit missioners during the colonization of South America in the 17th century. These religious missions were created in 1609 and developed for 150 years. Both Jesuit missions were declared World Heritage Site by the UNESCO in 1993.

The Jesuit missions of Paraguay are considered some of the most impressive creations of the religious work of the Jesuits and are testimony of the historical richness of the country.

== History ==
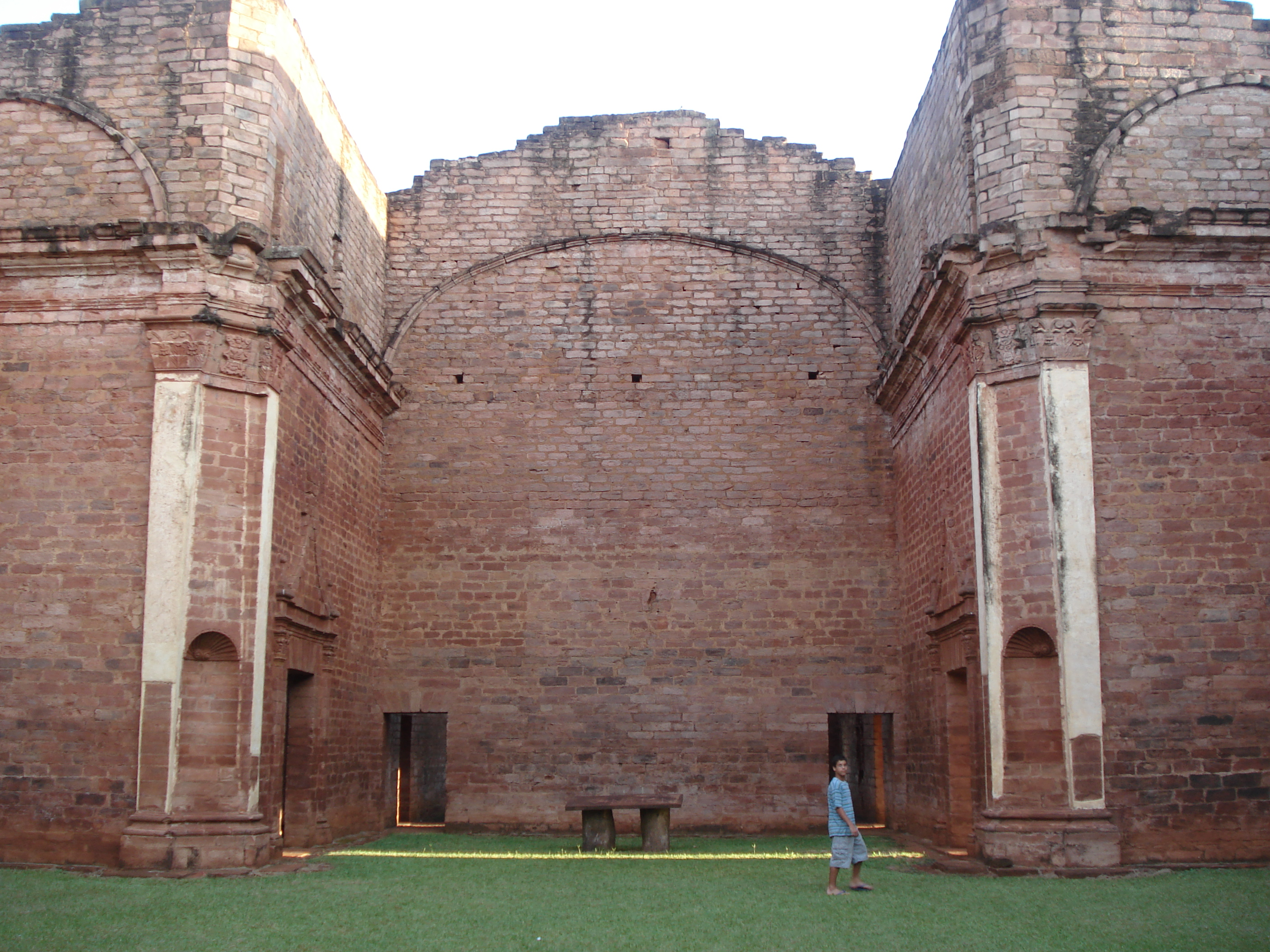
Main altar of Jesús de Tavarangue.

Aleixo Garcia encountered Paraguay in 1524. Its development in the political, economical and social matter was a slow process, scarred by armed conflicts between Spanish conquerors and natives, who fought to preserve their territory.

By 1590 the Spanish had founded 10 cities and 40 colonies in South America. The natives were forced to be at their service (Encomienda system).

The Spanish King tried to improve their quality of life by making some decrees for their protection but it was difficult to have a real system of control to make sure they were obeyed. The system of "Encomienda" gave rise to many native insurrections.

It was not until the Missions were established that there was a real improvement in the living conditions of the natives.

The first Jesuits arrived in Tucumán in 1586 and in 1587, by request of the Asunción's Bishop, Alonso Guerra.

The Jesuits started the evangelization and building of towns or Missions in the region of Misiones and Itapúa Departments in Paraguay.

The first thing they did was to form towns that were self-sufficient in the areas inhabited by the natives and a study of the Guaraní language they spoke to make a writing structure (because the Guaraní people did not write their language). The missioners not only imparted knowledge about religion but also determined the rules of public order, culture, education, and society, which had great influence in the later development of Paraguay. The natives, who were nomads and were not used to a structured life, founded themselves gathered in small communities in the forest. Near the Jesuit Missions were formed groups of 2000 or 3000 per town.

This group of missioners founded about 30 Missions in territories that nowadays belong to Paraguay, Brazil, Argentina, and Bolivia. Many of the constructions have been preserved and the ones that had been damaged were rebuilt.

== Santísima Trinidad del Paraná Ruins ==
The Santísima Trinidad del Paraná Mission is considered the biggest of all the missions. Natives that came from the missions of San Carlos (nowadays in the territory of Argentina) were its founders in 1712.

This mission has the biggest built temple among all the Jesuit Missions, with an altar carved from a single piece of stone. In it is represented the persecution of the natives at that time. It has a Central Square, the town's place of meeting, and a museum, located in the old sacristy, are the sculptures and a scale model of the mission.

These ruins are being restored and maintained constantly.

It is a Cultural Patrimony of Humankind.

== Jesús de Tavarangue Ruins ==
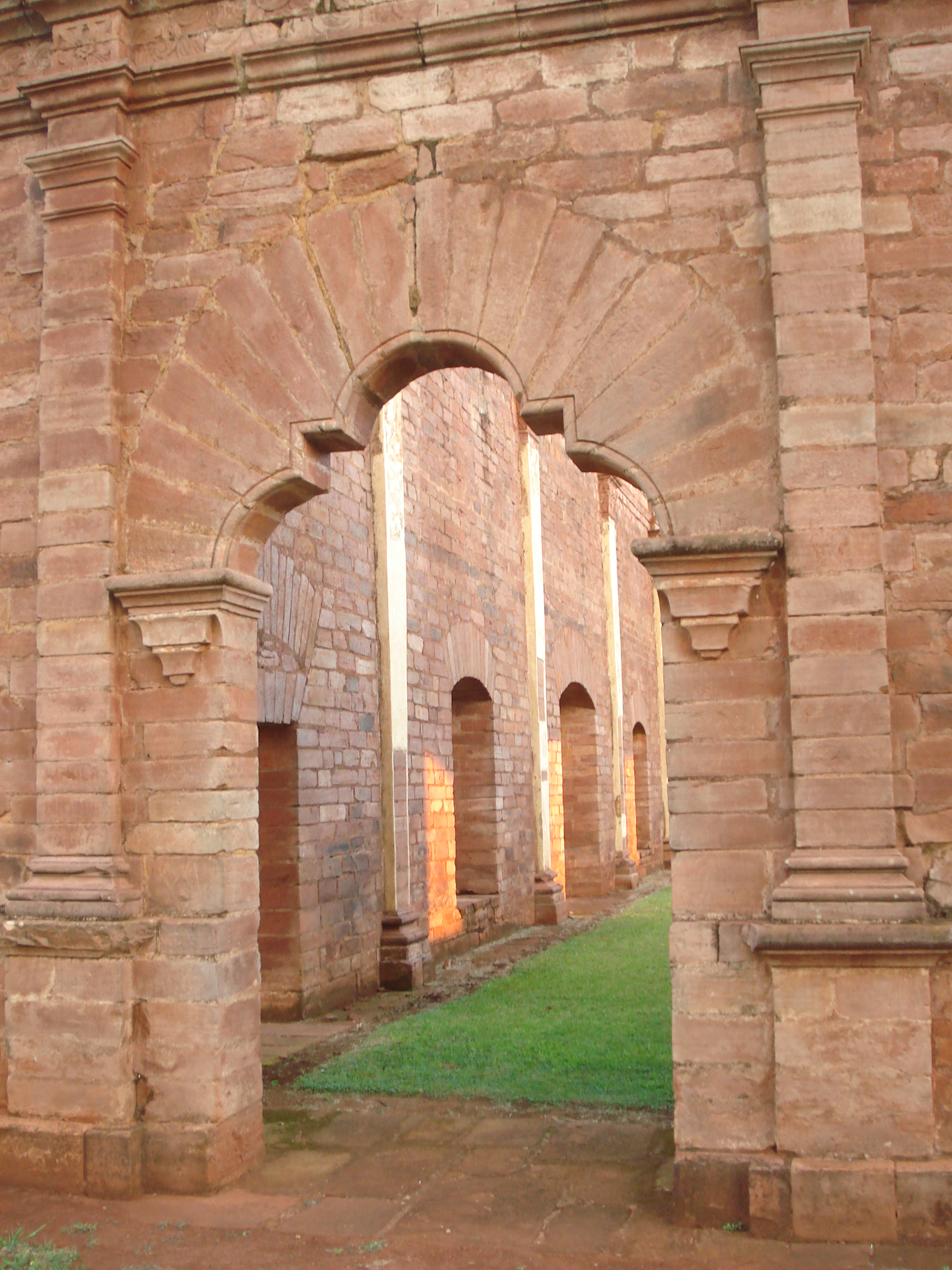
Access to the temple.

The church of Reducción de Jesús (Jesus’ Mission) was in the process of being built at the time that the Jesuits were expelled from Río de la Plata Province. It would have been one of the biggest churches of that time, with a central structure of 70 meters long and 24 meters wide.

It would have been a replica of the Sanctuary of Loyola, in Spain. The three front access doors are very impressive.

UNESCO declared it Cultural Patrimony of Humankind in 1993. It is considered one of the most important edifications of the 30 Jesuits towns in the region.

The stone pulpit, the friezes of angels, the rose-shaped carved stone in the lintels in the doors, and the bell tower stand out in its architecture.

The ruins of these missions show a way of life and education marked by its singular style.

== Access to the ruins ==
The ruins in Paraguay are possibly the best preserved, and include Jesús, San Cosme y Damián and Trinidad Missions.

To get to these places it is necessary to take Route No. 6 from Encarnación. The entries to all the missions are signaled on the route.

The access to the ruins of Trinidad is located 700 meters from Route No. 6 in “km 31”, about 1 kilometer after, is the access to the ruins of Jesús de Tavarangue. The site of the ruins of Jesús is 12 km from this access point and can be easily reached by taxi or bus.
