= Ruins of Jesús de Tavarangue =

Coordinates: 27°03′00″S 55°47′24″W

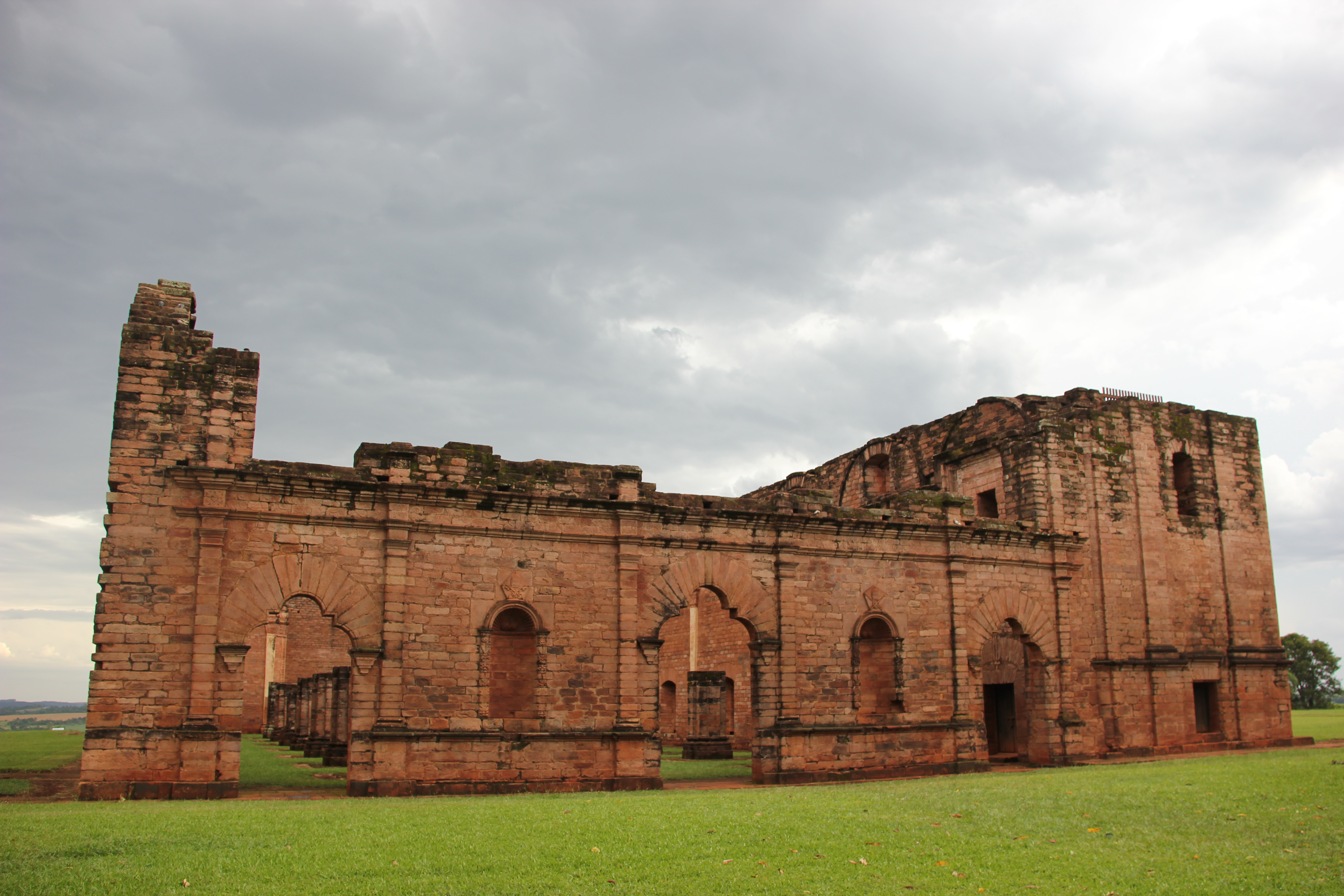
Ruins of Jesús

Jesús de Tavarangue was a Jesuit Reduction located in what is now Itapua, Paraguay. The ruins of the mission, together with those of Trinidad were designated a UN World Heritage Site designated in 1993.

== History ==
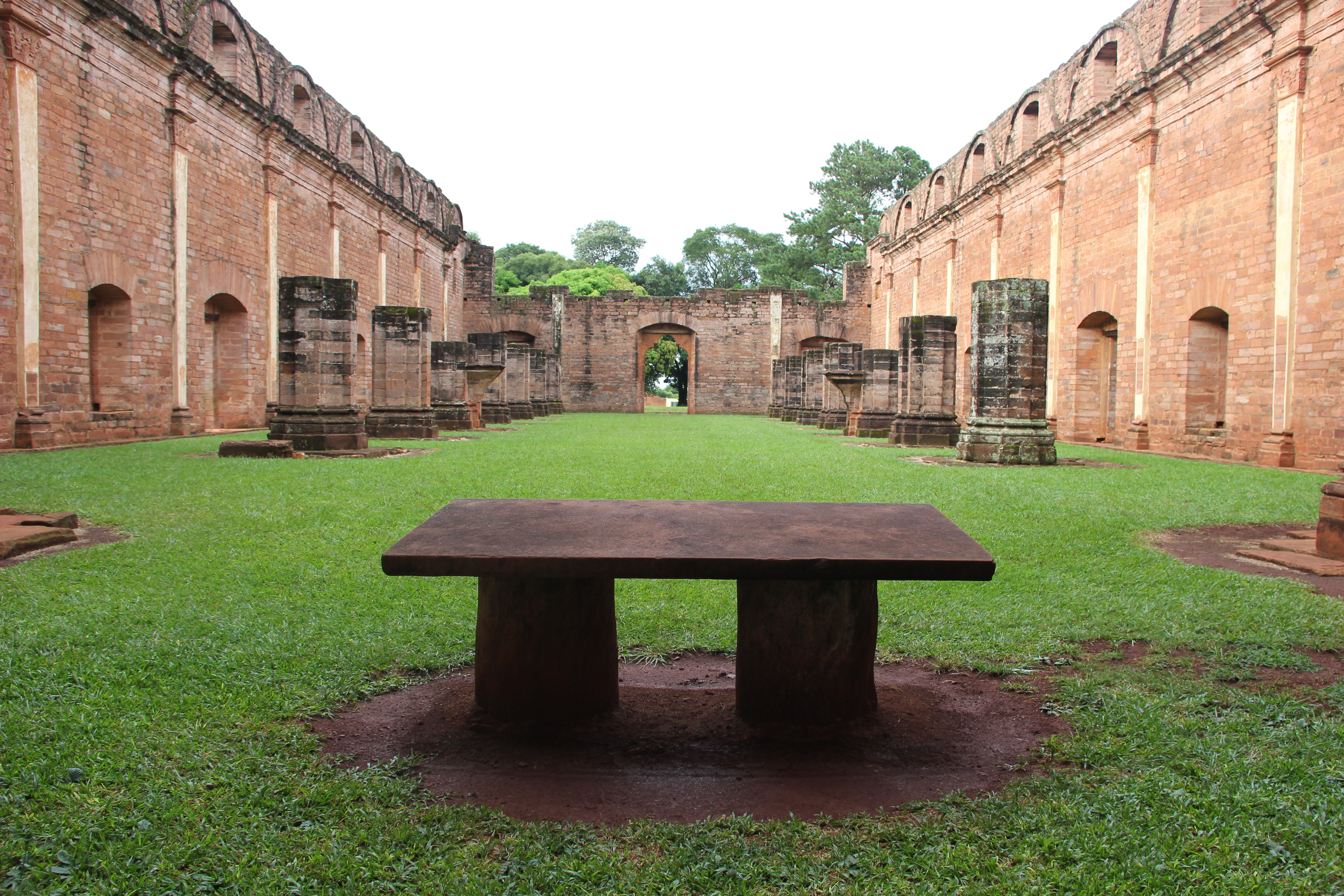
Main altar of Jesús de Tavarangue

The Reducción de Jesús was initially founded in what is now Alto Parana in 1685 near the Monday river. The mission was relocated several times before arriving in its current location in 1760. Construction of the mission was not completed by the time the Jesuit order was expelled from Paraguay in 1767. The massive mission church was being built as a replica of the Church of Saint Ignatius of Loyola in Italy. It would have been one of the biggest churches of that time, with a central structure of 70 by 24 metres (230 by 79 ft).

== Visiting the ruins ==
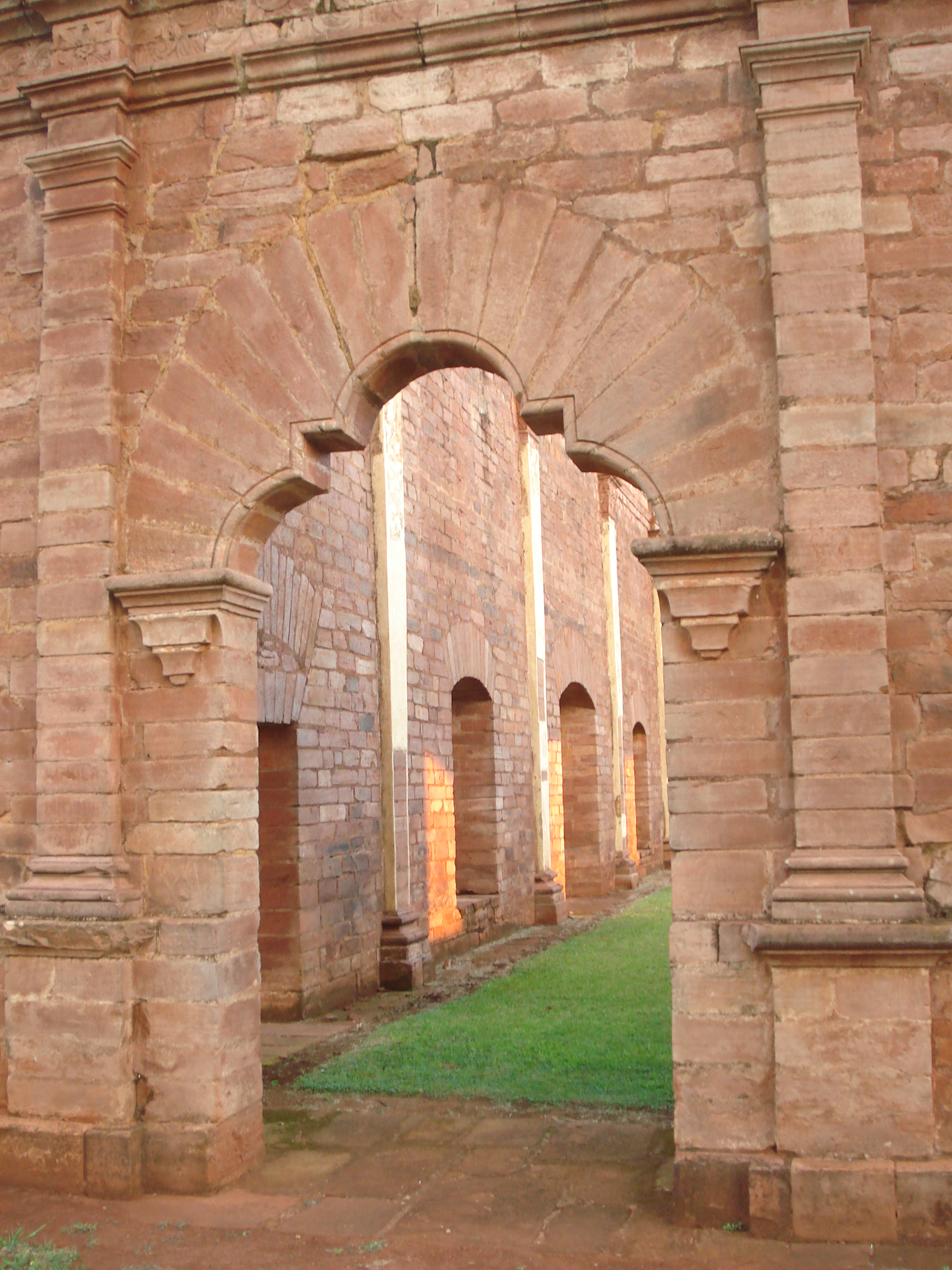
Access to the temple

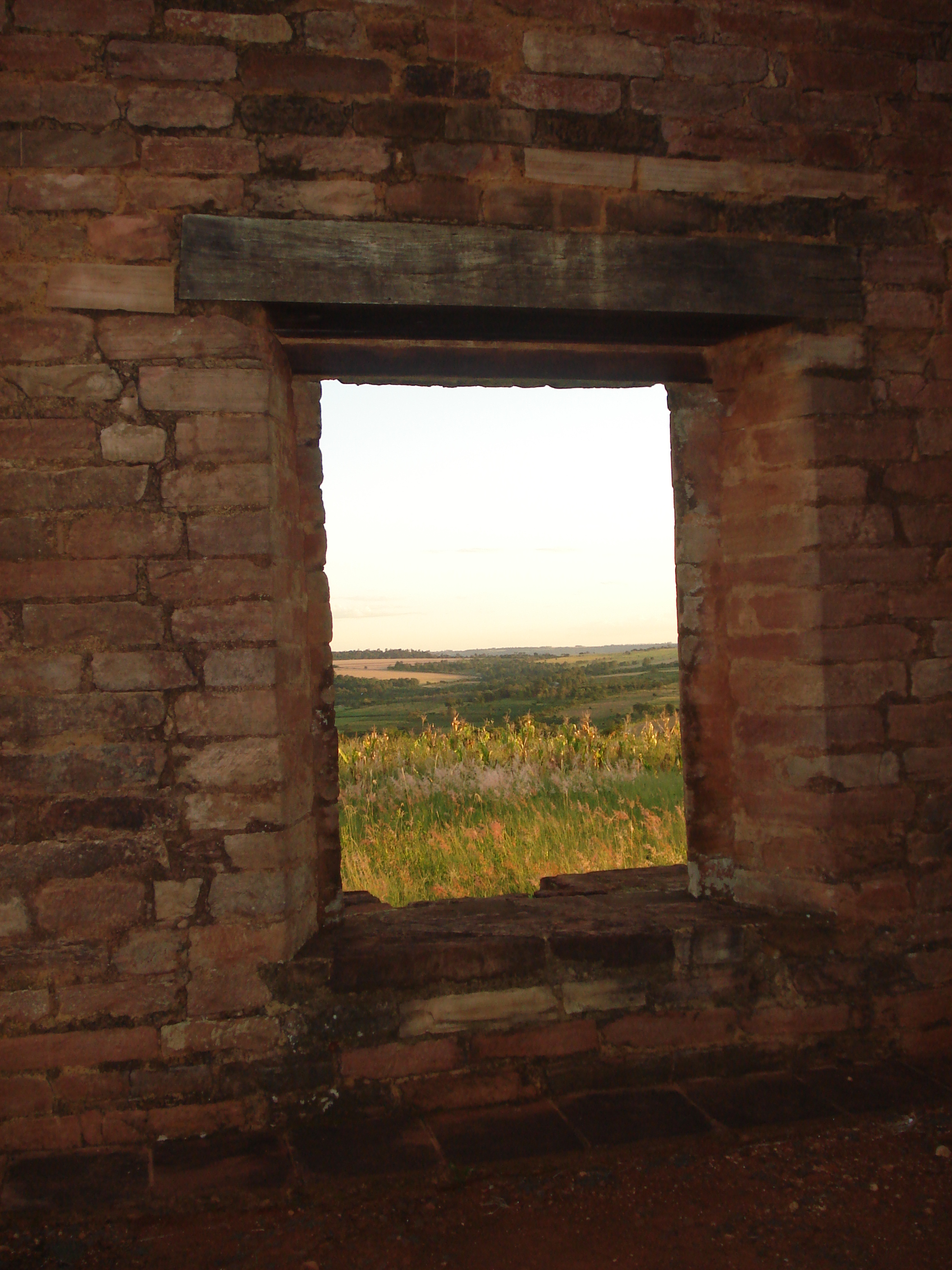
View from inside

The Jesuit Ruins in Paraguay are possibly the best preserved in South America and include the Jesús, San Cosme y Damián and Trinidad Missions.

Route No. 6 from Encarnación passes between the ruins of Jesus and Trinidad. Signs mark entrances to both sites. A paved road about 100m from the entrance to Trinidad at “km 31” from Encarnación allows access to the ruins of Jesús de Tavarangue.

== See also ==
- Jesuit Reductions
- Spanish missions in South America
- La Santísima Trinidad de Paraná
- Jesuit Missions of La Santísima Trinidad de Paraná and Jesús de Tavarangue
- History of Paraguay
- Guarani people
- List of Jesuit sites
