= Lizárraga =

Lizárraga (Castilianized) or Lizarraga (in Basque) is a surname of Basque origin, meaning 'grove of ash trees'. It shows a Basque language variant, Leizarraga, as well as others developed a posteriori in other languages, mainly Spanish, e.g. Lejarraga. Notable people with the surname include:

- Agustín Lizárraga (1865–1912), Peruvian explorer and farmer
- Héctor Lizárraga (1966), Mexican boxer
- Jaime Lizárraga, American political advisor and government official
- José Enrique Reina Lizárraga (1969), Mexican politician
