= São Lourenço Mártir Archaeological Site =

Ruins from the Jesuit reduction, located in São Luiz Gonzaga, Rio Grande do Sul

- Sítio Arqueológico de São Lourenço Mártir (Portuguese)
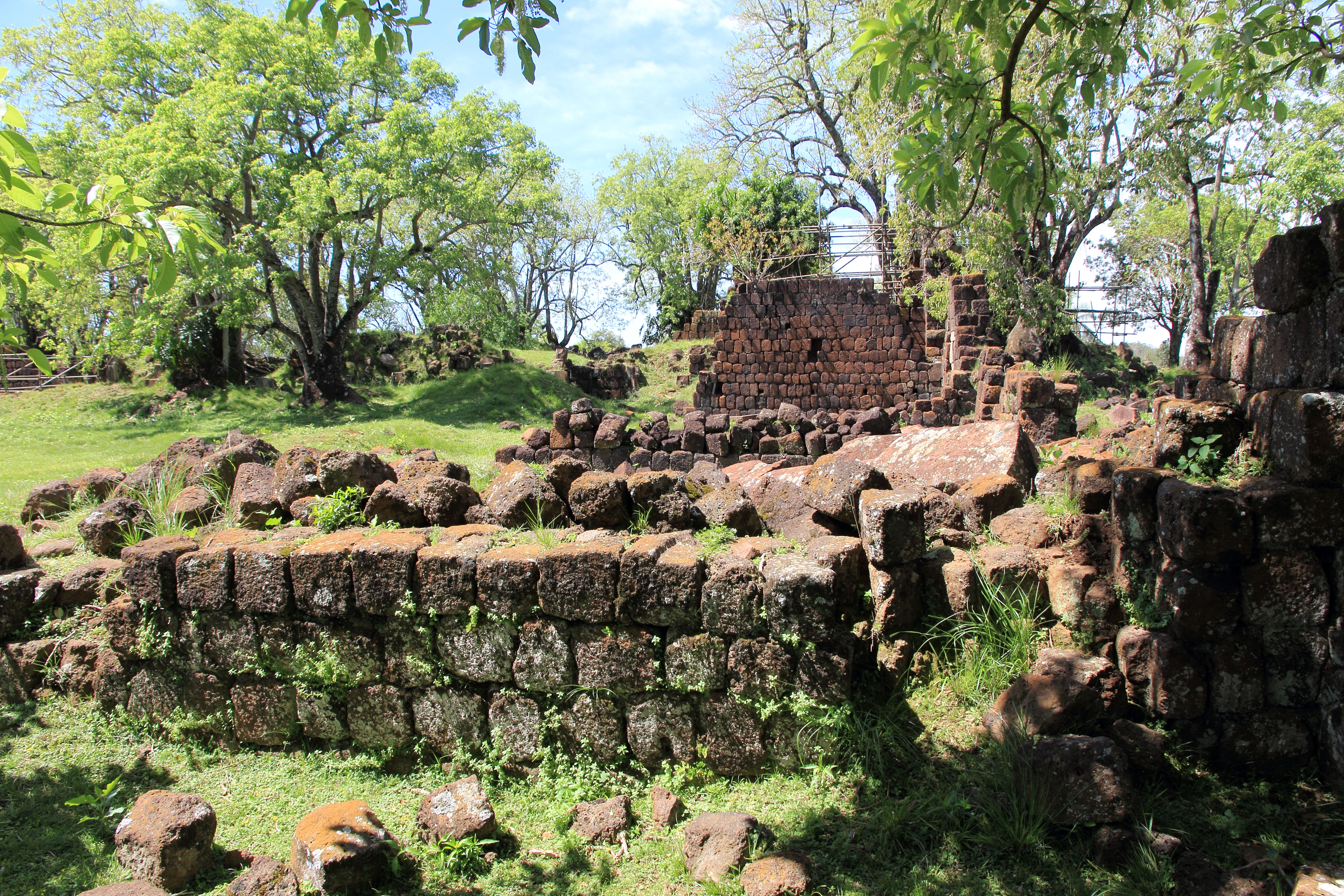
- View of part of the ruins of São Lourenço Mártir in 2013.

- Location of the archaeological site in Rio Grande de Sul, Brazil.
- 28°27′44″S 54°42′35″W
- Location: São Luiz Gonzaga, Rio Grande do Sul, Brazil

History
- Abandonment: 1750
- Founded: 1690, by Bernardo De La Veja

Site notes
- Governing body: IPHAN

The São Lourenço Mártir Archaeological Site consists of ruins from the Jesuit reduction of the same name, which was part of the Sete Povos das Missões. It is located in the district of São Lourenço das Missões, in the municipality of São Luiz Gonzaga, Rio Grande do Sul, approximately 30 kilometers from the main town, accessible via the BR-285 highway. The São Lourenço Mártir reduction was founded in 1690 and became one of the largest reductions among the Sete Povos, with a population of nearly 7,000 indigenous inhabitants.

At the archaeological site, visitors can explore the remains of the church, cemetery, school, and farmhouse of the former reduction, all partially covered by vegetation. Near the entrance, there is an exhibition showcasing the results of the archaeological research conducted at São Lourenço.

== History ==
Starting in 1609, missionaries from the Society of Jesus began catechizing the Indigenous peoples of the Province of Paraguay. The Spanish Empire aimed to conquer and colonize the lands of the Platine Basin, primarily to convert Indigenous populations to Christianity. Between 1609 and 1706, the Jesuits expanded their mission to the Tape region in what is now Rio Grande do Sul. The Tape Reductions are associated with the first phase of missionary activity, spanning from 1626 to 1637. During these 11 years, the reductions struggled to develop due to Indigenous resistance. In 1641, the missionary priests withdrew from Rio Grande do Sul following the Battle of M'Bororé, fought between the Guarani and the bandeirantes.

In 1682, the Jesuit priests returned to the region to establish the Sete Povos of the Missions, aiming to secure land for the Spanish Crown. These settlements mark the second phase of missionary activity. The first settlement of this phase was São Francisco de Borja (1682), followed by the reconstruction of São Nicolau and São Miguel Arcanjo. The reductions of São Luiz Gonzaga, São Lourenço Mártir (1690), São João Batista (1697), and Santo Ângelo Custódio (1706), the last of the Sete Povos, were subsequently founded.

São Lourenço Mártir was founded in 1690 with Indigenous people from the Argentine reduction of Santa María la Mayor, descendants of those who had fled Guaíra. They settled in the area under the leadership of Father Bernardo de la Vega. By 1731, the reduction had approximately 6,400 inhabitants, making it one of the largest settlements among the Sete Povos.

The Sete Povos was one of the few missions successfully implemented. However, conflicts frequently arose among the Indigenous peoples, missionaries, and landowners—who, unlike the Jesuits, sought to exploit the Indigenous population for slave labor—hindering the settlement's development. The economic activities of the Rio Grande do Sul reductions provide significant evidence of the Jesuits' success. Among the key activities, yerba mate production and livestock development were particularly important during this period. Yerba mate, promoted by the priests as a substitute for alcoholic beverages, became widely adopted within the Missions for this purpose.

The priests were responsible for maintaining the reduction, which required them to diversify their work and adapt their services to meet the community's needs. A significant challenge in this process was the pre-Jesuit Guarani tribal culture, which valued practices such as gift-giving and showed little interest in repetitive or labor-intensive tasks. To address this, the missionaries developed strategies to motivate the Guarani to engage in daily activities. One common approach was to introduce competitions, including games, teamwork, and championships. Additionally, the priests utilized the Guarani's traditional sense of collectivism in a constructive manner, leveraging it to foster cooperation and communal effort.

The Jesuits reoriented indigenous labor, making it a specialized workforce. The missionary economy was characterized by self-sufficiency and surplus production. In this way, the civilizing process imposed by the Jesuits was facilitated. The communities of the Sete Povos became pioneers with a unique model of social organization, which was based on a cooperative structure, with the interconnection of a network of roads and river ports.

== Jesuits ==
The Society of Jesus was founded in August 1534 by St. Ignatius of Loyola and other students from the University of Paris, with the goal of serving the Catholic Church. In 1540, Pope Paul II officially recognized the Society as a new Catholic Order. Since its establishment, the Jesuits have been instrumental in founding colleges and universities and have led or participated in initiatives aimed at spreading Christianity to non-Christian regions. This mission was largely carried out during the period of European maritime expansion, primarily driven by Portuguese and Spanish efforts.

The primary purpose of the Society of Jesus was to counter the Protestant movement, which led to its establishment during the Counter-Reformation. Its main priorities included missionary activity and religious education. In the case of the missions in South America, this involved a complex coordination of political, institutional, and logistical efforts. The Society of Jesus also extended its influence to regions such as the Indies and the Far East. Today, it has over 24,000 members operating in 120 countries.

In Portuguese America, Jesuit activities began in 1549 and became widely recognized through the letters exchanged between Jesuit priests Manoel da Nóbrega and José de Anchieta in the mid-16th century. These letters detailed their interactions with the Indigenous peoples of the colony and their efforts to convert them to Christianity. The Jesuit missions started well before the establishment of the Thirty Peoples of the Missions. This early activity is associated with the first missionary phase (1626–1637) in the Tape region.

== Decline of the Sete Povos das Missões ==
The Guaraní War refers to the series of military conflicts that occurred between 1754 and 1756, involving the Guaraní people and Portuguese and Spanish forces. These conflicts followed the signing of the Treaty of Madrid in 1750 by Portugal and Spain. The war took place in the southwestern region of present-day Brazil and is regarded as the most significant Indigenous uprising against European colonizers in Brazilian history. One of its primary causes was the territorial disputes between Portugal and Spain during this period.

The Treaty of Madrid marked the division of land in South America between Portugal and Spain. It stipulated that the region of the Sete Povos das Missões, located in Rio Grande do Sul and then under Spanish control, should be transferred to Portuguese rule. In exchange, Spain would receive the Colonia del Sacramento. However, the Jesuits in the Sete Povos reductions opposed this agreement, and in 1754, the first conflict of the Guaraní War erupted between the Portuguese forces and the Indigenous people armed by the missionaries. Spanish troops joined the battle on the side of Portugal in an attempt to enforce the terms of the Treaty of Madrid.

The conflict resulted in the deaths of more than 20,000 Guaraní people from the Sete Povos region. The reductions were destroyed, and the Jesuits' influence in the southern region of Brazil was significantly diminished.

== Architecture ==
The settlement followed an urban plan established by law, with few variations between the reductions. The layout consisted of a main street leading to the church, which was the central building of the reduction. In the square at the center, military parades, religious reenactments, and festivals were held. Around the square, blocks of Indigenous houses were arranged in an orderly manner, allowing for the planned growth of the settlement.

Next to the church were the buildings used by the entire community. The priests' house, the workshops, and the village school were located on one side of the church. The houses and institutions had large spaces and extensive internal courtyards. On the opposite side of the church were the cemetery and the cotiguaçu (shelter for orphans and widows). Behind the church was the priests' farm, where vegetables and fruit trees were cultivated.

On the outskirts of the reductions, there were water sources, potteries for making clay bricks (called adobe), and roof tiles for building houses. There were also tanneries, dams, chapels, estancias, and herb farms. Some research and archaeological findings continue to show evidence of a sewage and water network that supplied the reductions.

Today, only a few walls of the church remain intact, but they are still able to convey the size and grandeur of the place. The building is approximately 80 meters long and 40 meters wide. In addition to the large space, five gilded altars and numerous gold, silver, and bronze objects displayed the material wealth of the reduction. The stones were hand-carved, and most of them are still preserved today.

== Artistic manifestations ==
The interaction between Christian and Indigenous cultures is evident in missionary art. Christians used artistic expressions to spread their religious values, making art and religion closely intertwined. The blending of these two distinct cultures led to the creation of a unique historical development, where neither culture remained unchanged. Both Indigenous people and missionaries altered their perceptions of the world and their ways of life.

The Jesuits placed great importance on artistic education, and under their guidance, the Indigenous people expressed their gifts and talents through art. During the period of the missions in Rio Grande do Sul, the Indigenous people created numerous works in wood, including polychrome cedar images of Nossa Senhora da Conceição and São Lourenço. They also produced sandstone sculptures and large church bells. Using the techniques taught by the Jesuits, the Indigenous people developed a missionary iconography that was characteristic of the region. The term "missionary baroque art" was coined to describe this unique style developed in the reductions.

In addition to the visual arts, the Jesuits also fostered the rhythmic arts, in which the Guaraní excelled. Those who dedicated themselves to music, whether as singers or dancers, became true professionals, practicing daily for years. Some Indigenous people, instead of working in the fields or the workshops, began practicing singing, music, and dance from the age of six or seven. Singing, music, dancing, and melodrama were the main forms of entertainment during the many festivities held by the community.

== Present days ==
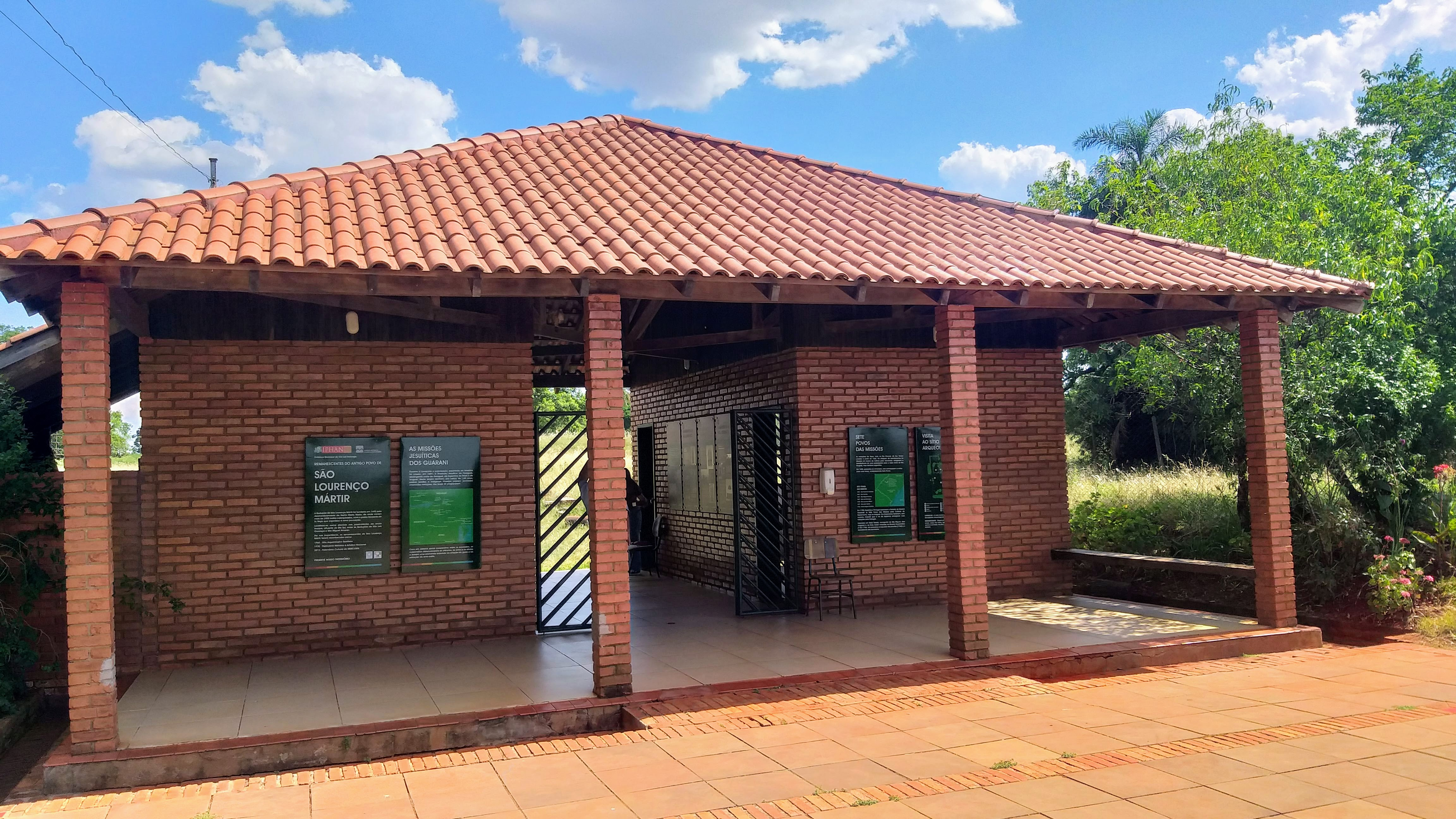
Visitor Support Center, located at the entrance to the site.

A few years ago, spaces were discovered where the local population stored rainwater, functioning as a kind of cistern. Work is currently underway to restore this water preservation area. The São Lourenço Archaeological Site is managed by the National Institute of Historic and Artistic Heritage (IPHAN), which has also preserved the cemetery used by recent communities in the area.

IPHAN collaborates with local communities, universities, municipal and state governments, as well as private institutions, with the goal of conserving, protecting, and enhancing the sites and their historical significance.

The archaeological sites of São Miguel Arcanjo, São Nicolau, São João Batista, and São Lourenço Mártir, all located in Rio Grande do Sul and once part of the reductions of the Sete Povos das Missões, are now protected by the Federal Government and recognized as National Heritage Sites.

== Gallery ==
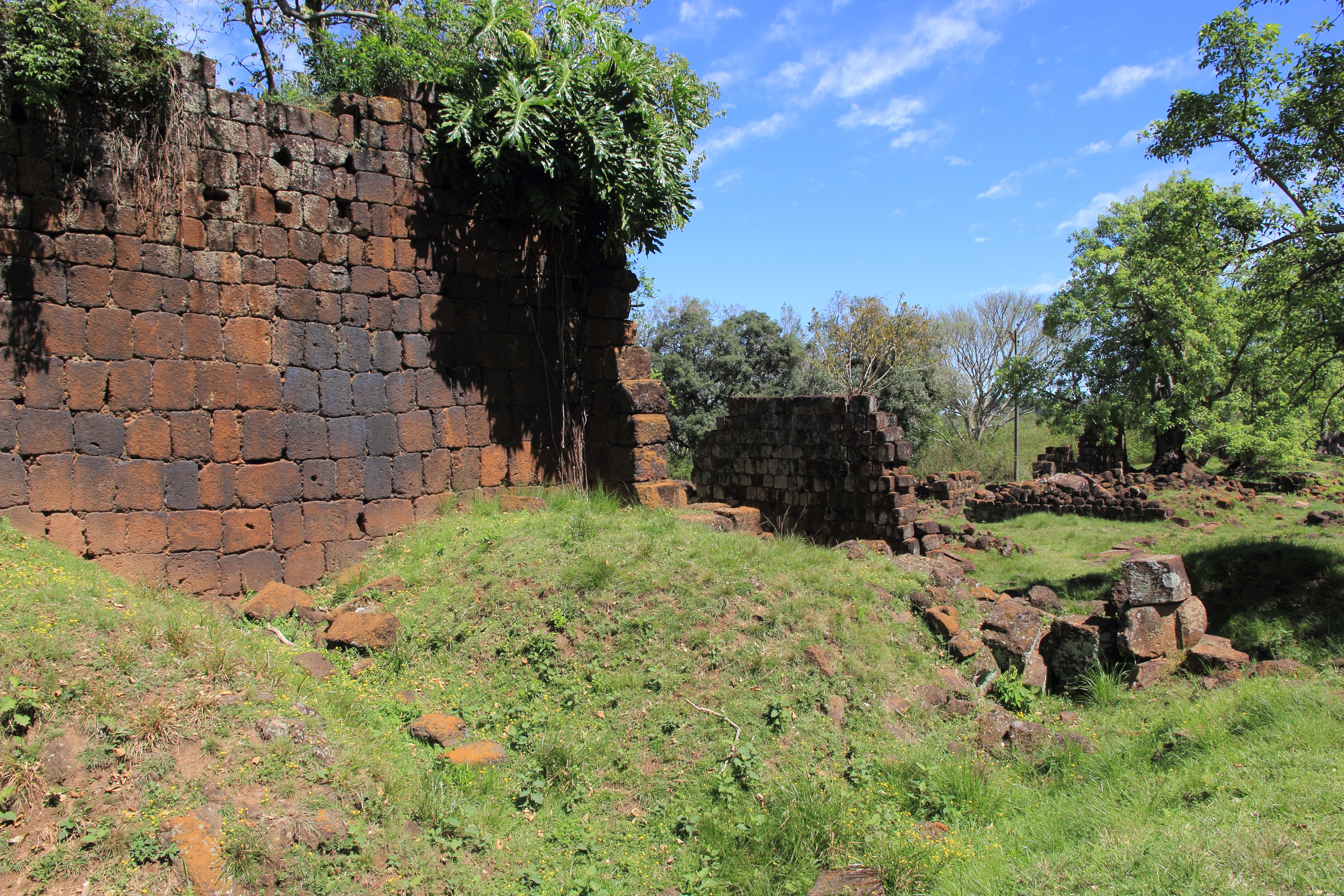
Part of the ruins of the São Lourenço Mártir Archaeological Site located in São Luiz Gonzaga, RS.

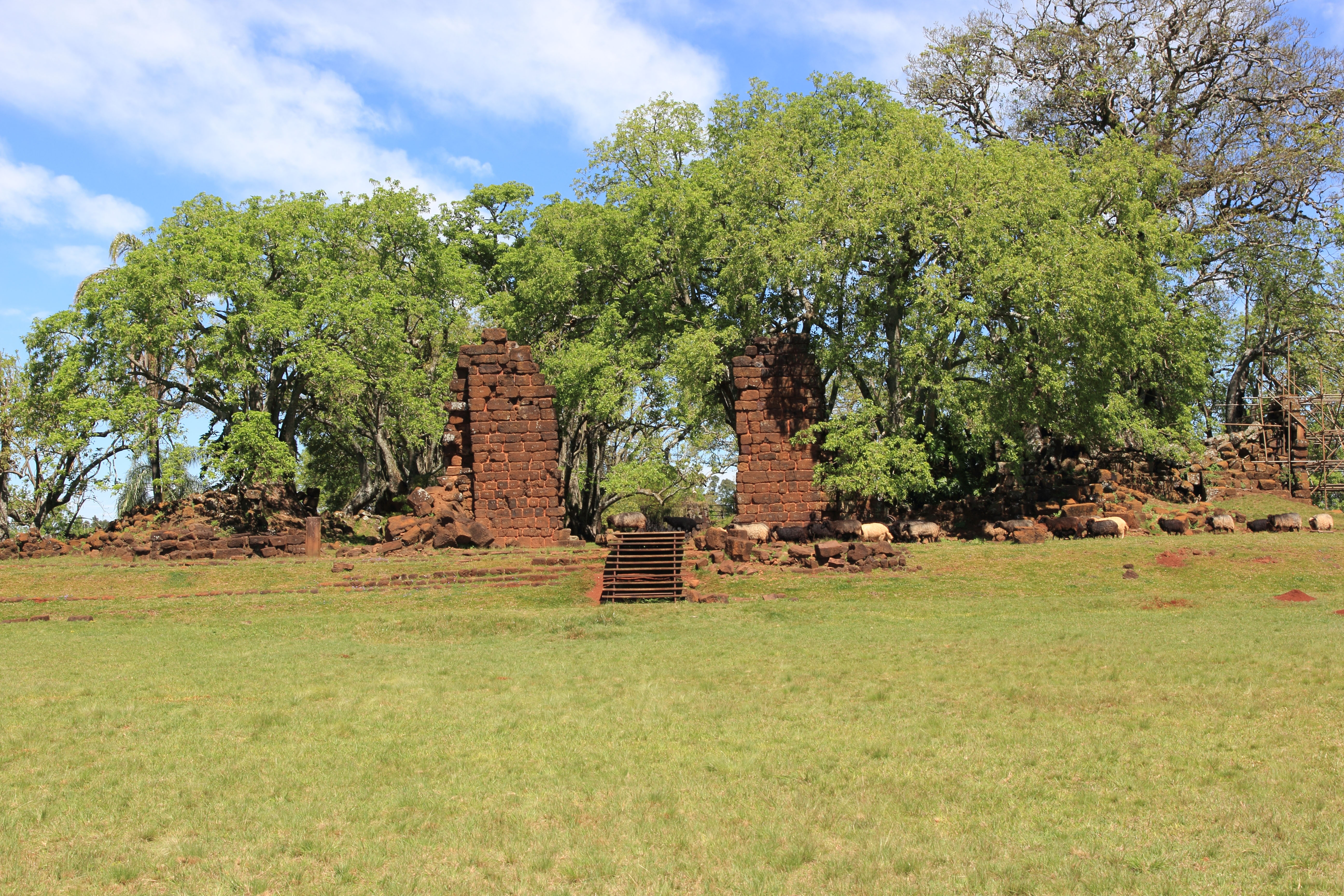
Part of the ruins of the site.

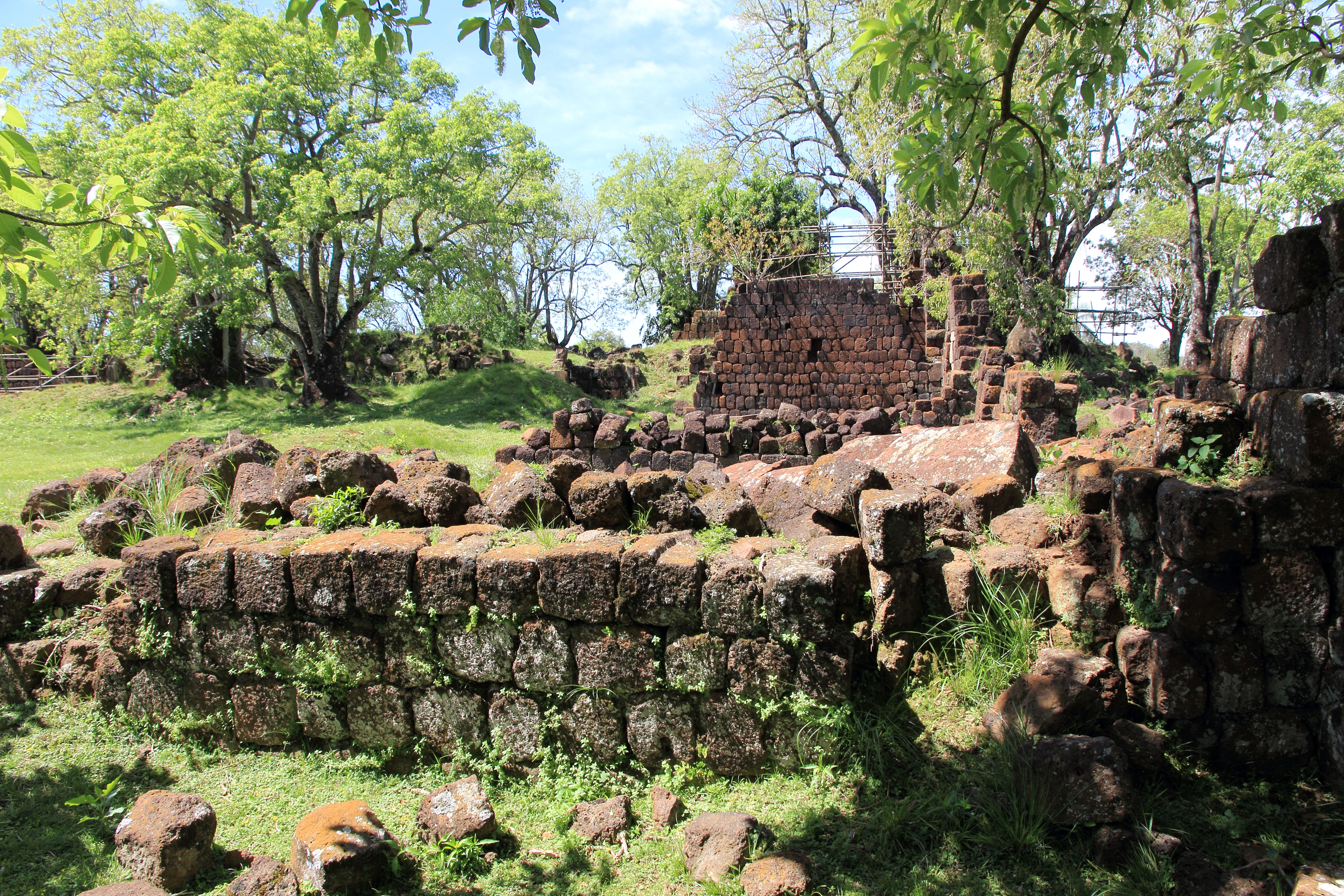
Part of the ruins of the site.

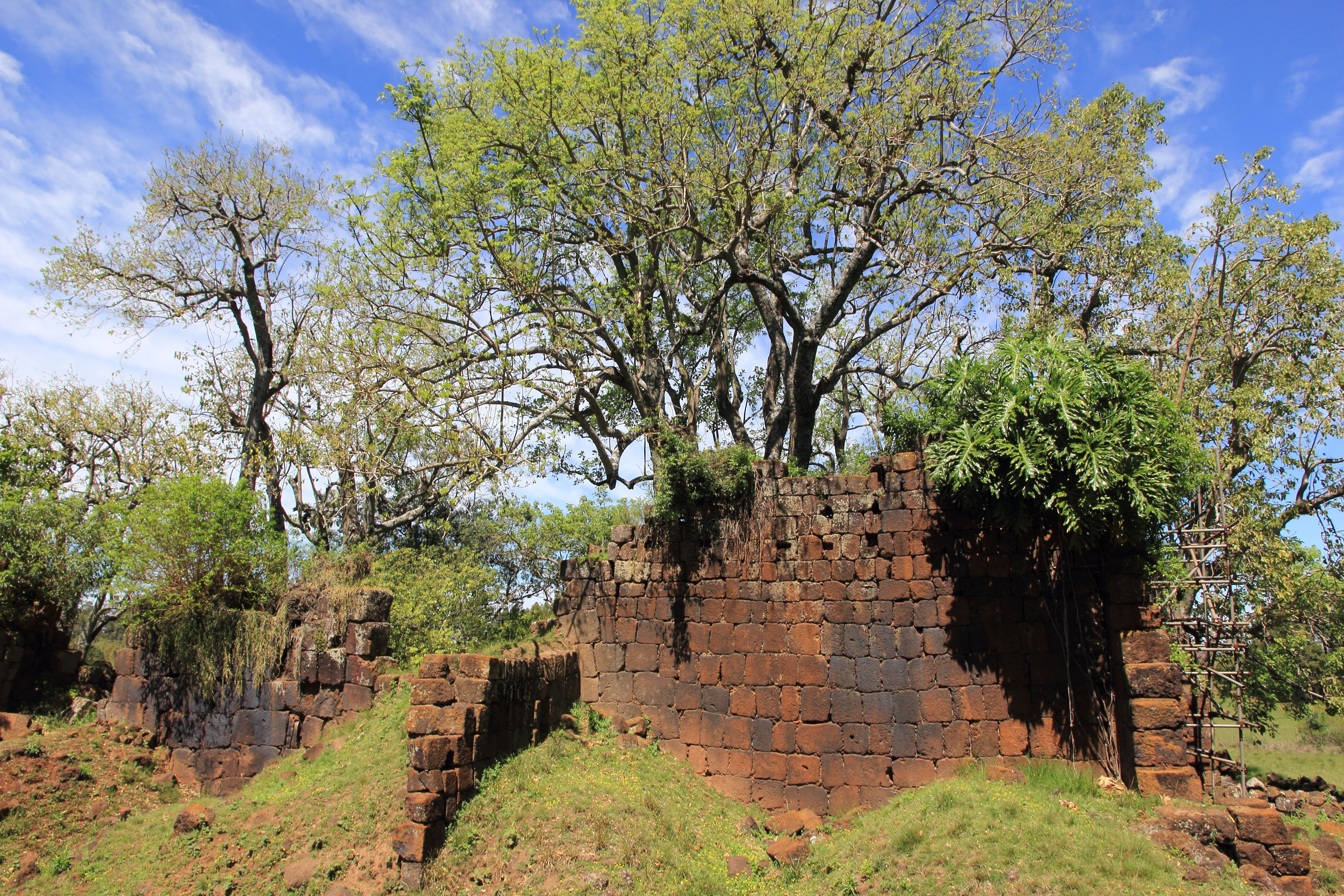
Part of the ruins of the site.

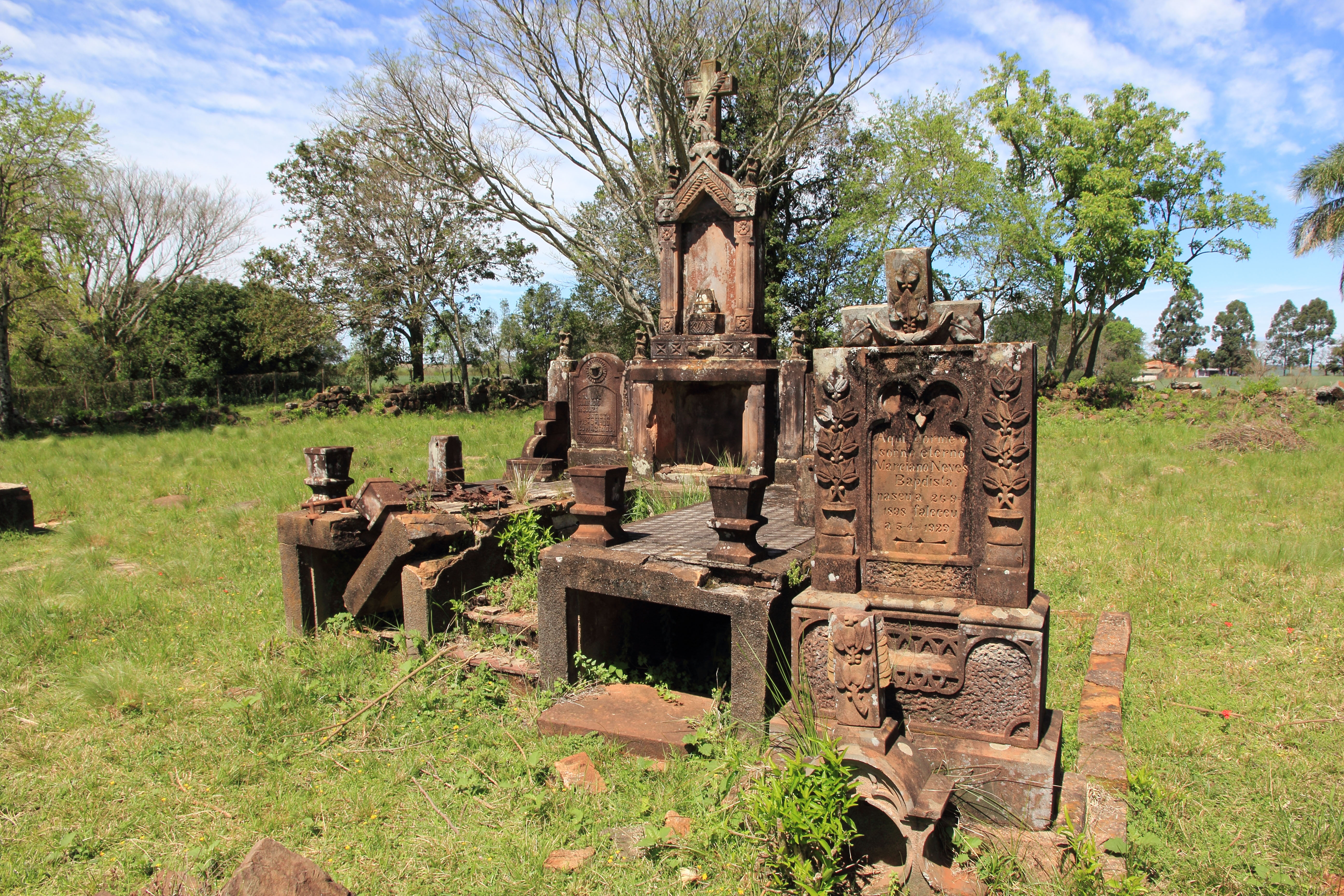
Part of the ruins of the site.

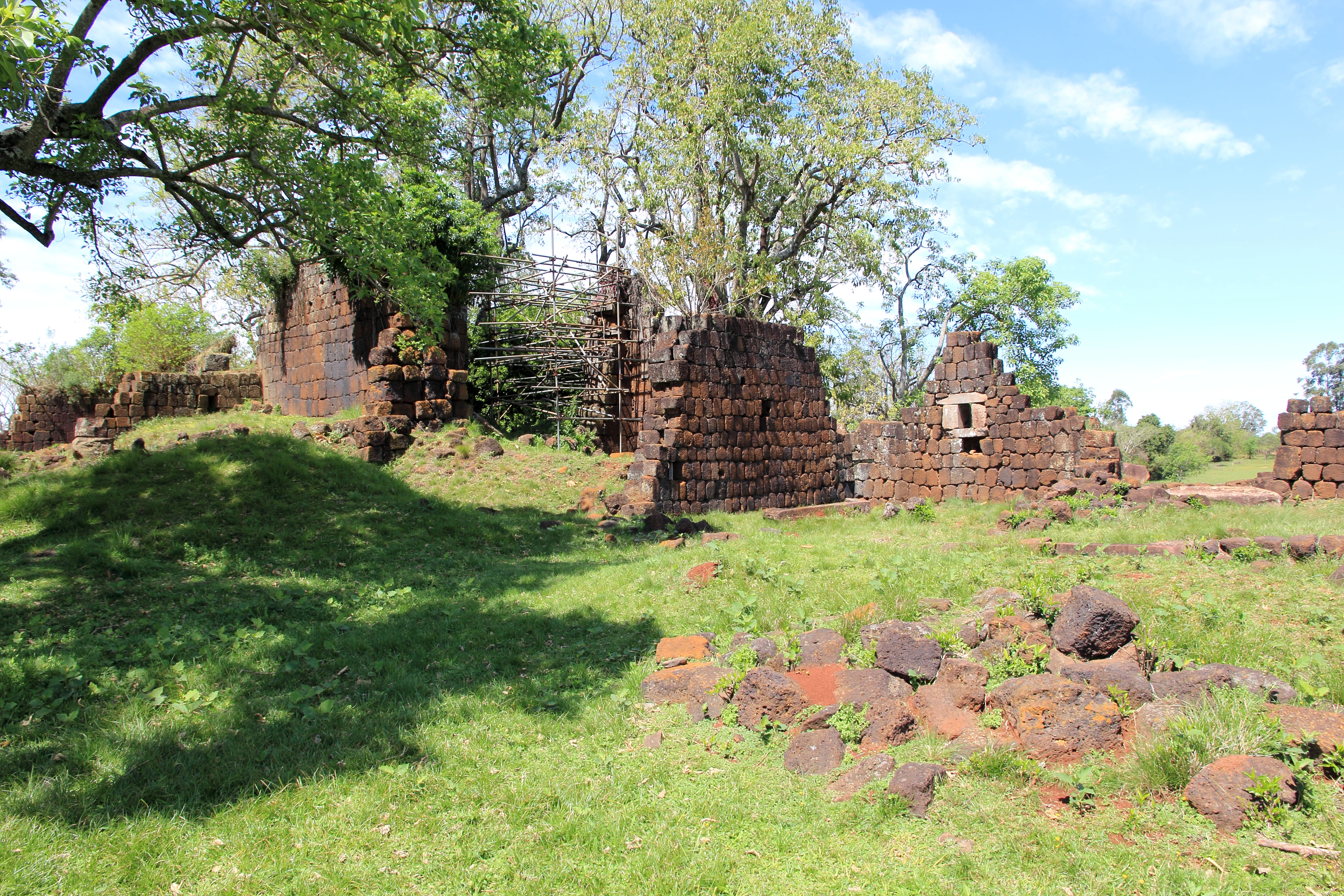
Part of the ruins of the site.

== See also ==
- Misiones Orientales
