= La Santísima Trinidad de Paraná =

Jesuit Mission of La Santísima Trinidad de Paraná
UNESCO World Heritage Site
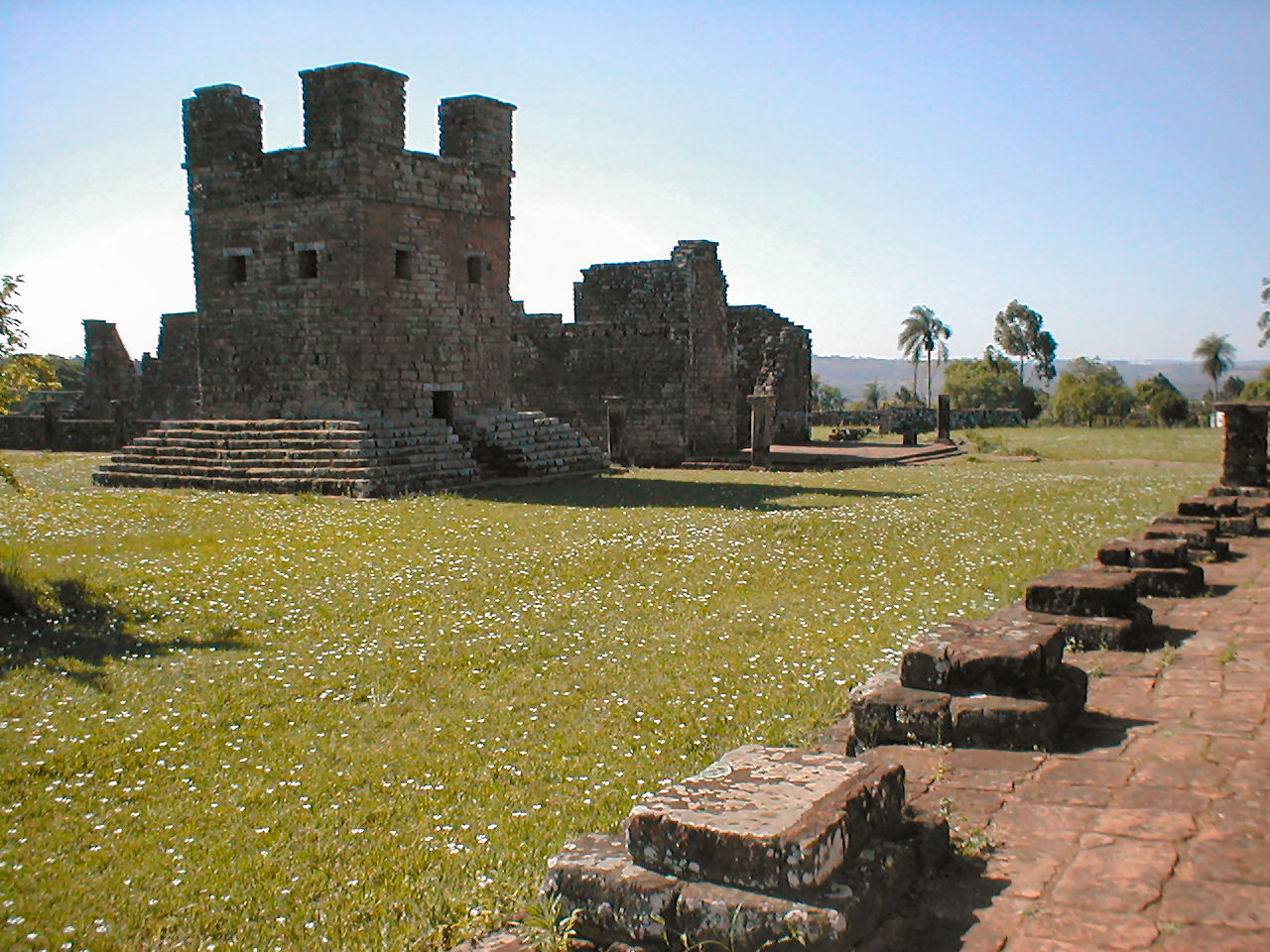

- Location within Paraguay
- Location: Itapúa Department, Paraguay
- Part of: Jesuit Missions of La Santísima Trinidad de Paraná and Jesús de Tavarangue
- Criteria: Cultural: (iv)
- Reference: 648-001
- Inscription: 1993 (17th Session)
- Area: 12 ha (30 acres)
- Buffer zone: 17.3 ha (43 acres)
- Coordinates: 27°07′59″S 55°42′00″W

La Santísima Trinidad de Paraná, or the Most Holy Trinity of Paraná, is the name of a former Jesuit reduction in Paraguay. It is an example of one of the many Jesuit reductions, small colonies established by the missionaries in various locations in South America, such as Brazil, Argentina and Paraguay throughout the 17th and 18th century. These missions were built as self-contained societies that existed outside of regular Spanish colonial life that integrated indigenous populations with Christian faith.

La Santisima Trinidad de Paraná, often referred to by the locals as simply the "ruins of Trinidad" was one of the last of the Jesuit reducciones to be built in the Paraná River area encompassing southern Paraguay and northern Argentina. It is also the most highly accessible and the most visited of the historical sites today. Located near the modern day city of Encarnación, Trinidad was originally constructed in 1706, the intended self-sufficient city came complete with a central meeting plaza, where most of the celebrations, such as Mass and matrimony were celebrated, a large church meetinghouse, a school, several workshops, a museum and housing for the local Indian population.

The Jesuit expulsion from Spanish colonies in 1768 eventually led to the abandonment of Trinidad and the rest of the reducciones, which were left to decay, and later on, (in mainly the church structure where the saints' statues were decapacitated) were massacred in search for gold in the structure by the other Indian population of this region. Owing in part to its relatively recent construction, Trinidad bore the weathering of time fairly well, and modern historical societies have maintained the current, well-preserved state of the ruins to this day. It has also been named one of two UNESCO World Heritage Sites in Paraguay.

== See also ==
- Guarani people
- History of Paraguay
- Jesuit Missions of La Santísima Trinidad de Paraná and Jesús de Tavarangue
- List of Jesuit sites
- Ruins of Jesús de Tavarangue
- Spanish missions in South America
