= Tourism in Argentina =

Tourist regions of Argentina: The North (orange), Litoral (light green), Cuyo (beige), Córdoba (dark green), Buenos Aires (consisting of Buenos Aires City and Buenos Aires Province; light blue) and Patagonia (dark blue)

Argentina has a vast territory and a variety of climates and microclimates ranging from tundra and polar in the south to the tropical climate in the north, through a vast expanse of temperate climate. Natural sights include the Aconcagua, the highest mountain in the world outside the Himalayas, the widest river and estuary of the planet (the Río de la Plata), the Iguazú Falls, the Humid Pampas, and the Argentine Sea.

The Argentine territory stretches from the highest peaks of the Andes in the west to colitis del Norte rivers and extensive beaches of the Atlantic Coast in the east; from the tropical rainforest of the Yungas north to the valleys, glaciers, lakes and cold forests of Andean Patagonia in the south, and to Argentine Antarctica. Through the warm landscapes of tropical climates contrasting, in a huge gradient microclimate, the polar climates or extensive and very fertile grasslands with the World's most flatter plains contrasting with the highest mountains outside Asia, contrasted with also vast desert areas plethoric of geoforms for the annual running extensive and extreme Dakar rally race, the high mountain ranges, the pleasant Pampeanas mountains and the extensive Atlantic Coast beaches. The huge distances require in most cases air travel. The Misiones rainforest, Argentine Yungas, and areas of the Andean Patagonia are scientifically considered as biodiversity hotspots large areas worldwide. The great biodiversity and a large number of different landscapes and climates make Argentina a diverse country.

Argentina received 5.80 million tourists in 2011 according to the World Tourism Organization, the first most visited country in South America and the second most visited of all of Latin America, after Mexico.

Yearly tourist arrivals in millions

== Main destinations ==
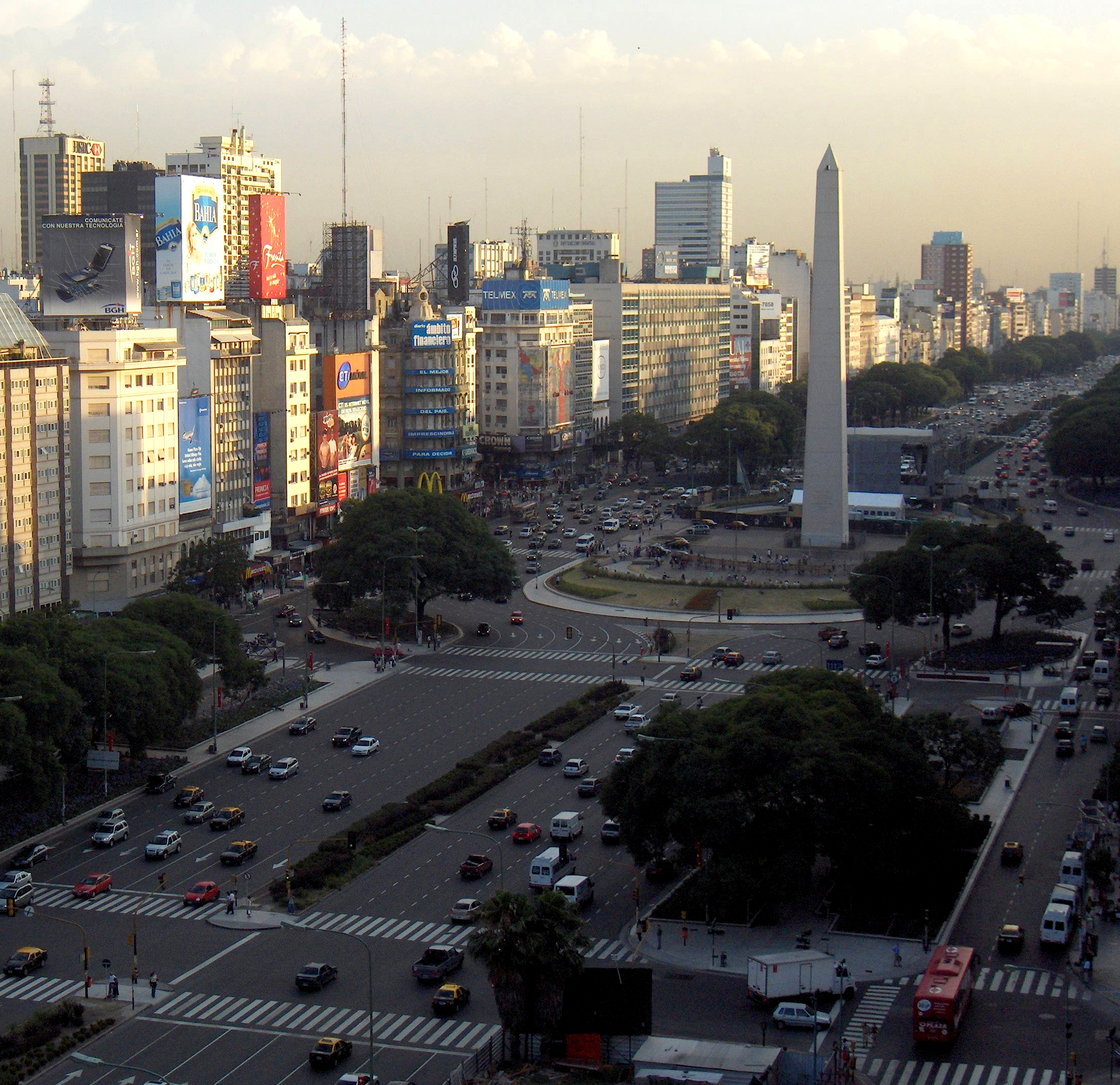
Buenos Aires, La Reina del Plata

- City of Buenos Aires is in the midst of a tourism boom, according to the World Travel & Tourism Council, it reveals strong growth for Argentina Travel and Tourism in 2007 and in coming years, and the prestigious travel and tourism publication; Travel + Leisure Magazine, a monthly publication leader in the worldwide market of travel magazines, travelers voted Buenos Aires the second most desirable city to visit after Florence, Italy. Buenos Aires, regarded as the “Paris of South America,” offers elegant architecture, exquisite cuisine, legendary nightlife, and fashionable shopping.

The most popular tourist sites are found in the historic city core, comprising Montserrat and San Telmo. The city was originally constructed around the Plaza de Mayo, the administrative center of the Spanish Empire. To the east of the square is the Casa Rosada, the official seat of the executive branch of the government of Argentina. To the north, the Catedral Metropolitana which has stood in the same location since colonial times, and the Banco de la Nación Argentina building, a parcel of land originally owned by Juan de Garay. Other important colonial institutions were Cabildo, to the west, which was renovated during the construction of Avenida de Mayo and Julio A. Roca. To the south is the Congreso de la Nación (National Congress), which currently houses the Academia Nacional de la Historia (National Academy of History). Lastly, to the northwest, is City Hall.

Avenida de Mayo links the Casa Rosada with the Argentine National Congress. On this avenue there are several buildings of cultural, architectural and historical importance, such as Casa de la Cultura, the Palacio Barolo and Café Tortoni. Underneath the avenue, the first subte (metro) line in South America, was opened in 1913. The avenue ends at Plaza del Congreso, which features a number of monuments and sculptures, including one of Auguste Rodin's few surviving original casts of "The Thinker".

The Manzana de las Luces ("Illuminated Block") area features the San Ignacio church, the Colegio Nacional Buenos Aires and the old city council building (1894 to 1931). This area features tunnels and catacombs, which crossed underneath the Plaza de Mayo during colonial times. In the neighborhood of San Telmo, Plaza Dorrego hosts an antique fair on Sundays, complete with tango shows. They also have tango shows daily at the famous plaza. On weekends they involve many tourists to learn how to dance. Frequent tours and activities are also available at the Church of Nuestra Señora de Bethlehem, the San Pedro Telmo Parish and the Antonio Ballvé Penitentiary Museum. The National Historical Museum in Parque Lezama is a few blocks south. The Ayres Porteños Hostel is a very famous hostel and a tourist attraction, it is decorated and painted by artists from La Boca and possesses a unique collection of local paintings among its walls.

The borough of Recoleta is home to a number of places of interest, including the Museo Nacional de Bellas Artes, the Biblioteca Nacional, the Centro Cultural Recoleta, the Faculty of Law of the Universidad de Buenos Aires, the Basílica Nuestra Señora de Pilar, the Palais de Glace, the Café La Biela and the Cementerio de la Recoleta, where Eva Perón's crypt can be visited, among those of many other Argentine historical and cultural figures.

- Iguazú Falls, located in the northeast, area of subtropical forest, on the border with Brazil are one of the world's natural wonders, has good infrastructure development and touristic with very different walks. Lined with dense forests, the Iguazú river flows into 275 waterfalls, plunging more than 70 meters with a deafening noise over 2.7 km. As this huge volume of water reaches the bottom, the spray rises, and rainbows are formed in the sky. A variety of the original fauna and flora completes the setting for the waterfalls within the protection of the Iguazú National Park. This park, located eighteen kilometers from Puerto Iguazú, was declared Natural Heritage of Humanity by UNESCO. The famous falls are inside this park. The frontier with Brazil goes through the Garganta del Diablo (Devil's Throat). The National Park is full of the exotic subtropical vegetation which surrounds the falls and has 2,000 plant species - gigantic trees, ferns, lianas, orchids, - 400 bird species - parrots, hummingbirds, toucans - jaguars and yacarés (caimans) from the area. Its most impressive fall is called Garganta del Diablo. Other important is called Dos Hermanas, Bossetti or Álvar Núñez in honor of its discoverer, Álvar Núñez Cabeza de Vaca.

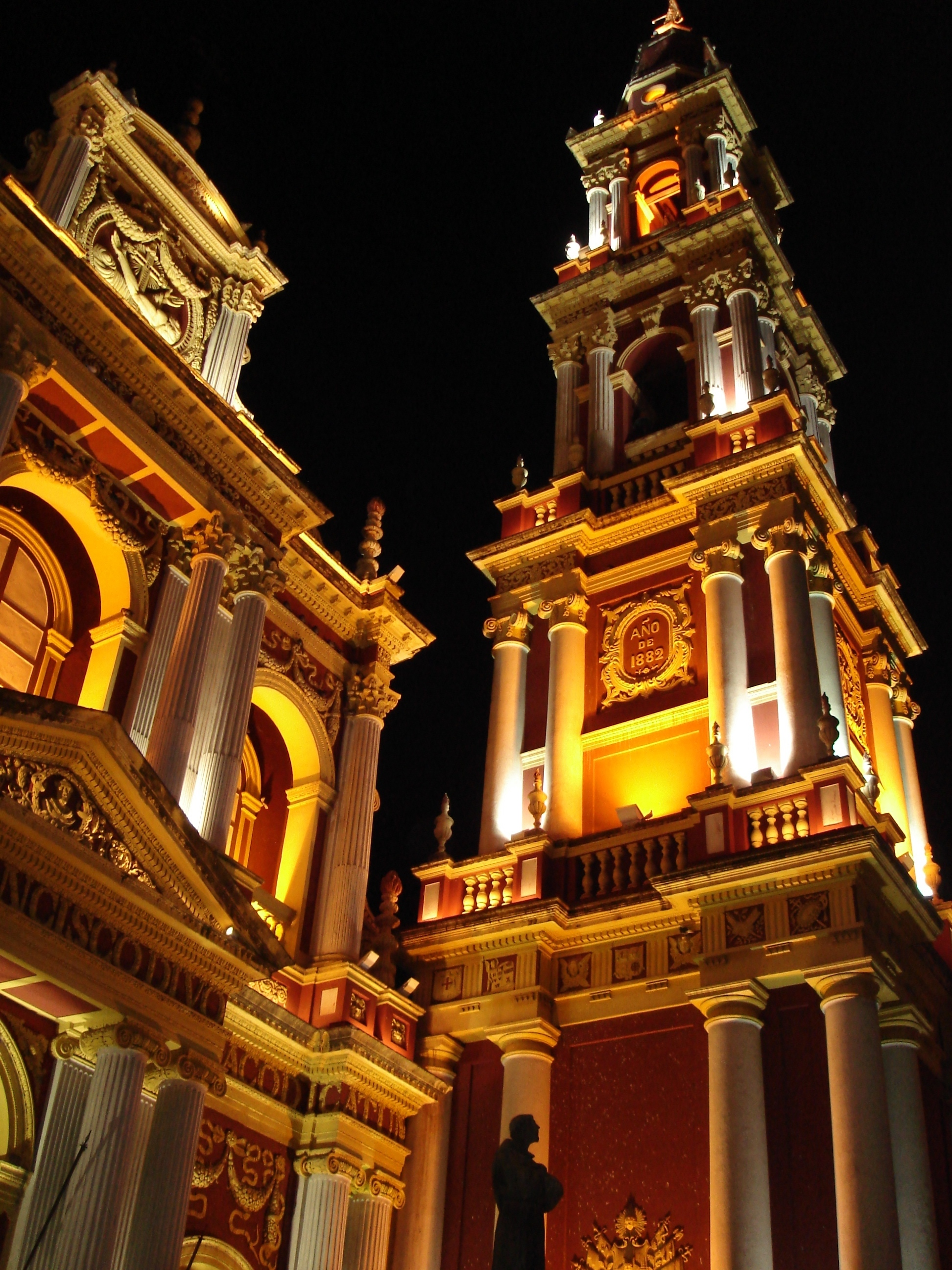
Church of San Francisco in Salta, with the highest church bell of South America

- Salta is a city of colonial architecture with tourist attractions such as: Quebrada de San Lorenzo, Calchaquí Valleys, Reservoir Cabra Corral (Embalse General Belgrano), Cafayate, Salinas Grandes, Iruya (step bound by the Quebrada de Humahuaca and Purmamarca) Cachi (through the Cuesta del Obispo) Molinos, La Caldera, Los Cardones National Park, El Rey National Park or Baritú National Pand the hrk, hot springs of Rosario de la Frontera. The Tren a las Nubes is a train ride through the area of the Puna. Puna, a land full of mountain ranges, steep mountain paths, valleys, and gorges. Villages have been built in the small valleys with multi-colored and monochromatic hills covered with huge cacti on the slopes surrounding the village. This region offers landscapes full of contrast, from the high peaks to the salt pans, and the subtropical rain forests, where Latin American culture took root, located in the Northern provinces (Jujuy, Salta, Catamarca, Tucumán and Santiago del Estero). In Northern provinces feature traces of pre-Columbian cultures, mingled with ruins of natives’ villages, as well as forts and constructions dating back to the time of the Conquest and Colonization. The service of this train was interrupted momentarily in July 2005 for repairs, reactivated quickly. Currently, the final destination is the city of San Antonio de Los Cobres. The whole Northern provinces combine natural attractions with suitable areas for diverse activities such as mountaineering, trekking, horseback riding, mountain biking, ecotourism, bird-watching, rural tourism, archaeological trips, sailing, canoeing and windsurfing.

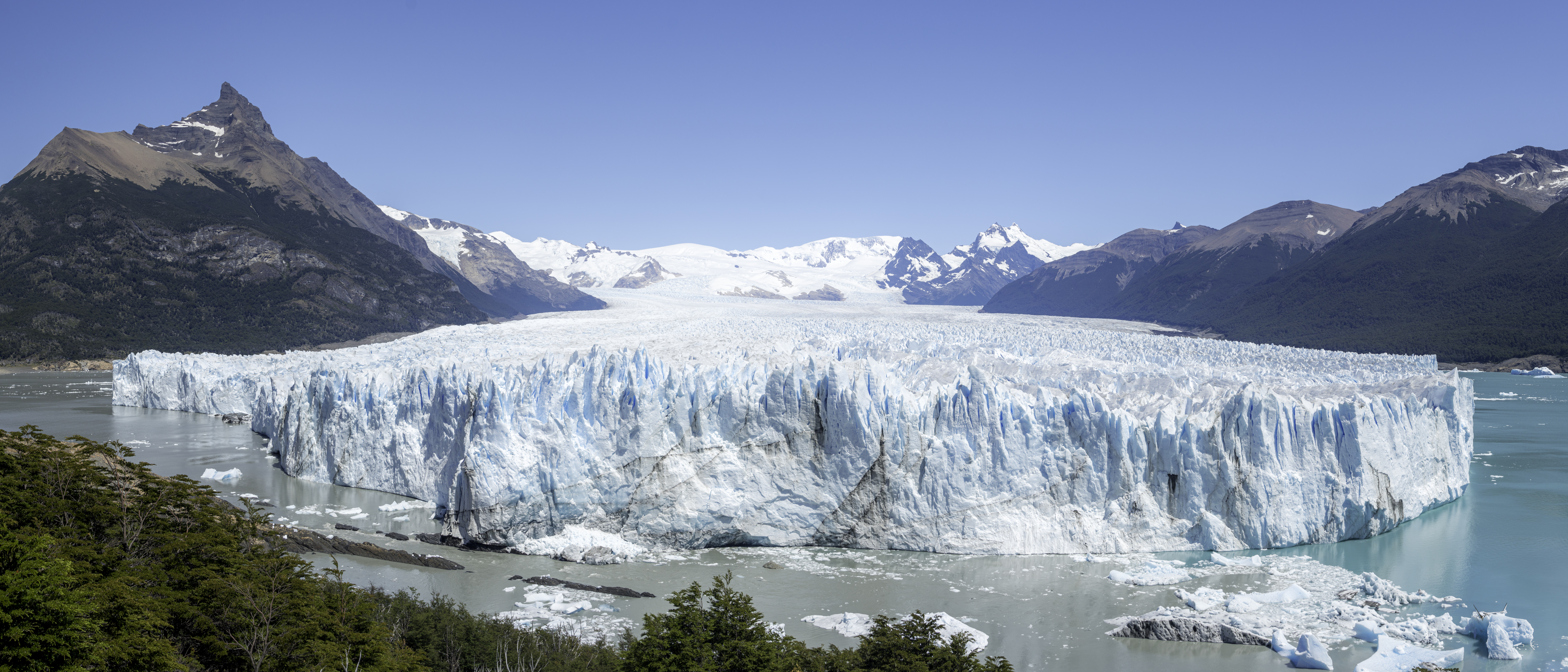
The Perito Moreno Glacier in summer, located in the World Heritage Los Glaciares National Park

- Perito Moreno Glacier, a part of Southern Patagonian Ice Field is a huge glacier that bisects the Argentino Lake and cyclically locks until it produces the breaking of the ice plug. It is located in the Los Glaciares National Park near the Argentine Patagonian city of El Calafate. In any season of the year continuous landslides of huge blocks of ice are produced from massive glaciers forming beautiful icebergs in Argentine lakes. The Perito Moreno Glacier and its neighbors is framed by a landscape of rugged mountains like the Chaltén and large lakes.
- Bariloche: This city is the capital of the southern lakes and important part of the tourist circuit of the Seven Lakes with Villa La Angostura and mountains (Tronador, Cerro Catedral, Cerro López). It is famous for skiing but also great for family trips for older children and sight-seeing, water sports, winter sports, fishing, windsurfing, trekking or hiking, climbing, camping in the Andean forest, sky diving, boat tours and private boats, horseback riding and scuba diving and more. Cerro Catedral is one of the most important ski centers in South America. Today, thanks to the investments of entrepreneurs and of municipality has a large tourist flow throughout the year. Also it make similar activities in San Martín de los Andes, Junín de los Andes, El Bolsón, Esquel, Trevelin, Los Antiguos activities are also developed Copahue, Caviahue.

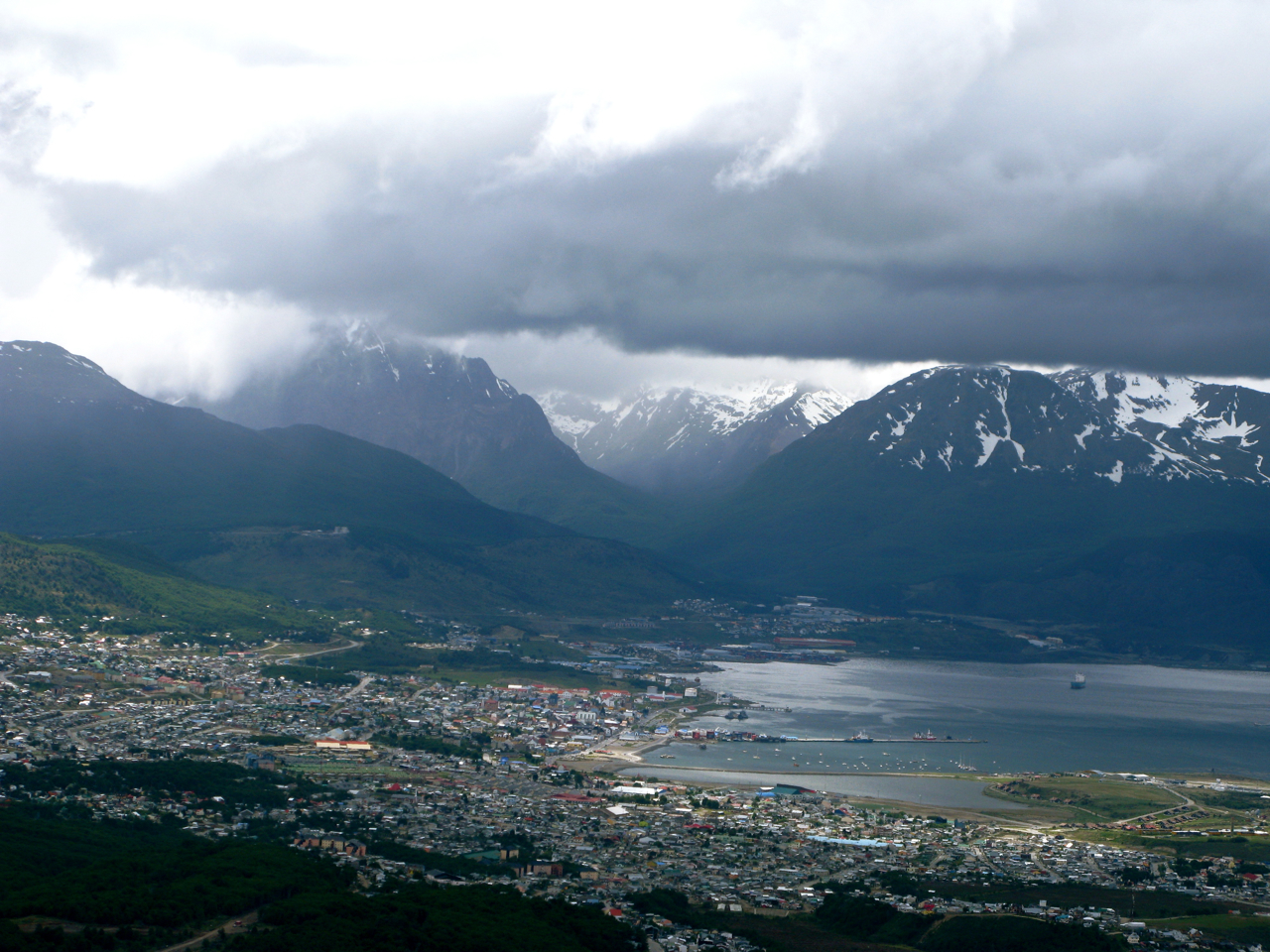
The city of Ushuaia in summer, in the Province of Tierra del Fuego, Antarctica and South Atlantic Islands

- Ushuaia, The southernmost city in the world, in Tierra del Fuego, typical destination of the south of the country, attracts visitors with a very important tourist with excursions and gastronomy. North of the island, the city of Rio Grande is attracted by the old neighborhood of wooden houses painted varied or subtly and by excellent trout fishing. Further south, it is famous railway from Ushuaia and reaches the Tierra del Fuego National Park, bayside of Lapataia. Cruises are also offered by the Beagle Channel, observing colonies of South American sea lions, and a visit to Lighthouse Les Eclareurs, the beautiful Lake Fagnano (or Kami) or almost inaccessible Staten Island where is the Lighthouse of the End of the World, the landscape of Fueguan forests takes an almost magical appearance during the austral autumn to be covered with reddish the foliage of the dense forests.

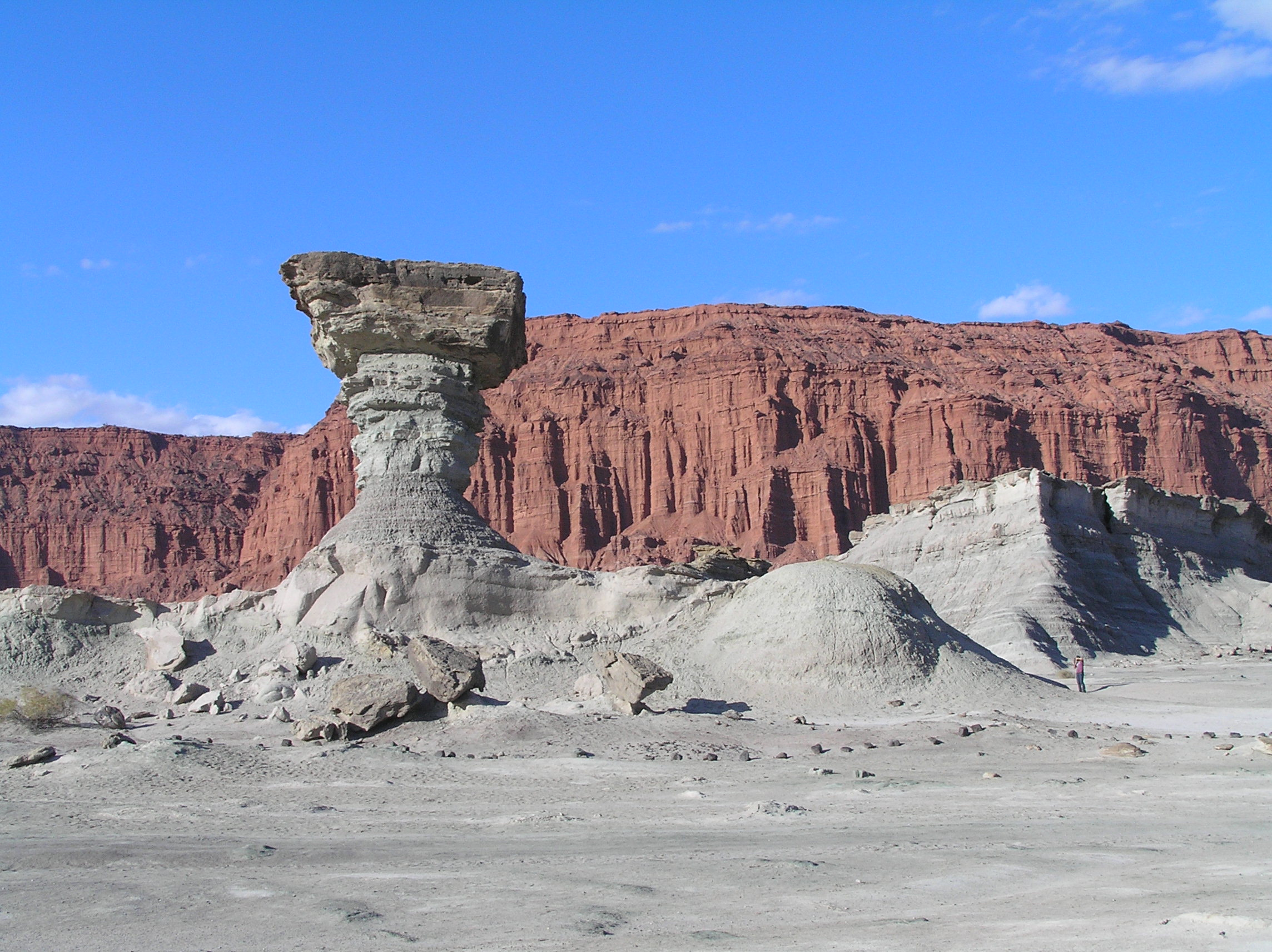
Moon Valley

- Sierras de Córdoba, A mountain range of mild climate and landscapes ranging from the bucolic and wild, there are the main tourist centers: Villa General Belgrano and La Cumbrecita, touristic towns with large central European influence in the Sierras de Córdoba. Other major cities are Villa Carlos Paz, Cosquín, La Falda, Capilla del Monte, Mina Clavero, Jesús María or the Great Salt Lake of Mar Chiquita. The Unidad Turística Embalse is the destination of social tourism. the Córdoba Province It has little towns, historical antiques and cave paintings are found in a pleasant valley landscape, high plains and gorges. The City of Córdoba also has a great tourist attraction, especially in its valuable building of colonial period or in its urban landscapes. It also has a very good tourist infrastructure with major 5 star hotels, shopping centers of excellence, as well as highlights in the field of gastronomy and fun. The city of Córdoba is one of the most picturesque of Argentina because it has a historical center with beautiful Baroque Colonial architecture mixed with tall modern buildings that give the city a great tourist attraction. With many contrasting features— it is both a cultural and tourist-like destination, a traditional and modern city, with an industrialized as well as a home-made production. Large portions of landscape and favorable weather conditions are distinctive in Córdoba, natural sceneries are mixed with colonial monuments. They are part of the “Sierras pampeanas” mountain range, reaching 2,790 m high in the Champaqui hill. These hills are fertile valleys, deserts and salt mines. All along the way northward, many 17th and 18th century chapels and farmhouses inherited from the Jesuits can be found.

The Jesuit estancias (large cattle ranches) in Córdoba are a singular sample of the productive organization of the religious members of Compañía de Jesús in the country, and this can still be seen in a preserved architecture. Though history demonstrated that the farms were acquired for economic purposes in order to support schools and universities, the estancias were of course used “for missionary purposes, thus turning into religious centers.” Estancias in Jesús María, Caroya, Santa Catalina, La Candelaria and Alta Gracia can be visited along a 250 km circuit. These farms that date back to the 17th century —together with the Jesuit Block in the City of Córdoba— are all national historical monuments that were declared World Cultural Heritage in 2000.

- Ischigualasto, also known as The Moon Valley, offers a strange landscape where the scarcity of vegetation and the more varied range vegetation of its soils plus the unusual forms of its rocks (geoforms) and mountains, make this a favorite place for tourists, both domestic and foreign. This provincial park, declared World Heritage Site by UNESCO, is located at the northern end of the province of San Juan. It is also a major paleontological center became famous because it is the only place where it can be seen completely exposed and perfectly differentiated the whole Triassic period as complete and orderly, where the oldest fossils in the world were found. The Moon Valley, so named because of the diverse forms and colours of its landscape shaped by erosion, continues in the Argentinian province of La Rioja with the Talampaya National Park. The Talampaya River Canyon reveals multi-shaped layers in its high red walls. Pink flamingos, Andean ducks, “vicuñas” and “guanacos” cohabit freely in parks and natural reserves, while condors fly over the area.

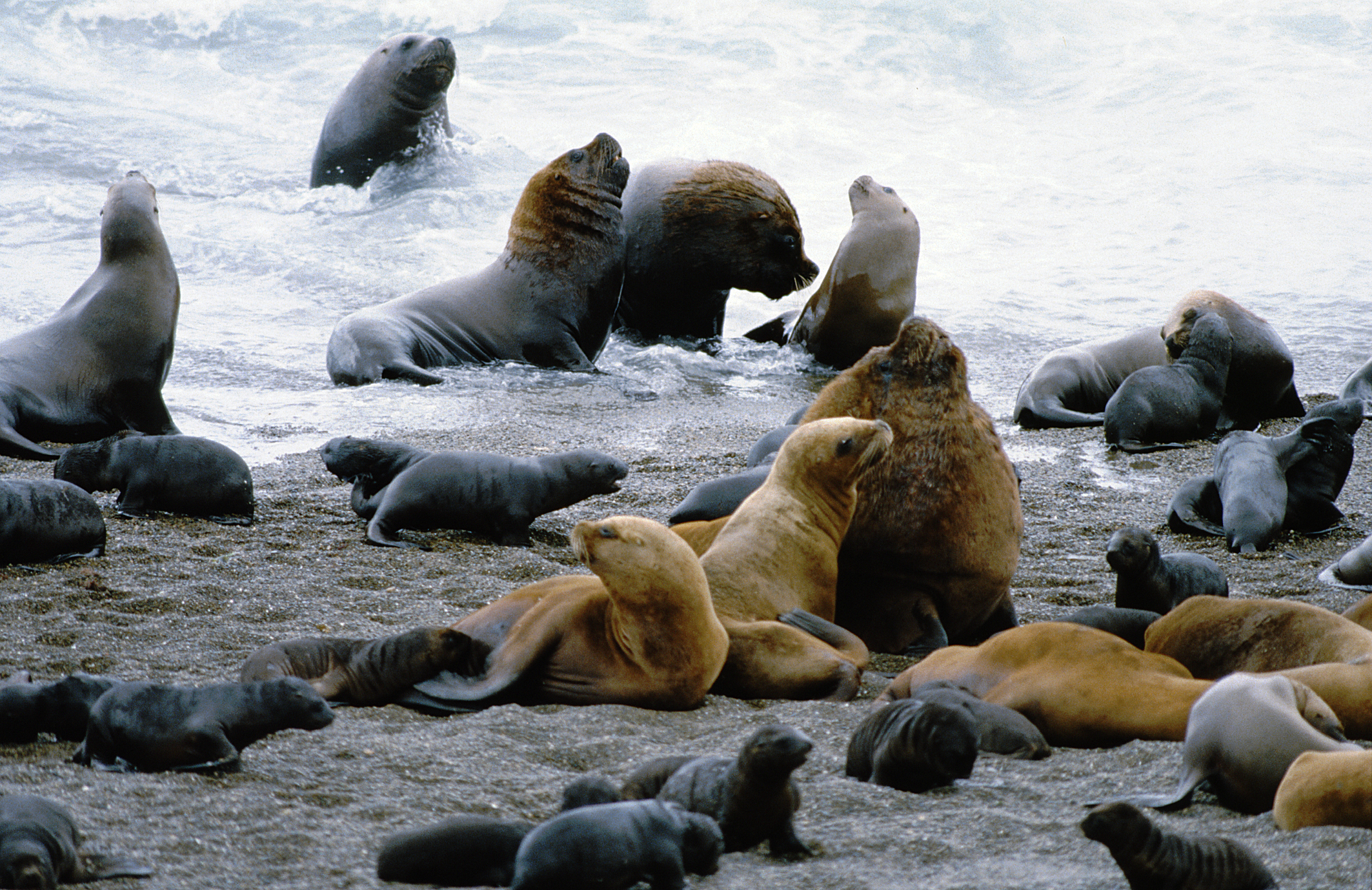
Sea lions on the shores of Patagonia

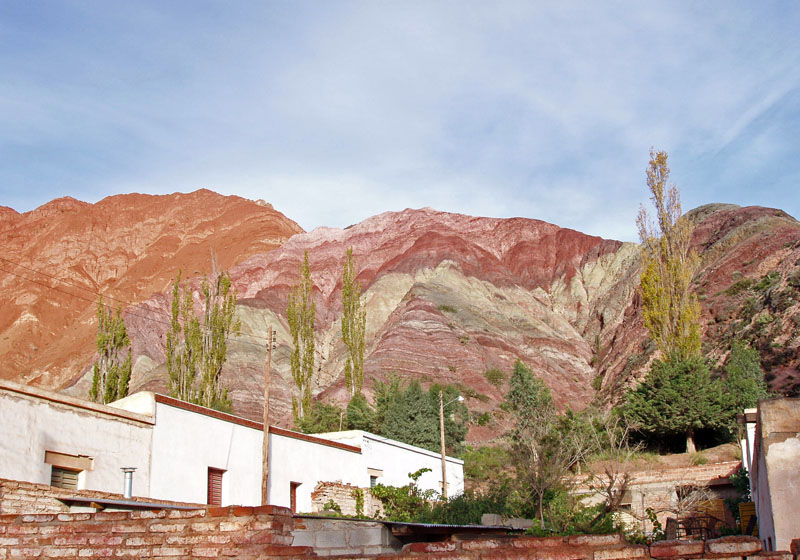
The Quebrada de Humahuaca view from Purmamarca in the province of Jujuy

The Quebrada de Humahuaca, the Calchaquí Valleys, the Puna de Atacama (including cono de Arita, the Laguna de Pozuelos, the Campo de Piedra Pómez etc.), Ischigualasto, Talampaya, the Aconcagua, Caviahue and Copahue, near snow-capped mountains with temperate rainforests and glacial lakes; Andean Patagonic national parks, etc. constitute the tourist corridor called the Andean Footprint (Huella Andina) which is largely covered by National Route 40.

=== Other destinations ===
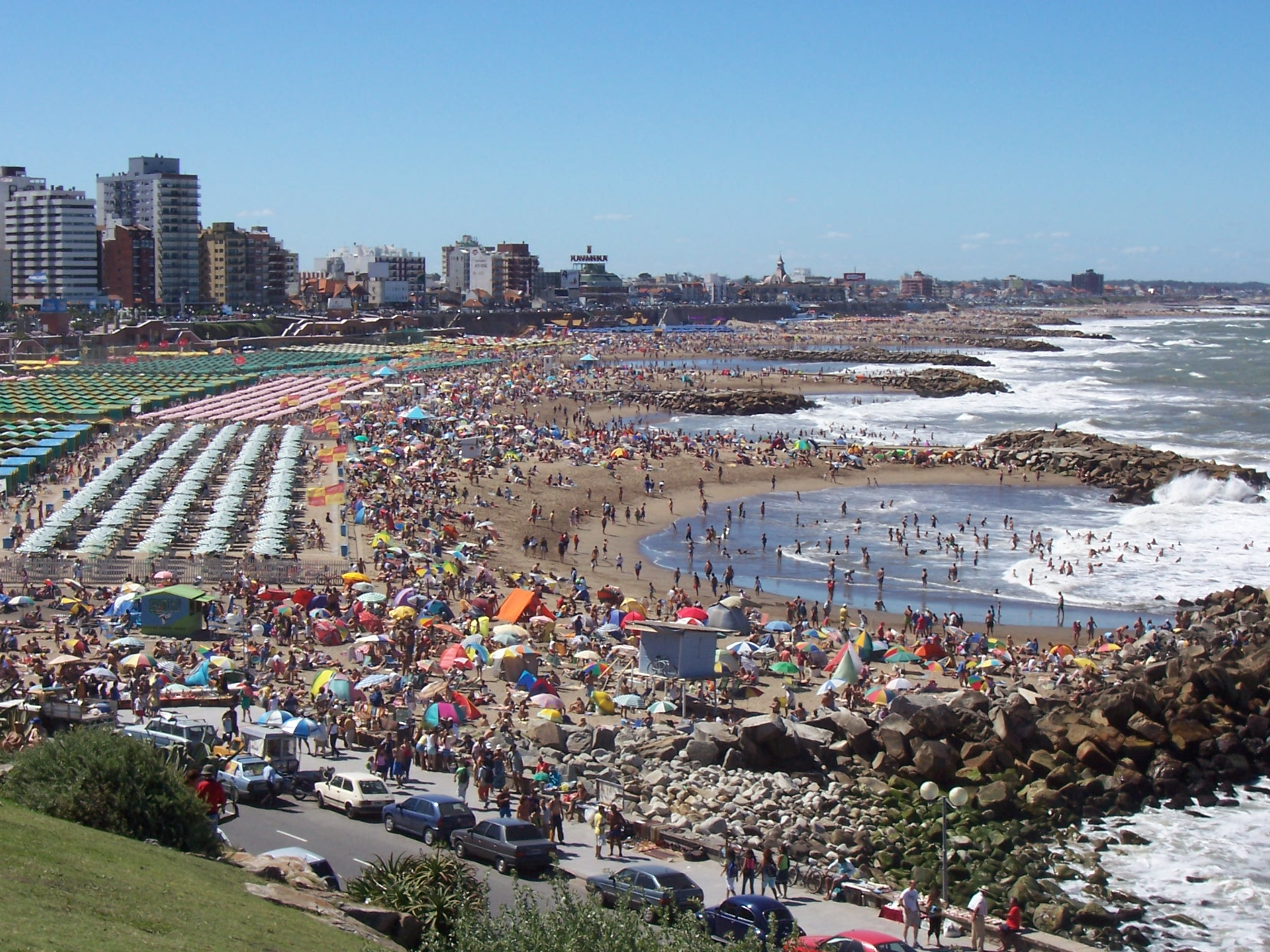
Two of the beaches of Mar del Plata during summer tourism season

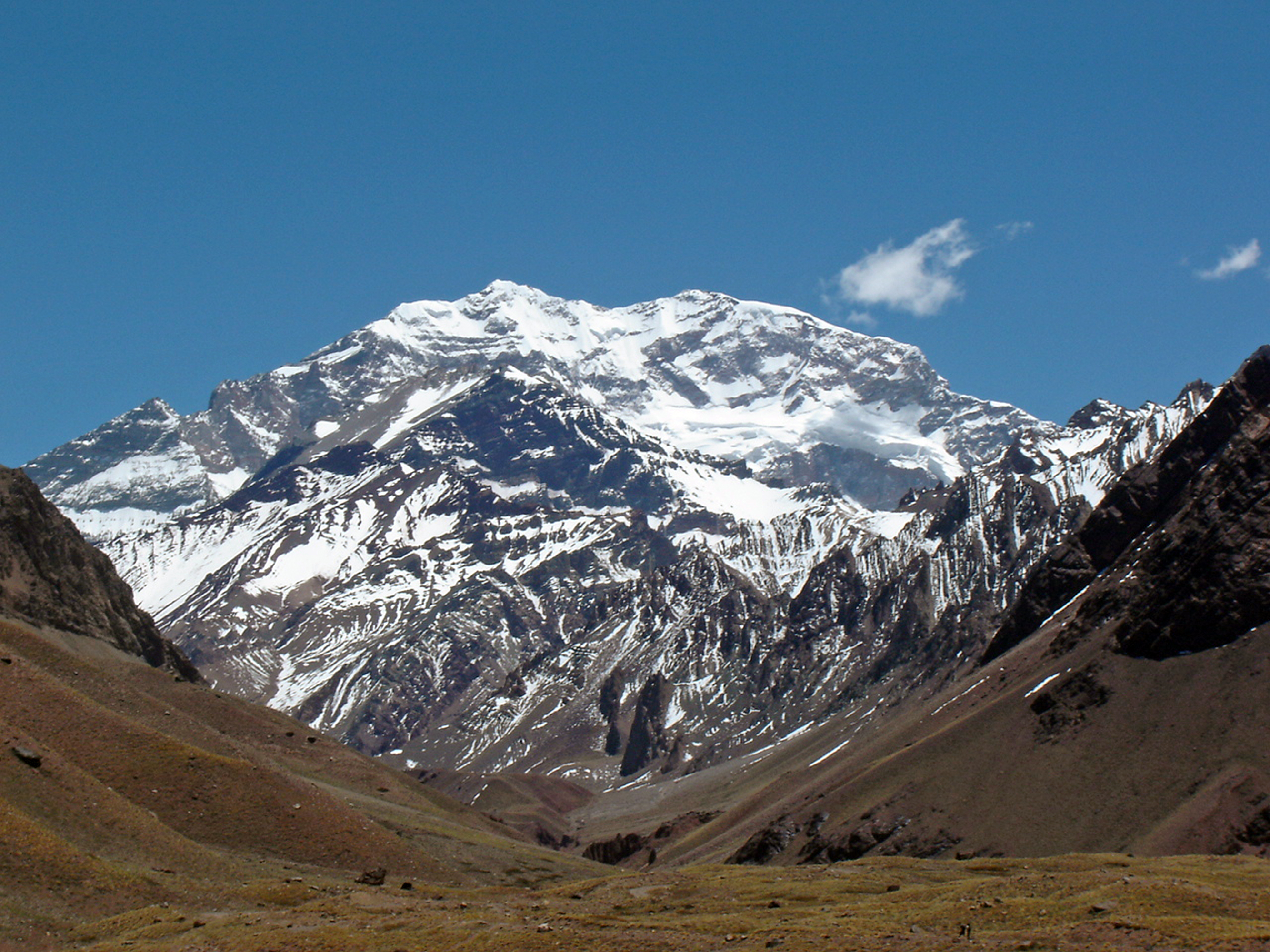
Aconcagua with snow. Located in the province of Mendoza, it is the highest mountain in the world outside the Himalayas, and continues to rise.

Mar del Plata is a tourist city with large beaches on the Atlantic Coast. Other beaches on the Argentine Atlantic Coast include as Necochea, Cariló, Villa Gesell, Monte Hermoso, Pehuen-Có, Las Grutas (in Río Negro), Rada Tilly in Chubut. Other destinations include the Aconcagua (6,959 m), the highest peak in America. Its steep slopes are renowned and respected by mountain climbers worldwide. Las Leñas; Talampaya, of great geological interest; San Rafael heart of Mendoza, where the best wines in Argentina are made, with its imposing Atuel Canyon, the valleys of Barreal of Iglesia, in San Juan highlighting the adventure tourism. Whales-watching in Puerto Madryn on the coast of Argentine Patagonia. Other very attractive destinations are the valley of Tafí in Tucumán, ancient populations of Yavi and Iruya, the ruins of ancient pre-Columbian cities like Tastil, Tilcara, Shincal de Quimivil, the Pucará of Aconquija, a fort built by the humahuacas. In La Rioja, the path of Riojan warlords, with Olta and Malanzán as main cities. In the first are monuments to Chacho Penaloza and the tango Caminito, inspired there, while in Malanzán is the birthplace of Facundo Quiroga. It can also visit the oldest city in Argentina, the mother of cities Santiago del Estero, between the city Santiago del Estero halfway to San Miguel de Tucumán is located one of the most famous tourist destinations of mild winter in Argentina: the Hot springs of Río Hondo.

Are very attractive traditional events like the fair of Simoca in Tucumán, the Fiesta of the Lord and the Virgin of the Miracle in Salta or the pilgrimages to Luján and Punta Corral in Jujuy, the parade of faith to the Difunta Correa. An ample diversity of natural landscapes and dramatic contrasts such as the densely vegetated Yunga forests, or the mountains, hills and brooks of the Calchaquí Valleys, provide great conditions for fishing for sport fishing. Sport fishing of sea and river (of trout and sea bass in the Fueguan city of Río Grande, or dorado in Paso de la Patria, Juramento, Lipeo, Iruya and Bermejo). For it part -it has been said- Ushuaia is a privileged access to the Argentine Antarctica, the picturesque Route of the Adobe and the Tatón Dunes in the Province of Catamarca; rugged adventure tourism in the provinces of Santiago del Estero and La Pampa or in the Yungas and Calchaquí Valleys, the high Andean desert and jungles of Chaco, the northern Entre Ríos (Montiel Forest) and Misiones.

The Province of Buenos Aires is the most populous and largest province of Argentina (if territorial claims in the Antarctica and South Atlantic islands are not taken into account). The nation's rail and road network fans out from Buenos Aires and into the province, the area centered on the Pampas. This region is characterized by its estancias (large cattle ranches) the oldest of them being featured in architectural styles, located in the middle of the Pampas. The province is also known by its many and different beaches in the coast of the Atlantic Ocean (the most visited being Mar del Plata). The hilly region of Tandil and Ventana offers golf courses, paragliding rides and trekking. They are very different landscapes from each other and distant from the mouth of the Paraná River, which islands are also visited by tourists.

Many ruins of the ancient Jesuit missions - some of which have been covered by the jungle - are located near Posadas. The most well-known ruins are in San Ignacio Miní, 56 km away from the province's capital. The ones in Candelaria, Loreto, Santa Ana and Santa María are also very interesting. These Jesuit reductions were declared World Heritage by the UNESCO.

Fifty kilometers to the north of Colón lies El Palmar National Park, housing the last samples of Yatay palm trees, which are almost eight centuries old. The city of Concordia is connected to the city of Salto (Uruguay) through the Salto Grande hydroelectric plant.

The Esteros del Iberá, a humid zone of 700.000 hectares can be reached from Posadas, Concepción or Mercedes. In Guaraní, Iberá means "Shining water". Its lagoons cover 31,500 hectares, its marshlands 52,000, and its inlands 260,000. This eco-system which gives life to turtles, yacarés (caimans), monkeys, swamp deer, capybaras - the largest rodent in the world - and up to 400 bird species, besides an extraordinary flora, extends over one million hectares.

The city of Rosario lies on the banks of the Paraná River in the Province of Santa Fe. It has developed into an industrial and commercial center and destination for a significant number of people on business. On its riverside promenade stands the Monumento Nacional a la Bandera (National Monument to the Flag), where the Argentine National Flag was raised for the first time. Parque Independencia has statues, a racecourse, and the Provincial History Museum.

Punta Tombo is a coastal location where abundant wildlife congregates-specifically the seasonal breeding ground of large numbers of Magellanic penguins.

Peninsula Valdés is widely considered to be one of the best places in the world for the observation of wildlife, mainly sea mammals. Although southern right whales are the main attraction elephant seals, sea lions, Magellanic penguins and orcas are also well represented.

Laguna del Carbon (the lowest geographical point in the Americas), Mount Fitz Roy, and the Petrified Forests National Monument, as well as the vast patagonian plateau.

== Main circuits ==
Overall Argentina has the following tourist circuits (north to south):

- The Argentine Northwest, with contrasting landscapes like walking the Tren a las Nubes (train to the clouds) the arid and the cold of high embellished by curious landforms, saline, alkaline lakes where abound flamingos, geysers and high volcanoes, the transition zone of Valleys and Quebradas with mild climates as for cultivation of vine in Cafayate and good vegetation and, further east the dense rainforest called the Yungas. The spectacular cuestas as Obispo (in Salta) or the Portezuelo, Piedras Blancas and Capillitas in Catamarca or the Miranda in the Argentine province of La Rioja.
- The Argentine Northeast that is characterized by its warm subtropical climate, its dense forests, parks, wetlands (marshes), large rivers with abundant fishing and big waterfalls.
- The sphere of the Sierras de Córdoba
- The circuit of Cuyo with the highest mountains of America, rugged landscapes (canyons like the Atuel, or the Jáchal, several spectacular landforms: bridges like the Puente del Inca and castles like Castillos de Pincheira of natural rocks), ice formations like Los Penitentes, caves and caverns, large volcanic extensions as in the Payún, ski resorts or pleasant valleys where stand crops temperate fruits, olive trees and vines.
- The Pampas: a vast plain of temperate climate crossed by million cattle, dotted with numerous lakes and possessing a long coastline with long sandy beaches and dunes where thriving cities and seaside villages, known as the Atlantic Coast (Costa Atlántica).
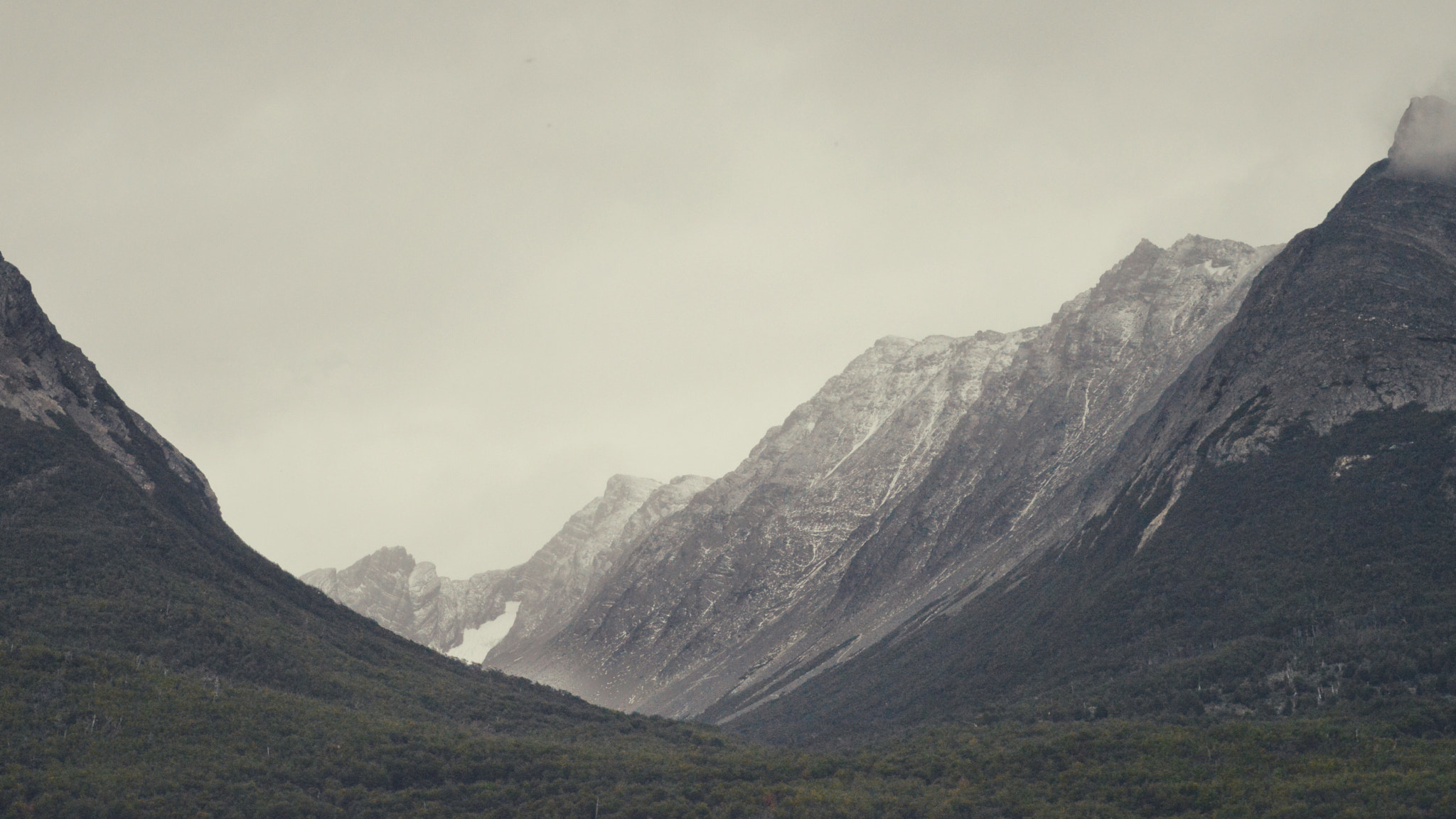
- Patagonia, 2015
  The Western Patagonia and more precisely Andean Patagonia, with beautiful landscapes who meet mountains always snowy, ice fields, glaciers, cold forests, large and deep lakes of glacial origin and very running rivers, winter sports centers and beautiful "alpine" aspect towns.
- The Eastern Patagonia or outAndean: large region of plateaus, mountains, canyons, moors and steppes whose coastline has high cliffs, gulfs, peninsulas where seabirds abound (especially penguins) pinnipeds, and whales.

== Carnivals ==
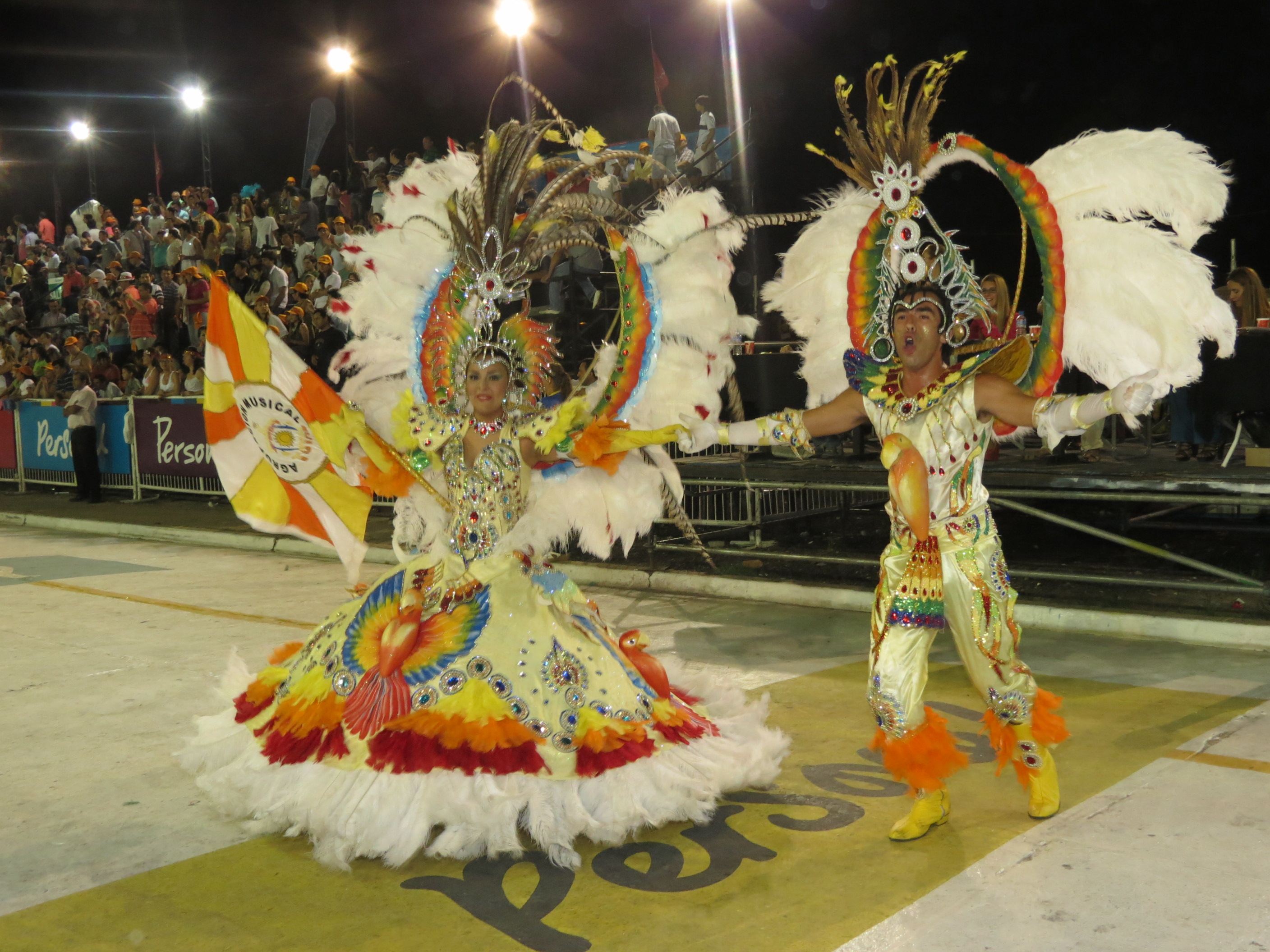
Corrientes Carnival, 2012

Carnivals in Argentina are very important and usually take place during the last days of February (before the lent), at a time that remains still quite summer (summer in the Southern Hemisphere). Almost every carnival in Argentina comes from European carnivals in Spain and Italy, so it is spoken in them of murgas and corsos, with its masquerades and cabezudos although there have also influences of African elements from colonial times (the rate of drum in the murgas is almost obviously of African origin), and in the Quebrada de Humahuaca (in the northern province of Jujuy) and in the small town of Chamical (in Argentine La Rioja) are held a "carnavalito" and a "chaya" more influenced by Andean American Indians. During the second half of the 20th century the cities of the province of Corrientes (mainly Paso de los Libres) and the Province of Entre Ríos have had a strong influence from the Rio carnival in Brazil the same way as the Carnival de Río in San Luis generally celebrated on the banks of Potrero de los Funes Lake in Province of San Luis.

== World Heritage ==
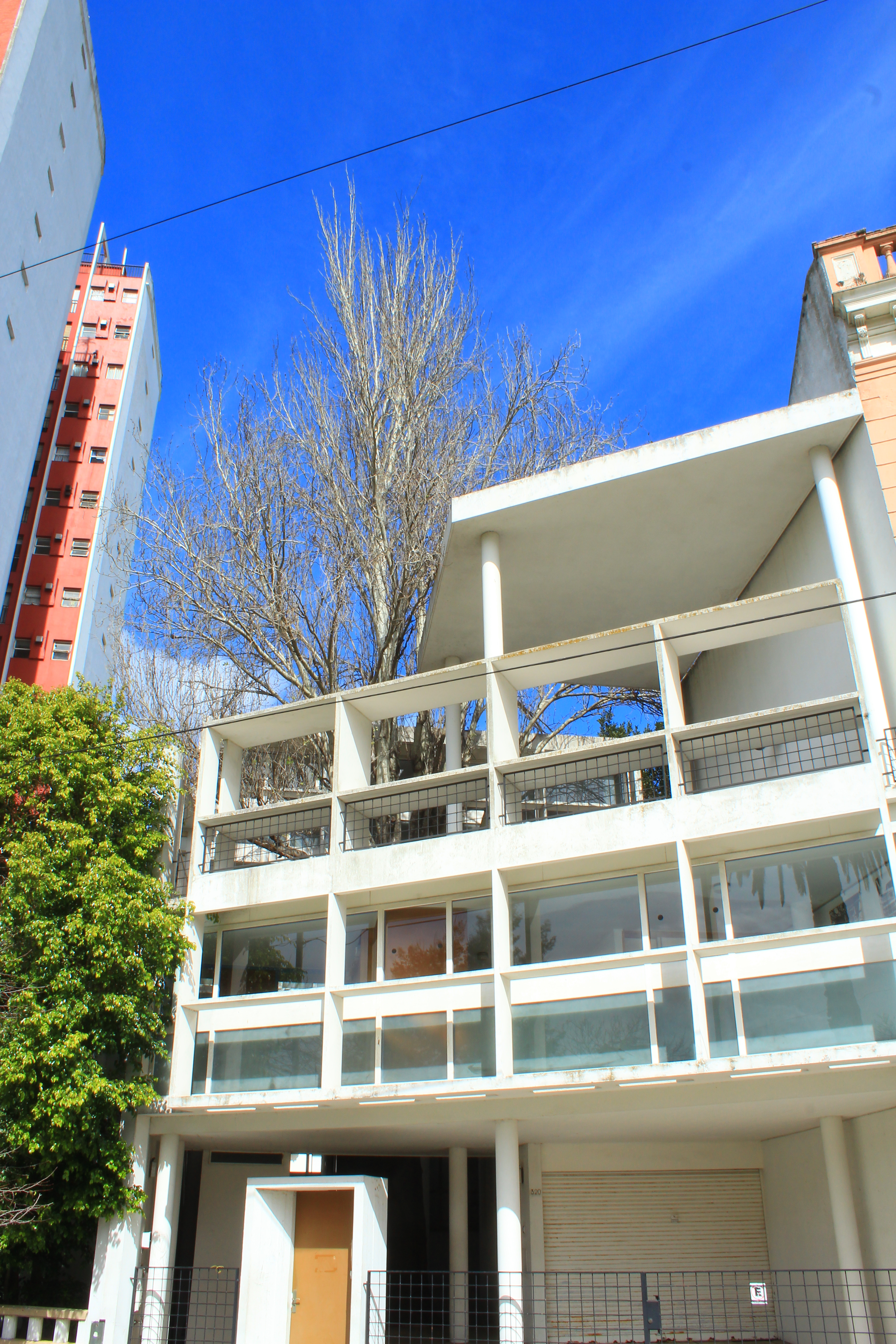
Curutchet House, World Heritage Site in La Plata

These are the UNESCO's World Heritage Sites in Argentina:

- Los Glaciares National Park (1981)
- Jesuit reductions: San Ignacio Mini, Nuestra Señora de Santa Ana, Nuestra Señora de Loreto and Santa María la Mayor (1984)
- Iguazú National Park (1984)
- Cave of the Hands (1999)
- Península Valdés (1999)
- Ischigualasto / Talampaya National Parks (2000)
- Jesuit Block and Estancias of Córdoba (2000)
- Quebrada de Humahuaca (2003)
- Los Alerces National Park (2017)

== Ethical traveler destination ==
Argentina has been included in 2010, 2011 and 2012 in the list of "The Developing World's 10 Best Ethical Destinations". This is an annual ranking produced by Ethical Traveler magazine, which is based on studies of developing nations which attempt to identify the best tourism destinations using categories such as environmental protection, social welfare, and human rights.

== Hotels ==
Accommodation in Argentina includes large city hotels (particularly in Buenos Aires), seaside resorts (notably around Mar del Plata), and mountain or lakeside properties in the Andes and Patagonia.

== Safety and security ==
The U.S. Department of State warns travelers in Argentina that "drivers frequently ignore traffic laws and vehicles often travel at excessive speeds... traffic accidents are the primary threat to life and limb in Argentina." Argentina has the highest traffic mortality rate in South America, with Argentine drivers causing 20 deaths each day (about 7,000 a year), with more than 120,000 people injured or maimed each year. These deaths have included tourists from various parts of the world.

== See also ==
- Visa policy of Argentina
- Culture of Argentina
- Cuisine of Argentina
- Destino Argentina
