= Cuyo (Argentina) =

Mountainous region of central-west Argentina

Coordinates: 32.9073°S 68.0603°W

Cuyo region Región de Cuyo (Spanish)
- Region
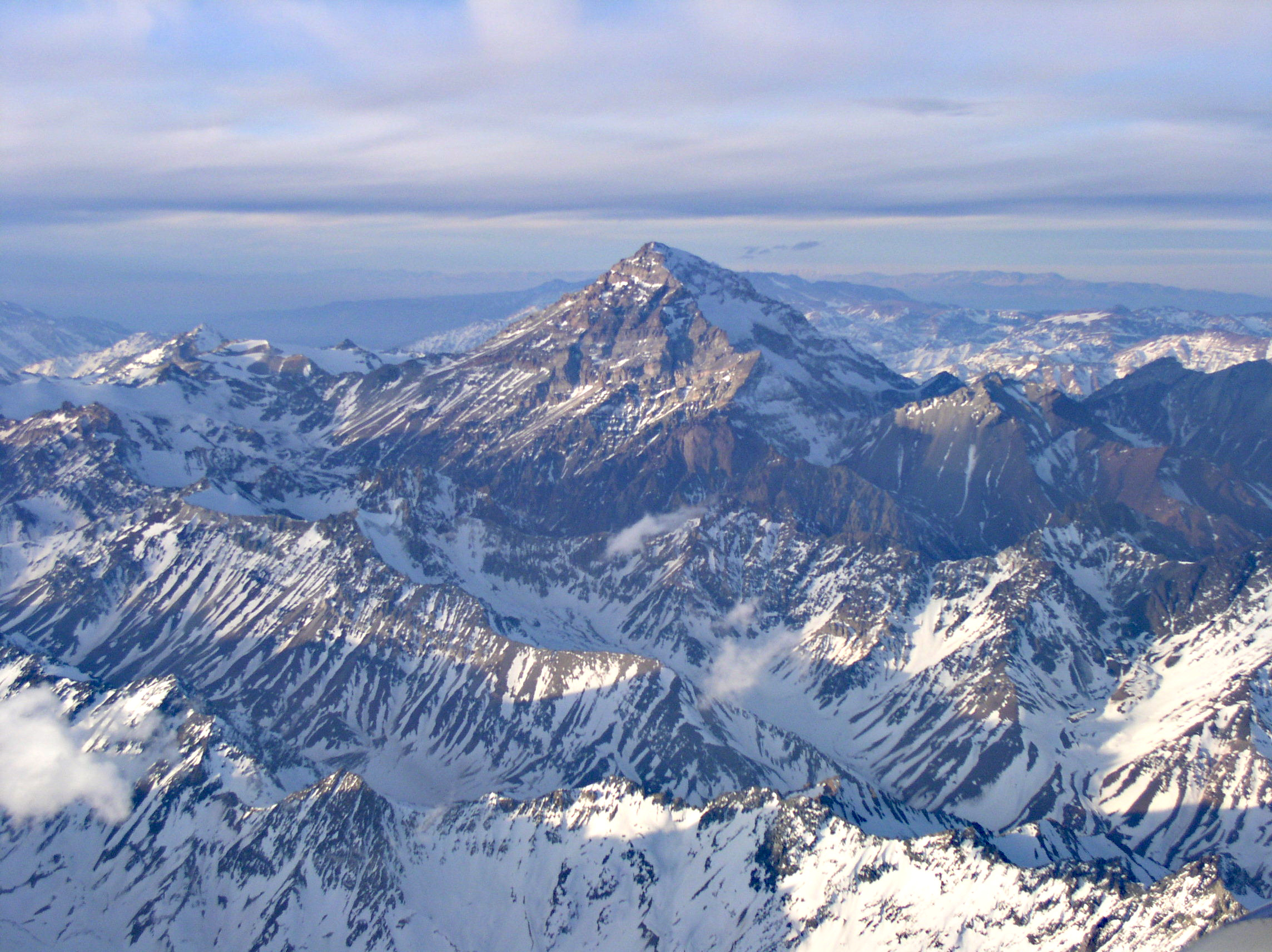
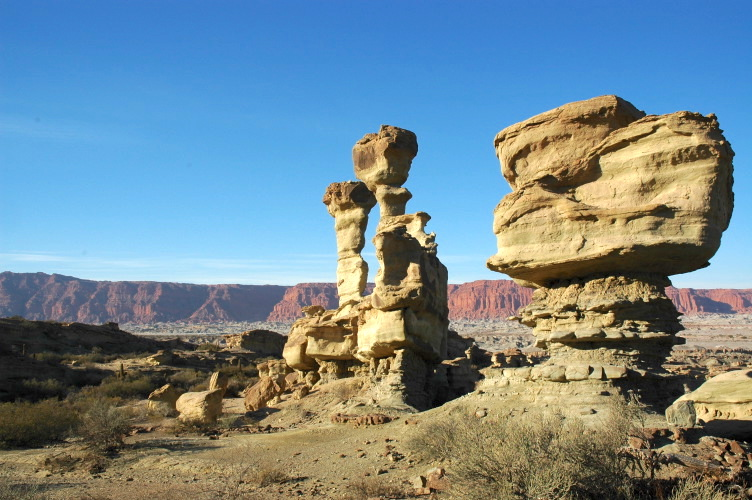
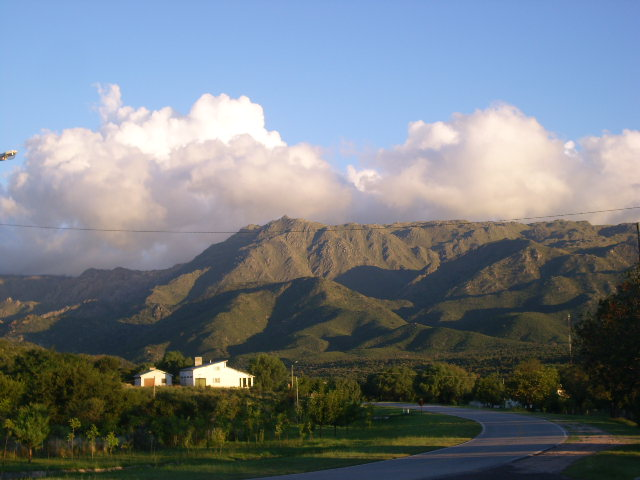
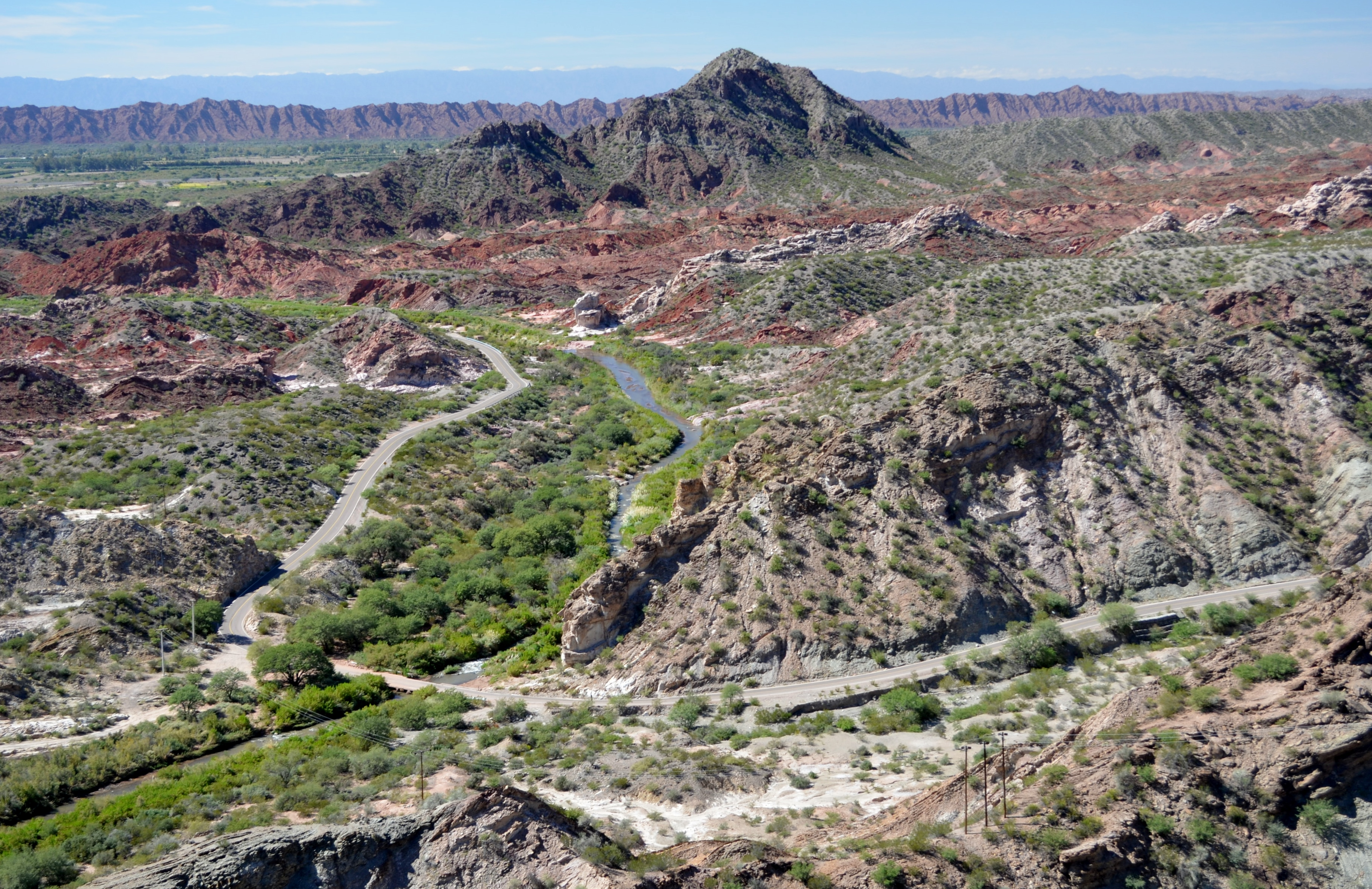
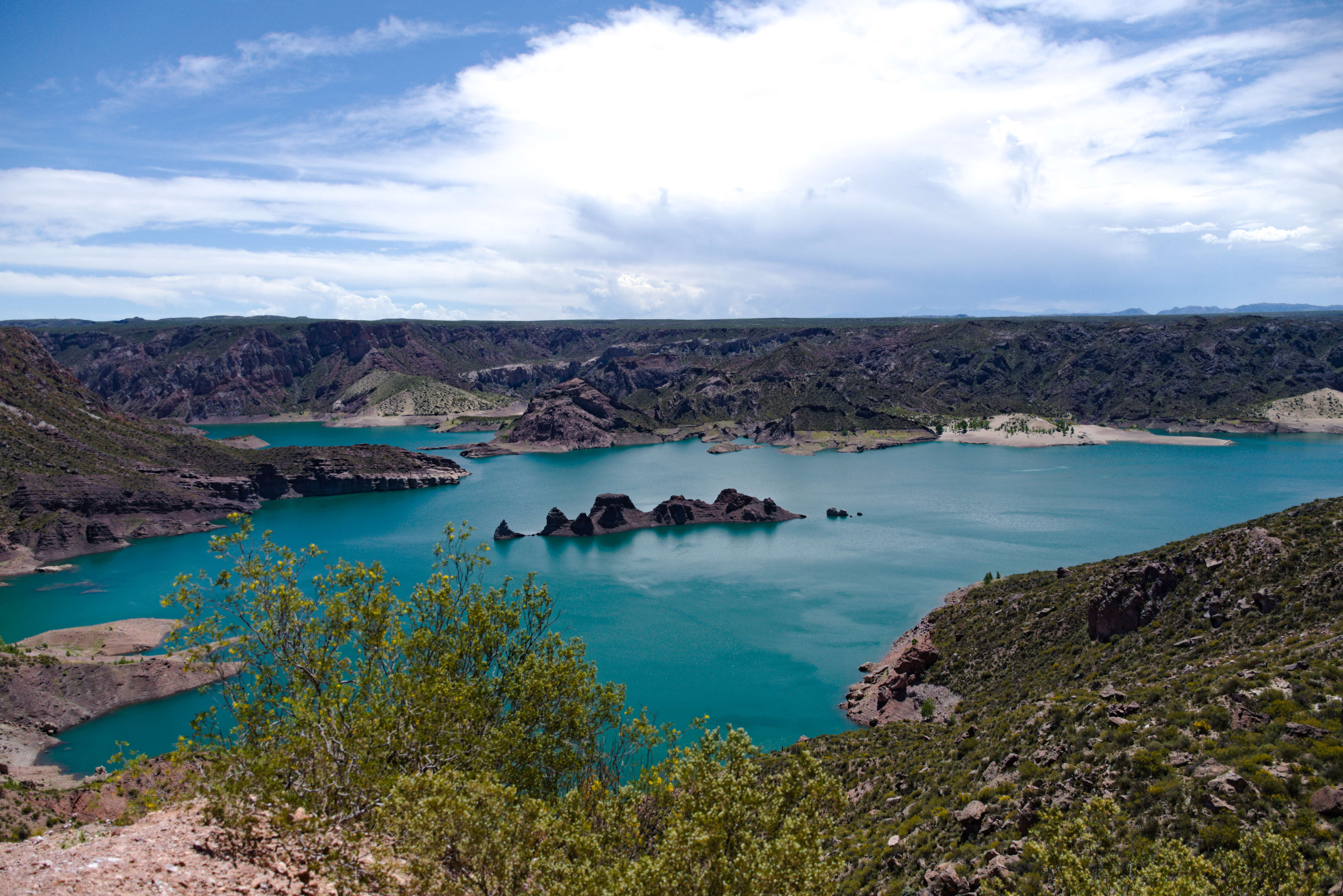
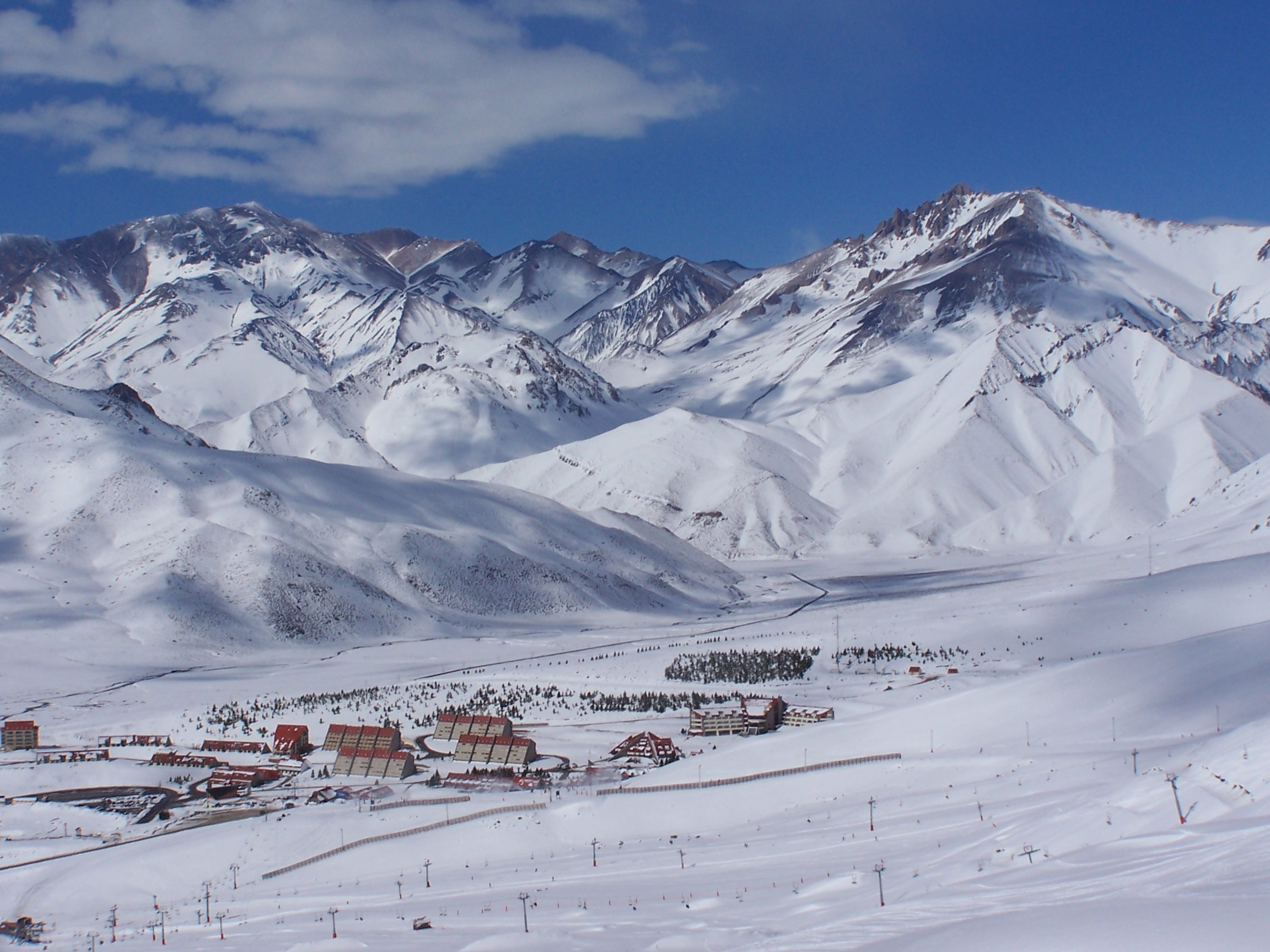
- Cerro Aconcagua Valley of the Moon Cerro Negro Cuesta de Huaco Atuel Canyon Las Leñas ski resort

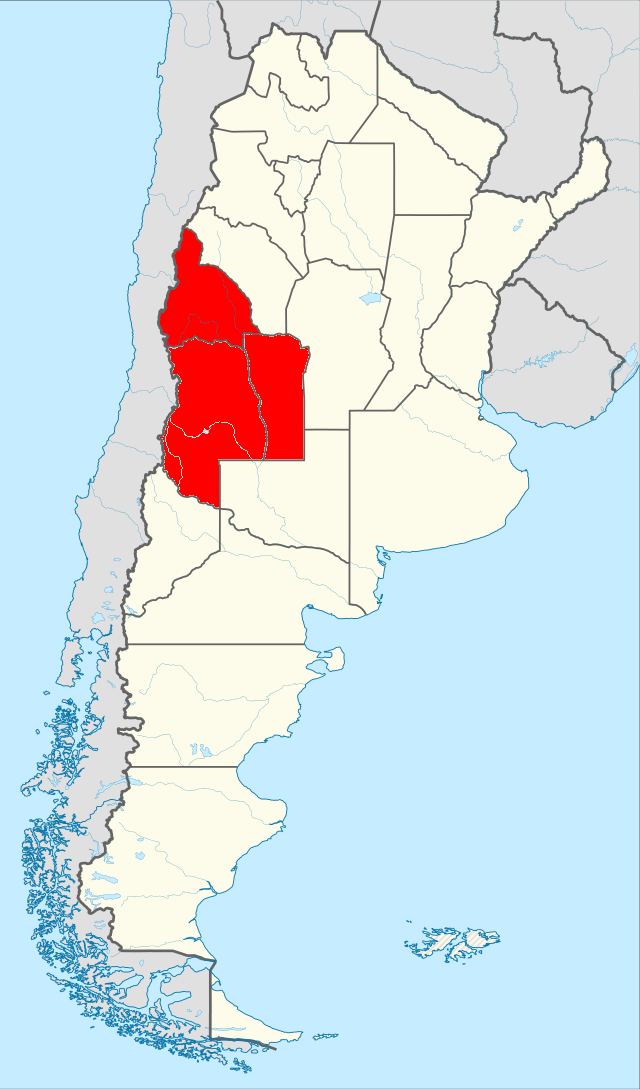
- Location of Cuyo
- Country: Argentina

Area
  - Total: 315,226 km^{2} (121,709 sq mi)

Population (2022)
  - Total: 3,390,766
  - Density: 10.7566/km^{2} (27.8595/sq mi)
- Demonym: Cuyan
- Natural regions: Monte Desert; Patagonian Desert; High Monte; Southern Andean steppe
- Provinces: Mendoza, San Juan, San Luis
- Largest cities: Mendoza; San Juan; San Luis; San Rafael

Cuyo is the wine-producing, mountainous region of central-west Argentina. Historically it comprised the provinces of San Juan, San Luis and Mendoza. The modern New Cuyo includes both Cuyo proper and the province of La Rioja. New Cuyo is a political and economic macroregion, but culturally La Rioja is part of the North-West rather than of Cuyo.

Cuyo has some of the most popular tourist attractions in Argentina and the highest mountain massifs in the Andes, including Aconcagua itself, the highest peak outside Asia, and the Ischigualasto Provincial Park.

The soil is arid and reddish, crossed by few rivers. Most of the rivers are fed by the thawing of snow on the peaks, and their volume of water increases considerably in spring. The Desaguadero River is the main collector, receiving waters from the Bermejo, Vinchina and Salado before reaching the Colorado River.

Viticulture is one of the main activities of the area. The wine production of the region represents almost 80% of national production, and the wines are highly regarded throughout the world. Olives, potatoes, tomatoes and some fruits are also cultivated, and there is production of sweets and preserved foodstuffs. Quarrying and oil exploitation are other important industries.

The cities and towns in the region are characterised by colonial low houses and churches, and narrow streets, contrasting in the principal cities with the modern parts. The Universidad Nacional de Cuyo, founded in 1939, is the most important within these provinces, and has its campus in Mendoza, but has faculties as far as Río Negro.

== Statistics ==
Population and area of provinces, according to the 2001 census [INDEC]:

Province	Population	% of Cuyo	Area (km^{2})	% of Cuyo	Density (inhabitants/km^{2})
Mendoza	1,579,651	55.28	148,827	36.76	10.6
San Juan	620,023	21.70	89,651	22.14	6.9
San Luis	367,933	12.88	76,748	18.95	4.8
La Rioja	289,983	10.15	89,680	22.15	3.2
Cuyo Total	2,857,590	100	404,906	100	7.1
Argentina Total	36,260,130	-	2,780,403^{1}	-	13.0

Provincial Gross Domestic Product (nominal) per capita, the value of all final goods and services produced within a nation in a given year, divided by the average population for the same year is in the table below, based on data for the year 2013 for the 23 provinces:

Rank	Province	GDP	($) per capita
1	Mendoza	22,023	11,957
2	San Juan	7,341	10,170
3	San Luis	6,117	13,201
4	La Rioja (Argentina)	2,447	6,844

== Climate ==
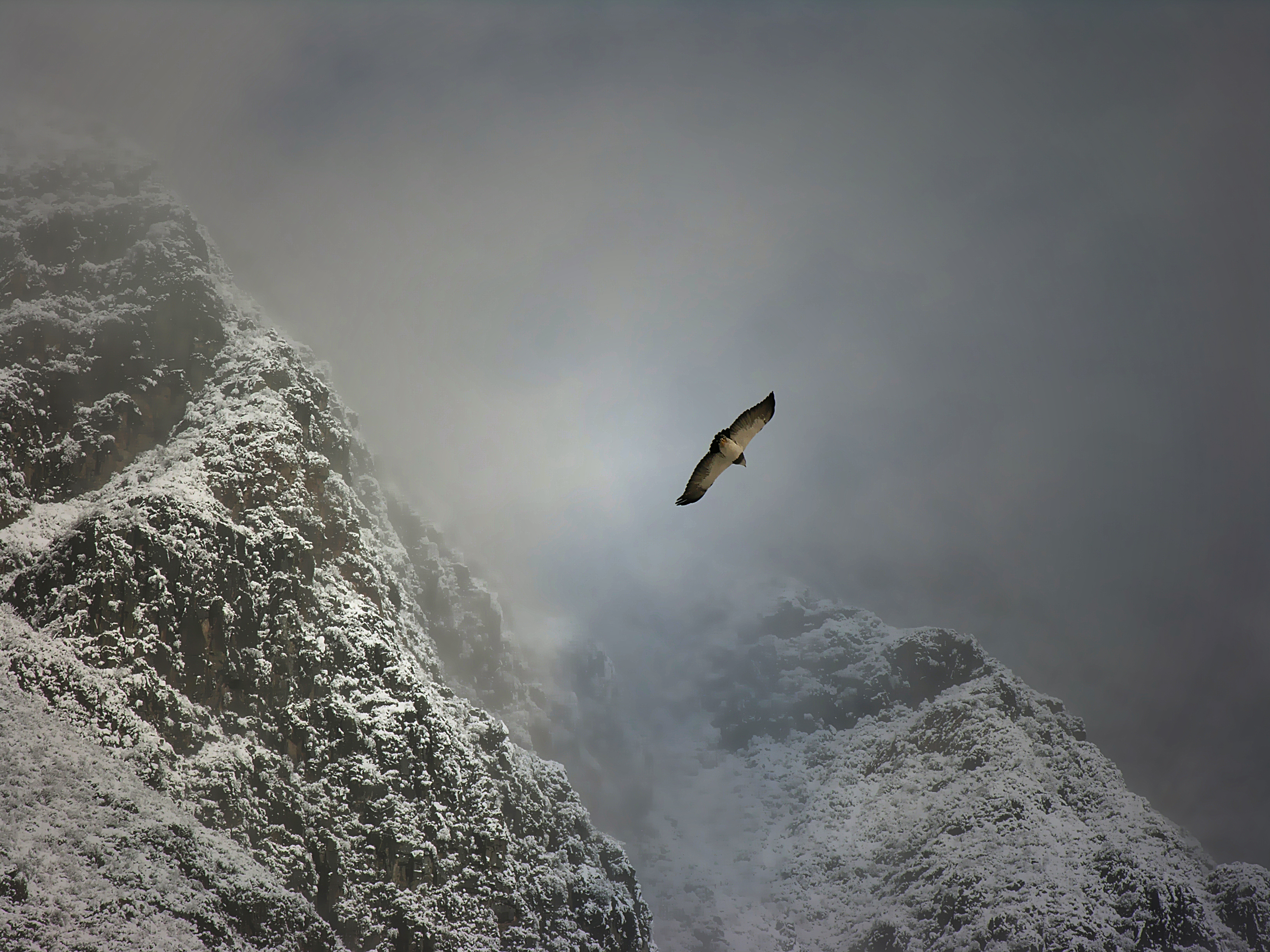
Colder weather predominates at higher elevations which can receive snow during the winter

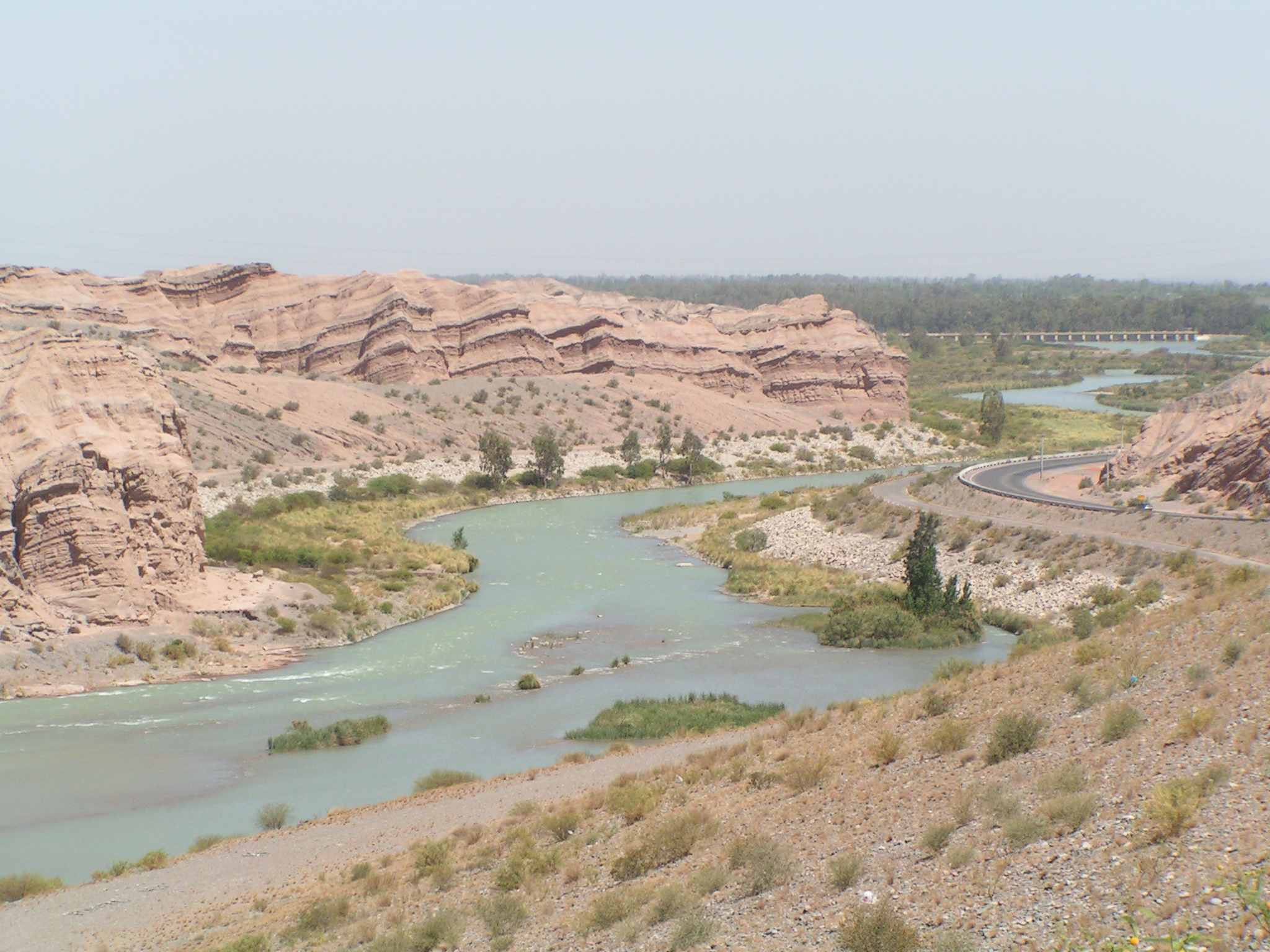
Much of the region is dry, depending on rivers for irrigation

The region of Cuyo has an arid climate or a semi-arid climate with an average annual precipitation of about 100 to 500 millimetres (4 to 20 in) that is generally unreliable from year to year. The region, which encompasses a wide range of latitudes combined with elevations ranging from 500 m to nearly 7,000 m means that it has a diverse range of different climates. In general, most of the region has a temperate climate with higher elevation valleys having a more milder climate. At the highest elevations (over 4,000 m), icy conditions persist year round. The diurnal range is very large with very hot temperatures during the day followed by cold nights. Amongst all locations in Argentina, the region has the largest diurnal range in the country with areas in San Juan Province having a diurnal range exceeding 19.1 °C (34.38 °F). The Andes prevent rain–bearing clouds from the Pacific Ocean from coming in, while its latitude puts it in a band of the sub-tropical high pressure belt keeping this region dry. With very low humidity, abundant sunshine throughout the year, and a temperate climate, the region is suitable for wine production. Droughts are often frequent and prolonged. The Cuyo region is influenced by the subtropical, semi–permanent South Atlantic anticyclone to the east in the Atlantic, the semi-permanent South Pacific anticyclone to the west of the Andes, the development of a low pressure system ("Chaco low") over northern Argentina and westerlies in the southern parts of the region. Most of the precipitation falls during the summer, when hot temperatures and high insolation lead to the development of a low pressure system ("Chaco low") situated over northern Argentina that interacts with the South Atlantic anticyclone to generate a pressure gradient that brings moist easterly winds to the region, favouring precipitation, which mostly occurs in the form of convective thunderstorms. More than 85% of the annual rainfall occurs from October to March, which represents the warm season. In contrast, the winter months are dry due to these systems weakening, and the lower insolation that weakens the Chaco low over northern Argentina. Eastern and southeastern areas of the region receive more precipitation than the western areas since they receive more summer rainfall. As such, most of Mendoza province and San Juan province receive the lowest annual precipitation with mean summer precipitation averaging less than 100 mm (3.9 in) and in rare cases, no summer rainfall. Further eastwards in San Luis province, mean summer rainfall averages around 500 mm (20 in) and can exceed 700 mm (28 in) in some areas. Higher elevation locations receive precipitation in the form of snow during the winter months. In the Cuyo region, annual precipitation is highly variable from year to year and appears to follow a cycle between dry and wet years in periods of about 2, 4–5, 6–8, and 16–22 years. In wet years, easterly winds caused by the subtropical South Atlantic anticyclone are stronger, which causes more moisture towards this region while during the dry years, these winds are weaker.

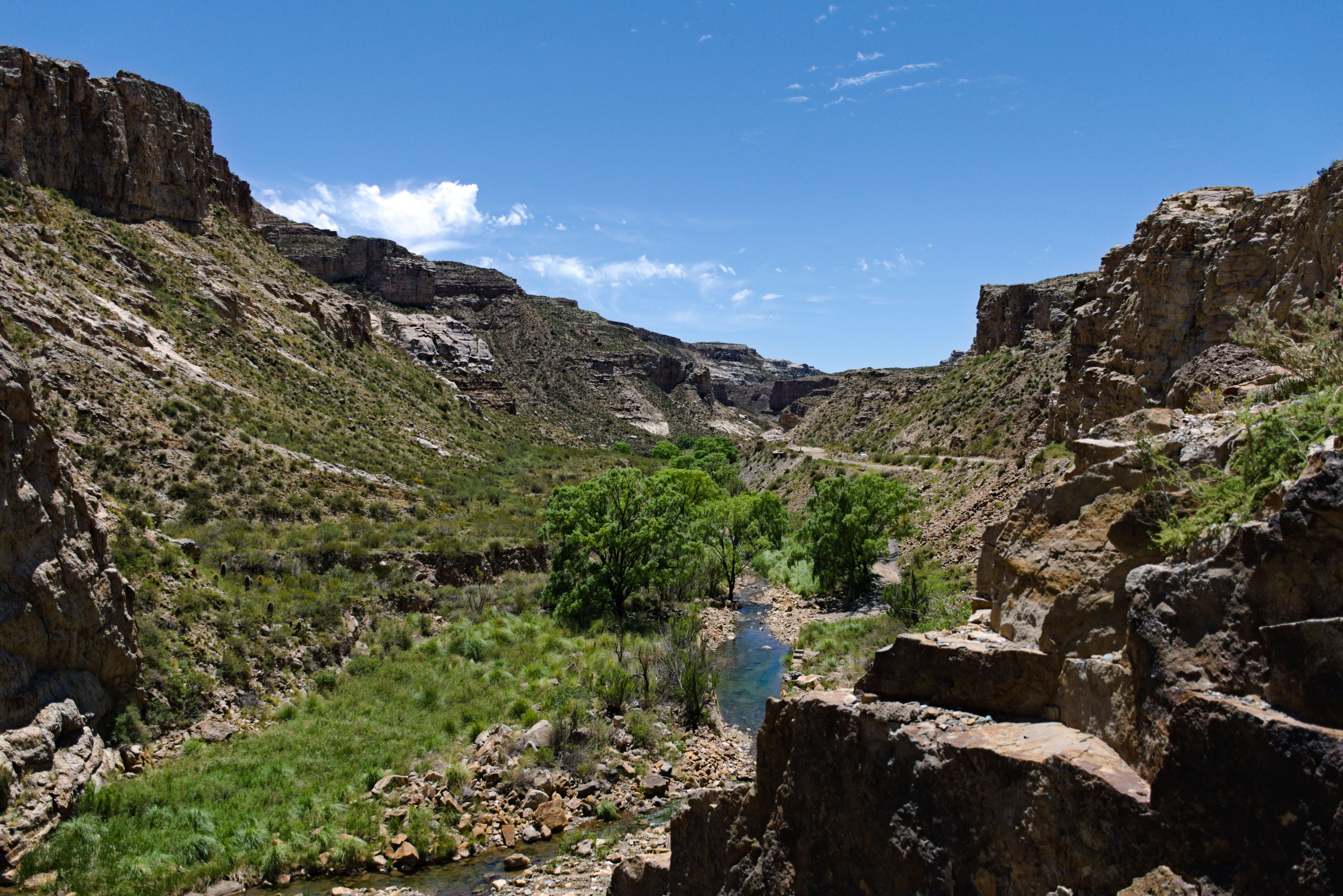
The Atuel River crossing the homonymous Canyon.

Summers in the region are hot and generally very sunny, averaging as much as 10 hours per day. In contrast, winters are dry and cold and average around 7–8 hours of sunshine per day. Since this region has a wide range of elevations, ranging from 500 m to nearly 7,000 m, temperatures can vary widely with elevation. In the lowlands of Mendoza province, which lie at an elevation of around 440 m to 530 m, mean annual temperatures range from 18.2 to 18.7 °C (64.8 to 65.7 °F) in the northern parts to 15 °C (59 °F) in the south. At higher elevation locations and in the western parts of Mendoza province, the mean annual temperatures range from −1.7 °C (28.9 °F) in Cristo Redentor to 13.6 °C (56.5 °F) with a larger difference in temperatures between winter and summer months. In San Juan Province, the mean annual temperature ranges from 17.3 °C (63.1 °F) in the provincial capital to −0.2 °C (31.6 °F). In San Luis province, mean annual temperatures range from 15.8 °C (60.4 °F) in Villa Reynolds to 16.6 °C (61.9 °F) in the provincial capital. The Sierras Pampeanas, which cross into both San Juan province and San Luis province have a milder climate with mean annual temperatures ranging from 12 to 18 °C (53.6 to 64.4 °F). In all locations, at elevations over 3,800 m, permafrost is present while icy conditions persist year round at elevations over 4,000 m.

The Zonda, a Foehn wind characterized by warm, dry air can cause temperatures to exceed 30 °C (86.0 °F) in some cases while in summer, temperatures can exceed 45 °C (113.0 °F) such as in 2003. This wind often precedes following a cold front passage across Argentina and tends to occur when a low pressure system brings heavy rain to the Chilean side, and when an upper-level trough allows the winds to pass over the Andes to descend downwards. As such, when a zonda wind event occurs, the temperature may raise as much as 20 °C (68.0 °F) in a few hours with humidity approaching 0%. In contrast, cold waves are also common, owing to the Andes channeling cold air from the south, allowing cold fronts to frequently come during the winter months, causing cool to cold temperatures with temperatures that can fall below freezing. Temperatures can dip below −10 to −30 °C (14.0 to −22.0 °F) at the higher elevations.

== Tourism ==
As in other parts of Argentina, nature tourism is an important source of income. Amongst sites that receive a large number of visitors, the following are its main attractions:

- Aconcagua
- Fiesta Nacional de la Vendimia
- Las Leñas
- Biosphere Reserve of Ñacuñán
- San Rafael
- Barreal
- Difunta Correa
- Ischigualasto
- El Trapiche
- Merlo
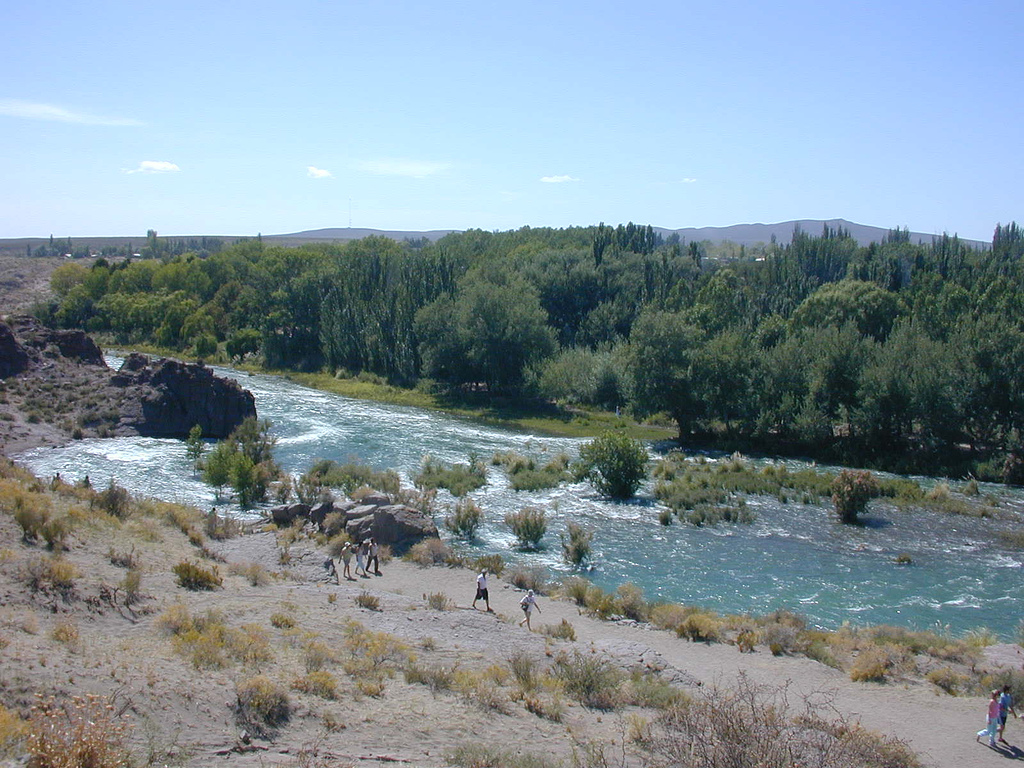
The Atuel River, Mendoza Province.

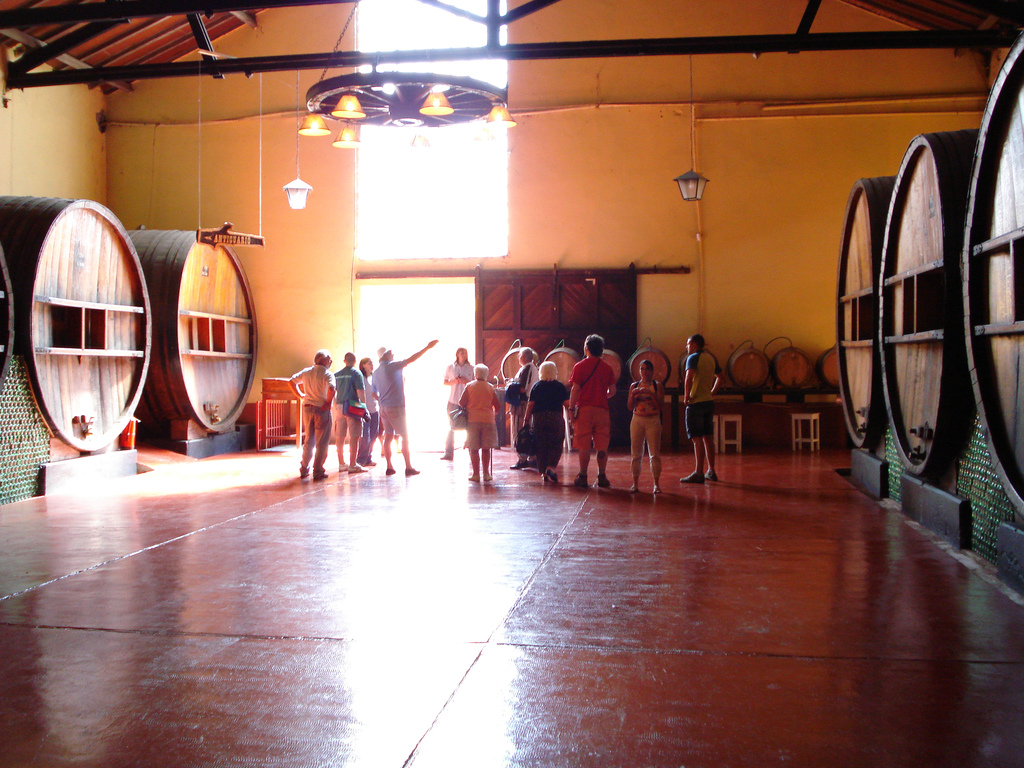
In the Cuyo region, considerable agroindustrial wine production stands out.

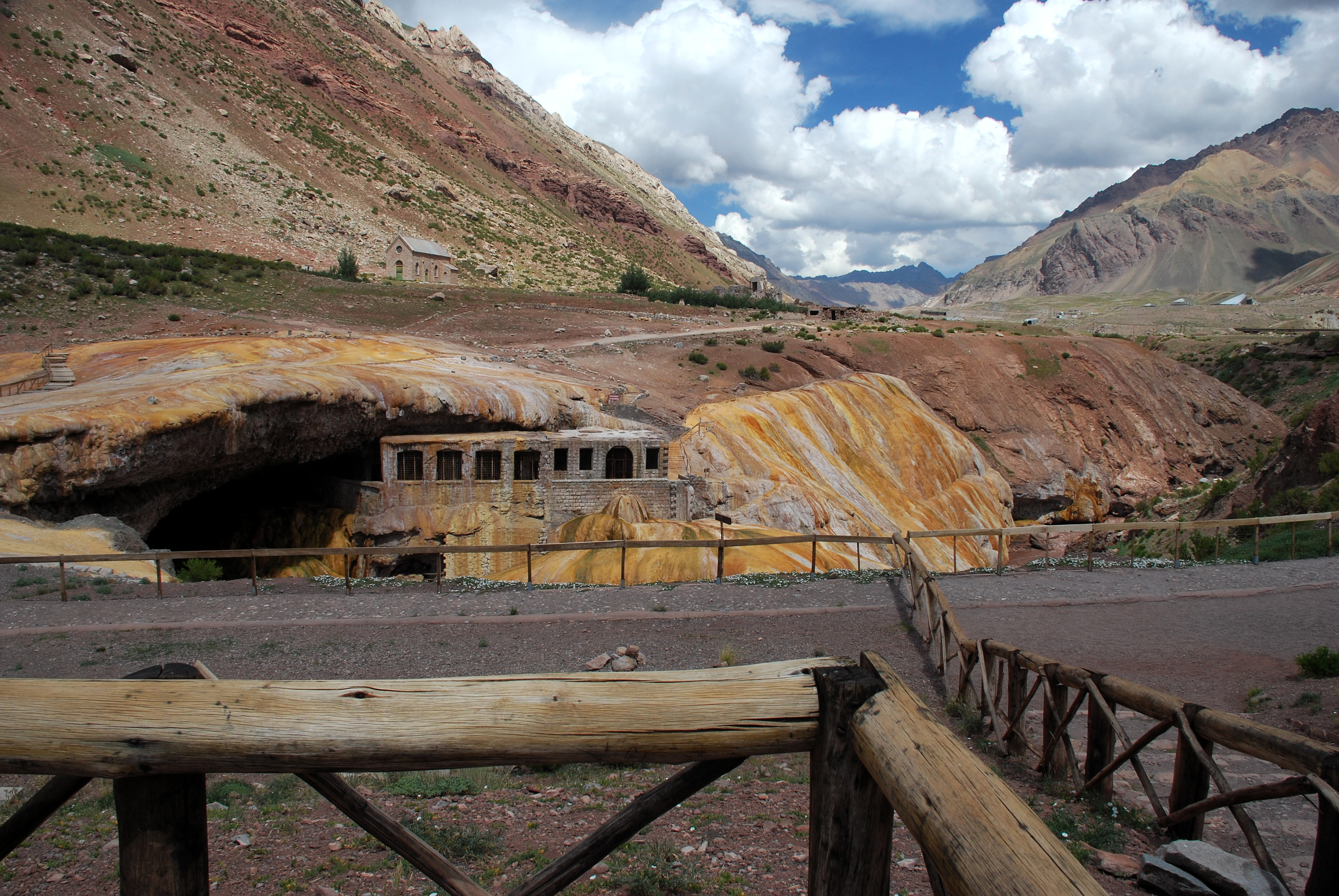
Puente del Inca natural monument.

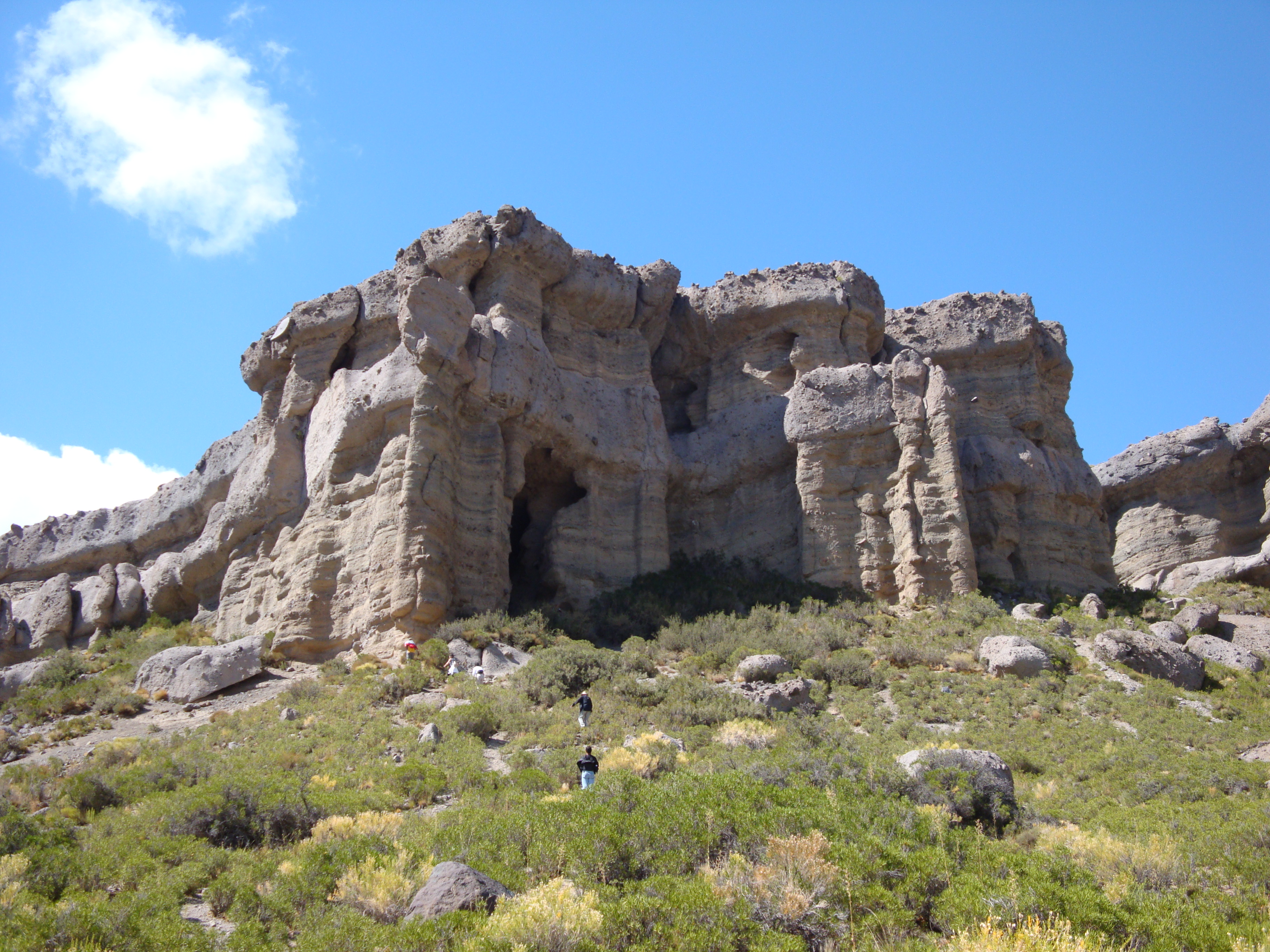
The Pincheira's Castles Provincial Reserve.
