= Los Castillos =

Los Castillos may refer to:

- Los Castillos, Catamarca, Argentina
- Los Castillos, Herrera, Panama
- Los Castillos, Veraguas, Panama

== See also ==
- Castillos (disambiguation)
- Castillos, a small city in the Rocha Department of southeastern Uruguay
- Reserva Provincial Castillos de Pincheira, a protected natural area in Argentina
