= Castillos (disambiguation) =

Castillos is a small city in the Rocha Department of southeastern Uruguay.

Castillos may also refer to:

- Osiris Rodríguez Castillos, an Uruguayan writer, poet, composer and singer
- Reserva Provincial Castillos de Pincheira, a protected natural area in Argentina

== See also ==
- Los Castillos (disambiguation)
- Castillo (disambiguation)
