= Jesuit Block and Estancias of Córdoba =

UNESCO World Heritage Site
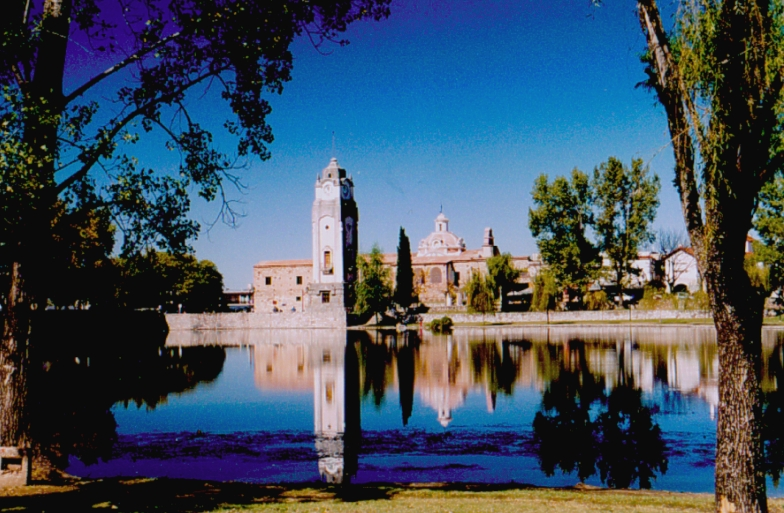
- View of the Estancia Alta Gracia

- Location within Argentina
- Location: Córdoba Province, Argentina
- Includes: 1. Jesuit Block; 2. Estancia of Alta Gracia; 3. Estancia of Jesús María; 4. Estancia of Santa Catalina; 5. Estancia of Caroya; 6. Estancia of La Candelaría
- Criteria: Cultural: (ii), (iv)
- Reference: 995
- Inscription: 2000 (24th Session)
- Area: 38.12 ha (94.2 acres)
- Coordinates: 31°25′14″S 64°11′28″W

The Jesuit Block and Estancias of Córdoba (Spanish: Manzana Jesuítica y Estancias de Córdoba) are a collection of buildings and sites formerly used by the Jesuits in the province of Córdoba, Argentina, which were named a World Heritage Site in 2000.

== The sites ==
The Manzana Jesuítica (English: Jesuit Block) contains parts of the University of Córdoba, one of the oldest universities in South America, the Monserrat Secondary School, a church and residence buildings. The first Jesuits arrived in Córdoba in 1599, with the university being founded in 1613. To maintain such a project, the Jesuits operated six Estancias (residences) around the province of Córdoba, named Caroya, Jesús María, Santa Catalina, Alta Gracia, Candelaria and San Ignacio, with the latter not having been preserved until today.

Each Estancia has its own church and set of buildings. In many cases, towns grew around the estancias, such as in Alta Gracia, the closest to the Jesuit Block in the city of Córdoba. The estancias are between 38 and 130 km from the city of Córdoba.

== History ==
After the founding of the university, the different estancias were started between 1616 (La Caroya) and 1683 (La Candelaria). The estancias raised cattle, fruit and crops.

The estancias and the block had to be left by the Jesuits, following the 1767 decree by King Charles III of Spain that expelled them from the continent. They were then run by the Franciscans until 1853, when the Jesuits returned to The Americas. Nevertheless, the university and the high-school were nationalized a year later.

== Tourism ==
The Jesuit Block and the Estancias can be visited by tourists; the Road of the Jesuit Estancias is approximately 250 kilometres (160 mi) in length.

== People ==
Between 1990 and 1992, Jorge Mario Bergoglio, who would later become Pope Francis, lived in Córdoba in the Jesuit block.

== See also ==
- List of Jesuit sites
