= Los Castillos, Catamarca =

Coordinates: 27°58′S 65°48′W

Los Castillos
- Municipality and village
- Interactive map of Los Castillos
- Country: Argentina
- Province: Catamarca Province
- Time zone: UTC−3 (ART)

Los Castillos is a village and municipality in Catamarca Province in northwestern Argentina.
