= Biosphere Reserve of Ñacuñan =

Coordinates: 34°02′S 67°55′W

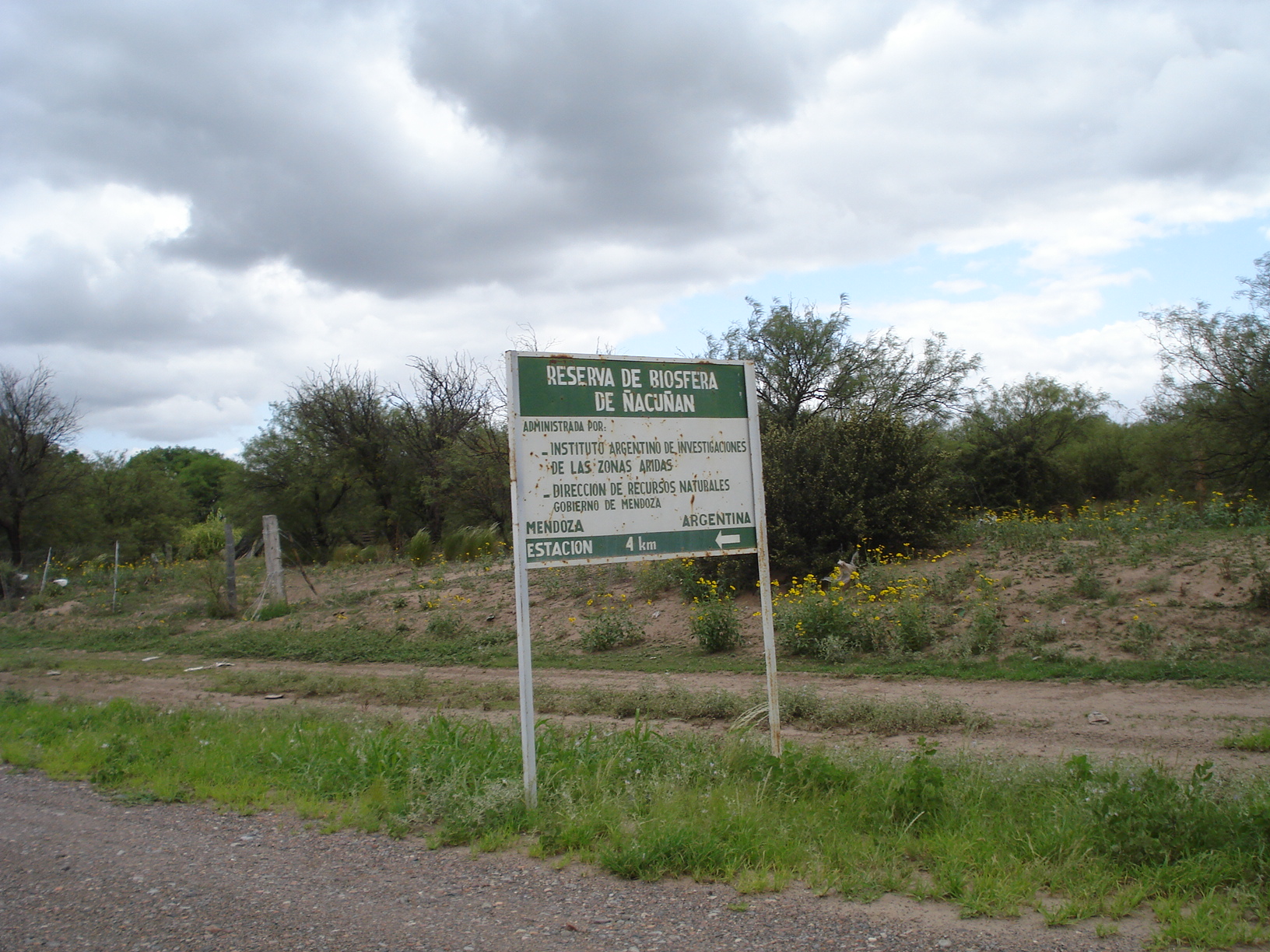
Biosphere Reserve of Ñacuñan Sign Post

The Biosphere Reserve of Ñacuñan is located in the Mendoza Province, Argentina. It is a composed of three main geomorphological areas.
