= Atuel River =

River in Argentina

Coordinates: 34°33′17″S 70°05′06″W

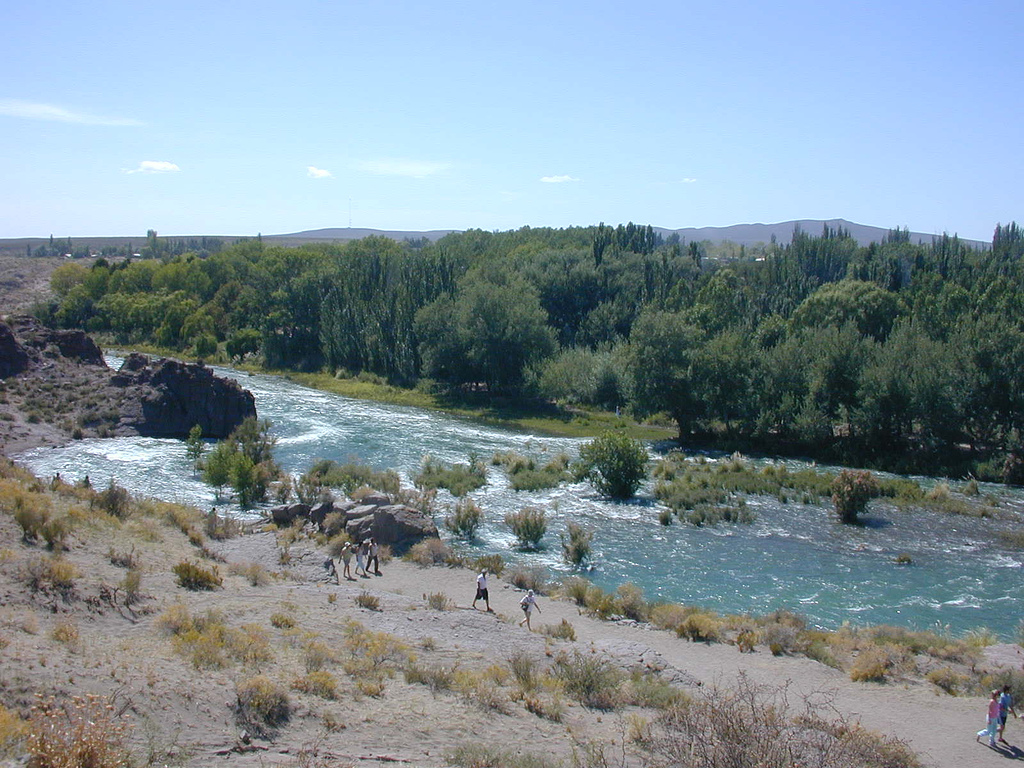
The course of the Atuel near San Rafael, Mendoza

The Atuel River is a river located mainly in the south of the Argentine province of Mendoza, with its last part in La Pampa. It is a tributary of the Desaguadero River.

The Atuel is the longest river in Mendoza. It is born in the Andes range, at 3,250 metres (10,660 ft) above mean sea level, from the glacial Atuel Lake. It has a mean flow of 31.8 cubic metres per second (1,120 cu ft/s), and its drainage basin covers 13,000 square kilometres (5,000 sq mi). Its volume increases from November to March (around the summer).

== Canyon ==
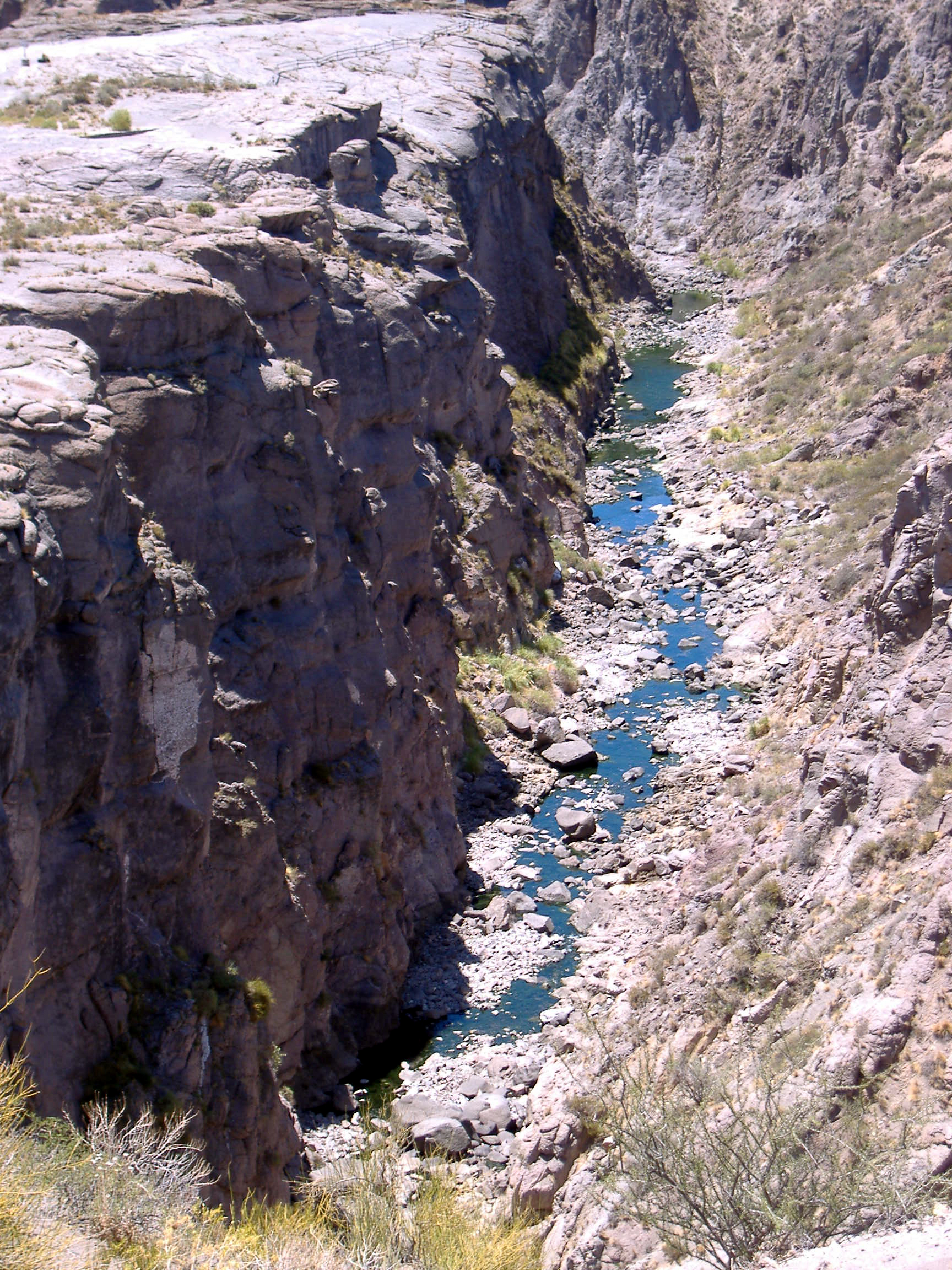
The Atuel Canyon

As it approaches the city of San Rafael, Mendoza, from the southwest, the Atuel is turned into a reservoir with an area of 96 square kilometres (37 sq mi) by the El Nihuil Dam. Immediately after El Nihuil, the river becomes entrenched along a canyon and forms rapids. The canyon is about 60 kilometres (37 mi) long, and during its course the river falls from 1,250 to 700 metres (4,100 to 2,300 ft) above sea level. This level difference is taken advantage of by four hydroelectric power stations (Nihuil I, II, III and IV). Most of the Atuel's flow at this point has been redirected through a system of tunnels inside the mountains, connecting the chain of reservoirs.

The Atuel Canyon area is a major tourist attraction, featuring hotels, camping sites, country clubs and other lodging facilities. The rapids are employed for rafting and canoeing; they are classified between class II (novice) and IV (advanced) in the International Scale of River Difficulty.

The canyon ends at Rincón del Atuel. From there on the river flows along a plain, becoming wider and meandering until reaching the Desaguadero River.
