= Destino Argentina =

Travel agency in Argentina

Based in the city of Buenos Aires, Destino Argentina is one of the most important boards for the tourist promotion of Argentina. Cultural centres, museums, theatres, galleries, shopping malls, vineyards, big luxury hotels and small boutique hotels, lodges, spas, gourmet restaurants, airlines, tour operators, car rental firms, media and consultancy agencies, and many other enterprises belonging to the hospitality industry are members of this non-profit organization created in 2003.

As its goal is to promote Argentina in foreign countries as a first-class tourist destination, the organization and coordination of press trips with journalists of international media is the main activity. Japan and Qatar, Spain and Colombia, Australia and China, Germany and Russia are some the countries where the assisted media are based, according to the information provided in the website. Destino Argentina maintains strategic agreements with the National Institute for Touristic Promotion (InProTur), the National Ministry of Tourism, the Tourism Board of the City of Buenos Aires, the Patagonia Tourism Board and many other regional tourism organizations.
