= Atuel Canyon =

Narrow canyon in Argentina

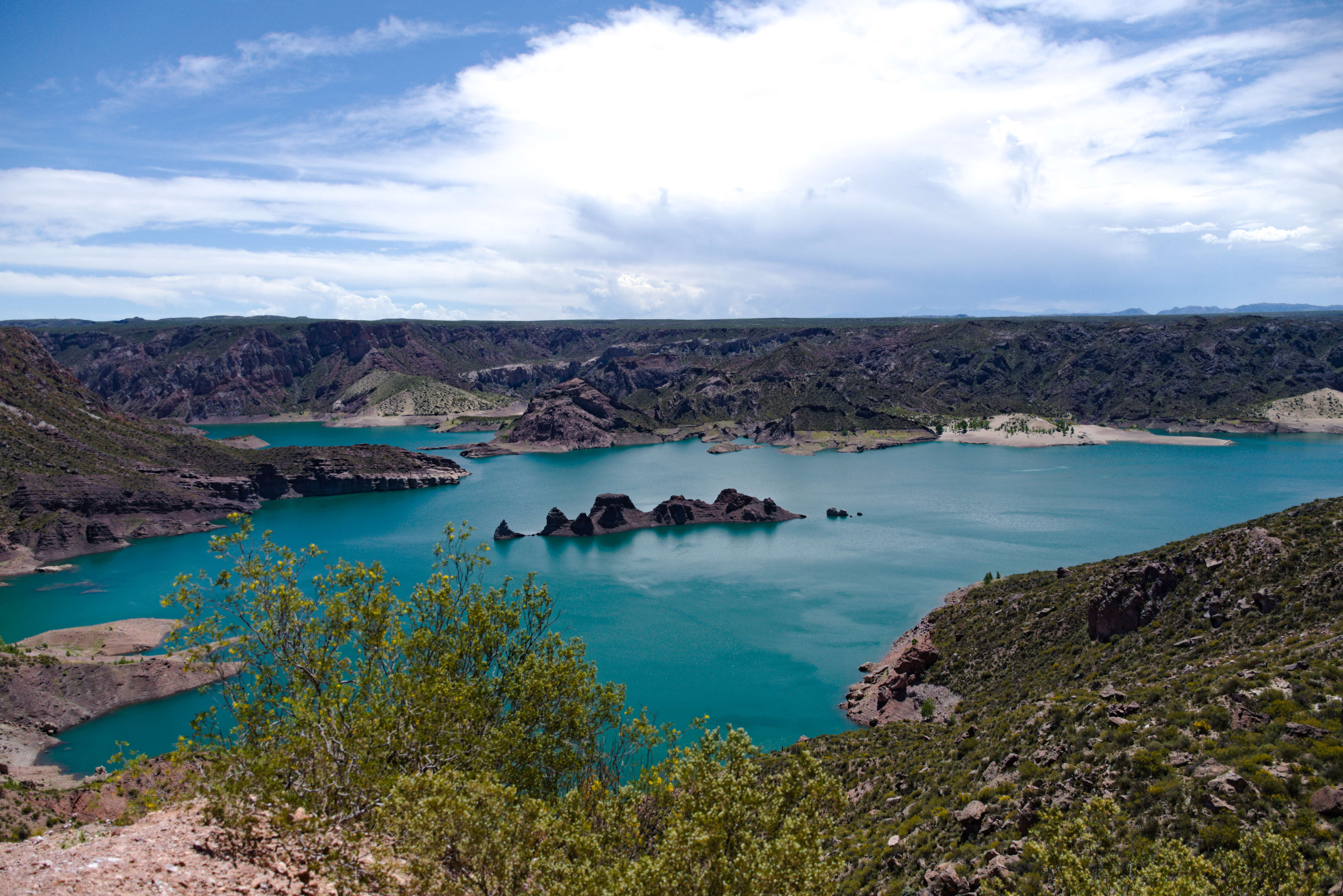
- View of the Valle Grande Reservoir and the Atuel River flowing through the Canyon.

Geography
- Location: Mendoza, Argentina
- Coordinates: 35°00′24″S 68°39′08″W
- Interactive map of Atuel Canyon

The Atuel Canyon (in Spanish Cañón del Atuel) is a narrow canyon and popular tourist attraction within Valle Grande, Argentina. The canyon is popular location for adventure sports, including river rafting, hiking, climbing, horse riding and mountain biking.

The Atuel River flows through the base of the canyon and contains several rapids, which are used for rafting and canoeing. Those rapids are classified between class II (novice) and IV (advanced) in the International Scale of River Difficulty.

The surrounding area includes many hotels, camping sites, country clubs and other lodging facilities.

== Geography ==
The canyon is 37 km (23 mi) from the city of San Rafael, where it starts at Embalse El Nihuil and ends in Embalse Valle Grande. The canyon was formed by river and wind erosion.
