= Reserva Provincial Castillos de Pincheira =

Monument and nature reserve in Argentina

Coordinates: 35°30′55.5″S 69°47′45.9″W

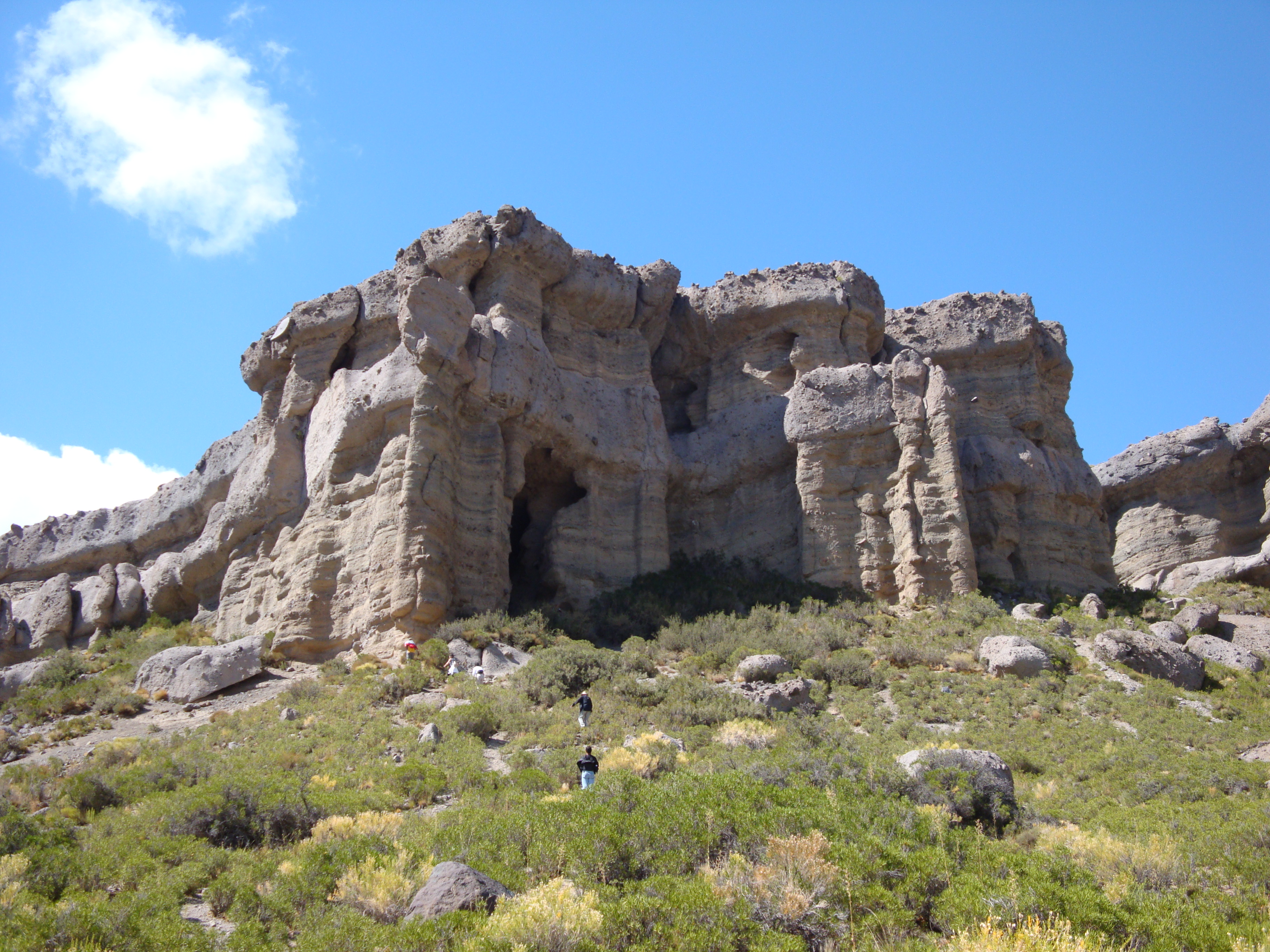
Natural monument called Castillos de Pincheira.

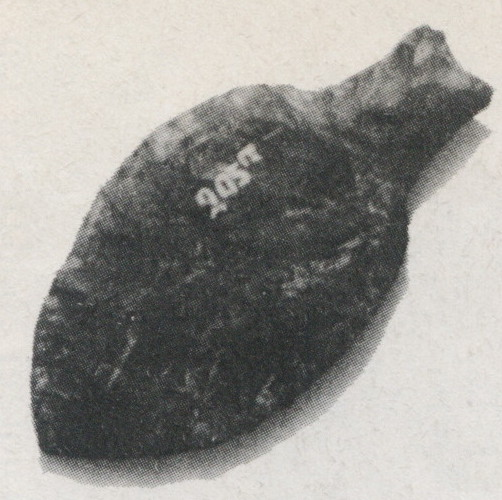
A Huarpe arrowhead

The Reserva Provincial Castillos de Pincheira (Spanish: Pincheira's Castles Provincial Reserve) is a natural area protected in Argentina. It's located about 27 kilometres (17 mi) to the west of the city of Malargüe in the southern part of the Mendoza Province.

It is a natural monument sculpted by erosive actions, mainly of glaciers. Its form is very similar to a giant castle, in the front flow the Malargüe River and very near the Pincheira Stream.

According to the legend, this site was a refuge for the Chilean bandits called Pincheira brothers, during the beginning of the 20th century. In the vicinity arrowheads attributed to the Huarpes, an ancient ethnic group who inhabited the zone, are common.
