= Mission Museum =

Museum in Brazil

- Museu das Missões
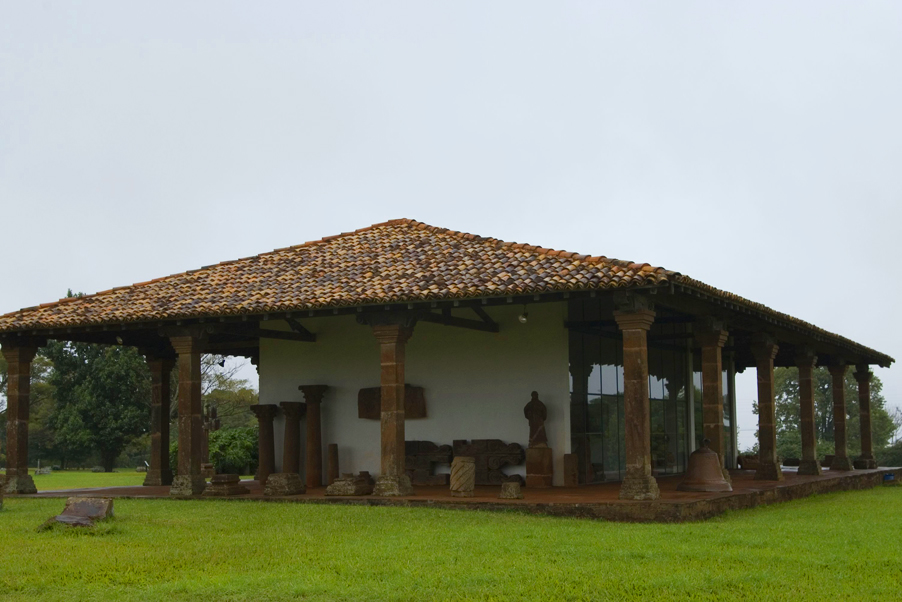
- Mission Museum, São Miguel das Missões, Rio Grande do Sul

- Location of the Mission Museum in Brazil
- Established: 8 March 1940
- Location: São Miguel das Missões, Rio Grande do Sul, Brazil
- Coordinates: 28.549963°S 54.554683°W
- Architect: Lúcio Costa

The Mission Museum (Portuguese: Museu das Missões) is a historical museum in São Miguel das Missões, Rio Grande do Sul, Brazil. It is located on the site of the ruins of São Miguel das Missões, a jesuit reduction including the Church of São Miguel Arcanjo and surrounding ruins. The museum houses works from the church and statuary of the Rio Grande do Sul region. The museum was designed by the architect Lúcio Costa (1902–1998) and was built from materials from the ruins. It was conceived as an open shelter for religious works related to the church site; transparent glass panels were soon added.

== Construction ==
The creation of the museum was one of the first initiatives of the government organization now known as National Institute of Historic and Artistic Heritage, known at the time as SPHAN. SPHAN was created in 1937 and in the same year the architect Lúcio Costa (1902–1998) was sent by the organization to Rio Grande do Sul to analyze the remnants of the Sete Povos das Missões (Seven Peoples of the Missions) and propose conservation measures for the site.

The architect, Lucas Mayerhofer, directed the stabilization works in the (Church of São Miguel) and designed a museum building to house statuary related to the site. It officially opened in 1940. The museum became part of the UNESCO World Heritage Site titled "Jesuit Missions of the Guaranis" in 1984.

== Destruction ==
The museum was almost completely destroyed by a tornado on April 26, 2016. Both the structure, its glass walls, and 83 Jesuit statues were significantly damaged.
