= Nuestra Señora de Santa Ana =

UNESCO World Heritage Site
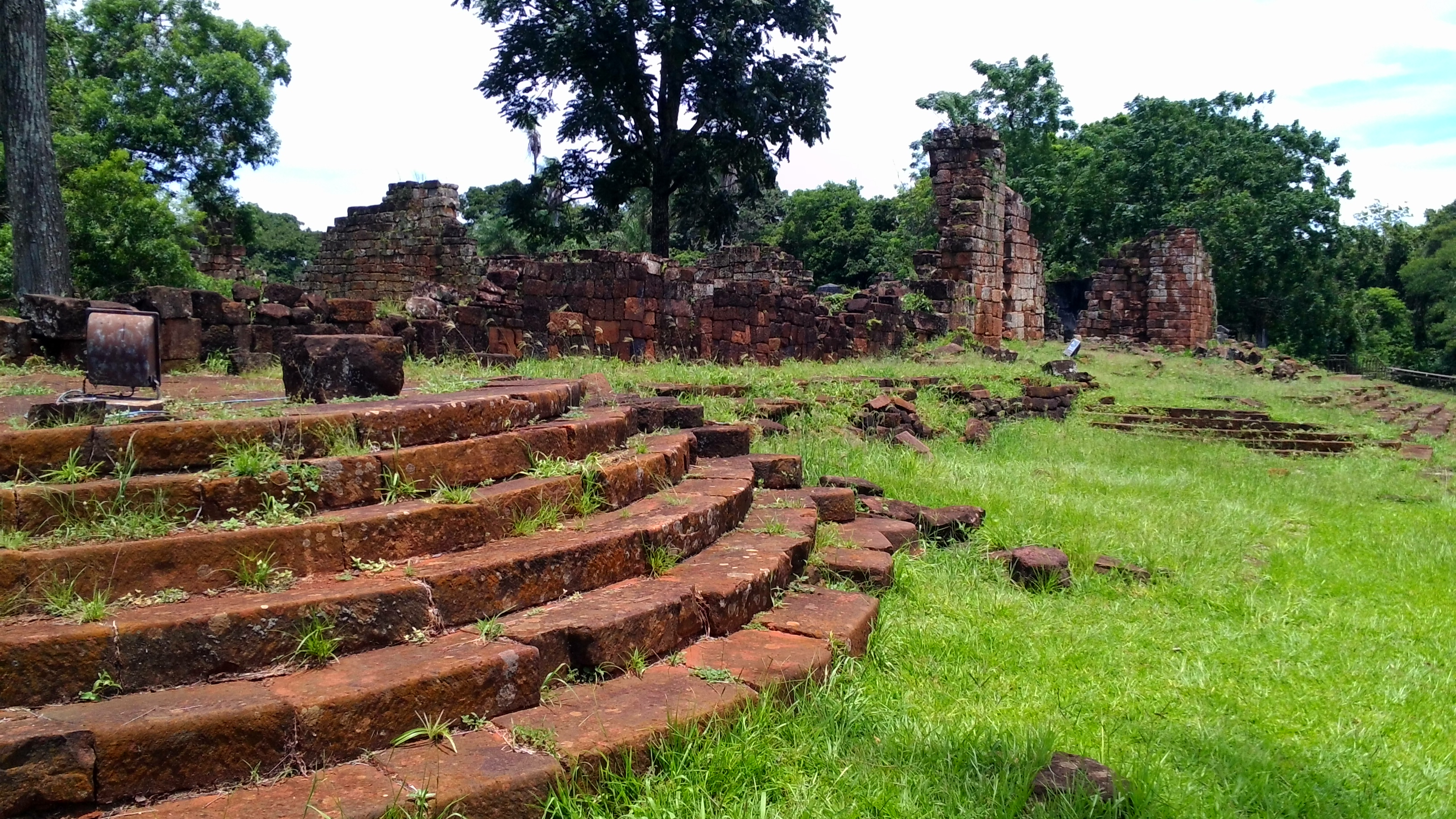

- Location within Argentina
- Location: Misiones Province, Argentina
- Part of: Jesuit Missions of the Guaranis: San Ignacio Mini, Santa Ana, Nuestra Señora de Loreto and Santa Maria Mayor (Argentina), Ruins of Sao Miguel das Missoes (Brazil)
- Criteria: Cultural: (iv)
- Reference: 275bis-003
- Inscription: 1983 (7th Session)
- Extensions: 1984
- Coordinates: 27°23′S 55°34′W -->

Reducción de Nuestra Señora de Santa Ana (Reduction of Our Lady of Saint Ana) was one of the many colonial missions for Indian Reductions founded in the 17th century by the Jesuits in South America during the Spanish colonial period.

The mission was within the colonial Province of Paraguay. Its present-day ruins are located in Misiones Province, Argentina.

== Jesuit Missions of the Guaranis ==
The Spanish relocated the indigenous Guaraní people from their home villages to the reduction sites, where they established mission centers. These generally were modeled on Spanish rural villages, complete with a town square bounded by a church and administrative buildings. Nuestra Señora de Santa Ana was founded in 1633, and is located in the present-day Candelaria Department of the Misiones Province, Argentina.

It is 2 kilometers from Santa Ana, the chief city of the Candelaria Department. The ruins of Nuestra Señora de Santa Ana are not far from the reduccion site of San Ignacio Miní. Like most settlements of the era, the reducciones were located along waterways, which supplied drinking and washing water, and were used for transportation and trade.

In 1984 Mission Nuestra Señora de Santa Ana was one of four sites of Jesuit reductions in Argentina and one in Brazil to be declared by UNESCO the Jesuit Missions of the Guaranis World Heritage Sites.

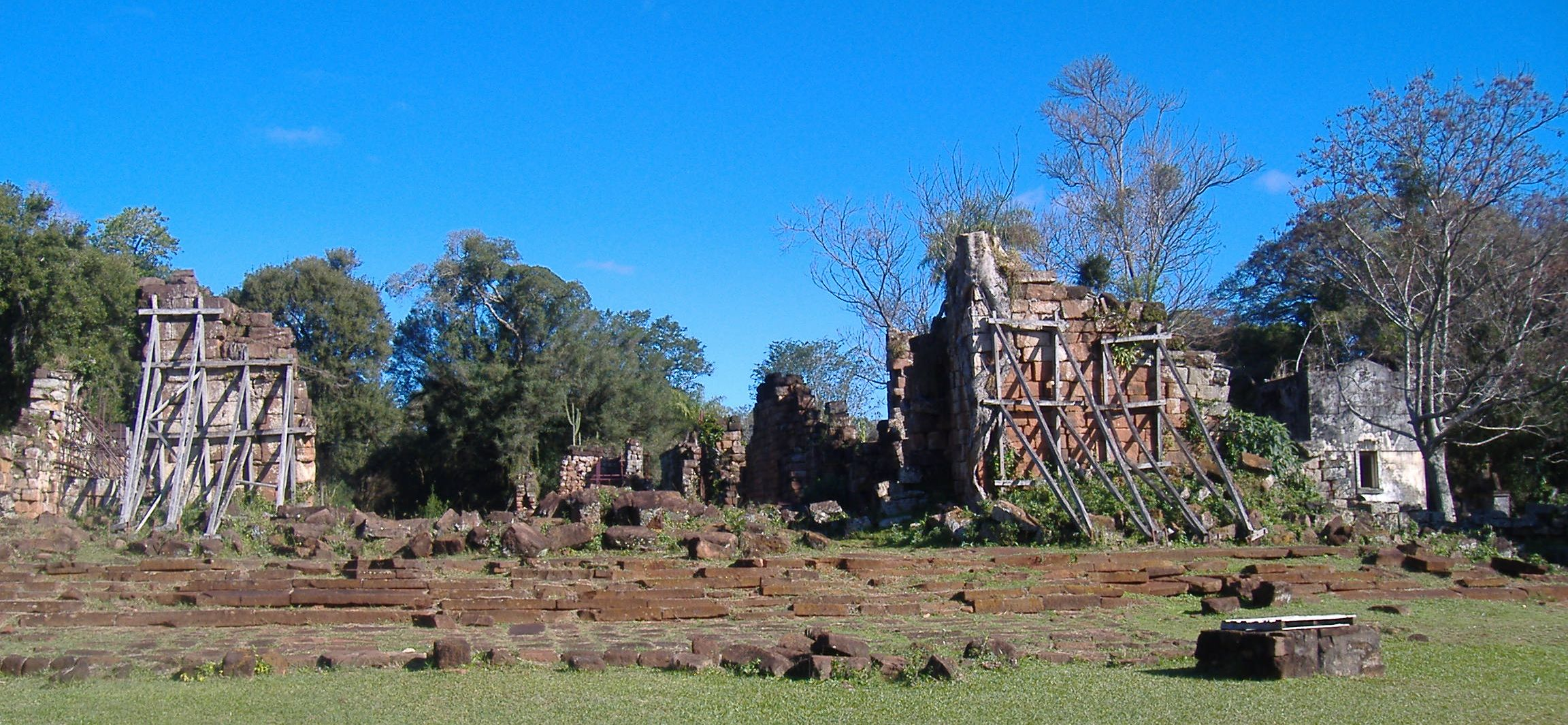
Mission church walls in ruin.

== See also ==
- Spanish Jesuit Missions of the Guaranis-related topics
- Governorate of the Río de la Plata
- Viceroyalty of the Río de la Plata
- List of Jesuit sites
