= Nuestra Señora de Loreto =

UNESCO World Heritage Site
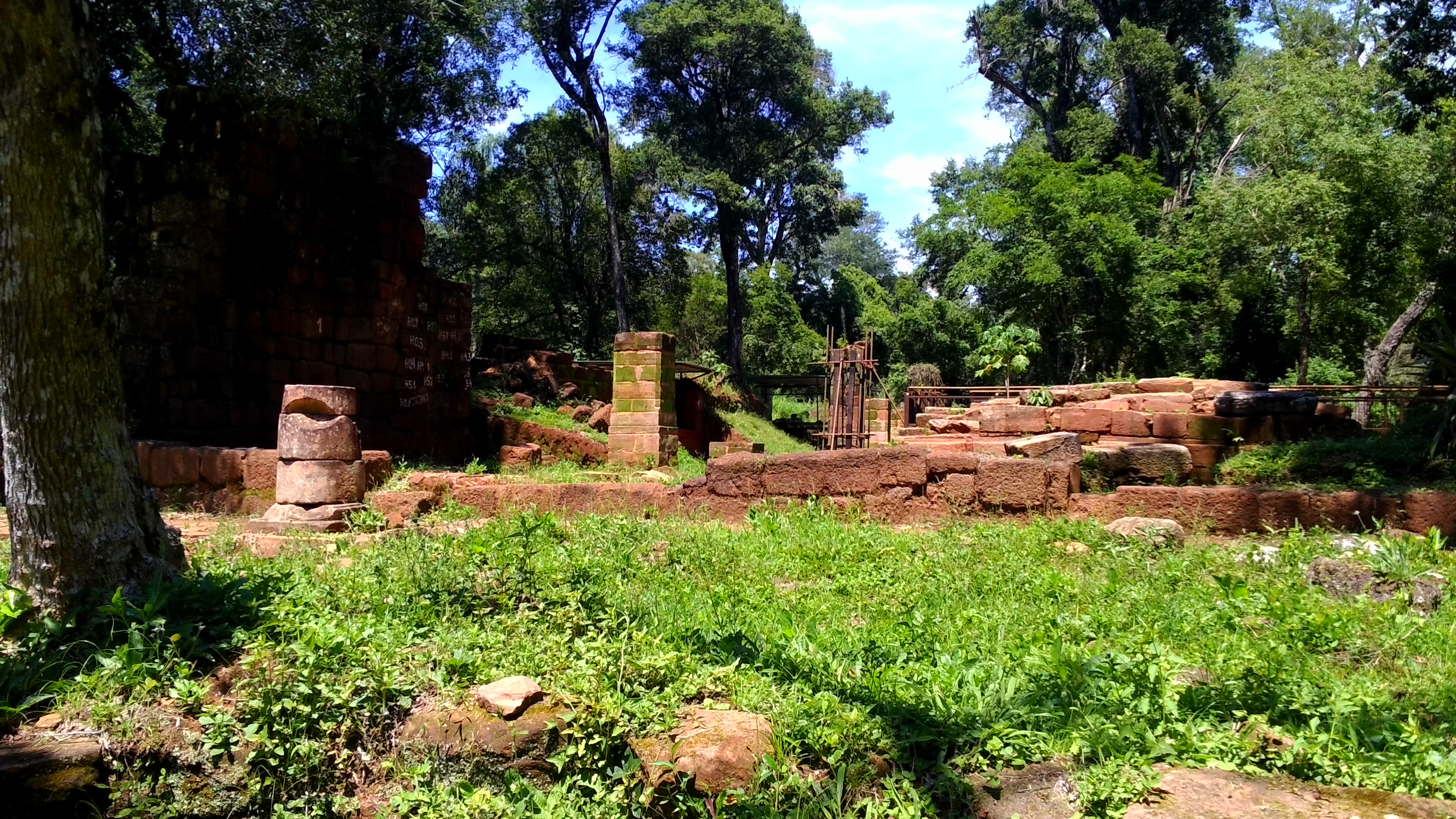

- Location within Argentina
- Location: Misiones Province, Argentina
- Part of: Jesuit Missions of the Guaranis: San Ignacio Mini, Santa Ana, Nuestra Señora de Loreto and Santa Maria Mayor (Argentina), Ruins of Sao Miguel das Missoes (Brazil)
- Criteria: Cultural: (iv)
- Reference: 275bis-004
- Inscription: 1983 (7th Session)
- Extensions: 1984
- Coordinates: 27°19′58″S 55°31′02″W

Reducción de Nuestra Señora de Loreto (Reduction of Our Lady of Laurel), founded in 1610, was the first reductions established by the Jesuits in the Province of Paraguay in the Americas during the Spanish colonial period. The site is located in the Candelaria Department of Misiones Province, Argentina.

The Jesuits learned Indian languages and developed ways to write them using the Roman alphabet. They established a printing press at this mission, for which it became renowned. Not only did the Jesuits print works in Spanish and Latin (the language of the Catholic liturgy, Bible, and prayer book), but they translated the Bible and other Christian works into Indian languages, as well as printing dictionaries.

Father Antonio Garriga was a Spanish Jesuit attached to Nuestra Señora de Loreto beginning in the last years of the 17th century and extending well into the early 18th century. He was particularly known as a linguist and missionary to the Moro people; he worked in the region from 1696 and served as Superior of the Mission several times. His book, Practical Instruction to Order One’s Life According to Saintly Precepts (c.1713) was the second-oldest book printed at the mission. In 1760, a ship named after the reduction was built by a Filipino in Baja California.

Today, only the ruins of the Jesuit reduction are left at the site. In 1984, it was one of four reducciones in Argentina (others were San Ignacio Mini, Nuestra Señora de Santa Ana, and Santa María la Mayor) and São Miguel das Missões in Brazil designated as World Heritage Sites by UNESCO. In 1993 UNESCO added two missions of the Province of Paraguay, located in present-day Paraguay, as World Heritage Sites.

Vegetation has grown over and contributed to deterioration of the ruins, which are not as well-preserved as those of San Ignacio Miní, also in Misiones.

== See also ==
- List of Jesuit sites
