= Reducción de Santa María la Mayor, Argentina =

Santa María la Mayor
UNESCO World Heritage Site
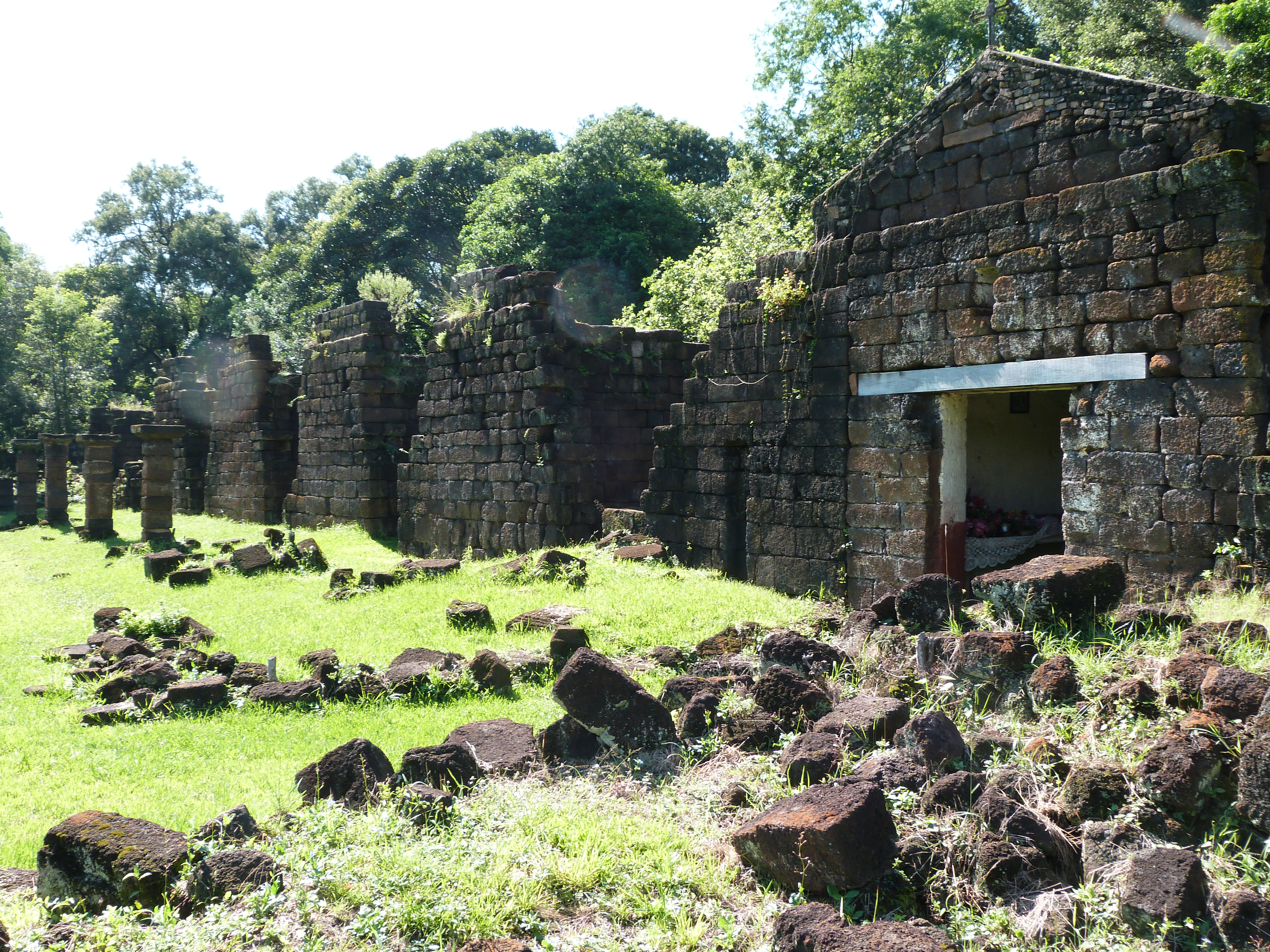

- Location within Argentina
- Location: Misiones Province, Argentina
- Part of: Jesuit Missions of the Guaranis: San Ignacio Mini, Santa Ana, Nuestra Señora de Loreto and Santa Maria Mayor (Argentina), Ruins of Sao Miguel das Missoes (Brazil)
- Criteria: Cultural: (iv)
- Reference: 275bis-005
- Inscription: 1983 (7th Session)
- Extensions: 1984
- Coordinates: 27°53′16″S 55°20′40″W

Reducción de Santa María la Mayor (Reduction of Holy Maria Major), located in the Santa María Department of the Misiones Province, Argentina, was one of the missions or reductions founded in the 17th century by the Jesuits in the Americas during the Spanish colonial period. In 1984 it was one of four reduction sites in Argentina designated as World Heritage Sites by UNESCO.

== Jesuit Reductions ==
The Jesuit reduction of Santa María la Mayor was founded in 1626, and by 1744 it held a population of 993. It was abandoned after the Jesuits were expelled from the Spanish colonies in 1767 after suppression of the order by the Spanish and Portuguese governments.

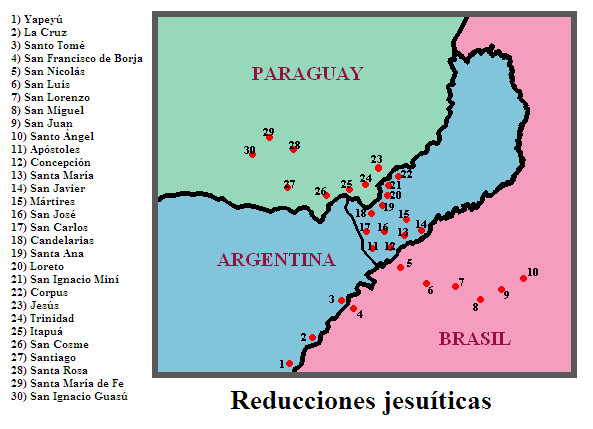
Location of the most important reductions, with present political divisions.

== World Heritage Site ==
In 1984 the ruins of the reduction were declared a World Heritage Site by UNESCO, together with three other reductions in the area of Argentina and one in Brazil, all formerly part of the Province of Paraguay during the colonial era. The ruins have been grown over by vegetation. They are not as well preserved as those of San Ignacio Miní, also in Misiones.

== See also ==
- Jesuit Reductions
- List of Jesuit sites
