= Ruins of São Miguel das Missões =

Historic Jesuit reduction in Rio Grande do Sul, Brazil

UNESCO World Heritage Site
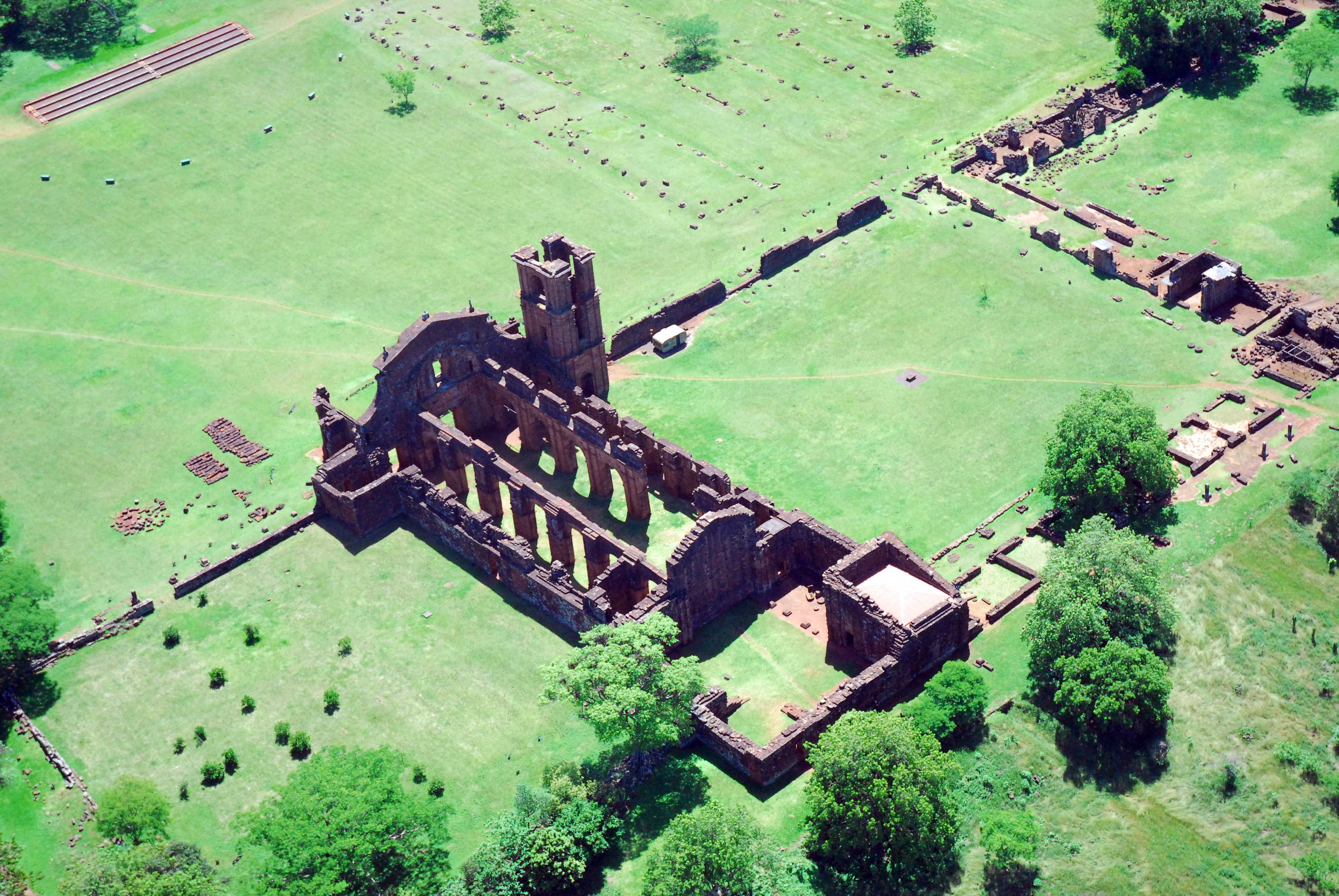

- Location within Brazil
- Location: São Miguel das Missões, Rio Grande do Sul, Brazil
- Part of: Jesuit Missions of the Guaranis: San Ignacio Mini, Santa Ana, Nuestra Señora de Loreto and Santa Maria Mayor (Argentina), Ruins of Sao Miguel das Missoes (Brazil)
- Criteria: Cultural: (iv)
- Reference: 275bis-001
- Inscription: 1983 (7th Session)
- Extensions: 1984
- Coordinates: 28°32′52″S 54°33′20″W

The Ruins of São Miguel das Missões (pronounced [ˈsɐ̃w miˈɡɛw dɐz miˈsõjs]; Portuguese for 'St. Michael of the Missions'), also known as São Miguel Arcanjo, and by its former Spanish name Misión de San Miguel Arcángel, is a UNESCO World Heritage Site located in the municipality of São Miguel das Missões, in the state of Rio Grande do Sul, southern Brazil.

The São Miguel Jesuit mission was part of a vast programme of evangelisation by the Jesuits, who extended their efforts eastwards and westwards, leaving a strong mark on many countries around the world, which can still be seen today. The Jesuit settlement was established at a time when the territory was under Spanish rule and was the most notable of the Seven Towns, which have become an important part of the history of Rio Grande do Sul and Brazil and a source of rich traditions. Built in 1687 according to an advanced organisational plan for its location and time, a flourishing civilisation arose there, economically prosperous and prolific in cultural and artistic expressions, where European and indigenous elements were mixed, always, however, with a strong European and Christian orientation. But as soon as it reached its apogee, with the construction of its church between 1735 and 1750, its decline began. Caught up in the political and territorial disputes between Portugal and Spain and the controversies surrounding Jesuit activity, it was one of the centres of the Guaraní War and was burned down and depopulated in 1756. Restored and partially repopulated, it survived a few more years under a new administration after the Jesuits were expelled, and their Order suppressed, but it was already in decline. At the beginning of the 19th century it was looted, and its last inhabitants dispersed, making its ruin inexorable and falling into complete abandonment.

The restoration of the structures began in 1925, and since then the site has been increasingly valued, undergoing several restoration interventions and being the subject of several projects to promote its material and immaterial legacy. Its church has become one of the best-known images in Rio Grande do Sul, and the complex is a major tourist attraction. It is also the main centre of the city where it is located, which was formed as a result of its construction and is closely linked to it on many levels. Indigenous Guaraní communities in the surrounding area hold the site as sacred and as part of their collective memory and identity.

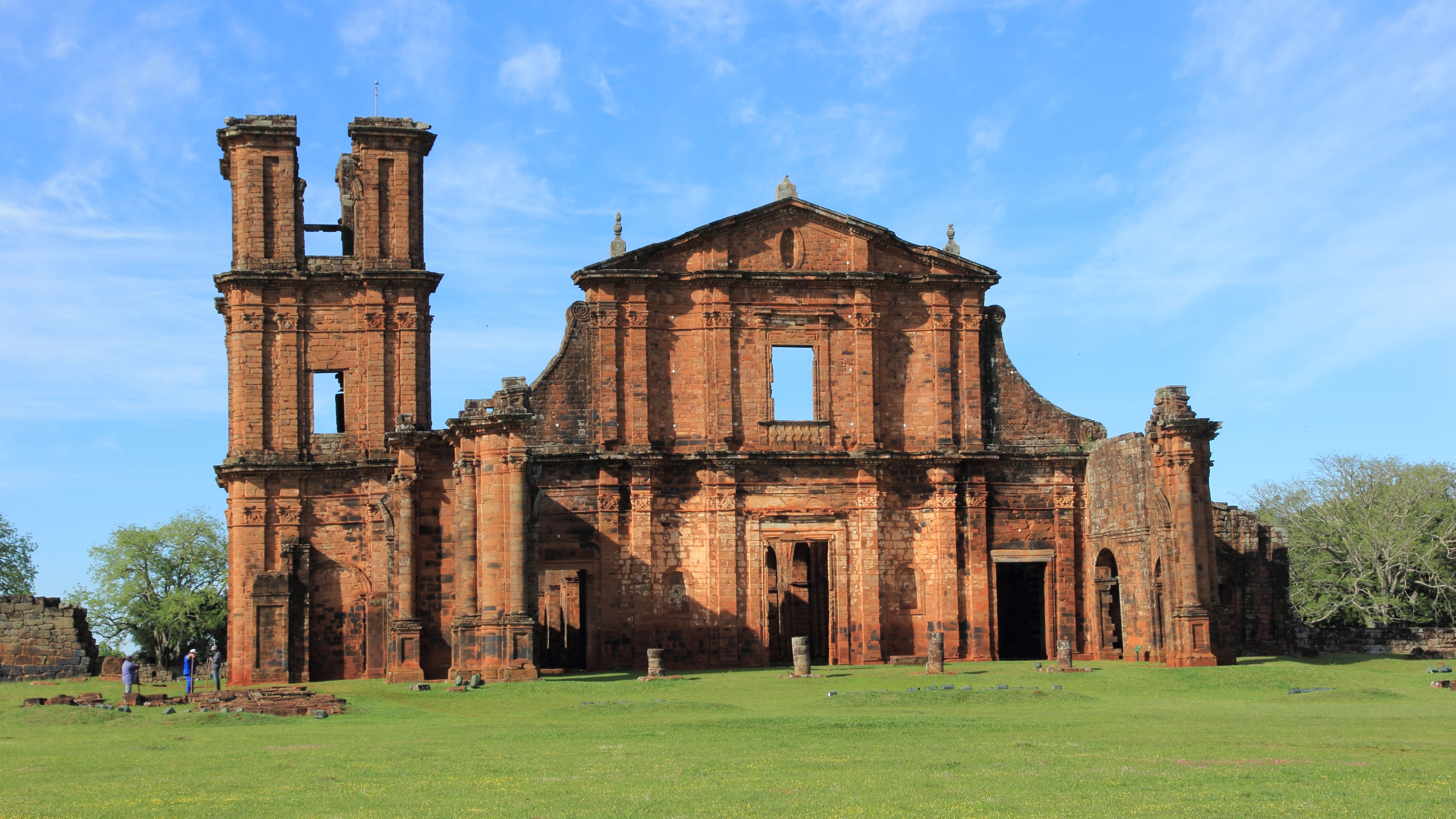
Ruins of the old temple.

Because of its important historical, architectural and cultural value, the site was listed by the National Institute of Historic and Artistic Heritage (IPHAN) in 1938, was declared a UNESCO World Heritage Site in 1983, along with the ruins of San Ignacio Miní, Nuestra Señora de Santa Ana, Nuestra Señora de Loreto and Santa María La Mayor, located in Argentinian territory, and in 2015 was granted Brazilian Cultural Heritage status by IPHAN for its associations with Guaraní history and spirituality.

== History ==
=== Origins ===
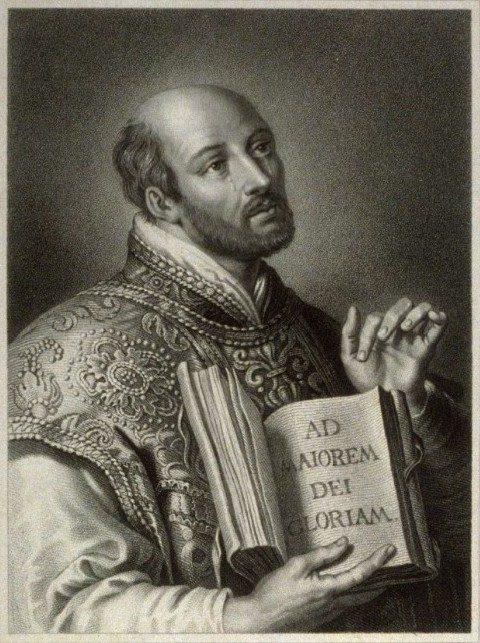
St Ignatius of Loyola, by William Holl the Younger.

The São Miguel do Arcanjo mission was one of the outcomes of the Christian programme of evangelisation. Ever since the ministry of Jesus, when he commanded his apostles to go out preaching, it has been part of Christianity to seek the conversion of people to their faith. Over the centuries, there have been many missionaries from different religious orders, and even independent ones, dedicated to this activity.

At the end of the Renaissance, in 1539, St Ignatius of Loyola founded the Jesuit Order, which soon proved to be the most dynamic, versatile and successful religious organisation engaged in the missionary campaign. Their success was due to a strict discipline, a solid cultural and pedagogical training of a broad scope, and an adaptability to the different local contexts that became notorious, enabling them to use indigenous customs to soften the impact of conversion and make it easier and more appealing to non-Christians. In addition, their linguistic ability, persuasive rhetoric and innovative methods of indoctrination and teaching also made them famous. With all these resources, the Jesuits spread throughout the world, in particular to Asia and America, where they founded stable missions and converted masses of the population.

In the Americas, the missions were also known as reduções (reductions), a word that derives from the Latin reducere, meaning to lead or teach. There, the priests brought together numerous native peoples, teaching them Catholic doctrine and European customs, becoming largely autonomous communities, but ultimately dependent on the Monarch and the General of the Order. Missionary activity was also attempted in America by other religious orders, but none with such success in their aims and such posthumous fame as the Jesuits. However, due to several factors, missionary activity adopted somewhat different moulds in Spanish America compared to what happened in the domains of Portugal, whose success was far more limited.

=== The Seven Towns and the São Miguel Arcanjo Reduction ===
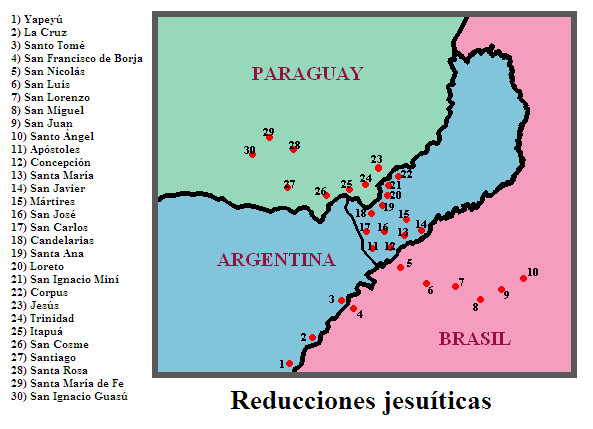
Location of the Seven Towns (pink area).

At the time when the São Miguel settlement was founded, subject to the Jesuit Province of Paraguay, the territory belonged to Spain, and its final collapse was due to the conflicts that this nation had with Portugal over possession of the region, and also to the intense defamatory campaign that the Jesuits suffered in the 18th century, which led to their deportation from both Iberian countries and ultimately to the (temporary) suppression of the Order, causing a generalised disruption of all its former missionary foundations. In the meantime, this mission was part of the group known as the Guaraní Reductions, since the majority of the natives belonged to this ethnic group. This was one of the most organised and flourishing of all the American missions, and became an ideal model for Jesuit reductions.

Within the large Guaraní ensemble, a particular group emerged. They were known as the Seven Towns of the Missions, which were formed as an offshoot of the eighteen Reductions of the Tape, founded from 1626 onwards on the eastern bank of the Uruguay River, in a region that is now part of Rio Grande do Sul, in Brazil. Among these was the early reduction of San Miguel Arcanjo, founded in 1632 by the priests Cristóvão de Mendoza and Pablo Benevidez.

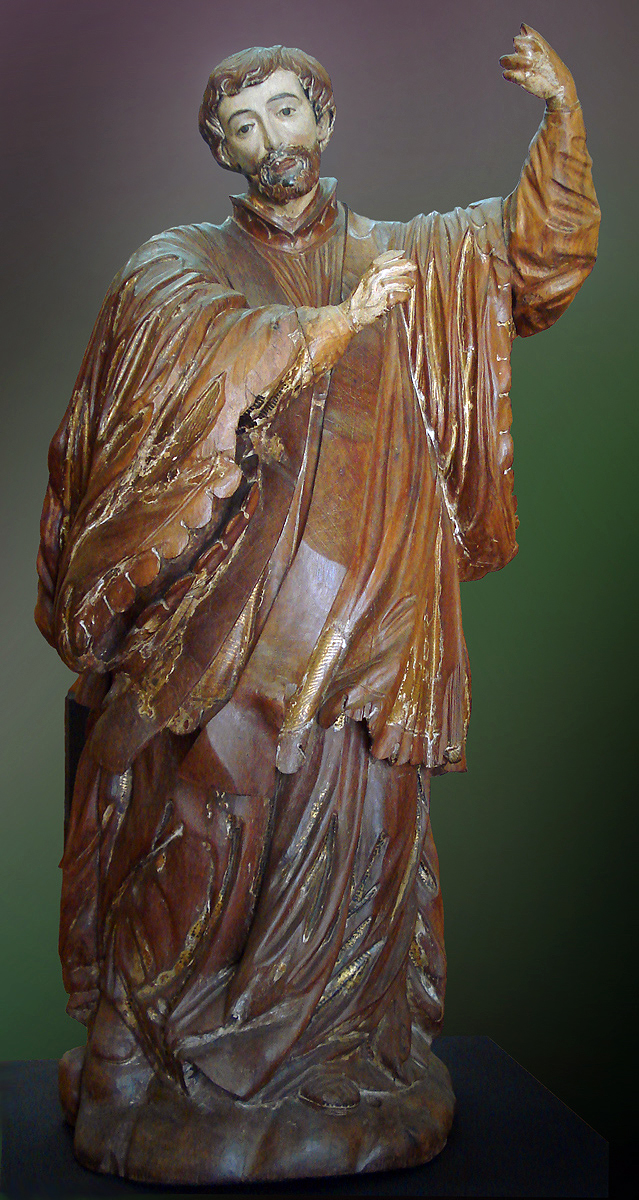
São Francisco Xavier, missionary art preserved in the Júlio de Castilhos Museum in Porto Alegre.

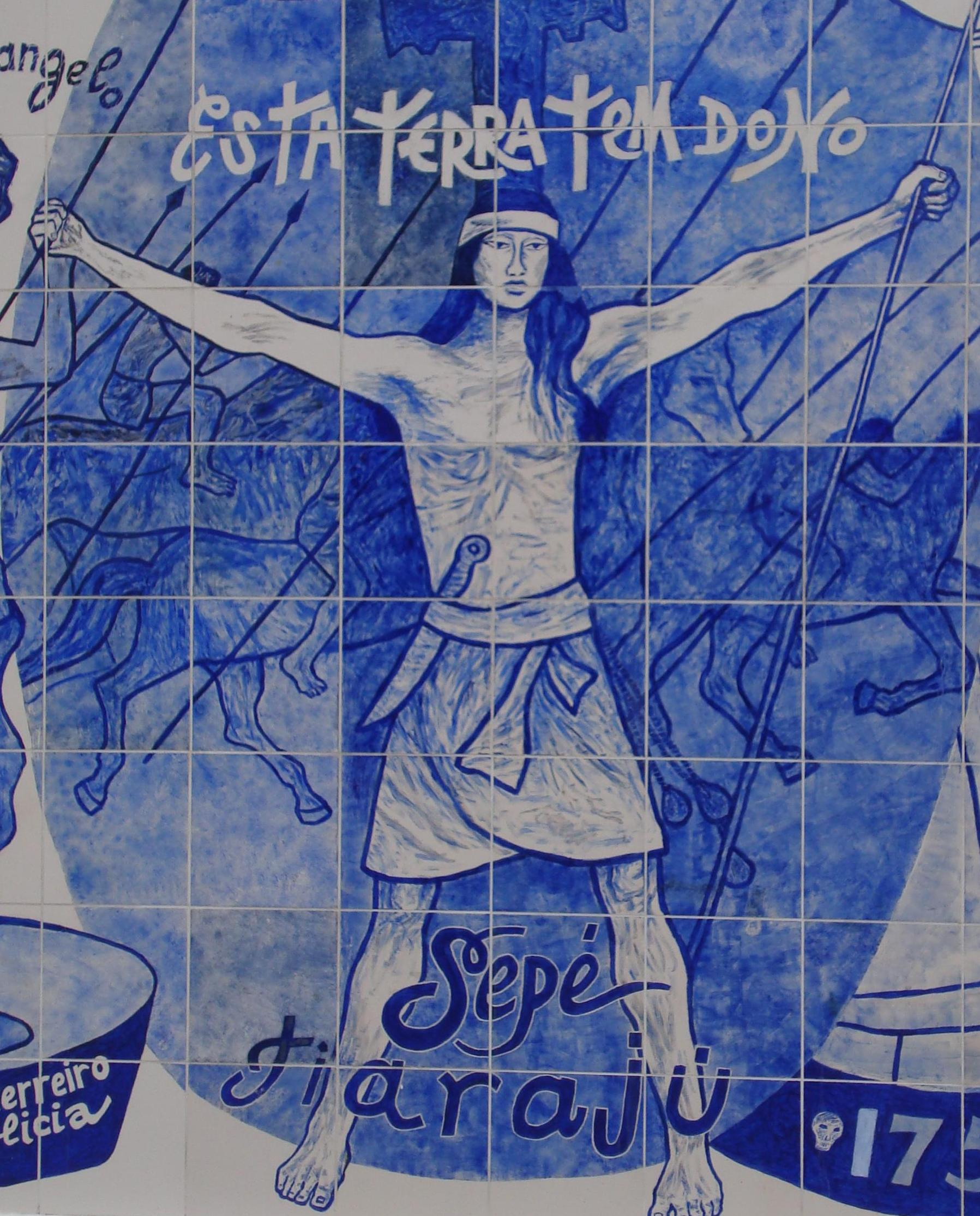
A picture of Sepé Tiaraju according to Danúbio Gonçalves, displayed at the Memorial of the Riograndense Epic in Porto Alegre, under the famous phrase he would have uttered: "This land has an owner!"

Fifteen of these settlements were attacked and devastated by the São Paulo bandeirantes a few years after they were founded, and in 1638 the others also faced the same fate. Fleeing the massacre and enslavement, the surviving natives and the priest directors moved to the west side of the Uruguay River. Those from San Miguel, destroyed in 1637, settled near Concepción in Paraguay, starting another settlement and building a church. This settlement was nearly destroyed by a tornado in 1642, but was soon rebuilt.

The bandeirantes had been temporarily stopped at the Battle of M'Bororé, fought in 1641, but with the end of the old Iberian Union at the same time, which had placed the kingdoms of Portugal and Spain under the same crown, political changes caused the foundation of new reductions to go into recess. The initiative was revived in 1682, when seven new settlements, the Seven Towns, were founded, some on the ruins of previous foundations, but São Miguel was re-established in 1687, apparently in a new location. São Miguel became the most important and populous of the Seven Towns. By 1690 the priests' convent and one hundred dwellings were already well under construction, and the town already had a population of over four thousand people. At its peak, it reached almost seven thousand. By 1697, the population had grown so much that the reduction had to be dismembered, with some of its inhabitants moving to a new colony, created nearby under the direction of Father Anton Sepp, which would later be known as the St John the Baptist reduction. In 1700, it already had a church, but plans were already underway to build a larger one.

While the first foundation had essentially evangelising objectives, the new political context led to a change in the mission's orientation when it was re-established. It was now in Spain's interest for the villages to function not only as centres for spreading Christianity and acculturating the indigenous people, but also as border guards, at a time when Portugal was advancing more and more into Spanish territories. In addition, due to the existence of a vast herd of cattle that lived freely in this area, the prospect of making economic use of this source of resources also became an important factor.

The Seven Towns developed a culture of their own, with notable economic and cultural development, including the production and consumption of works of art. Their churches, the most prominent structures in the settlements, were richly ornamented. São Miguel also operated an estância, which according to Thaís Rodrigues ‘became one of the largest Jesuit cattle breeding centres, considered the main source of economic wealth in the Platine region ever since’, and the surplus from its agricultural and manufacturing production supplied several other Spanish towns in the province of Paraguay.

The church, an important example of Baroque architecture, was built between 1735 and 1750. It was in the church that the theatrical and prolix Baroque spirit of the time reached its culmination and exerted its most profound seductive effect on the indigenous people, celebrating services surrounded by suggestive symbols and with a strong inclination towards festivity and drama, which were considered efficient means of indoctrination. Father Domenico Zipoli's description of the patron saint's feast is illustrative, saying that it was dressed in ‘the most lavish pomp’, as it was due to ‘the glorious archangel, who is the head of the angelic cohorts.’[25] The patron saint's feast was also described as ‘the most glorious’.

The construction of the church marked the apogee of the reduction and the beginning of its end, because in 1750 the Treaty of Madrid ordered that the Seven Towns be handed over to Portugal in exchange for the Colonia del Sacramento in Uruguay. The natives protested and the Guaraní War ensued - in which the native Sepé Tiaraju, who held the position of corregidor in São Miguel, stood out as a leader to the point of becoming a legend, a national hero and a popular saint - but at this point the Jesuits could do little for them, as the Order was also under heavy attack in Europe, accused among other things of encouraging indigenous rebellion against civil power and trying to found an independent empire in the Americas. The natives lost the war, and in 1756 San Miguel was occupied without resistance, as it had been abandoned, but the conquistadors found the priests' house and church in flames. The Jesuits were eventually expelled from America in 1768, and in 1773 the Order was dissolved by Pope Clement XIV, putting an end to their missionary endeavours.

=== Decay ===
The remnants of the settlements were taken over by a secular government aided by religious from other orders. Some survived a little longer, including São Miguel, but their former splendour was never restored. The fire at São Miguel church in 1756 didn't destroy the entire building, and seems to have been limited to the sacristy, so much so that reports from visitors shortly after the Guaraní War still point to the existence of its internal decoration.

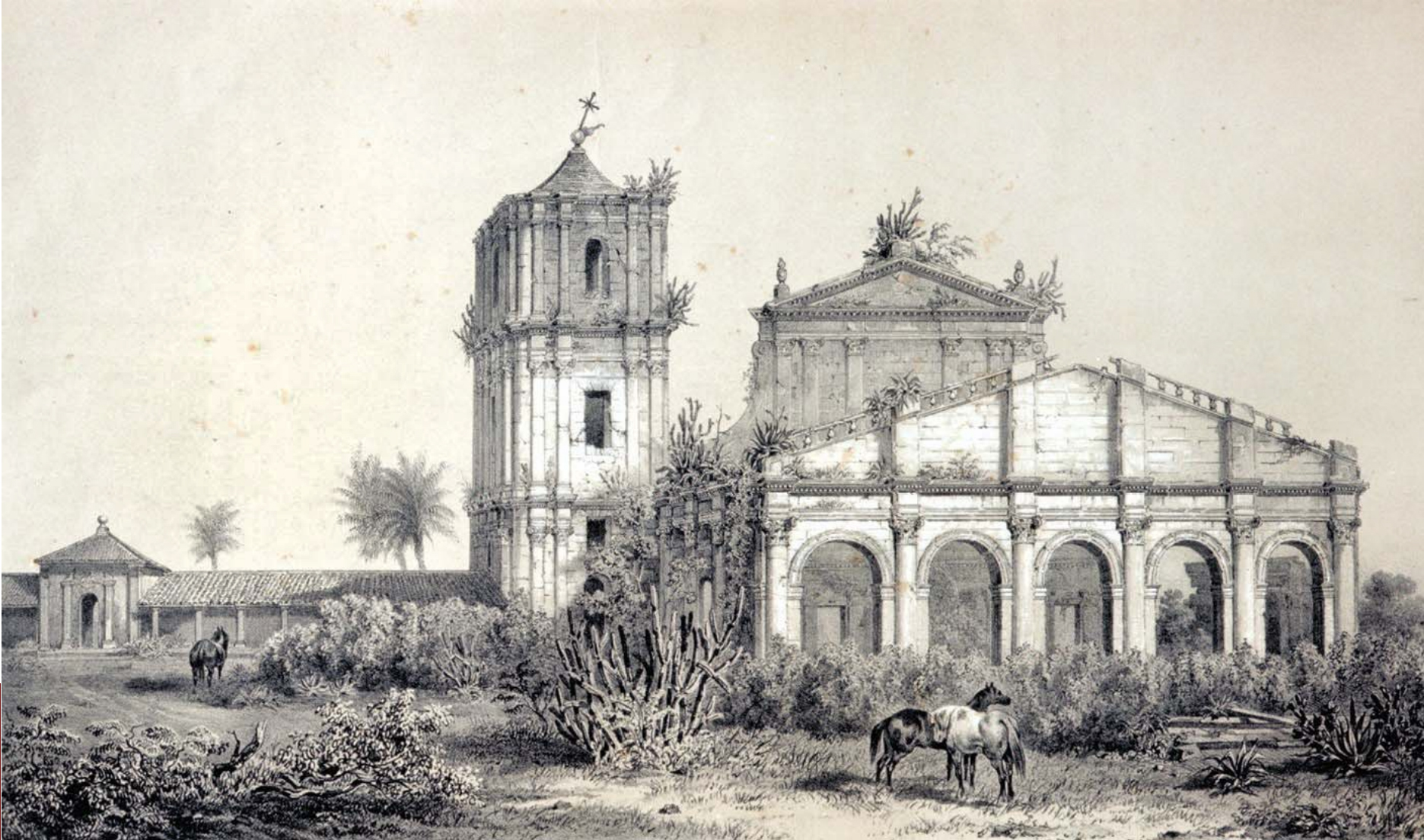
Ruins of São Miguel church in 1846, after the town disintegrated.

The new administrators repopulated the place and carried out several restoration works in the following years, but they were rather superficial, and from 1762 to 1768 its dome, previously made of wood, was rebuilt with bricks and lime. However, in 1789, lightning struck the church, causing it to burn down again. In 1801, with a new war between the Iberian powers, the Portuguese invaded the area and conquered it once and for all. In 1828, the rich churches of the Seven Towns were eventually sacked by Fructuoso Rivera, who took 60 cartloads of precious objects and works of sacred art, causing the final dispersal of the surviving indigenous people.

A long period of abandonment followed and scrubland covered the site. The roof was ruined and the galilee collapsed in 1886, struck by another bolt of lightning, many stones were removed to be used as building material, and the walls began to be chipped away by hunters of a legendary ‘treasure of the Jesuits’.

== Recovery and conservation ==
After listing the area as a ‘Historic Site’ in 1922, the State Government limited the protected area from 1925 to 1927 and carried out an initial stabilisation of the ruins, but the official interest at that time was focused solely on the church, disregarding the urban plan of the reduction. It was only when IPHAN began its work that the integrity of the complex was restored, and it was among the first listings made by the institution, which was founded in 1937. Lúcio Costa was responsible for analysing the site and qualifying it as suitable for listing, which took place in 1938. In the same year, work began to clean and consolidate the ruins, which had been taken over by the vegetation.

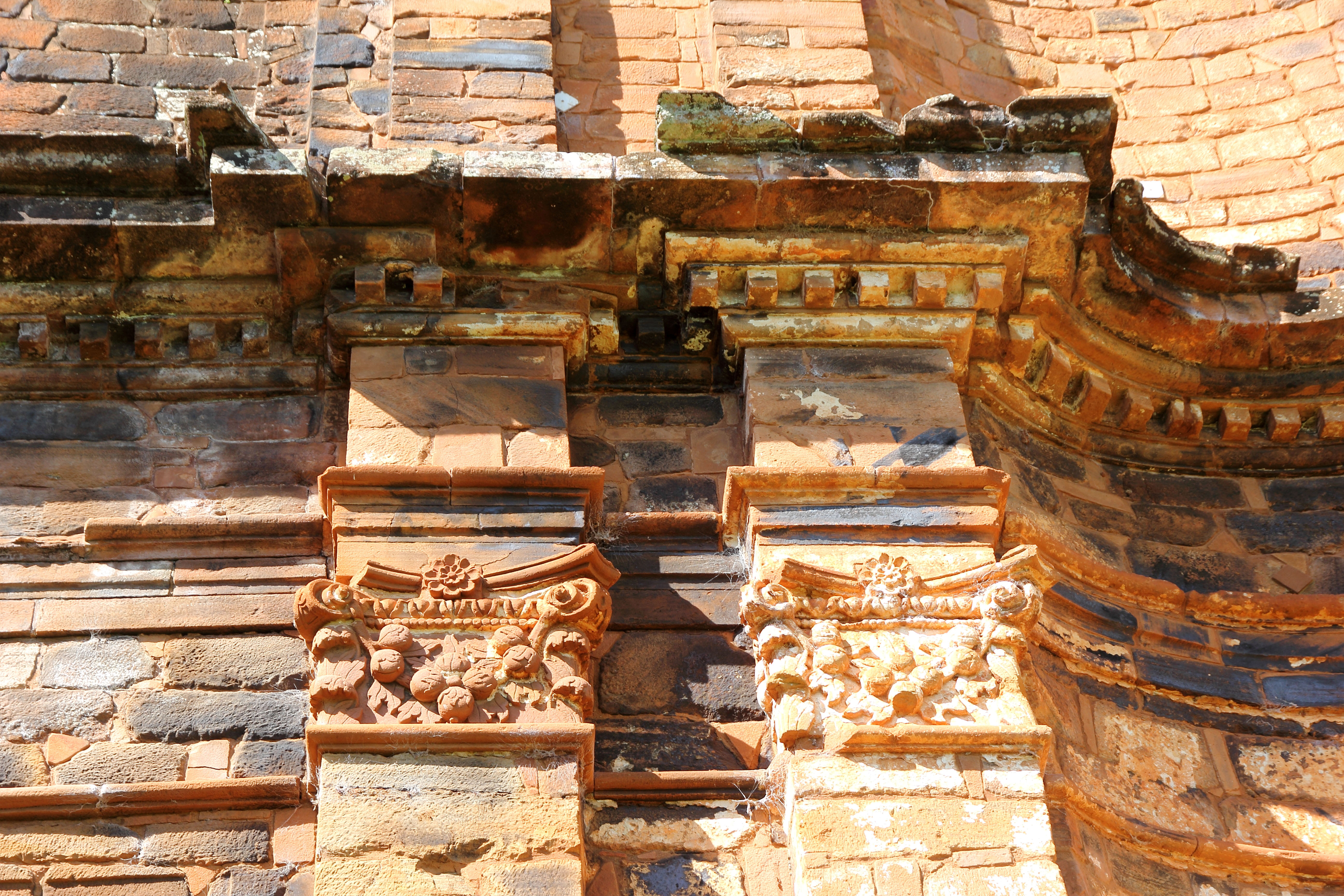
Detail of the capitals on the façade.

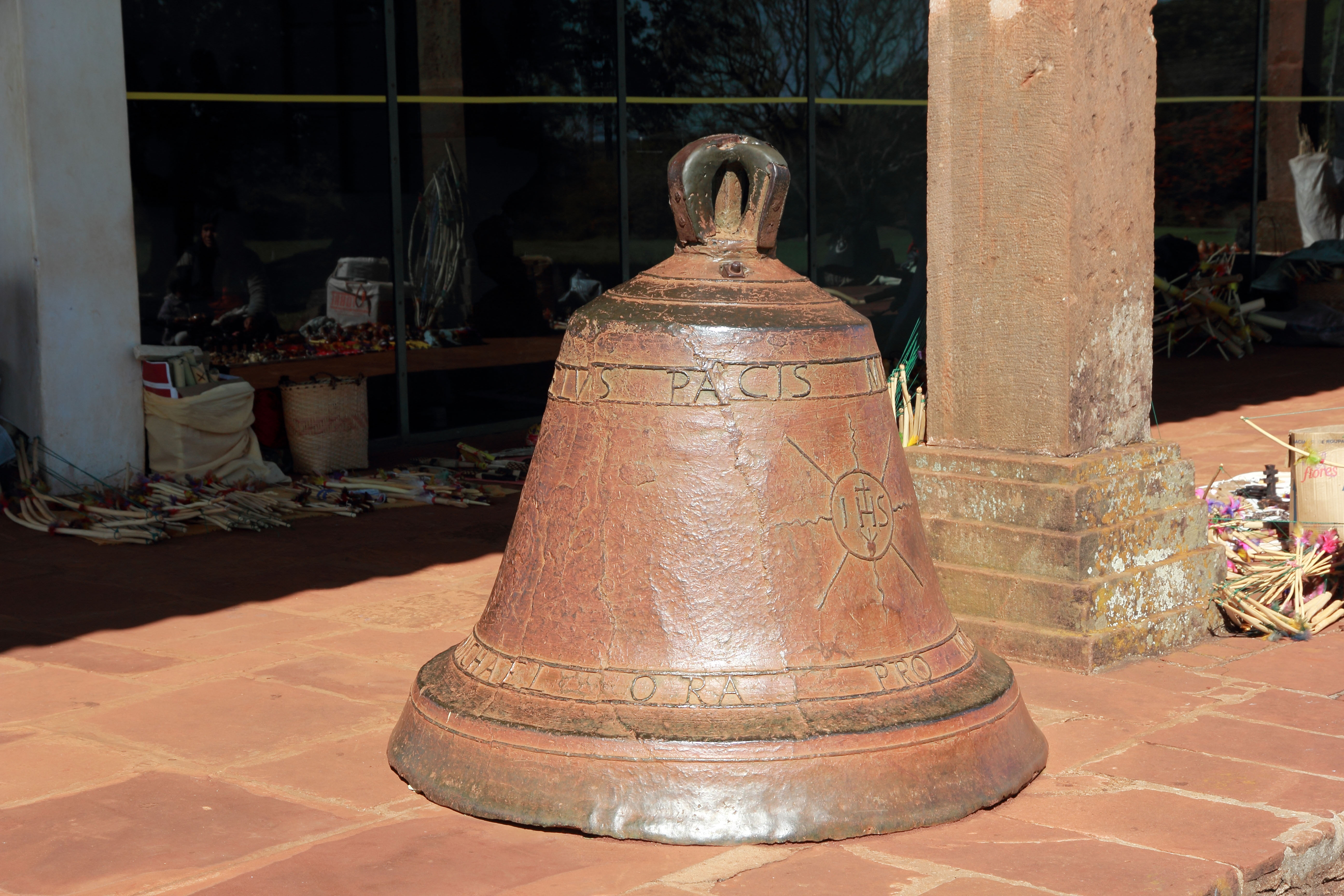
One of the old church bells.

At the same time, a museum was built next to it, the Missions Museum, which gathered the movable remnants of the missionary legacy in the region, and today has the largest collection of missionary statuary in Brazil, as well as other related objects, such as fragments of reliefs, baptismal fonts and one of the great church bells. The museum was designed by Lúcio Costa himself, inspired by the Spanish buildings of the time and the dwellings for the Indians built in the town.

Keeping up the research and protection work, IPHAN ordered changes to the urban plan for the town of São Miguel das Missões, which was starting to expand over the archaeological site. Shortly afterwards, the boundaries of the protected area were extended and in 1948 the square was cleared of rubble and vegetation. From 1954 to 1958 new work was done to reinforce the walls, and buryings in the old cemetery were banned in 1960. In the 1970s a project began to strengthen the structures of the school, workshops and infirmary, and once again the protected area was expanded. In 1978, an orderly urban occupation plan was proposed for the growing settlement, creating a buffer area in the surroundings, which significantly curbed the invasion of the space, but when the village of São Miguel was emancipated in 1988, one of the first acts of the new council was to revoke the previous plan, allowing several fractions of the preserved territory to be sold and occupied. In 1994, in agreement between IPHAN, the local government and representatives of civil society, a plan was drawn up to clear the invaded areas, which was implemented the following year. At the same time, the protected land around the fountain was extended, forcing further changes to the Masterplan. The eviction was completed in 2008. According to Stello,

"The process of occupation and urban expansion of São Miguel das Missões was strongly influenced by the presence, initially, of the imposing ruin of the Church of São Miguel, and more recently, the archaeological site of São Miguel Arcanjo and other heritage elements. Today, the residents of São Miguel already realise that the site is loaded with different meanings, understand the importance of that cultural legacy and are incorporating it into their city planning".

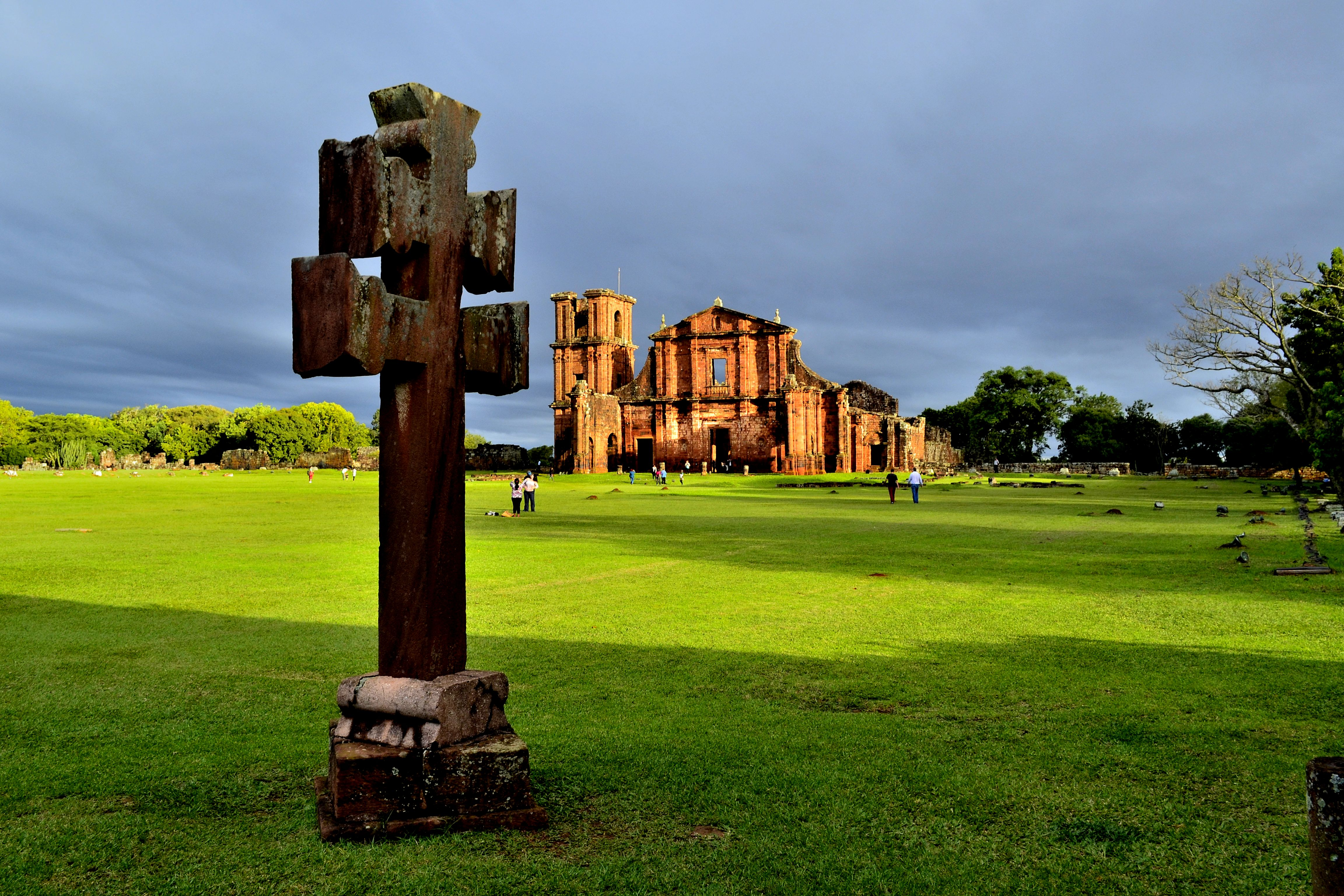
The large cross in the square of the old mission.

Despite having achieved good overall results, the restoration project initiated by Lúcio Costa would be questionable today. The tower's stability was considered poor from the outset, and it was decided to dismantle and rebuild it in the 1930s, but in the process there was some alteration to its characteristics, as the stones were not put back in their exact original position. The large missionary cross next to the Museum of the Missions is an arbitrary addition. It wasn't initially part of the complex, but was brought from a cemetery in Santo Ângelo under the guidance of Lúcio Costa, who wanted to emphasise the religious significance of the place. The site underwent other subsequent interventions according to a methodology that would be unacceptable today, although it was seen as appropriate at the time. In the analysis of Ana Meira, former IPHAN superintendent in Rio Grande do Sul,

"In 1948, work was carried out to clean up the square, carrying on with the construction of the modernist image planned for the site, which had begun with the building of the museum. [...] There was another type of alteration identified by Odair José de Almeida and Júlio Curtis, around the same time, concerning the negative effects of some technical solutions. The former warned that the joint entrenchments were standardising the mortars of the different periods, which helped tell the story of the construction. The second criticised the threat of ‘mummification’ due to the use of binders and metal seams. These criticisms, however, recognised the legitimacy of the solutions that were possible at the time. These aspects were subsequently mitigated by the use of natural materials, such as lime in mortars. However, there was no initiative to preserve samples of the original mortars, mapping them in order to better interpret the construction technique used, as well as the chronological evolution of the buildings of the ancient people. [...]

"The interventions sought to preserve the document, preserving the remnants without reconstructing it. However, the core of the document was altered. As for the ‘rubble’ that was removed from the nave and sacristy in the 1930s-1960s, it is known that it actually included precious archaeological references. The amount of fallen material inside the old church, covered by vegetation, was enormous and raised the ground level to halfway up the walls. The romantic character of the ruins encouraged a strong link with the past. [...] The masonry began to consolidate as the cracks were fixed, and the ground levels began to drop as a result of the cleaning carried out on countless wheelbarrow journeys, the contents of which ended up being dumped at the back of the church, burying the walls of the rear porch.

"An image designed by one of the greatest modern architects, who years later would win the competition to design Brasilia - now also a World Heritage Site - was built over the whole ruined complex. It was a project decision, an image project as a representation of the modern. An example of a domesticated monument. [...] The ruin rested in a green tray, but it didn't lose its majesty or its symbolic image of an extraordinary human experience".

== Site characteristics ==
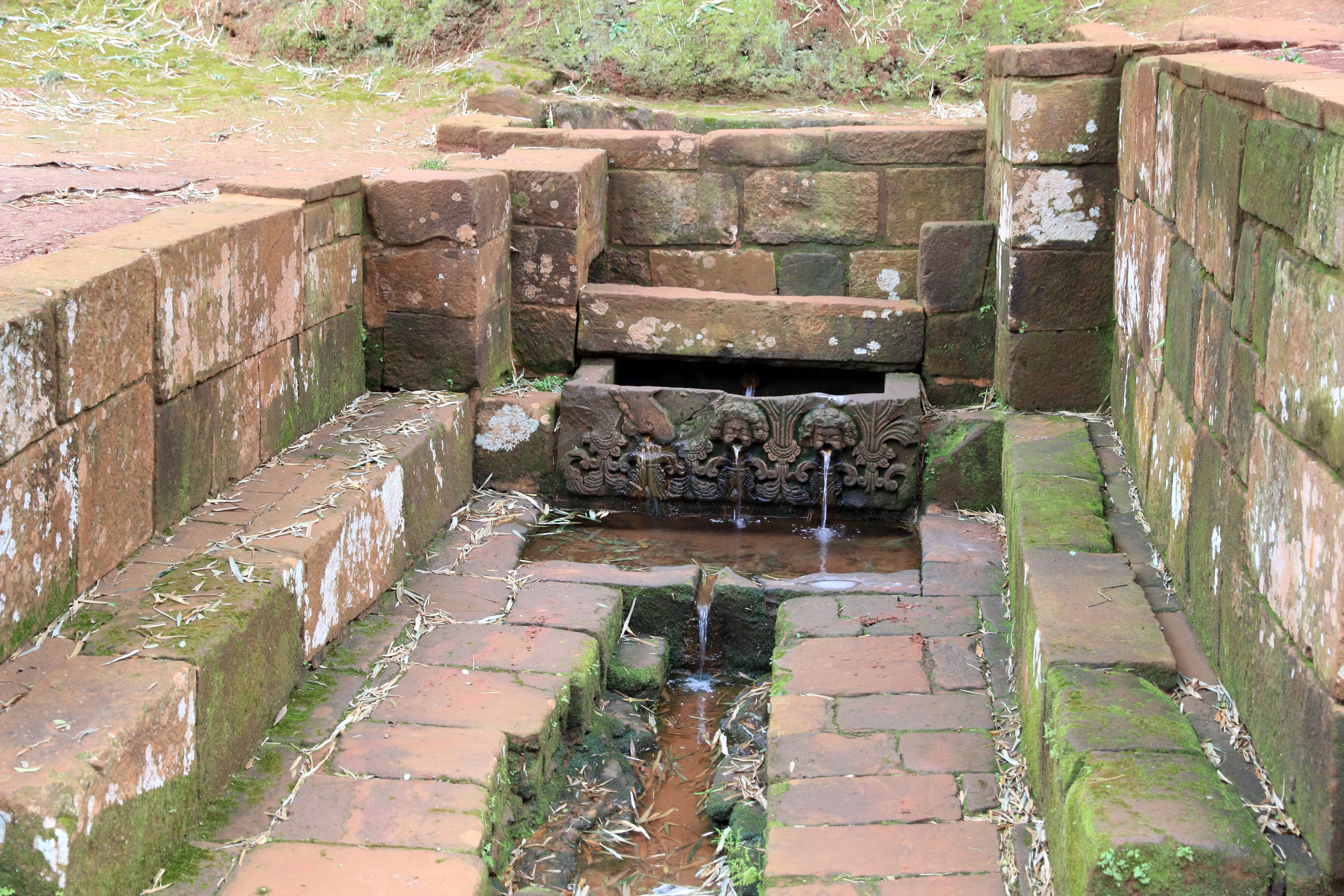
Fountain remnants.

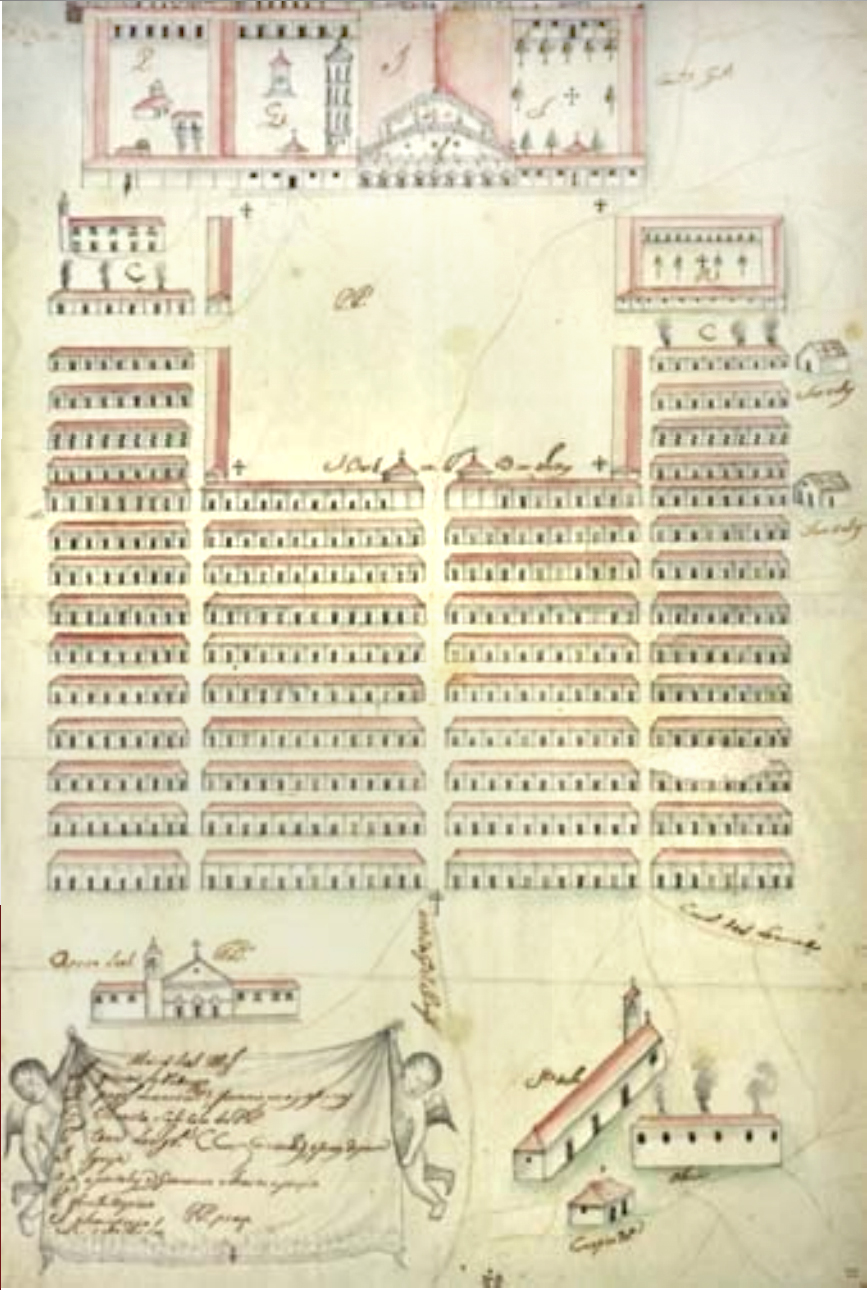
Blueprint of the São Miguel Arcanjo site, 1756.

The archaeological site of São Miguel is part of the Missões National Historical Park, which also includes the ruins of São Lourenço Mártir Archaeological Site, in São Luiz Gonzaga, São Nicolau, in São Nicolau, and São João Batista, in Entre-Ijuís, all listed by IPHAN.

The site covers 38 hectares (94 acres), and from the large original complex a good part of the old church, the bell tower and sacristy, the foundations of the native habitations, some cornerstones of the workshop walls, the convent and other buildings, the square, the vegetable garden and a good collection of sacred objects, mainly devotional statues, whose exact original provenance, however, is uncertain, having been collected from all over the surrounding region. The excavations also found a complex underground water system built in sandstone, including emergent structures such as a fountain and paved circular tanks. This fountain, carved with relief mascarons, located a kilometre from the church, survived in good condition concealed by the accumulation of earth and vegetation. It was rediscovered by IPHAN in 1982 and restored in 1993. On the outskirts of the complex, traces of two votive chapels, bread ovens and senzalas survive. Some fragmentary stone columns, located apart, seem to be the remnants of the trunks where wrongdoers were chastised.

As shown on the blueprint on the right, drawn up in 1756 by a Portuguese officer, São Miguel had a highly organised urban structure, and although this blueprint does not match exactly the remains found, it is illustrative of the basic model of Jesuit missionary urbanisation, which was always planned according to a similar scheme. São Miguel had a large rectangular square, around which the native houses were built, basically on the north side; the church, a college/convent, cemetery, workshops and vegetable garden/ orchard on the south, plus warehouses and other outbuildings on the sides. All the structures had clay tile roofs. A wider avenue crossed the village from north to south, dividing it into symmetrical halves, and ended at the large esplanade in front of the church, emphasising its monumental character. The square was the main focus of the community, where its major ceremonies, meetings and celebrations took place, and where justice was enforced. The residences were large pavilions divided into modules, surrounded by a covered veranda. Writings by Father Sepp, the town's founder, express his concern for order, clarity and regularity in structuring its layout, seeking to ‘escape the stupidity that is easily committed in the overly hasty construction of towns and cities’, following a classicist and idealising trend whose principles were expressed in the Law of the Indies and the Royal Ordinances, which regulated the form of Spanish colonisation of America.

The church ruins are the most impressive and intact remains of the old reduction. Its design is usually attributed to the Jesuit Giovanni Battista Primoli, but Francisco de Ribera has also been considered, at least as a collaborator, and the galilee must have been the work of José Grimau. It was designed in the Baroque style and built from 1735 using sandstone. It may have been started in 1720, as Lúcio Costa believed, based on an ambiguous reference in a letter from the time, and it underwent several modifications over time. Primoli left the work well advanced in 1744, when he retired to Paraguay, leaving only the carpentry and the roof to be finished in 1750.

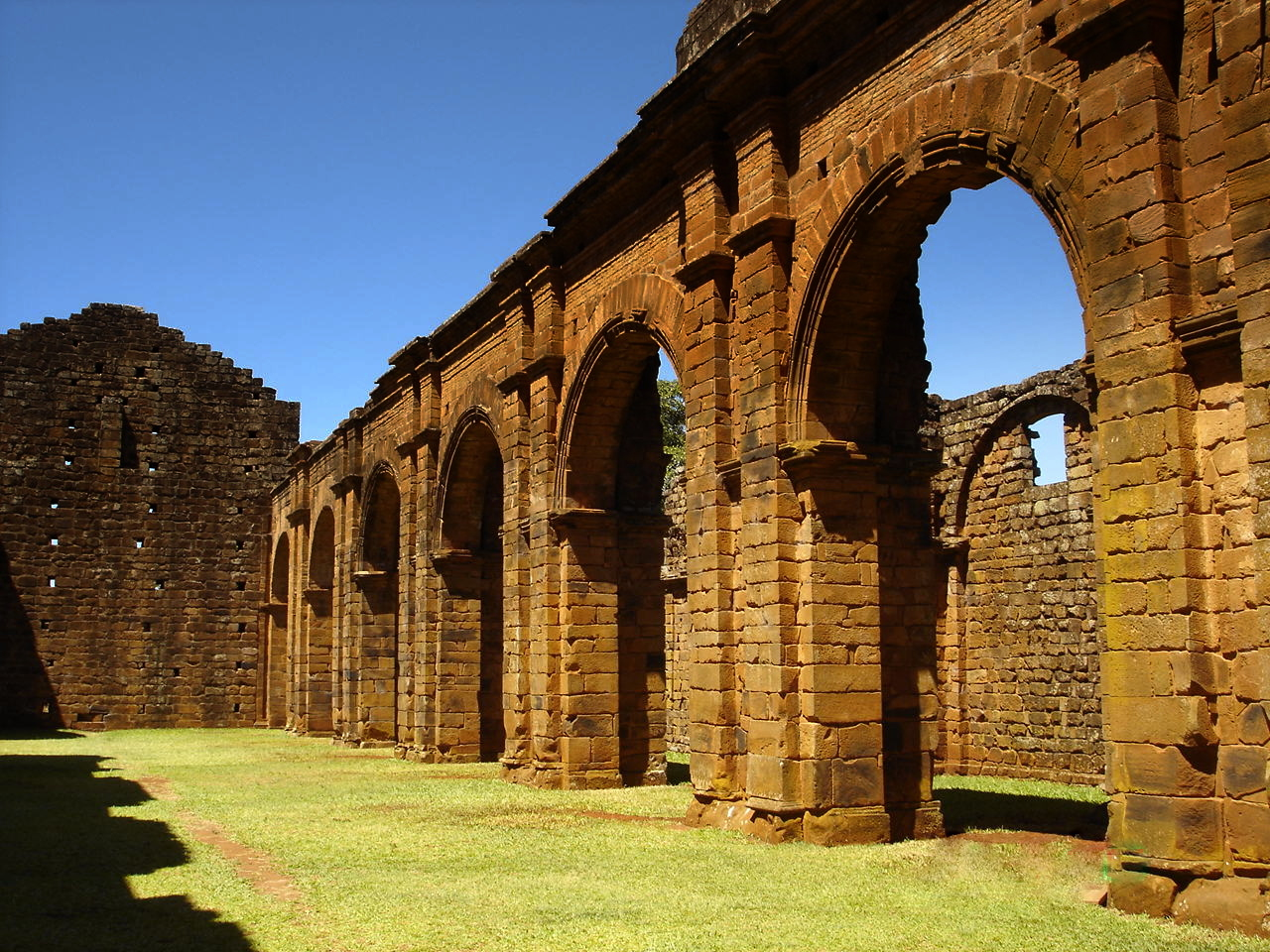
An inside view of the church's old centre nave.

The church was built on a stylobate with six wide steps. The façade was preceded by a large galilee with seven round arches alternated with semicircular pilasters in white and red stone, slightly raised to compensate for the optical distortion, and with composite capitals, which supported a lowered triangular pediment and gave access to three rectangular doors, the central one being the largest. Inside the galilee, on the right, there was a gilded carved altar and a glazed ceramic basin that served as a baptistery. The cornice was carved with friezes in relief and six statues of apostles were placed on the pediment in line with the columns. The second level of the body of the temple could be seen from behind, with a central niche for a statue of St Michael, and above this block, a new triangular pediment, crowned by a cross. A massive square tower was built on the side, with an arch at the base and two upper levels, the last with an arched opening for six bells and finished with a tent-shaped spire roof, topped by an iron cross. The tower was 14 metres (46 ft) high and 8 metres (26 ft) wide. The galilee must have been added after the church was completed, as it just leans against the adjacent wall and has no moorings.

The church was originally painted white inside and out, using tabatinga, a whitish clay from the region. Its interior was divided into three naves, separated by stone arches, with a vaulted wooden ceiling with exposed beams. The transept was covered by a dome with a hipped roof. Its eleven altars, one in the chancel, four in the crossing and six in the side naves, were richly decorated with gilded and polychrome carvings, statuary and paintings. A monumental statue of the archangel Michael was enthroned on the high altar. The sumptuous appearance of the interior is conveyed by some literary descriptions. Viscount de São Leopoldo, who had taken part in the Guaraní War, left one of these accounts:

"In front of a large quadrangular square, into which nine streets lead, we could see the church, although it has stone and mud walls, but very thick and whitened with tabatinga [...] the church has three naves, three hundred and fifty spans long and one hundred and twenty wide, with five altars of gilded wood carving and excellent paintings. [...] The tower is also made of stone and has six bells".

Another visitor, the Spanish captain don Francisco Graell, described it like this:

"The church is very large, made entirely of sandstone, with three half-orange naves, very well painted and gilded, with a magnificent portico and beautiful architecture; the half-orange vaults are made of wood; the high altar is carved without gilding, missing the last part: on the crossing there are three sculpted altars, two in Italian style, also gilded".

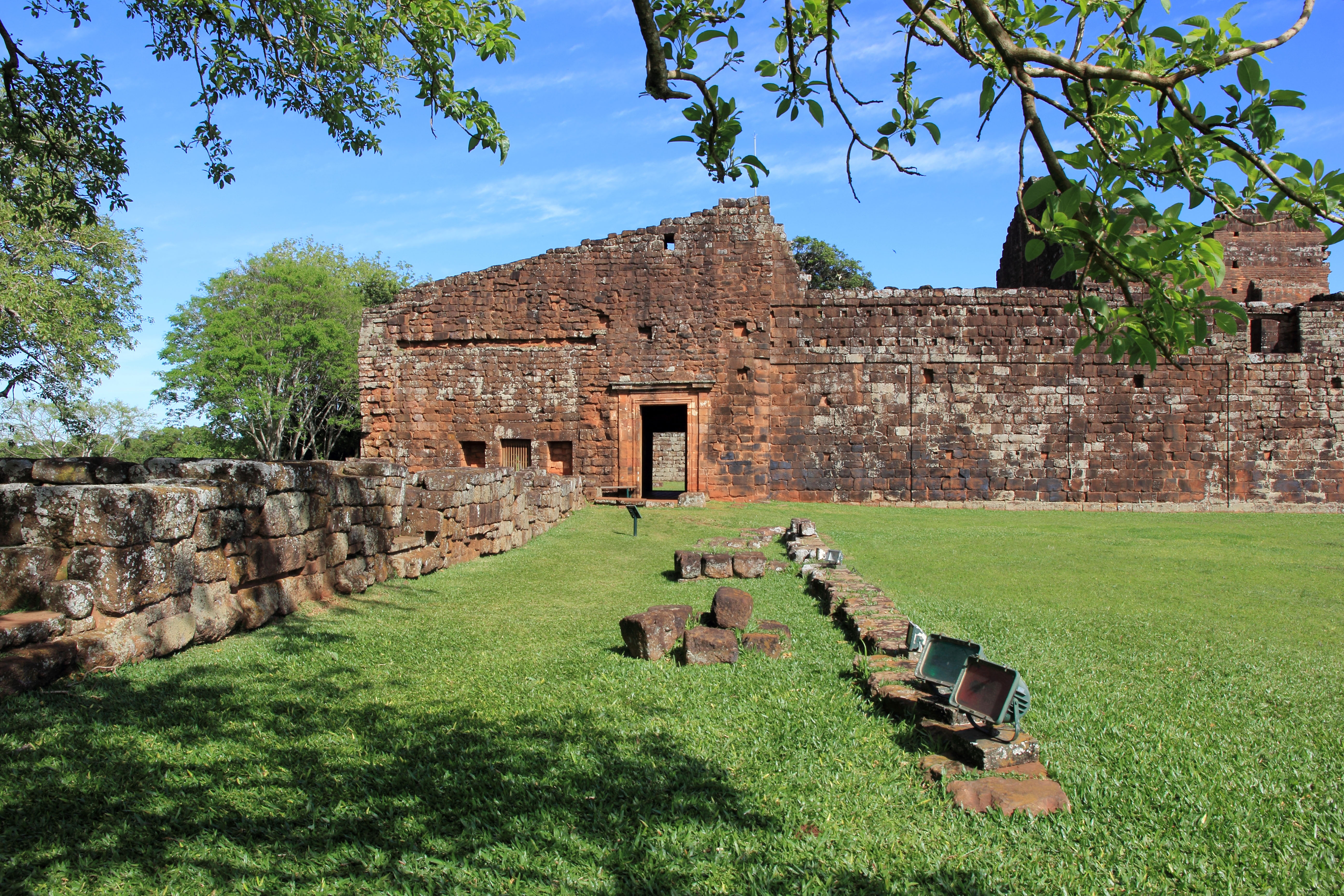
East wall of the church and cloister courtyard.

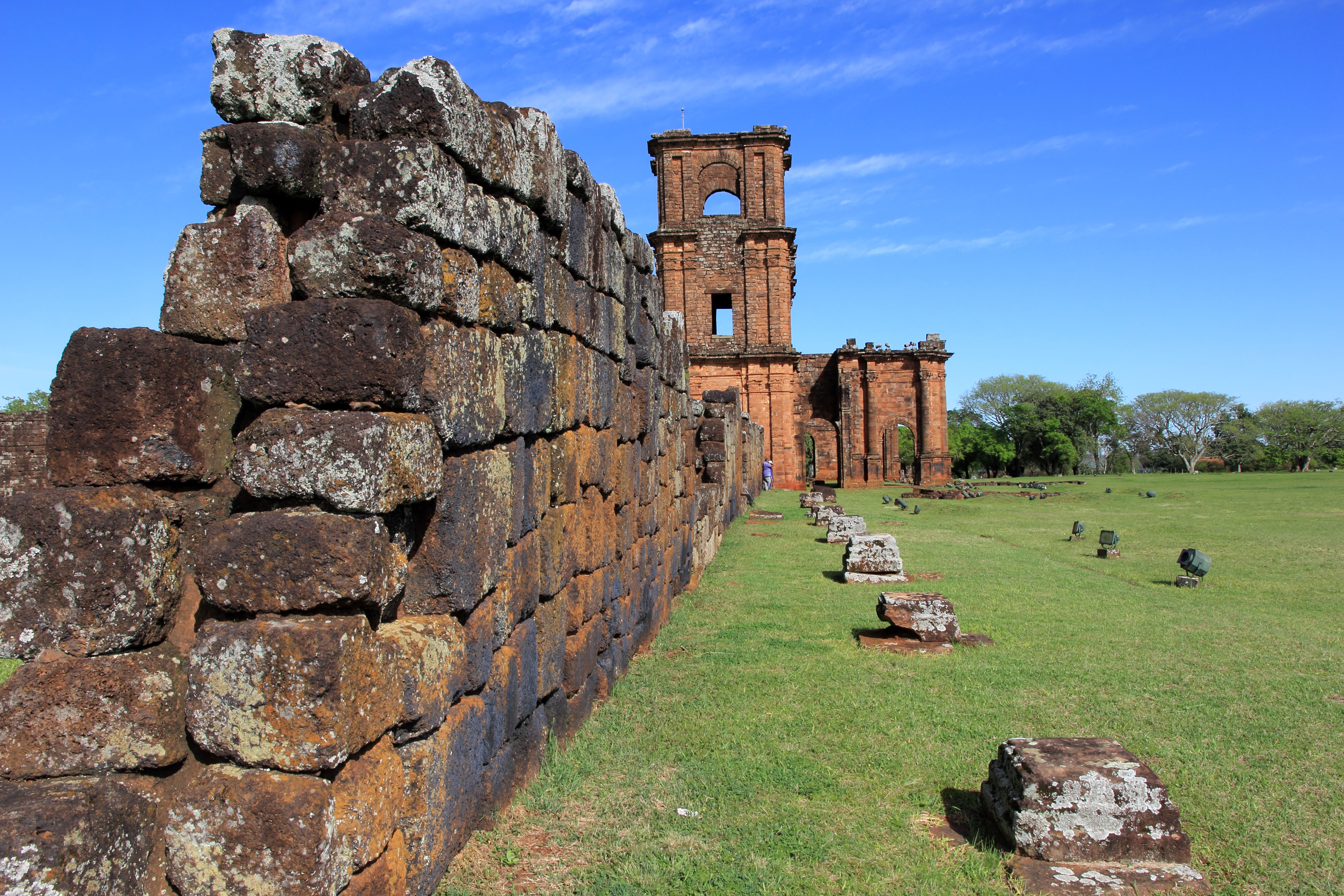
Remnants of the north wall of the workshops.

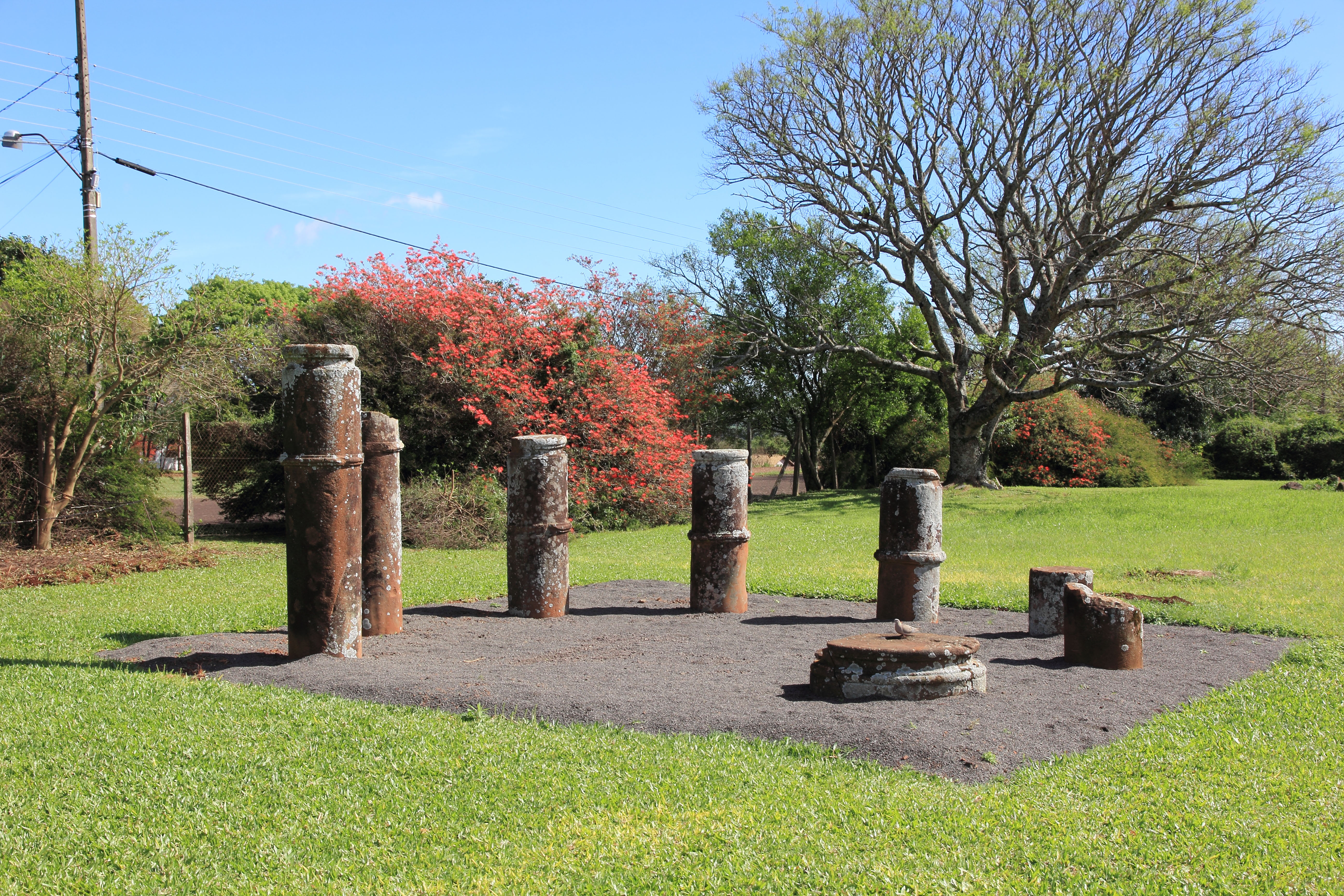
Columns which purpose has yet to be deciphered.

Only the foundations and some wall bases are left of the old native habitations and other structures. A cloister for the priests was located to the east of the church, leading to the church, the workshop courtyard and the square. In the middle of the courtyard was a sundial. The cloister was made up of rowed, intercommunicating rooms, paved with tiles, covered by a wide porch supported by stone columns, with doors opening onto the open courtyard. One room served as a dining room and its basement probably functioned as a wine cellar. Another balcony faced the back of the convent, overlooking the large orchard and vegetable garden, an area 274 m (899 ft) long and 68 m (223 ft) wide, where there were a number of fruit trees, sugar cane, vegetables, herbs and flowers, which according to ancient accounts were watered by a noria. The cloister also led to a 63 m (207 ft) courtyard, where there were warehouses, a vault with a prison, a trunk for punishments, workshops and other structures that have yet to be identified. Remnants of what is likely to have been a tambo, an inn where visitors were authorised to stay for a maximum of three days, are found next to the workshops. It may, however, have been a butcher's shop or a stable.The cemetery was located to the west of the church, with a plan of orthogonal avenues. A large cross had been placed in its centre, with another three-metre cross in nacre marquetry with gilded friezes. Men, women, boys and girls were buried in separate sections. Priests and indigenous leaders were buried inside the church. It is possible that in the basement of the transept there was a crypt for the burial of priests, but excavations to confirm this hypothesis have not yet been carried out. At the back of the cemetery there was a chapel where wakes were held. To the west of the cemetery, diverging from the plan of the reduction, the remains of the cotiguaçu were found, where living quarters were for widows, orphans and those whose husbands had left the village temporarily to work. It was a large house organised like a cloister. The native council, the Cabildo, probably operated in one of the houses at the far end of the square opposite the church, next to the central avenue, but its exact location has not yet been identified.

The other main structures in the settlement were the native habitations, a large group of regularly arranged pavilions, separated by straight avenues and divided into modules, each generally inhabited by one family, at most two. Evidence and literary records suggest that at the time of their abandonment these were all single-storey, with solid wooden frames and rammed earth or adobe walls, verandas with tiled roofs, supported by square stone pillars twelve metres high and beams decorated with carvings. The modules had no internal divisions and all of them had only one opening, the door, which always faced the direction of the church. Just like other structures, native dwellings underwent successive transformations, being more primitive in the early days. The old bibliography also mentions other buildings, such as a chapel dedicated to Santa Tecla, a pottery shop, a carpenter's shop, a hospital and outbuildings for the settlement's watchmen, but their location has not yet been discovered.

== Historical and cultural significance ==
The urban model of the missions has been considered a brilliant and original achievement for its context, with a much more structured system than the vast majority of colonial settlements of the time, and adapted to the local reality. According to Luiz Custódio,

"Having originated in the Spanish colonial context, [the Guaraní settlements] also used the administrative guidelines and urban references in force to structure a peculiar morphological and functional typology, which can be considered a variant of Spanish spatial organisation suited to a programme and a political and administrative situation of their own. [...] From an urban planning point of view, the mission experience has peculiarities that make it extremely important in the world history panorama. Most of the towns created from the Spanish post-Renaissance plans had their structuring elements, such as the layout, occupation, boundaries and land structure, defined in two-dimensional projects. This made it possible to give the urban spaces of cities of Spanish colonial origin different configurations, resulting from the occupation processes peculiar to each settlement, according to specific socio-economic and cultural factors in each time and place. In the missions, the ideal plan was defined as a typology and was applied in its three-dimensionality; in other words, in addition to the layout, the architecture of the towns was built in its entirety, with the formula being repeated in at least thirty cases among the Guaraní and ten among the Chiquitanos. These cases presented minor variations, mainly in terms of the architecture or the arrangement of certain elements in the complexes. This typology is fully recognisable as ‘missionary space’. Alongside the architecture, there were specific social practices related to the functioning of the missionary reduccion system. Cases like that of the Jesuit-Guarani settlements, the result of an integral urban conception that combines structured space with specific social practices, in a proposal built up and carried out over generations, are rare in the history of urbanism".

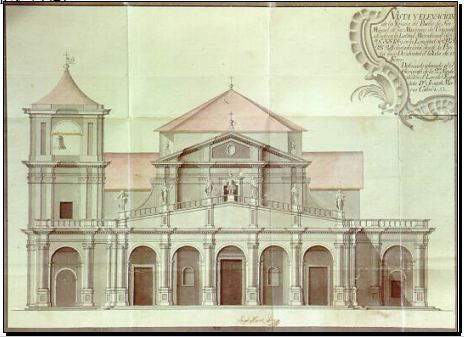
Facade elevation of the São Miguel Church in 1756, designed by Father Giovanni Battista Primoli.

Since its construction, the church itself has been seen as a work of superior quality, and several ancient records emphasise its monumental aspect. It was built in the third phase of Mission architecture, which corresponds, according to Custódio's classification, to its apogee, when European building systems were used, with stone load-bearing walls and brick vaults and domes. In Custódio's words,

"In the urban planning and architecture field, the São Miguel Arcanjo settlement played a pioneering role regarding the Seven Towns and within the missionary system. This is where European architects began to introduce so-called erudite architecture into the mission settlements, which began to overlap the formal and functionally consolidated urban structure of the missionary urban typology".

According to different authors (Schulze-Hofer, Marchiori, Gutierrez, Custódio, Rodrigues), the church ranks among the greatest building achievements of the Jesuit missionaries, with only one counterpart in the Trinidad reduction in Paraguay. The decoration used motifs typical of the region, such as the capitals that replaced the traditional acanthus leaves with artichoke leaves, and apepu fruits adorning the façades. However, its general style is directly derived from the European tradition, even if its exact characterisation and aesthetic genealogy are somewhat controversial. Its affinity with the Church of Jesus in Rome, designed by Giacomo Vignola, one of the fundamental works of Baroque architecture, has been pointed out and, in Custodio's words, ‘as well as being a landmark identifying the headquarters of the Society [of Jesus], it will be widely used as an archetype in Jesuit projects’. Paula Rodrigues says: ‘According to Custódio (2000) and Stello (2005), among others, the importance of the architectural complex of the São Miguel is due to the fact that it was at the centre of the events of the Guaranític War (1750-1756) and the Treaty of Madrid (1750), as well as the richness of the Jesuit reduction’.

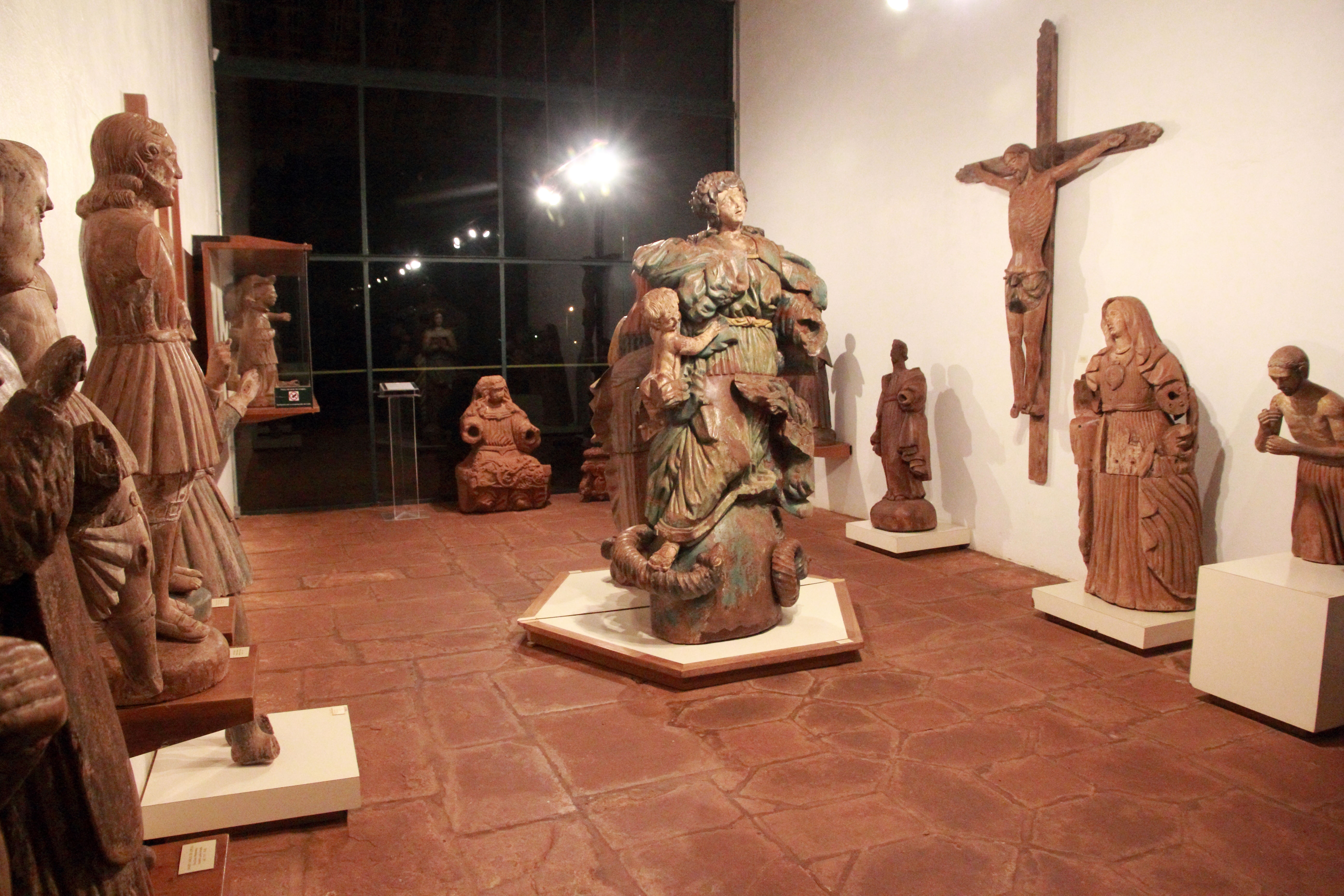
One of the rooms in the Missions Museum.

The civilisation created by the Jesuits in the Reductions has given rise to enormous controversy, debating its alleged merits and failures, but its material and immaterial heritage has an importance that is consensually recognised for its historical and cultural value. Its protection as a "Historic Site" by the State Government's 1922 Land Law, and its national listing by IPHAN in 1938, are further evidence of the monument's great importance, which was internationally recognised in 1983 when UNESCO listed it as a World Heritage Site. The listing included the Argentinean ruins of San Ignacio Miní, Nuestra Señora de Santa Ana, Nuestra Señora de Loreto and Santa María la Mayor in a statement: "The remains of these Jesuit missions are superlative examples of a type of building and architectural ensemble that illustrate a significant period in the history of Argentina and Brazil”.

The São Miguel ruins, especially the image of the church, have become one of the main icons of the state of Rio Grande do Sul. For the Movimento Tradicionalista Gaúcho, ‘the history of the missions is one of the roots of the regional culture of Rio Grande do Sul’, and they form the basis of an entire regionalist musical current, the so-called ‘missionary music’, which began in the 1960s as a form of political protest against the military dictatorship and cultural homogenisation. The site is the main source of community identification for São Miguel das Missões, which has formed around it directly linked to it. It is the most important cultural hub in the city, which has no other museums or theatres and few other cultural options, being at the centre of various local festivals, and one of the town's main sources of income through tourism. On the other hand, the growing regulatory interference from official and technical bodies far removed from the community has generated some tensions, as a portion of the citizens of São Miguel das Missões feel that the city and its inhabitants are being progressively sidelined from decisions regarding their main heritage and identity focus.

Currently, the site is also a major tourist attraction, receiving 80,000 visitors a year. It has been integrated into the Rota Missões state route, as the most important historical monument in the Missões Region, and is part of the Integrated International Circuit of the Guaraní Jesuit Missions, declared by UNESCO to be one of the four most important international cultural tourism routes in the world. The definition of the Circuit, which includes seven World Heritage Sites in Paraguay, Argentina and Brazil, is seen as opening up an auspicious path for fostering regional development, especially through tourism, and for bringing together culturally, politically and economically countries that share a common history. This untapped potential, which could also include Bolivia and Uruguay, has been recognised on a larger scale.

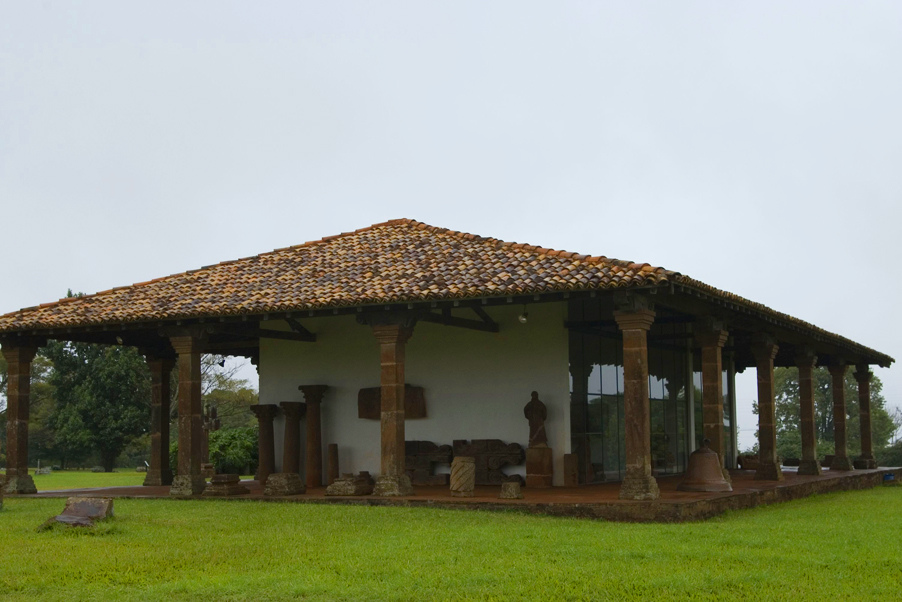
Missions Museum.

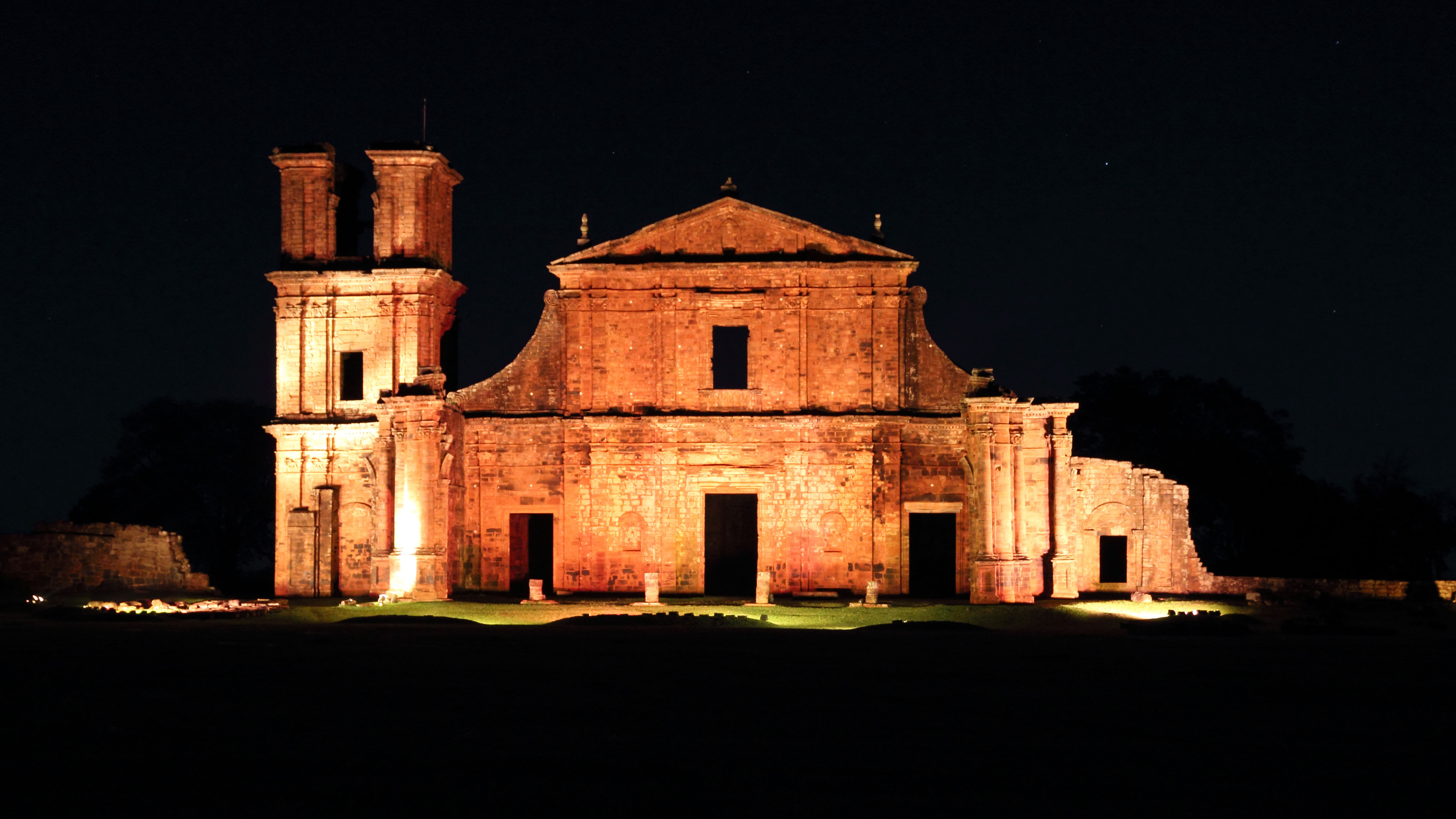
The ruins and their special lighting.

The Missions Museum, which is under the authority of the Brazilian Institute of Museums (IBRAM), has a diverse cultural programme and runs a system of guided tours. The museum building is an attraction in itself, and is considered by some authors to be one of the best achievements of the first Modernism in the state, but it was built more than seventy years ago, when a different concept of museology prevailed, and although it has already undergone two renovations, its suitability as a museum according to the most current conceptualisation is still problematic, lacking the space and equipment necessary for the perfect conservation, handling and exhibition of the collection. The site's space was upgraded with a special lighting project, creating the Sound and Light Show, which tells the story of the site through special effects. However, access to the area is difficult, the reception infrastructure is still poor, and there is relatively little publicity about the monument. In 2013, the monument celebrated the 30th anniversary of its inclusion on the World Heritage list, an occasion that was celebrated with festivities, cultural activities and the making of documentaries, and with the assurance of aid from the PAC for Historic Cities to improve the historic site's infrastructure and revitalise the Sound and Light Show. In April 2016, a tornado hit the region. The ruins suffered a superficial impact but the museum was seriously damaged, as well as causing serious damage to 83 pieces in the collection. A few days after the disaster, IBRAM and IPHAN began organising a restoration project in partnership with other institutions. While it was being finalised, the museum was evacuated and its collection provisionally installed in a nearby building. In September 2017 the building was reopened to the public, fully restored, but part of the collection was still under restoration. The work cost R$1.68 million.

Despite the contradictions inherent in the Jesuit missionary project, it seems that the natives became very attached to their settlements. An account by Saint-Hilaire, who visited the region in 1822, states that a few elderly natives who still lived there remembered the priests with affection, and that time as a golden age. The former reduction of São Miguel still has a strong appeal for the Guaraní communities that survive in the neighbourhood, who are direct heirs to the colonial culture. According to Walmir Pereira, the ruins ‘represent for the Mbyá an effective practical-symbolic reference in the mythical-historical incorporation of the temporal experience of the reduction, [...] a powerful symbol of native tradition and ancestry’, creating new readings of history in accordance with their own experiences, memories and perceptions. Government programmes and academic bodies have sought to develop projects to promote traditions linked to the site, including the installation of a Memory Point and the National Inventory of Cultural References of the Mbyá-Guaraní Community in São Miguel Arcanjo, which began in 2004 and documents their cultural references, their way of life and their relationship with the ruins, known to them as Tava Miri, or Sacred Stone Village. Anthropologist Maria Inês Ladeira wrote an expressive account of Krexu Miri, a Guarani spiritual leader:

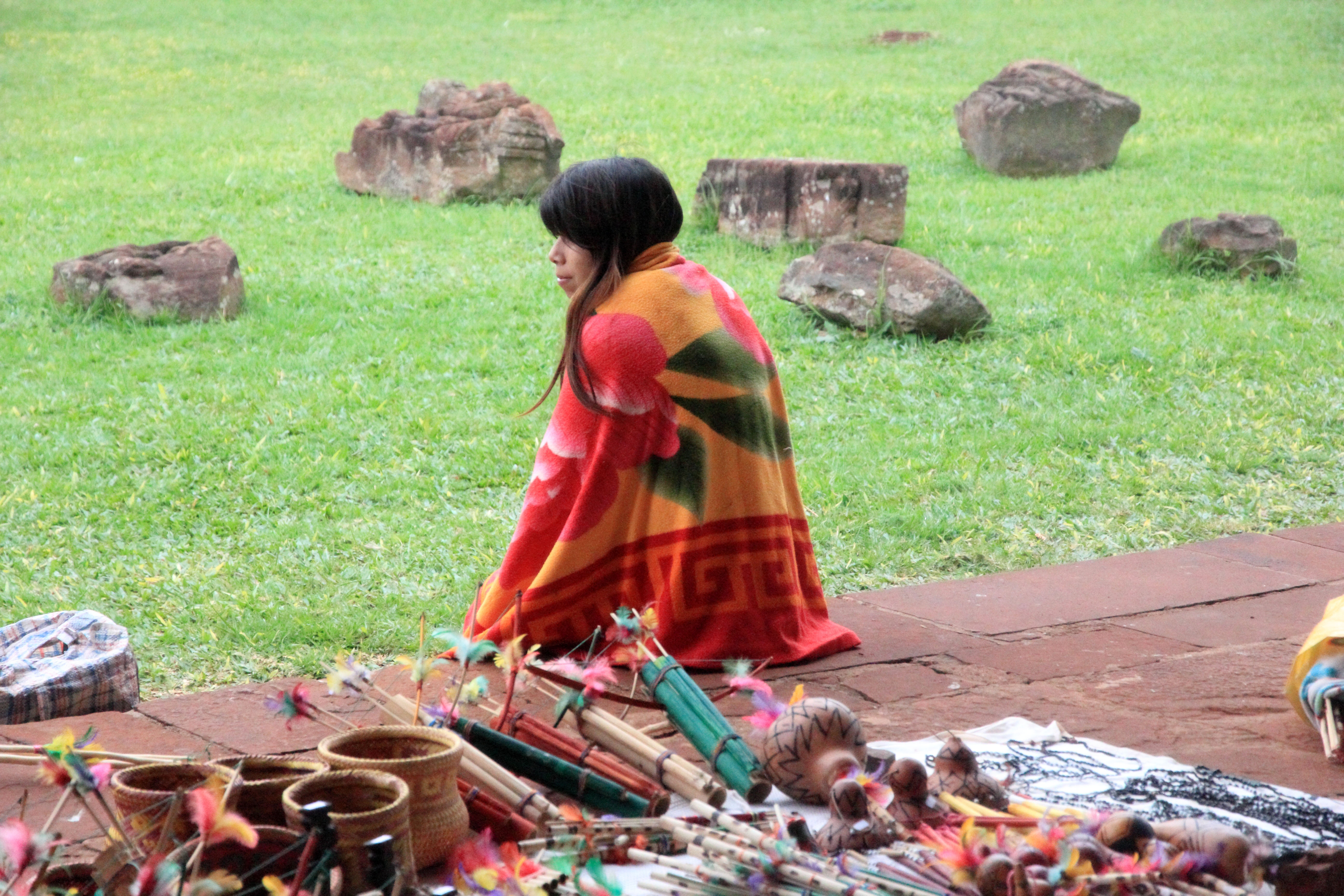
A Guarani woman selling artefacts next to the Missions Museum building.

"This is the work of the true ancients, the Guaraní Natives. Where our grandparents Nhanderú Mirim heard the word of Nhanderu Tenondegua (our first father) and taught the children and adults to follow the right path. This is the real work, and I didn't think that one day I would set foot in this place. This is the place where our ancient grandparents stayed before leaving for another world (yvyju mirim). The white man tried to destroy it, but Nhanderu wouldn't let him. Our true father made this tava, this is the work of our ancient Guaraní relatives. Work that will never end, this tava, even though the whites come to visit every day. This was our true father who made it, and because there are no people (nhandéva) who mourn for it, that's why the whites say that it was they who left it in the past".

As part of this Tava Miri status, in 2015 the site was granted special status by IPHAN, inscribed in the Register of Places as Cultural Heritage of Brazil. The ruins have also been added to a religious tourism route, the Caminho das Missões (Way of the Missions), which crosses several towns in the region, inspired by the famous Camino de Santiago de Compostela, and includes Christian and Guaraní elements.

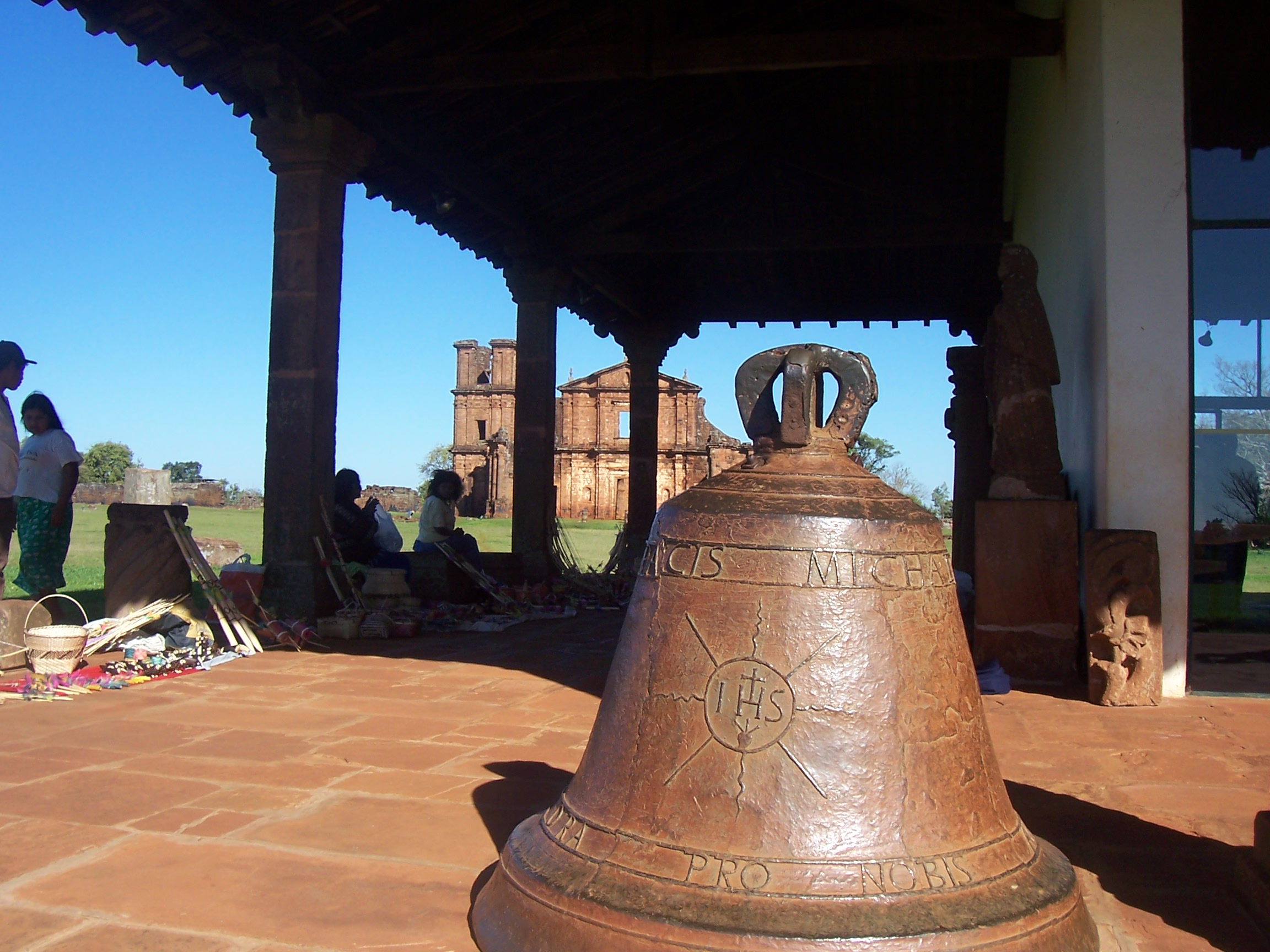
Old church bell and native art in the Missions Museum, São Miguel das Missões.

The site still remains a valuable field of study for archaeologists, historians and other specialists, with several projects related to the ancient reduction under development, and has generated a considerable academic bibliography. In the statement of Roberto di Stefano, a consultant for UNESCO, the site is the most scientifically studied Brazilian monument. UNESCO and IPHAN have provided ongoing support for the material preservation of the site, the recovery of its intangible heritage and the promotion of cultural and educational activities, and among the other institutions that have actively participated in promoting various aspects of the site are the World Monuments Fund, the Brazilian Institute of Museums, the Andalusian Institute of Historical Heritage and the Italian-Latin American Institute. The Missions Project - Computer Graphics, in collaboration with IPHAN, produced a virtual and interactive reconstruction of the historic site and its buildings. The church was used as the basic model for the construction of the Santo Ângelo Cathedral, with the addition of an extra tower and some modifications to the design.

== See also ==
- The Mission (1986) — film starring Robert De Niro and Jeremy Irons, about the Jesuit Missions and the Guaraní War. The film set represented what is known of the appearance of the 18th-century São Miguel das Missões.
- Guarani War
- Jesuit Reductions
- List of Jesuit sites
- San Ignacio Miní
- Spanish missions in South America
- Baroque in Brazil
- Sculpture of the Misiones Orientales
