= Sculpture of the Misiones Orientales =

Sculptures of the Jesuit missions among the Guarani

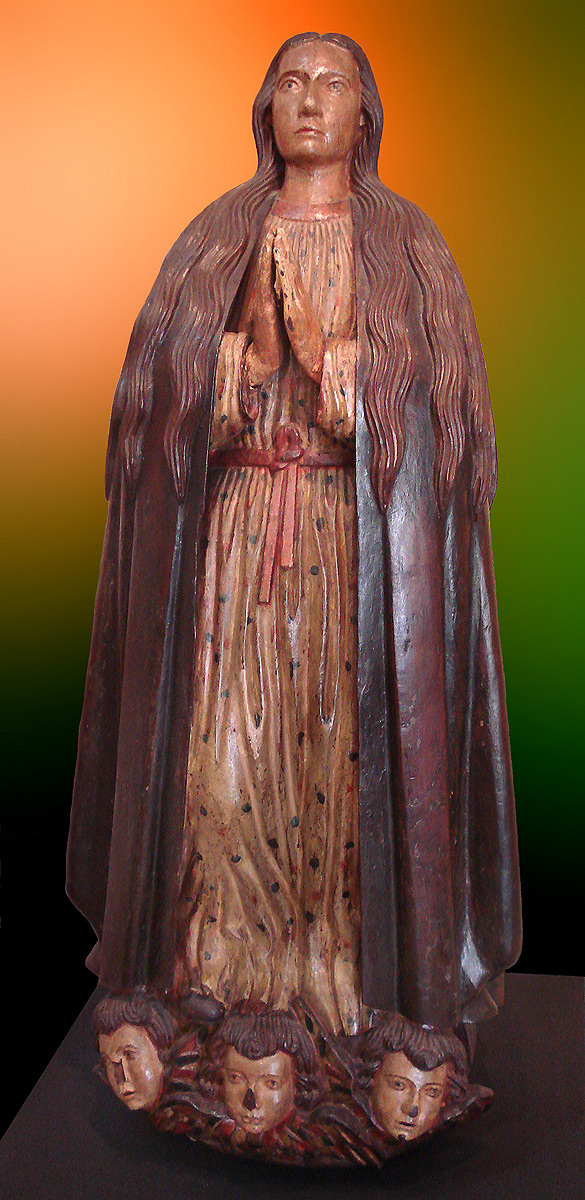
Nossa Senhora da Conceição (collection of the Júlio de Castilhos Museum). Indigenous features are present in the face and hair (long and straight).

The Sculpture of the Misiones Orientales represents one of the most substantial and valuable surviving legacies of the culture of the Misiones Orientales, a group of Jesuit missions among the Guarani founded in the current Brazilian state of Rio Grande do Sul. At the time owned by Spain, the Misiones Orientales were typical examples of the missionary model developed by the Jesuits in the Americas: an indigenous community fixed in a more or less self-sufficient settlement, and administered by the priests of the Society of Jesus, with the help of the natives. The success of the missions was enormous, being social, cultural, political, economic, and urbanistic projects that were advanced for their time and place. The participation of the Indians was not achieved without difficulties, but thousands chose to live in these settlements voluntarily, being converted to Catholicism and acculturated to the forms and manners of European life, producing large quantities of art, always under Jesuit supervision.

This artistic production, where sculpture appeared in prominence, was guided by European aesthetic models, and emerged with the basic purpose of providing a visual aid to the catechesis of the indigenous - in the process of evangelization organized by the missionaries of the New World. These works incorporated a multiplicity of stylistic currents, some updated, others long obsolete in Europe itself. However, there was a predominance of Baroque forms, and characteristics of the natives were also infused to some extent. Thus, such works reveal unique characteristics that define them, according to some authors, as an individualized regional form. Most of the missionary sculpture collection was lost over time, but there is still a significant collection of more than 500 pieces distributed among public institutions and private collections.

The importance of the missionary sculptures as a historical and artistic document is immense, and for this reason, it was listed by the National Institute of Historic and Artistic Heritage. The remaining collection still needs attention and care not to be further depreciated, especially considering that half of the identified pieces belong to private individuals and are not preserved as they should be, and some continue to disappear or are getting destroyed despite official protection.

Among critics, however, the Sculpture of the Misiones Orientales is still a matter of controversy: for some, it is a unique and original expression of the multifaceted Latin American Baroque, while for others it is nothing more than a crude and slavish imitation of European models.

== Misiones Orientales ==
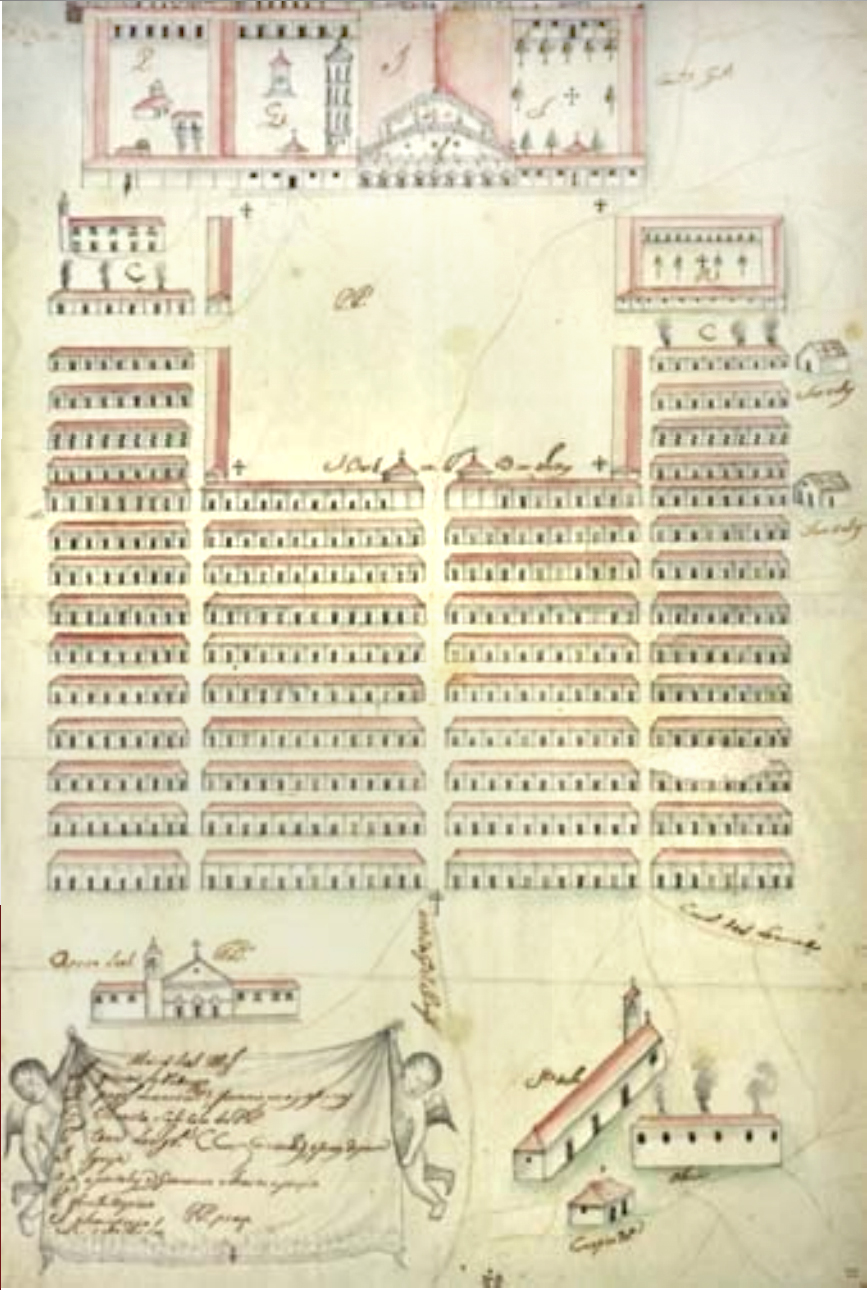
Plan of the settlement of São Miguel Arcanjo.

The Misiones Orientales were a typical example of the main model of evangelization created by the Jesuits in the Americas: fixed settlements (missions) in villages that brought together the native people. The history of the missions goes back to the ministry of the Apostles instituted by Jesus himself, when he sent his disciples to go around the world proclaiming the gospel. The main objective of these settlements was to create a society with the benefits and qualities of European Christian society, but free of its vices and wickedness. These missions were founded by the Jesuits throughout the colonial Americas, and according to Manuel Marzal, summarized the views of other scholars, constituting one of the most remarkable utopias in history.

The Jesuits became famous for their pragmatism and adaptability to the conditions they encountered in each place; they were disciplined, enterprising, and well-prepared in various fields of knowledge, having in their ranks many artists, literati, scientists, and scholars, and were also skilled in the arts of persuasion and teaching. They were the vanguard of European religiosity in their day. The combination of so many qualities explains their success as missionaries and is reflected in the variety of practical solutions adopted in the missions they founded throughout America and the Orient. They also adopted a peculiar theology, which allowed them to yield and conform the Christian doctrine to the native perceptions to achieve the completeness of the evangelizing project. It is known, therefore, that Jesuit missionarism in the eastern part of South America, then controlled by the Portuguese, developed in a different direction from that adopted in the Misiones Orientales, which were under Spanish rule. There the Jesuits were able to build much more organized and stable settlements than those created in colonial Brazil under Father Manuel da Nóbrega and his colleagues.

In the region submitted to the Jesuit Province of Paraguay, which included the Misiones Orientales, and which many consider having set the "classic" prototype of the Jesuit settlement, this settlement was defined around a large square, where there was a church, Indian residences, houses for widows and orphans, a school, the missionaries' cloister, a cemetery, several workshops and small industries that supplied basic needs, an orchard, a vegetable garden, administrative spaces, an inn, a prison, among other improvements. On semi-autonomous farms nearby, there were black slaves, the cultivation of crops, and the raising of cattle. They bartered their products with various Spanish colonies and Europe. Sometimes the surroundings of the urbanized nucleus were protected with trenches and a wall to defend against the attacks of wild Indians and the predatory expeditions of the Brazilian bandeirantes, which occurred many times. Therefore, some missions, by special license from the Spanish Crown, had small armies and cavalry. The government of civil affairs and elementary education were generally handed over to the Indians and respected tribal hierarchies. Advanced education-including the direction of arts, engineering, and architecture, the divine offices, catechesis, and justice, as well as general supervision of all affairs, were left to the Jesuits.

The missionary urban model could present variations in the layout of elements and the number of buildings, but its basic scheme remained constant. In short, the settlements were almost self-sufficient city-states, theocratically oriented, economically and culturally advanced for their time and place, and had considerable administrative autonomy. They were, however, subject to general regulation by the high hierarchy of the Society and needed the approval of the Spanish Crown, conqueror, and owner of the land, on which it taxed the priests. Spain also had a political interest in the Jesuit enterprise, wanting them to act as frontier guards, containing the Portuguese advance. The missions provided innovative livelihoods by indigenous standards and inaugurated a very successful urban and administrative model, but were programs of mass religious conversion and acculturation of the indigenous to the European way of life, which did not always occur without resistance and difficulties. On the other hand, they sought to preserve or integrate many of the characteristics of traditional aboriginal life in an unprecedented sociocultural synthesis. Apart from the controversies that still surround the subject, especially about its ethical merit, in any case, it is a fact that an original culture was created within the missions, and in this culture, art had an extraordinary role to play.

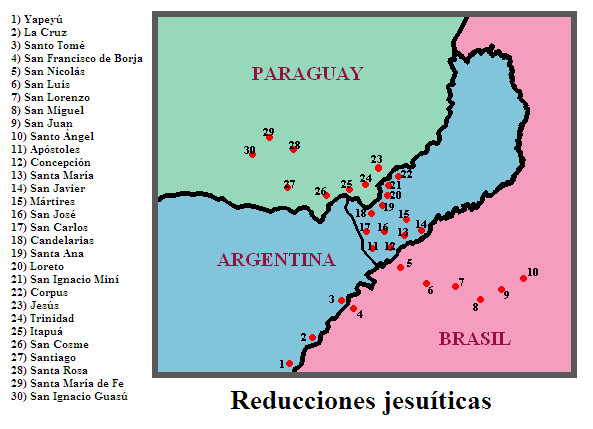
The Trinta Povos of the Province of Paraguay. In the area in pink, the red dots correspond to the Misiones Orientales.

The Misiones Orientales were born as an evolution of the eighteen Tape Reductions, founded in 1626 on the eastern bank of the Uruguay River, in a region that is now part of the state of Rio Grande do Sul, in Brazil. About ten years later, the Brazilian bandeirantes destroyed fifteen of these settlements and imprisoned more than 20,000 Indians, to be sold as slaves in São Paulo. In 1638 they destroyed the three remaining settlements. Under this siege, the remaining Indians and priests took refuge on the western bank of the Uruguay river. The bandeirante advance was only stopped in the Battle of Mbororé, in 1641, but then, with the dissolution of the Iberian Union, new political facts put the missionary enterprise in the region on hold, only to be resumed in 1682. Then the seven settlements that became known as the Misiones Orientales (or Sete Povos das Missões/Siete Pueblos de las Misiones, "Seven Settlements of the Missions" in English) were created, some of them on the ruins of the previous foundation.

They were, as reported by Pinto:

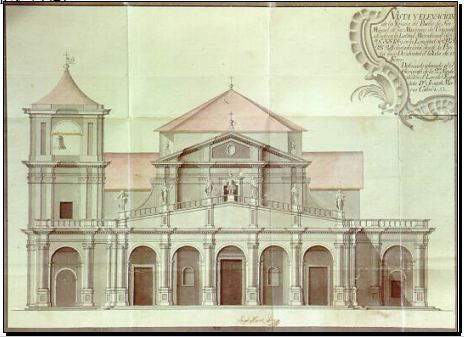
View and elevation of St. Michael's Church in 1756, designed by Father Giovanni Battista Primoli.

- São Nicolau, founded in 1626 by Father Roque González y de Santa Cruz and reinstalled in 1687 by Father Anselmo de la Matta
- São Miguel Arcanjo, founded by Father Cristóvão de Mendoza in 1632 and reinstalled in 1687 by Father Anton Sepp
- San Francisco de Borja, founded in 1682 by Father Francisco Garcia de Prada
- São Luiz Gonzaga, founded in 1687 by father Miguel Fernández
- São Lourenço Mártir, founded in 1690 by priest Bernardo de la Vega
- São João Batista, founded in 1697 by father Anton Sepp
- Santo Ângelo Custódio, founded in 1706 by priest Diego Haze

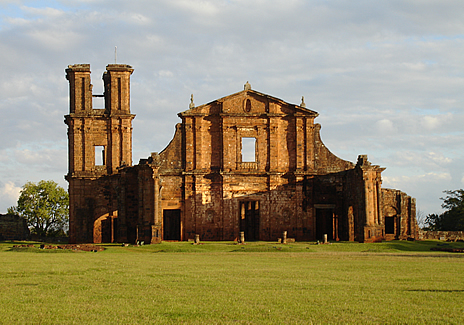
St. Michael's Ruins today.

While the first missionary initiative in the region had mostly evangelizing objectives, as stated by Armindo Trevisan, those of the second one seem to have been primarily economic, born from the perspective of taking advantage of the huge cattle herd that lived free in the pampas, and that was coveted also by the Portuguese. The Brazilian tropeiros who hunted the cattle became one of the first agents of the aggressive Portuguese penetration in the region, invading larger and larger Spanish territories. Cattle acquired such importance for the Jesuits as they understood that if the living conditions for the Indians were not good, especially regarding food, the spiritual education also failed. Cattle were easily raised, and were well used: they provided leather, meat and milk, as well as being a means of traction and transportation. Horses and mules were also abundant. It is estimated that this herd, including the various species, at one time reached a million heads. However, for Maldi, the political component of the settlements was also strong:

The recolonization of part of the lost areas and the foundation of new missions were done with the Guarani Indians assuming the role of "prisoners" - that is, "border guards". Under this condition, the seven settlements that would become famous as the Seven Settlements of the Missions would be founded on the eastern bank of the Uruguay river, becoming, as Gadelha (1996) states, "a future center of resistance to the Treaty of Madrid". As "frontier inmates", the Guarani Indians were widely requested by the governors from 1637 to 1735 for a variety of tasks on the frontier, from fighting enemy groups to surveillance work, which was a definitive factor in intensifying the persecution of the paulista bandeirantes. On the other hand, the reconstitution of the Guaranitic missions in the south, with the firm purpose of stopping the Portuguese advance, made the Indians the target of Lusitanian violence.

Being home to up to thirty thousand people, mainly Guarani, but also some from other groups, such as the Charrúas and Minuanos, the Misiones Orientales flourished until the new territorial demarcations imposed by the Treaty of Madrid of 1750, which determined the exchange of Colonia del Sacramento (a Portuguese possession) for the settlements, and the Indians and priests were to be resettled further into Spanish territory. The Guaranitic War that followed (1754-1756), where Sepé Tiaraju emerged as a historical and mythological figure, was the expression of the refusal by the Guaranis to surrender the missions they had arduously built.

After the war, lost by the Indians, and the expulsion of the Jesuits from the Portuguese and Spanish territories, respectively in 1759 and 1768, the Seven Settlements were dismantled, along with the other Jesuit missions. The dissolution of the Society of Jesus in 1773, by Pope Clement XIV, sealed the end of the whole missionary cycle. An attempt was made to introduce a civil government with the collaboration of other Orders, such as the Franciscans, Dominicans, and Mercedarians, but to no effect: production fell drastically, there were riots, desertions, and mass deaths, imprisonment of Indians, depredations of buildings and looting of churches. When a new war broke out between Portugal and Spain in 1801, the Misiones Orientales were already in such a state of disintegration that their conquest by the Portuguese was easy, although there seems to have been Indian participation as a facilitator of the takeover. In 1828, the settlements were plundered by the troops of Fructuoso Rivera, who stole 60 carts of precious objects and works of art and caused a new indigenous exodus. In 1833, there were only 377 Indians in the region, described by a chronicler of the time as "a bagasse of people."

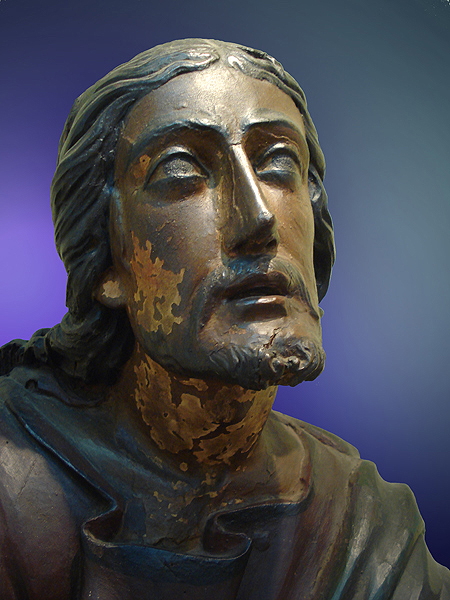
Senhor dos Passos, Julio de Castilhos Museum.

== Missionary art ==
The Indians were to be won over by Christ; this was the basic motivation of the Jesuits. Realizing that the Indians were manipulable to a degree, the priests, who were also skilled pedagogues, introduced various artistic resources as aid to catechesis. Thus, they translated European moralizing dramas into the Guarani language, or wrote new ones, always staging them; classical music was played and composed, as was done in the churches of Europe. Imposing churches were built, lavishly adorned, lined with narrative paintings and eloquently expressive statuary. The Indians, according to reports, marveled at all of it: at the splendor and mystery of the worship (which seemed to them prodigies and magic), were fascinated by the sacred music, fearfully venerated the images, and were thus led to emotional conversion, often becoming ardent devotees.

Jesuit pedagogy was, in turn, a product of rhetoric and Counter-Reformation, developed in a period when the intellectual uncertainties of Mannerism introduced the dramas and material-spirit contrasts of the Baroque. In this pedagogy, the spectacularization of religious worship was a valid and efficient means of persuading the potentially devout and propagating faith. It was an essential part of the Baroque spirit itself, when the representation of the world became all a spectacle designed to ravish its audience. All the arts came together, and their greatest expression in sacred art was the architecture of the Baroque church, with all its decorative plethora of emotional appeal. At the moment of worship, the temple became a ferocious theater where the Christian drama was played out. In the settlements, in the absence of secular power, the church was the only building with a high degree of sophistication, because it centralized the life of the whole community; almost all the other structures in the settlement were low and constituted of simple pavilions. But at the church worshiping was glorious, enlivened by the positive collaboration of the indigenous people in the production and execution of all this ceremonial art.

== Sculpture and its functions ==
Besides elementary education and catechism, the most skilled Indians were instructed in various trades and arts under the direct supervision of the priests. The models of missionary art were all European, and in the churches, the role played by images was extremely important as a means of Christianization. The pedagogical potential of art had long been known in the West, largely justified by the general illiteracy of the European masses, when images supplied what was not accessible to the people through reading. Churches, with their rich decoration of narrative content, were known as "the Bible of the illiterate". However, this function of art was complemented and contextualized by a direct explanation of the concepts conveyed by the images, directing the interpretation of the faithful to the intended meaning and creating a repertoire of signifying forms, a true visual language that could be extrapolated to other situations.

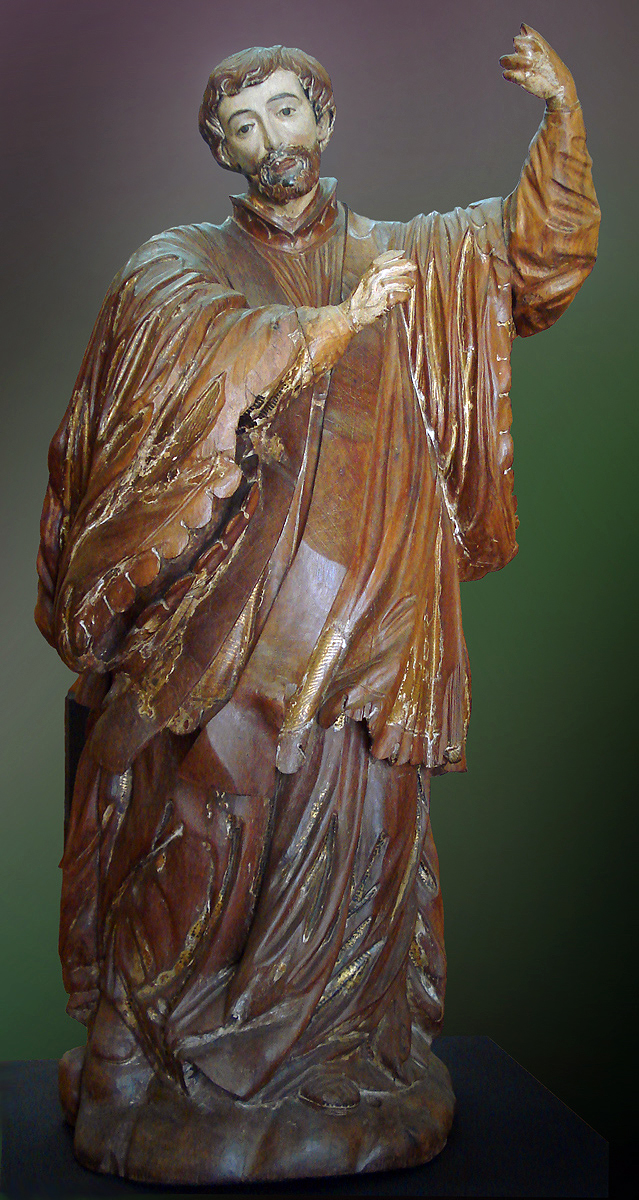
Saint Francis Xavier, Julio de Castilhos Museum.

Since there was no idol or image worship among the Guarani, the Jesuits found this peculiar behavior an expedient approach. If in Mexico the native idols had been traumatically annihilated, in the American South there was room to introduce the natural religiosity of the indigenous devotion to Christian images, some of them produced with the participation of the native himself. The Baroque style was wisely used for this purpose. In Boff's words,

"In churches and squares, the multiplicity of decorative elements used by artists, to represent the saints and their attributes, found a unique space for Baroque expression. The same happened in the liturgical ritual, with the chants and incense. In theater, there were the acts of the saints performed in the squares. In the painting of the church ceilings, there were celestial images; in the sculptures, the gestures of the images communicating with the spectator in a symbolic language very well worked by the Baroque artist. Moreover, in the settlements the images were intended for use on the altars. If we observe their posture carefully, we will notice that they relate to each other, having gestures in tune with each other. They are intended to involve the mind and the senses and, consequently, to favor the rapture and to persuade the spirit towards the things of God? The production of images, in the missions, was one of the most important jobs the natives did. One can notice, through the Jesuits' records, the importance of the use of the image as a way to persuade the Indians to frequent the sacraments and pray, either through its external beauty, or by the life model it represented, and this was very significant, by its facial expression and posture. There are endless accounts from the priests concerning the image of the Virgin Mary and its power of persuasion...This image was used in catechesis as a reflection of the heavenly world. It reinforced the evangelical preaching, transmitting what the Bible did through writing. To venerate an image was to venerate the person who was represented in it and, consequently, to follow in their footsteps."

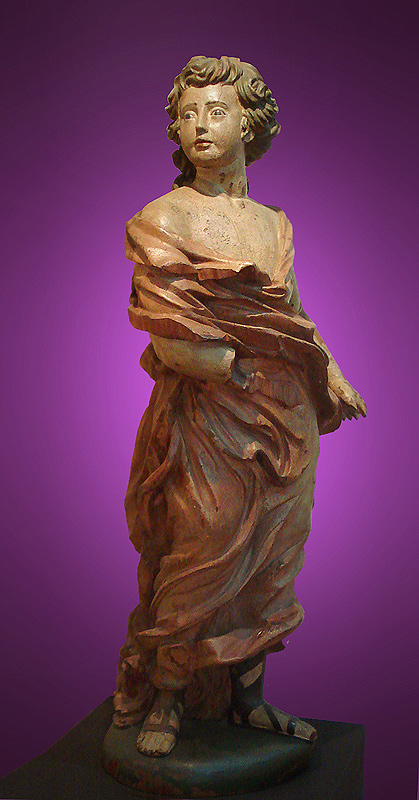
Angel, Julio de Castilhos Museum, authorship attributed to Brasanelli by Sustersic.

Despite the care taken by the priests, in many cases the understanding of the message taught was distorted by the Indian's prior culture. As an example, Father Sepp reported that an Indian woman stabbed herself after hearing a painting of Our Lady of Sorrows, with her heart studded with knives, telling her: "Just as I opened my chest by piercing my virginal heart, you, my daughter, take this knife and open your chest to free your soul from prison." Particularly the Guarani, among other peoples, transferred several of the magical powers of their religion to Christian sculptures and images. One example, as Susnik quotes, was that "the Guarani saw in the cross a magical power, similar to the powers the shamans had in their hands when they held the maraca, the musical-religious instrument that contained within it the aivú, the soul of the person. The same situation must have occurred in relation to holy communion, identifying the act of eating the "body of Christ", the communion bread, with their cannibalistic ritual. Another rite reminiscent of pre-Hispanic ceremonies was the Indians' self-flagellation with the mussurana, one of the objects used in human cannibalism, during Holy Week, then having a barbecue and receiving meat to eat in their homes.

The sculptures flourished when the churches had already been built and the Misiones Orientales had stabilized. While paintings show a complete scene, important for understanding their narrative content, sculptures needed the setting of the churches to function. But unlike two-dimensional images, sculptures have more "presence" and therefore exerted a special power over the Indians, who believed that they were somehow alive. The statues were even invited to feasts, where they occupied a place of honor at the head of the table, and exercised other very specific functions, among which the most important were vigilance and favoritism.

The influence exercised by the images was manifested, for example, when certain statues were manipulated by the priests as if they were puppets, moving their arms and heads and making signs of approval or censure, according to the behavior of the natives. Another case was the daily carrying of a statue of Saint Isidro the Farmer to the plantations to watch over the work in the fields. The favoring was best expressed in the response to requests and prayers, through miracles negotiated between the supplicants and the saints, who, in their condition as intercessors before God, also acted to protect the devotees and the settlements against various dangers. The Jesuits' accounts multiply descriptions of miracles and apparitions related to sacred images, which attests to their great impact on that society.

=== The surviving collection and its characteristics ===
The Mission Museum located in São Miguel das Missões, next to the Ruins of São Miguel das Missões, houses the largest surviving set of sculptures of the Seven Peoples. This collection was only gathered at the beginning of the 20th century, after Lúcio Costa, working for the National Institute of Historic and Artistic Heritage (IPHAN), made a survey and inventory of the Rio Grande do Sul mission region in 1937. Contact with the remnants of the Jesuit reductions seems to have impressed him intensely. According to Carrilho,

"The interest in ancient art, the way he recognizes in these manifestations the expression of past cultures, and the acute awareness that he is facing testimonies under the threat of disappearance, are reflected in the poetic and somewhat desolate tone of the text of his travel report. More than once, the architect resorted to nostalgic and sentimental evocations to describe the impact caused by the tenuous but strong presence of those 'remains' and what was able to create the association of the "unmistakable personality" of the Jesuit priests with the Guarani culture."

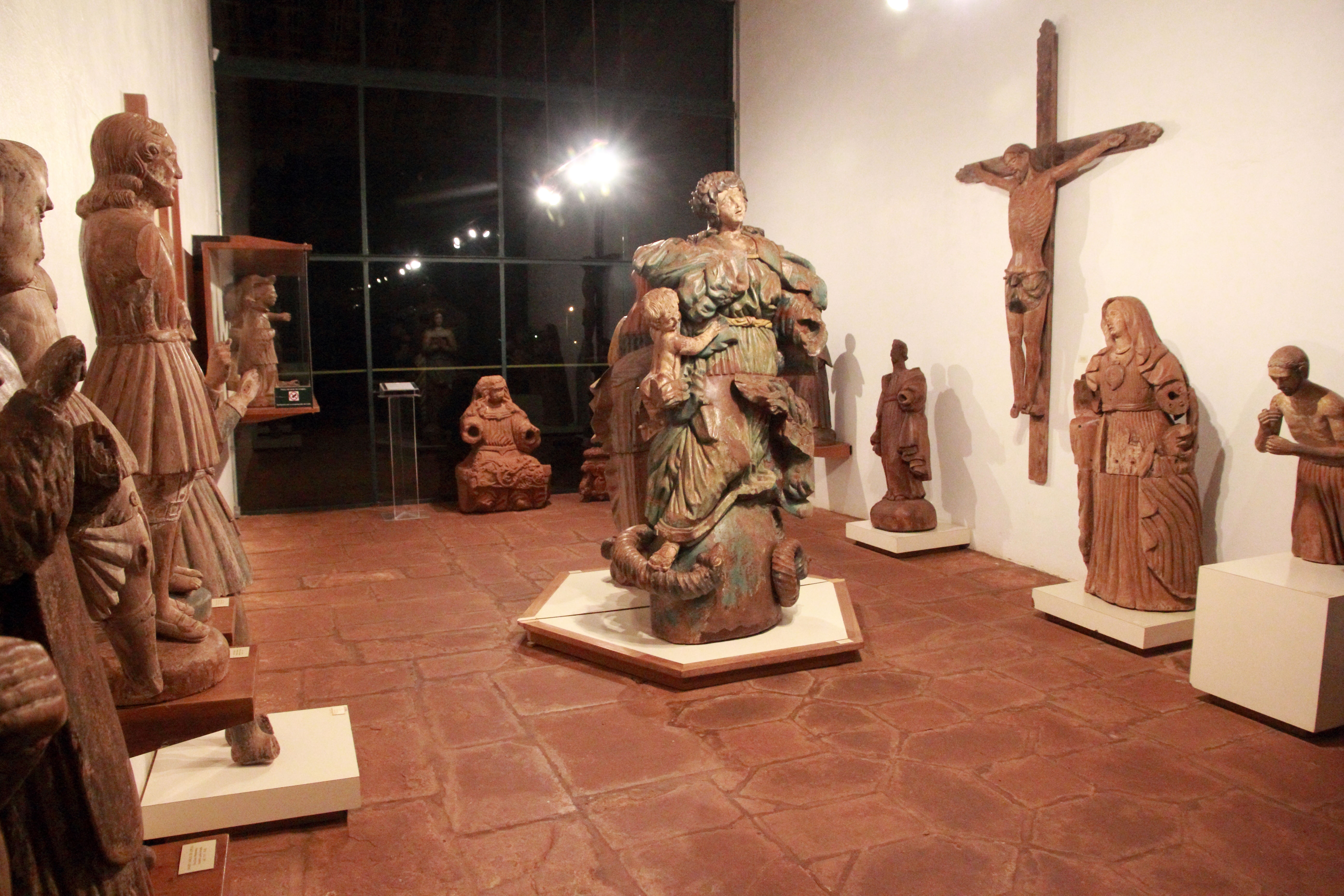
Artworks from the Missions Museum.

Costa suggested concentrating the entire missionary legacy in São Miguel, not only to make it more accessible but because it was the only settlement that was still in sufficient conservation conditions to generate architectural interest. Once the measures to consolidate the ruins were defined, it was still needed to protect the collection of religious imagery and make it available to the public through the creation of a museum.

At the time of its creation, the museum had only three images. By 1993 it already had 94 cataloged pieces, most of them collected in the region by João Hugo Machado, often with the coercive help of the police to make families hand over the artworks to the museum, which they invariably did against their will and not infrequently protested violently. This collection is divided into two main groups: sculptures with European characteristics and others markedly native. The former is influenced by Italian sculptors such as Bernini, and Spanish sculptors such as Juan Martínez Montañés, Alonso Cano, and José de Mora, seen in images such as Our Lady of the Conception, St. Michael the Archangel, and St. Joseph with the Child. On the other hand, some pieces of artwork show signs of indigenous culture, in forms marked by the geometric characteristic of basketry, ceramics, and body painting. Most of them present mutilations and partial or total loss of color, due to the vicissitudes to which they were subjected over the years.

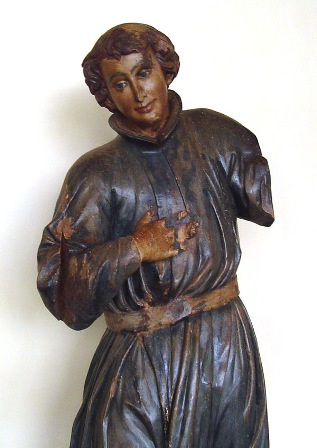
Saint Stanislaus Kostka, Missions Museum, authorship attributed to Brasanelli by Sustersic.

An inventory of 1768 states that there should be in all the Thirty Peoples of the Province of Paraguay at least two thousand statues in the churches, not counting other decorative objects. Another inventory, by Francisco Bruno de Zavala, made on July 8, 1778, lists 57 images in São Miguel. The list compiled in 2008 by IPHAN listed 510 missionary statues in Brazil, the set being dispersed among several private collections and public institutions. Besides the Missions Museum, other images are found in some churches and museums in the Missões region, most notably the Museu Monsenhor Estanislau Wolski, in Santo Antônio das Missões, with a rich collection of 73 miniatures, still largely forgotten by scholars; the Museu Municipal Aparício Silva Rillo, in São Borja, with 35 pieces, and the Cathedral of São Luiz Gonzaga, with 13 images. Others are in museums and Catholic schools in the Greater Porto Alegre area, especially the Júlio de Castilhos Museum in the capital, and the Anchietano Museum of Unisinos in São Leopoldo. The Museum Vincente Pallotti in Santa Maria also holds a group of statues. The large number of statues has allowed many to have obscurely survived in churches and private collections in Argentina, Paraguay, Uruguay, and other countries, awaiting identification. A significant group of 13 sculptures was found in the Azores. This exemplifies the richness of the original collection and how much has been dispersed or lost over the years.

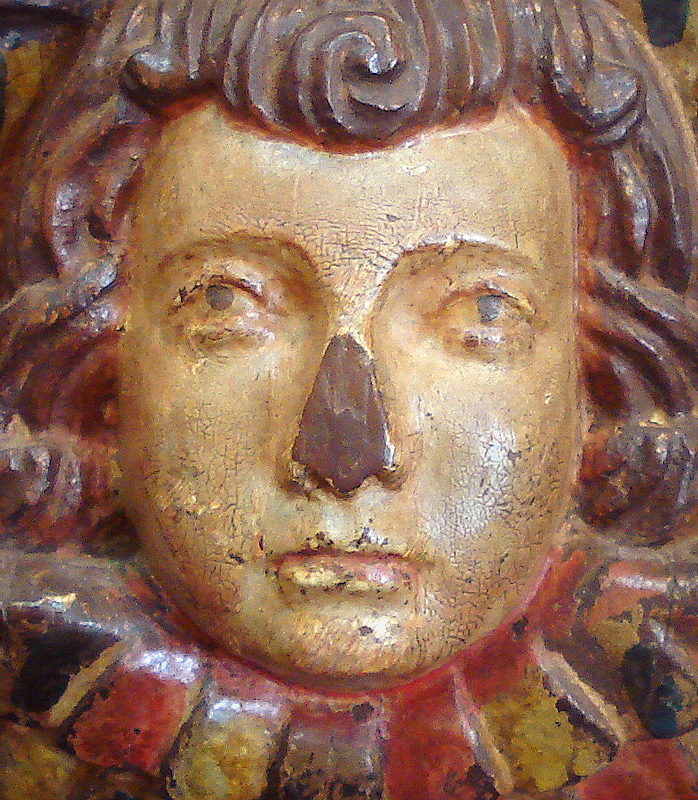
Detail of the angel's head at the feet of the statue of Immaculate Conception, with colors in good condition. Julio de Castilhos Museum.

The dating and identification of authorship are invariably difficult, if not impossible in most cases. The general working habit was cooperative, and no work was signed or dated by the authors. Some, however, were attributed to one priest or another, as several were established artists, among them Giuseppe Brasanelli, Francisco Ribera, and Anton Sepp, who have created or designed some of the most sophisticated pieces that still remain today. In Sustersic's opinion, Father Brasanelli was a determining figure in the formation of the "missionary style," and that "nothing produced in the Guarani missions was immune to his labor, his teaching, or his influence." Josefina Plá proposed the identification of at least forty images as coming from the hands of Brasanelli or his immediate circle (not all of them in Brazil, since the priest traveled to various towns in the Province of Paraguay). The only work that can be safely attributed to him by documentary testimony is the kneeling Saint Francis of Borja, which is preserved (heavily repainted) in the Cathedral of São Borja, and which served as the basis for the other identifications. Another important figure was Father Anselmo de la Matta, who, for Damasceno, was responsible for turning the settlement of São Nicolau into a center for exporting artworks to other peoples. More than two thousand Jesuits passed through the Province of Paraguay, half of them Spanish, and the rest from 32 other nationalities, which attests to the great role of the international contribution to the missionary enterprise in Paraguay. There was also some artistic exchange between the Seven Peoples and the missions in Peru. From these different nations, the Jesuits brought to the Missions the style in vogue in their countries, without forgetting medieval, Romanesque, or Gothic references. The fusion of all these influences enabled the creation of an eclectic and peculiar Baroque.

The iconography of missionary statuary represents, in its majority, saints, angels, martyrs, Our Lady, and the saints of the Society of Jesus, presented as role models. It is a matter of much controversy to measure how much the indigenous people have put themselves in the sculptural production, and how much they are, therefore, original and not simple reproductions. Some say that the alleged "ethnic" traits noted in the missionary sculpture are nothing more than distortions caused by the simple technical incompetence of the indigenous craftsmen. From his analysis of the Missions Museum collection, Boff concluded that it is aligned with the general characteristics of American missionary production, with the presence of a wide variety of European stylistic elements, forming a truly eclectic art, although with a predominance of Baroque forms. He also notes an equally variable degree of sophistication in sculptural technique, with some crude and disproportionate statues and others of great refinement and fine finish. Sustersic, on the other hand, points out that it is very difficult to identify the artistic production coming from each settlement, due to its variables and the mixture of expressions determined by the mentality of the artist and their society. Some researchers tried to identify typically Indian features and adornments in several of these works, with solid evidence. It is known, however, that there was strict ecclesiastical regulation for the production of images, and the creative freedom of the indigenous person must then have been limited. Some works feature a dorsal excavation, possibly to reduce the weight of the statues, and others have movable joints so that one could manipulate the statues and impress the indigenous people.

This production is not uniform, but some elements prove it is an individualized regional product, possessing its own style. Boff believes that the indigenous people managed to transmit to the sculptures the symbolic function of their ancestral culture in its essential features, even if not in a fully conscious way. Gruzinski argues that

"The works produced by the mestizo contingent cannot be analyzed simply, by a closed and conclusive evolutionary process. By mixing the cultural collections, they are enriched and result in a break of linearity deserving specific studies. For this analysis, there is no compartment where the artistic production resulting from American mestizaje could be placed. There is a gap in the history of artistic movements, which still does not contemplate these specificities."

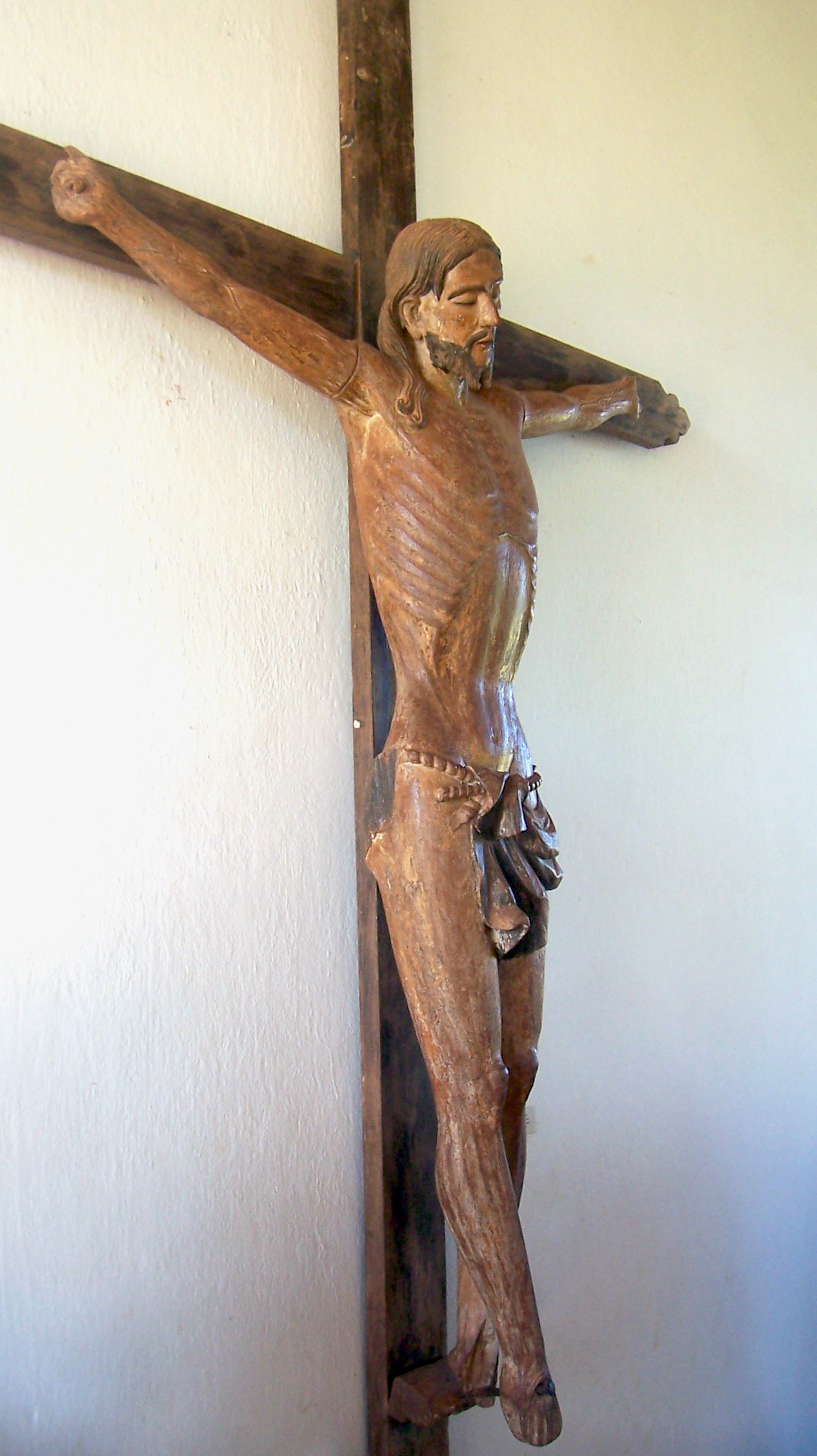
Crucifix, Missions Museum.

Boff identified a chronology and stated that the indigenous contribution to this production can be observed in its evolution, that is, in the marks of the different stages recognizable in it.

"Thus, in the first moment, in the learning phase, it would be possible to identify a strict imitation of European models. As technical mastery was achieved, and familiarity with the working tools became routine, the native imagination and the forms of their ancestral culture were subtly exposed... In this later phase, these elements are observed in the clothing, in the decorations, in the faces of the saints, in the way of working the hair, the cloak, the ornamentation of the head... This behavior establishes a phase of 'imitation' and another of "mestization"... The mestizaje phase would mark the sculptures with realistic interpretations and with "typically" missionary characteristics. Images such as that of Bishop Saint Nicholas and Saint John the Baptist are preserved in the Missions Museum. The carving is characterized by very simple forms, with the verticality of the clothes predominating. St. Nicholas has a cape with the same design as the petticoat of St. John the Baptist. The petticoat represents sheep skin, and the artist arrives at an almost geometric synthesis of the wool form. The bishop, in turn, bears on his cape the exact same design."

Armindo Trevisan presented an alternative analysis of this evolution:

"The remaining statuary can be divided into four groups: the works undoubtedly made by the European masters, those made by the Indians following canons dictated by the masters, mixed works, and Indian arts."

Besides the images of the saints, the Indians carved altarpieces, made musical instruments and furniture, executed paintings and other objects necessary for the liturgy. Each village specialized in manufacturing certain items. The settlement of St. John the Baptist, for example produced excellent musical instruments, and that of St. Nicholas was a center for the distribution of altarpieces and statues to neighboring towns. The most commonly used decorative motifs were the passion fruit flower, symbolizing Christ's passion; the palm of triumph, recalling Jesus' entry into Jerusalem; the vine, wine, and grape cluster, representations of the Redeemer's blood; the sunflower, a metaphor for the soul following the divine light, the thistle leaf, a symbol of penance, and many more. However, many native elements have been added, such as the artichoke leaf, country flowers, and fruits like apepu, and corn. In one image St. Michael is adorned by an Indian headdress; an Our Lady of the Conception, in place of the mantle and the halo on her head, she bears flowers. The precious adornments that accompanied the statuary, such as spears, palms, crowns, and others, have been lost, probably removed for their metal value, with the result that numerous samples of this vast production arrive to the present day mutilated.

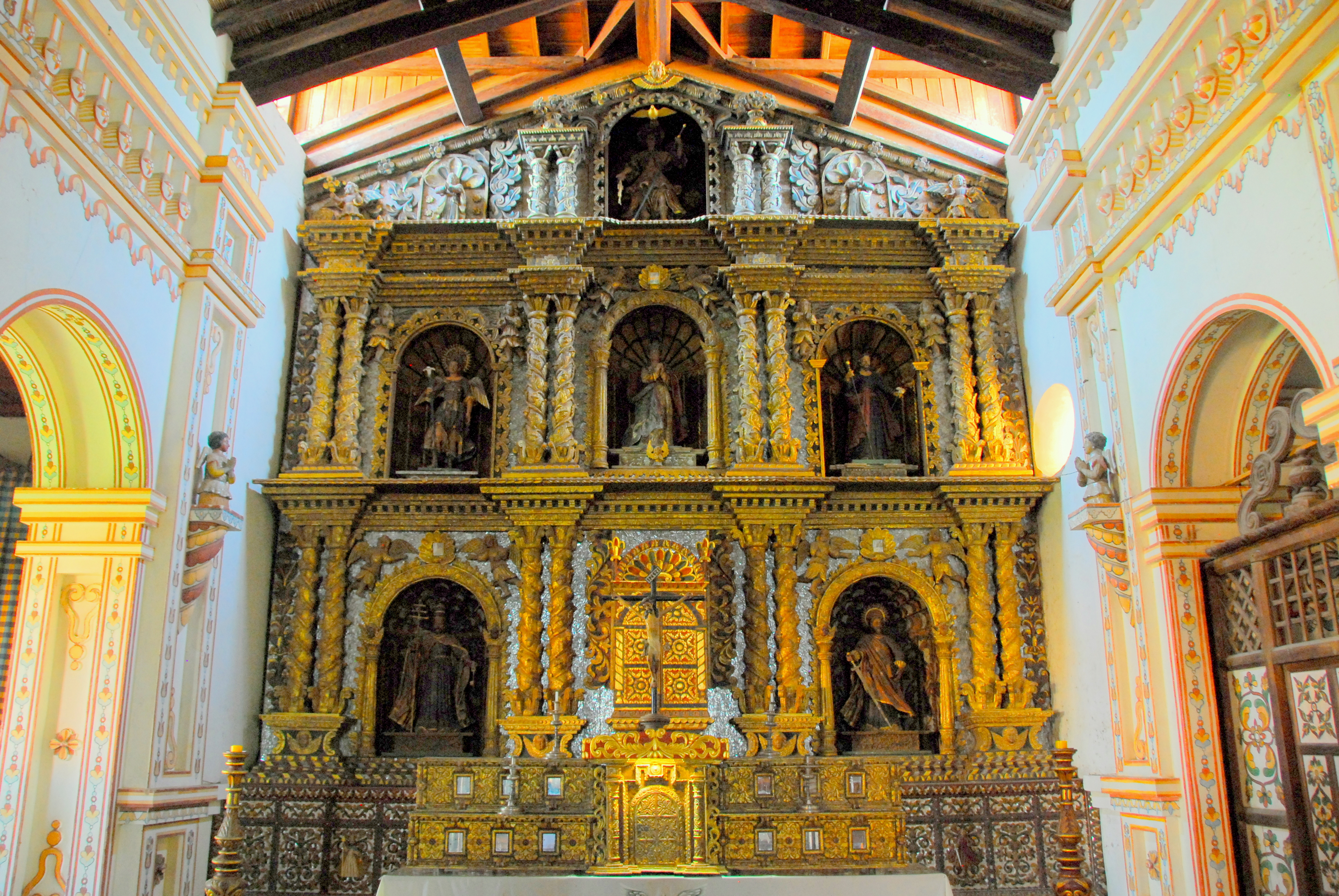
Altar of the San Rafael Velasco mission in Chiquitos.

An account of St. Michael's Church gives an idea of its early richness:

"There was a larger altarpiece with six images, plus one of Our Lady and a gilded Saint Michael; above the tabernacle, a painting of Our Lady, two little tables with images of Saint Michael, Saint Ignatius, Saint Raphael, Saint Gabriel, and Saint Anthony. Next to the gospel were two gilded altarpieces, and on another, also gilded St. Ignatius, St. Michael, and St. Roque. On another median altar, two images of Our Lady and one of St. Barbara, all gilded; on a small altar, the image of St. Isidro, gilded."

Nothing remains of the interior decoration of the Misiones Orientales churches in Rio Grande do Sul, even the buildings being in ruins. At the beginning of the 19th century, much was still visible. Among other travelers who described the missions in progressive abandonment, Saint-Hilaire, in his passage through the state in 1821, left an important written testimony about several settlements, already semi-deserted, but still with part of the structures in reasonable condition. Saint-Hilaire admired their grandeur and beauty. The weather and Men destroyed the remnants of the former ostentation. Much building material was reused when the area was recolonized by European/Brazilians throughout the 19th century. The sculptures that were saved ended up in other churches in the region or with private collectors. The most important and best-preserved site today is São Miguel, but its church is not typical of the missionary style, although being a majestic exception. In Sete Povos, according to reports, the predominant style must have been similar to that of the settlements of Chiquitos, in Bolivia, which have managed to reach the present day in an excellent state of preservation.

==== Miniatures ====
One field of missionary statuary that is still awaiting adequate studies is that of miniatures, since criticism has focused on large images for church decoration and participation in "official" functions. Miniatures, on the other hand, had a very specific insertion in religious community life and deserve a separate mention. Covering pieces ranging from 1.5 cm to 10 cm in height, the miniatures were intended mainly for private devotion. Many of them came from Europe and were private images of the traveling priests, who brought them as personal protection. But they also served as images for public worship in case of itinerant celebrations or when the settlement had not yet erected its church. Many others were certainly produced in the workshops of the Misiones Orientales themselves, for the same purposes, and also for the domestic and private cultivation of the Christian faith. Ahlert supposes that at least part of this production originated relatively far from the Jesuits' supervision and was created in the same residences by the Indian craftsmen on their days off, as they reveal a greater freedom and formal simplification in comparison to the large images. Others, according to Josefina Plá, must have appeared in the period immediately after the definitive withdrawal of the Jesuits and before the looting of the region by Fructuoso Rivera in 1828, done by remaining artisans. Although there is no documentary record of Indian artisans active in the region in the nineteenth century, oral history has preserved traditions that give another view of the subject. There are records that some miniatures were created to form nativity scenes, and there are still a few surviving in the Monsignor Estanislau Wolski Museum that seem to belong to this category. There are also reports that many miniatures were distributed among the Indians as prizes for some task accomplished or to the winners of games and competitions, given to warriors before battles for their protection, exchanged as gifts among the Indians. Every Guarani home had at least one small image, altar or portable chapel for family or individual devotion.

In Ahlert's summary,

"... the miniatures had a space and movement of their own. Unlike the images that composed the decoration of the churches, the miniatures extended their participation to the missionary daily life. They represented the presence of the saints in the intimacy of daily acts, in the realm of introspection, in the expression of faith outside the priest's gaze, in the space where simulation lost meaning and where personal belief, deposited in images loaded with significant symbolism, manifested itself in its own way."

=== Preferred icons ===
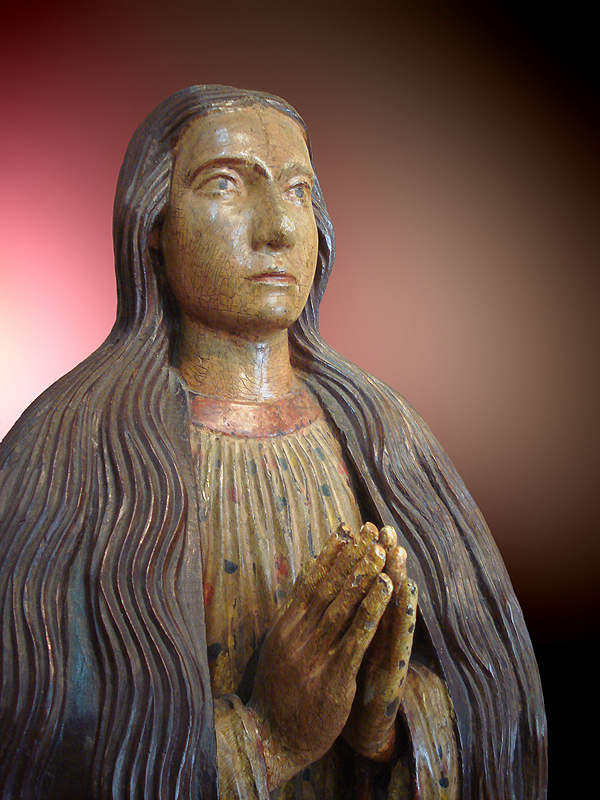
Immaculate Conception, Júlio de Castilhos Museum. Rare missionary zoomorphic bench, Júlio de Castilhos Museum.

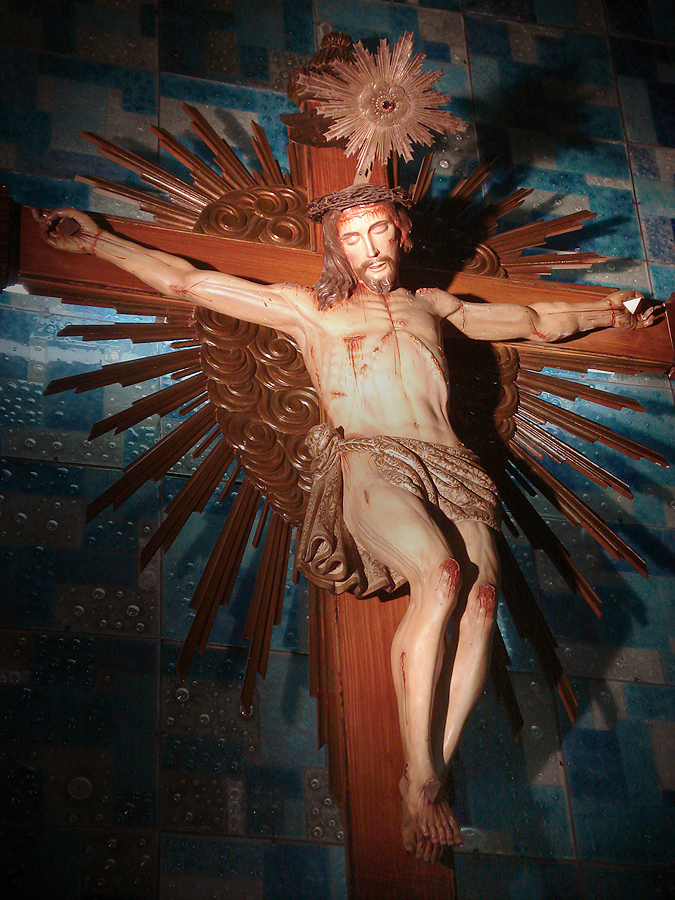
Crucifix, Bom Fim Chapel, authorship attributed to Brasanelli by Sustercic, repainted around 1888 by Serafim José Ribeiro.

The representations of the Virgin Mary were the most common in the Iberoamerican world, the most popular invocation being that of Immaculate Conception, as reported in the Ancient Letters of the Jesuits to their superiors. In them, they write about a multiplicity of activities that were related to the Virgin such as the recitation of the rosary, litanies, processions, feasts, hymns, formation of Marian congregations, pilgrimages, and novenas. Enhanced during the Counter-Reformation, veneration of the Virgin made her the supreme mediator of her devotees with God. The Virgin Mary was the first Christian icon to be integrated into the indigenous culture, through an iconography that represents her as a brunette woman. Isidore the Laborer, patron saint of Madrid, was another saint widely represented by the model of patience and work, having his image placed along the roads, in chapels and oratories, carried in procession, accompanied by prayers and songs in times of sowing and harvest. Within the most influential group, there is the image of St. Michael, represented as the commander of the heavenly militia, precipitating the evil angels into hell. Another representation of him is that of the judge: the archangel holds the scales that weigh souls. In many images, the saint fights the infernal dragon. Torelly supposes that in the missionary sculptures this dragon, part human, and part diabolical figure, could symbolize the bandeirante paulista, enemy and hunter of Indians.

In a general statistic, male images represent 46% of the catalogued collection, with saints Antonio, John Baptist, and Isidore the Laborer being the most common. The female images make up 20.8% of the collection, with Immaculate Conception being the most common. Angels add up to 15.4%, animals, 1.6%, 3.6% unidentified, and fragments with 12.5%.

=== Work methods and materials ===
Until the arrival of the colonizers, the natives, who lived in a stage of civilization equivalent to the Upper Paleolithic, did not know the technologies and instruments for the production of these objects. Guarani art was based on the repetition of traditional shapes, with a marked tendency to geometry and stylization, in body painting, basketry, and ceramics with therapeutic or religious functions. In the Misiones Orientales, the Indians began to work with materials and techniques that demanded more complex skills, such as the application of gold to the images and tailoring, using delicate and precise working tools. All these apparatus did not exist in their ancestral culture, which shows the impact of Christian iconology on the Guarani imagination, but also on the technical aspect of such impact. In the first phase of production, the Guarani craftsmen revealed themselves to be meticulous imitators of European models. Father Sepp admiringly recorded their imitative skill in the following terms:

"What they have seen only once, they can be convinced that they will imitate. They don't need a master at all, or leaders to show them and explain the rules of proportion, or even a teacher to explain the geometric foot. If you put any human figure or drawing in their hands, you will soon see a work of art executed, such as there can be no equal in Europe."

At the beginning of the creation of each settlement, the workshops functioned provisionally. After the church was built, they were organized in the inner courtyard, close to the priests' house. The ateliers were economic, administrative, and socially autonomous centers, but directly linked to the priests. They functioned as a corporation, following the example of the ancient medieval guilds, and enjoyed prestige and independence. The artisans became part of an indigenous elite, and the sculptor of statues of saints was also worthy of distinction as they handled sacred things. And by feeling valued for their work as craftsmen, the Indian facilitated the work of the evangelist.

Whoever showed aptitude and taste for the craft worked in the workshops. In the beginning, the orientation coming from the priests was indispensable, and it was necessary to teach the new craft techniques and familiarize the Indians with a new perception: to go from the two-dimensional plan to the three-dimensional plan. Over time, the most skilled Indians themselves instructed the others. The workshops also had several engravings and treatises on art and architecture, from which formal models for statuary were taken, an easy method of spreading Catholic iconography used throughout Colonial America. Many artworks were worked on collectively, according to the custom of the guilds. But it was always the master who made the head and hands, and determined the canon (the measure taken as a basis for the images). Other craftsmen could then take care of the "less important parts", according to their skill. No work was signed and women did not participate in the workshops, but performed other crafts.

The materials used in the sculptures were found in the region of the Misiones Orientales, such as urunday or quebracho, trees of excellent wood. For the images that were to be polychromatic and gilded, they used cedar and igary. The dyes were extracted from local plants or ores. From yerba mate, they made green, from urucum red, and yrybu retymá black. Stone was nearly not used in sculpture, only found in ornaments for walls, fountains and stonework facades, with sandstone being preferred. Although the paints, wood, and stone were found locally, it was necessary to import from Europe some powdered pigments, the gold and silver leaf, and the instruments for carving. Luersen, however, states that the production of the working instruments should also be part of the craft education given to the Indians, but that does not mean that many of these instruments were not quite rustic. This in turn would condition the carving technique itself, reflected in the more or less refined style of each piece.

== Legacy ==
The expulsion of the Jesuits prevented the missionary school of sculpture from continuing, and thus it did not produce artistic offspring. However, the iconographic collection that still exists of the Misiones Orientales is a documentary source of incalculable historical and artistic value, leaving a rich record of the cultural exchange between Indians and Europeans, and the impact of Western conceptions on the Indians. The result of this process, in the form of these statues, according to the view of several critics is a good representation of the originality of the multiform Hispanic-American Baroque.

For Trevisan, one of the scholars on the subject, it created "a Baroque different in certain aspects from the official Baroque... a Baroque that surprises, in the best images, by a certain intimate expression, melancholic, of placidity or singleness." On this, Beltrão & Fleig state that "in the missionary Baroque, only in the works recognized as Jesuit works, mainly by Brother Brasanelli...and in the indigenous sculptures copied from European models, do we find the contortions of pain and ecstasy. According to Boff, the response given by the Indians to the new type of life they were compelled to assume proved to be creative. If in the images that remain one notices a multiplicity of erudite influences, such as Romanesque, Gothic, Renaissance, and Baroque canons, next to them are visible clear artwork elements of the Guarani, for this very reason indicative of a new style by the original solutions they produced. The reaction of the lay public before these sculptures, in Batista Neto's account, has been one of admiration, mainly applauding the remarkable ability of the Indians to make them. However, the researcher mentions that before the artistic aspect, of greater interest to people, in general, comes the historical aspect.

The statuary of the Misiones Orientales has seen its prestige grow. Several specific critical studies have been devoted to it in recent years, and the culture of the Missions as a whole has been on the agenda of academics for quite some time. It had a section in the renowned exhibition Brasil Barroco, Entre Céu e Terra (1999/2000), in Paris, France, and in Brasil+500, Mostra do Redescobrimento (2000), in São Paulo, organized by the Fundação Bienal de São Paulo. The exhibitions were supplemented by critical publications that contributed to introducing new views on the subject. In Porto Alegre, the Rio Grande do Sul Museum of Art held a large and unprecedented gathering of the missionary collection in the gaucho capital at the same time, also launching a catalog with texts and photographs and then taking the exhibition to Buenos Aires. In 2006 IPHAN signed an agreement with the Andalusian Institute of Historical Heritage (from Spain), with the goal of conducting new prospects at the archaeological site of São Miguel and producing studies on missionary statuary, among other activities.

The missionary statuary is also one of the anchors of a movement to rescue and reread the history, identity, and folklore of that region, in part through the spontaneous impulse of the population, and in part stimulated by academics and official bodies, a movement in which the figure of the Indian is often magnified by the pride of a modern local culture strongly regionalist, which might try to compensate or, according to some, disguise, the state of abandonment and misery in which many of the last Guarani live today. At the archaeological site of São Miguel (the most important one), the presence of Guaranis selling their handicrafts in the vicinity of the Missions Museum is barely tolerated by the staff, and there is no official initiative to integrate them into the micro-economy of the area. On the other hand, there are already projects in Santo Ângelo to use the historical and artistic richness of the Misiones Orientales as a starting point to stimulate the production of artworks inspired by them, and in 2004 the Ministry of Culture launched the program Identification, Protection, and Valorization of the Cultural References of the Mbyá-Guarani in Brazil, followed in 2007 by the book Tava Miri São Miguel Arcanjo, Sacred Stone Village: the Mbyá-Guarani in the Missions, with which the recognition of the connection between the material relics of the settlements and the present-day Guarani was consolidated, strengthening their ethnic identity and their integration into Brazilian society. The Indians, moreover, in the daily life of their villages, make many references to the legacy of their missionary ancestors. The images also foster regional tourism, even though the region's infrastructure is currently too precarious to expand this sector, but there are already itineraries especially geared towards visiting places where statues of the Seven Peoples are preserved.

Although the ruins of São Miguel are now a World Heritage Site, (the topic of the Misiones Orientales has already received wide media coverage and generated preservation interest by the population) and the missionary statuary is listed as a national heritage site by IPHAN, it is not free from danger. About half of the known pieces are privately owned, which often hinders official preservation efforts. A considerable part of these works does not receive the proper technical care to keep them in good condition and are subject to inadequate storage, handling, and exhibition. Others disappear without a trace. Many images may have fallen into the black market for antiques, given their high value. An example of the consequences of ignorance about this heritage was the case of the minister of the Universal Church of the Kingdom of God Fábio Guimarães da Silva Pereira, who during a service in 2007 burned two images registered by IPHAN that belonged to private individuals, claiming that the burning of images is a common practice in Universal services. But he assured that he did not know that they, one of the Dead Lord and another of Saint Peter, were protected.

Finally, it is necessary to remember that despite its undeniable cultural and historical importance, the missionary initiative as a whole is the object of much controversy and is not exempt from criticism, as it is the art produced in its midst. Much has been said about the authoritarian character of the missions, and the process of forced acculturation to which the Indians were subjected is condemned. Although in general, the missionaries recognized the Indians' inclination towards art, especially music, and their talent for imitation, it is also alleged that the priests were insensitive and misunderstood the essence and value of the Indian way of life and thought. This is corroborated by reports from the Jesuits themselves, who often described the natives in very derogatory words. For Father Altamirano, the Indian was "the most singular and indomitable animal that God had put in the world"; for Father Cardiel "the less stupid Indians had only brief intervals of conscience", and the famous Father Sepp did not do any less, saying that they were "stupid, dumb, very dumb in all spiritual matters". It took time for the silvícolas to be recognized by the Church as beings endowed with reason and able to receive the Sacraments. For these reasons, because of their aesthetic canons, symbolic meanings, and craft techniques imposed by the Europeans, for many authors, missionary sculpture, in general, has neither a style of its own nor a superlative artistic quality. Therefore, it should not be considered, as others do, an original priest-Indian co-production. For those, missionary sculpture is only a mechanical imitation, more or less successful, of erudite European toreutics, showing nothing or very little of authentic native originality, being often a very crude imitation of its models.

== See also ==
- Baroque
- Baroque sculpture
- Brazilian sculpture
- Jesuit missions among the Guaraní
- Mission Museum
- Júlio de Castilhos Museum

== Bibliography ==
- Aguirre, Indalecio Liévano (2002). Los grandes conflictos sociales y económicos de nuestra historia (in Spanish). Intermedio Editores.
- Ahlert, Jaqueline (2008). O Acervo de Miniaturas Missioneiras: Museu Monsenhor Estanislau Wolski. Revista Mouseion.
- Bachettini, Andréa Lacerda (2002). "A imaginária missioneira do Rio Grande do Sul" (PDF). Anais do XI Congresso da ABRACOR. Rio de Janeiro.
- Baptista; Bauer, Letícia; Presa, Alejandra (2006). "As Ruínas e seus Personagens no Século XIX". Biblos (20).
- Batista Neto, João. Recepção Estética e Turismo nas Ruínas Jesuíticas de São Miguel Arcanjo (PDF). Laboratório de Estudos em Psicologia da Arte, USP. Archived from the original (PDF) on 2015-12-23.
- Bauer, Leticia (2007). "O Arquiteto e o Zelador: Patrimônio Cultural, História e Memória". Nuevo Mundo Mundos Nuevos. doi:10.4000/nuevomundo.3807.
- Beltrão, Conceição; Fleig, Mario (2001). "Barroco missioneiro: traços que inventam o Brasil". Association Lacanienne Internationale. Archived from the original on 2007-10-25.
- Ben, Clarice Pinto (2009). "O Museu de Arte como Pedagogia Cultural". Anais do 18º Encontro da Associação Nacional de Pesquisadores em Artes Plásticas: Transversalidades nas Artes Visuais (21). Salvador, Bahia.
- Biesek, Ana Solange (2004), "Turismo e Interpretação do Patrimônio Cultural. São Miguel das Missões - Rio Grande do Sul - Brasil", Dissertação de Mestrado em Turismo, Caxias do Sul: UCS
- Boff, Claudete (2002), A Imaginária Guarani: O Acervo do Museu das Missões, São Leopoldo: UNISINOS
- Boff, Claudete, "Persuadir ou Deixar-se Persuadir: a Produção Artística dos Povoados Missioneiros do Sul do Brasil", Pindorama, Cadernos de Pesquisa do Laboratório de Estudos e Pesquisa em Arte Colonial (LEPAC) da Universidade Federal do Rio Grande do Sul, archived from the original on 2009-02-28
- Carrilho, Marcos José (2006). "A Transparência do Museu das Missões". Vitruvius.
- Castelknau-L'Estoile, Charlotte de. (2006). "The Uses of Shamanism: evangelizing strategies and missionary models in seventeenth-century Brazil". O'Malley, John W. Et Alii (Eds). The Jesuits II: Cultures, Sciences, and the Arts, 1540-1773. University of Toronto Press.
- Colvero, Ronaldo B; Maurer, Rodrigo Ferreira (2009). "São Borja e seu Patrimônio 'quase' Esquecido: O Caso das Missões Jesuíticas na Terra dos Presidentes". Documentos do IV Congresso Nacional de História. Maringá.
- Corsi, Elisabetta (2008). "Introducción: El Debate Actual Sobre el Relativismo y la Producción de Saberes en las Misiones Católicas Durante la Primera Edad Moderna: ¿Una Lección Para el Presente?". El Debate Actual sobre el Relativismo y la Producción de Saberes en las Misiones Católicas durante la Primera Edad Moderna: una lección para el presente?. Ideas para una historia misionera de los espacios coloniales. Órdenes Religiosas entre América y Asia: Ideas para una historia misionera de los espacios coloniales. El Colegio de Mexico AC. pp. 17–54. doi:10.2307/j.ctv3f8q2w.5. ISBN 978-968-12-1354-1.
- Custódio, Luiz Antonio Bolcato. "Missões Jesuíticas: Arquitetura e Urbanismo". Cadernos de História (21). Memorial do Rio Grande do Sul.
- Damasceno, Athos (1970). Artes Plásticas no Rio Grande do Sul (in Portuguese). Porto Alegre: Globo.
- Tua, Sandro Negro (2005). "Función Religiosa, Social y Cultural de las Haciendas Misionales en la Orinoquia". Esclavitud, economía y evangelización: las haciendas jesuitas en la América virreinal (in Spanish). Fondo Editorial Pontifícia Universidad Católica del Perú.
- Fleck, Eliane Cristina Deckmann (1999). "As Reduções Jesuítico-Guaranis na Perspectiva da História das Mentalidades". Un reino en la frontera: las misiones jesuitas en la América colonial (in Spanish). Fondo Editorial Pontifícia Universidad Católica del Perú.
- Flores, Moacyr. "Guerras e conflitos no Rio Grande do Sul" (PDF). Cadernos de Cultura (38). Memorial do Rio Grande do Sul. Archived from the original (PDF) on 2011-05-20.
- Gómez, Fernando (1999). "Jesuit Proposals for a Regulated Society in a Colonial World: the cases of Antonio Ruiz de Montoya and Antonio Vieira". Un reino en la frontera: las misiones jesuitas en la América colonial (in Spanish). Fondo Editorial Pontifícia Universidad Católica del Perú.
- Hatfield, María Fabiola Rodríguez (2007). Misiones Jesuitas de Chiquitos: La utopía del reino de Dios en la tierra (in Spanish). Universitat Politècnica de Catalunya.
- Huonder, A (1911). "Reductions of Paraguay". The Catholic Encyclopedia. New York: Robert Appleton Company.
- Kennedy, T (1911). "Catholic Missions". The Catholic Encyclopedia. New York: Robert Appleton Company.
- Kern, Arno Alvarez (2006). "Missões, História e Arqueologia: frentes de colonização, contatos interétnicos, intercâmbios culturais". Revista da Sociedade Brasileira de Pesquisa Histórica.
- Labouche. "As Missões Guaraníticas: a formação de uma Cristandade". Revista Permanência online.
- Losekann, Silvana (2009). "Os ladrões do invisível". Defender - Defesa Civil do Patrimônio Histórico.
- Luersen, Paula (2009). "Originalidade do Barroco no Brasil pela Transposição de Materiais e Técnicas". 8º Seminário de História da Arte. Pelotas: UFPel.
- Maldi, Denise (1997). "De confederados a bárbaros: a representação da territorialidade e da fronteira indígenas nos séculos XVIII e XIX". Revista de Antropologia. 40 (2). doi:10.1590/S0034-77011997000200006.
- Maestri, Mário (2006). "Os Sete Povos Missioneiros: Das Fazendas Coletivas ao Latifúndio Pastoril Rio-Grandense". Revista Espaço Acadêmico (58). Archived from the original on 2010-12-31.
- Martínez, José Luiz; Gallardo, Viviana; Martínez, Nelson (2002). Boccara, Guillaume (ed.). "Colonización, resistencia y mestizaje en las Américas (siglos XVI-XX)". Travaux de l'Institut français. 148. Construyendo identidades desde el poder: los índios en los discursos republicanos de inicios del siglo XIX.
- Martins, Maria Cristina Bohn (1999). "Tempo, Festa e Espaço na Redução dos Guarani". In Tua, Sandra Negro; Marzal, Manuel María (eds.). Un reino en la frontera: las misiones jesuitas en la América colonial (in Spanish). Fondo Editorial Pontifícia Universidad Católica del Perú.
- Marzal, Manuel M (1999). "Las Misiones Jesuitas, una Utopia Posible?". In Tua, Sandra Negro; Marzal, Manuel María (eds.). Un reino en la frontera: las misiones jesuitas en la América colonial (in Spanish). Fondo Editorial Pontifícia Universidad Católica del Perú.
- Marzal, Manuel María (2002). Tierra encantada: tratado de antropología religiosa de América Latina (in Spanish). Colección Estructuras y procesos. Fondo Editorial PUCP.
- Marzal, Manuel María; Tua, Sandra Negro (2005). Esclavitud, economía y evangelización: las haciendas jesuitas en la América virreinal (in Spanish). Fondo Editorial Pontifícia Universidad Católica del Perú.
- Moraes, Carlos Eduardo Neves de (2009). "Os Mbyá-Guarani e as Missões Jesuíticas no Brasil: outra história". VIII Reunião de Antropologia do Mercosul "Diversidade e Poder na América Latina. Buenos Aires.
- Mörner, Magnus (2006). "The Role of the Jesuits in the Transfer of Secular Baroque Culture to the Río de la Plata Region". In O'Malley, John W. (ed.). The Jesuits: cultures, sciences, and the arts, 1540-1773. University of Toronto Press.
- S.J., Urbano, Navarrete. "Prefazione". In Dhavamony, Mariasusai (ed.). Prospettive di missiologia, oggi (in Italian). Vol. 16. Documenta missionalia. Editrice Pontificia Università Gregoriana.
- Oliveira, Lizete Dias de (2007). "A Comunicação através da Arte na Província Jesuítica do Paraguai". Habitus. 5 (1). Archived from the original on 2016-03-08.
- Ortiz, Victor Hugo Limpias (2005). "Misiones de Moxos: Arquitectura religiosa, residencial e industrial. La construción de un urbanismo productivo en el corazón sudamericano". In Tua, Sandra Negro; Marzal, Manuel María (eds.). Esclavitud, economía y evangelización: las haciendas jesuitas en la América virreinal (in Spanish). Fondo Editorial Pontifícia Universidad Católica del Perú.
- Pinto, Luís Flodoardo Silva. (2002). As missões orientais: epopéia jesuítica no sul do Brasil (in Portuguese). Editora AGE Ltda.Pinto, Muriel (2010). "Primeiro dos Sete Povos das Missões, a Terra dos Presidentes: uma análise das políticas e representações do patrimônio na cidade natal de Getúlio Vargas". Patrimônio e Memória. 6 (2).
- Pommer, Roselene Moreira Gomes (2008). "Missioneirismo: a produção de uma identidade regional". Tese de Doutorado em História. São Leopoldo: UNISINOS.
- Reff, Daniel T. (2005). Plagues, priests, and demons: sacred narratives and the rise of Christianity in the Old World and the New. Cambridge University Press.
- Rocha; Nico (2000). "Missões". MARGS/Design SA. Porto Alegre.
- Saint-Hilaire, Auguste de (2002). Viagem ao Rio Grande do Sul. Porto Alegre: Martins Livreiro.
- Schallenberger, Erneldo (2007). Estudos missioneiros: Temas e abordagens (PDF). Porto: Centro Interuniversitário de História da Espiritualidade.
- Sevcenko, Nicolau (2000). Pindorama revisitada: cultura e sociedade em tempos de virada. Brasil cidadão. Editora Peirópolis.
- Sustersic, Bozidar (2001). "El "Insigne Artífice" José Brasanelli. Su Participación en la Conformación de um Nuevo Lenguaje Figurativo en las Misiones Jesuítico-Guaraníes" (PDF). Actas del III Congreso Actas del III Congreso Internacional del Barroco Americano: Territorio, Arte, Espacio y Sociedad. Seville: Universidade Pablo de Olavide. Archived from the original (PDF) on 2010-10-26.
- Sweet, David (1992). "Misioneros Jesuitas y Índios 'Recalcitrantes' en la Amazonia Colonial". In Portilla, Miguel León (ed.). De palabra y obra en el nuevo mundo. Vol. 1: Antropología y etnología. Siglo XXI de España Editores.
- Torres, Luiz Henrique (1997). "Historiografia Sul-Riograndense: O Lugar das Missões Jesuíticos-Guarani na Formação Histórica do Rio Grande do Sul (1819-1975)". Tese de Doutorado em História. Porto Alegre: PUC-RS.
- Trevisan, Armindo (1978). A Escultura dos Sete Povos. Porto Alegre: Movimento/IEL/INL.
- Gomes, Paulo (2007). "O Rosto Indígena das Missões". Artes Plásticas no Rio Grande do Sul (in Portuguese). Porto Alegre: Lahtu Sensu.
