= Jardim Lindoia =

Neighborhood in Porto Alegre, Brazil

Coordinates: 30°00′14″S 51°09′05″W

Jardim Lindoia is a neighbourhood (bairro) in the city of Porto Alegre, the state capital of Rio Grande do Sul, in Brazil. It was created by Law 2022 from December 7, 1959.

In 1945, Arno Friedrich started to divide his large property in Jardim Lindoia into many lots. According to the chronicler Ary Veiga Sanhudo, the name of the neighbourhood was chosen by Friedrich to make a tribute to "Lindoia", the heroine from "O Uraguai", by José Basílio da Gama. The word means "beautiful" in Guarani language.

Jardim Lindoia is a middle class residential neighbourhood in Porto Alegre.
