= Sepé Tiaraju =

Guarani leader and Servant of God

Servant of God Sepé Tiaraju
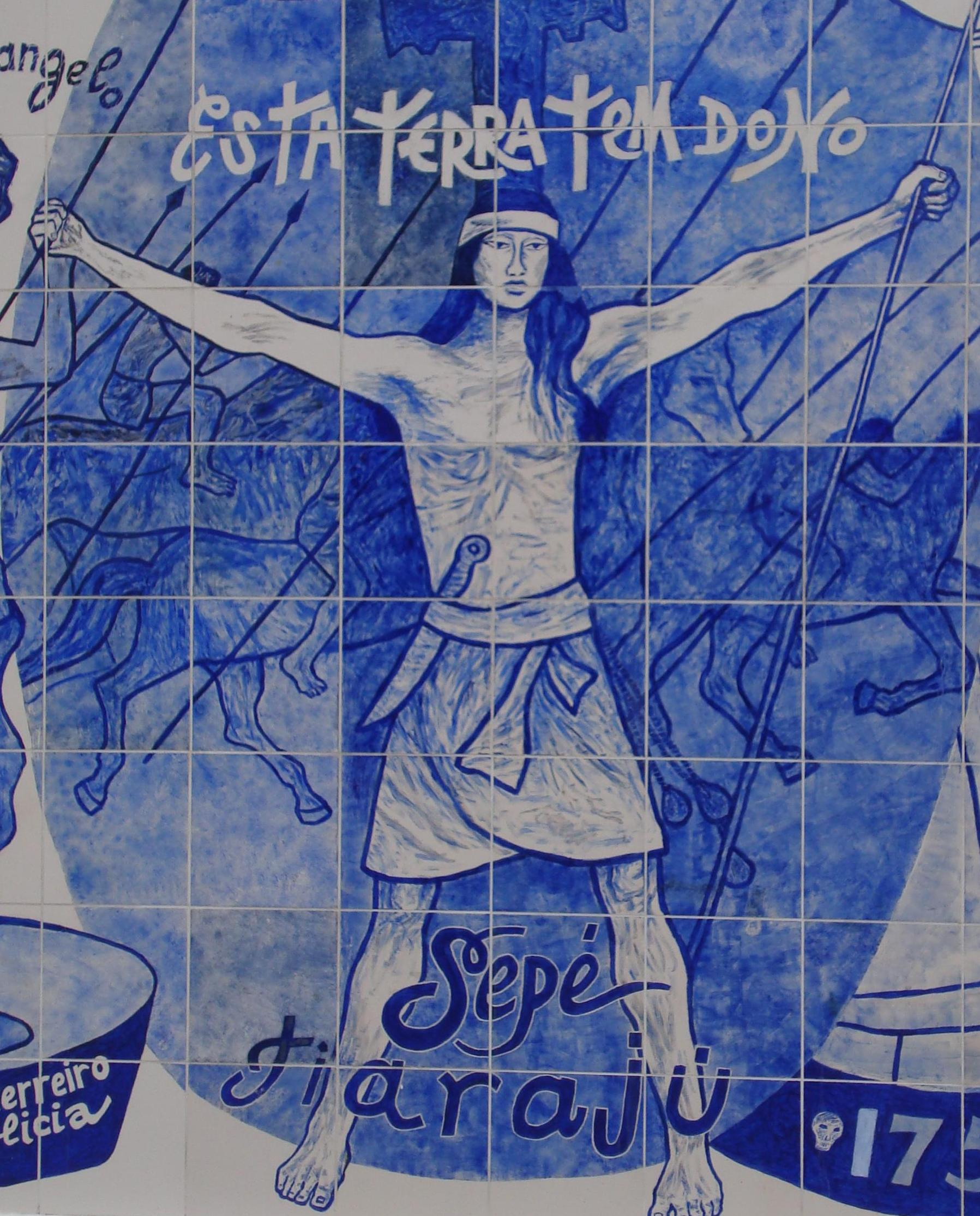
- Sepé Tiaraju by Danúbio Gonçalves
- Born: José Tiarayú c. 1723; São Luiz Gonzaga, Rio Grande do Sul, Brazil
- Died: 7 February 1756 (aged 33); São Gabriel, Rio Grande do Sul, Brazil
- Venerated in: Catholic Church; Folk Catholicism
- Patronage: São Sepé

Sepé Tiaraju (c. 1723 – 7 February 1756) was a Guaraní leader in the Jesuit reduction mission of São Luiz Gonzaga.

== Advocacy and death ==
Sepé Tiaraju led the fight against the Portuguese and Spanish colonial powers in the Guerras Guaraníticas (Guarani War) and was killed three days before a massacre that killed around fifteen hundred of his fellow soldiers. After 250 years of the date of his death he still remains a very influential figure in the popular imagination and a folk saint in Rio Grande do Sul.

This conflict in South America resulted from the land demarcations established by the European powers with the Tratado de Madrid (1750). According to this treaty the Guarani population inhabiting the Jesuit missions in the region had to be evacuated. After one hundred and fifty years living a unique communal life, neither the prospect of returning to the forests nor moving to another place were considered as options by most mission Guaranis. Further treaties such as the San Idelfonso Treaty (1777) and the Badajoz Treaty (1801) still grappled with issues related to this topic.

The Christianized Guarani population residing in the Jesuit missions (called missões or reduções, in Portuguese), that is in Brazil, Paraguay and Argentina combined, is estimated to have numbered approximately eighty thousand at the start of the conflict. At that time these so-called evangelized Guaranis – as opposed to the many Guaranis living the traditional way and not in the Jesuit missions – raised what is believed to have been the largest herd of cattle in all of Latin America. Therefore, the Europeans' interests in the area extended beyond land appropriations.

== Legacy ==
Sepé Tiaraju was immortalized in the letters by Brazilian writer Basílio da Gama in the epic poem O Uraguai (1769) and in the poem O Lunar de Sepé, collected by Simões Lopes Neto and published in the beginning of the 20th century. Since then, he has been a character in many major literary works, like O tempo e o vento ["The time and the wind"], by Erico Verissimo. The expression and battle cry Esta terra tem dono!, sometimes quoted in Guarani Co ivi oguerecó iara ("This land has owners!" in English), is attributed to Sepé Tiaraju.

Sepé Tiaraju Airport, in Santo Ângelo, Rio Grande do Sul, Brazil is named after Sepé Tiaraju.

The idea of initialising a beatification process for Sepé Tiaraju emerged in the 1970s. In 2018, the Catholic Church started the process of beatification, declaring Sepé a Servant of God.
