= Guaraní War =

1756 conflict in South America

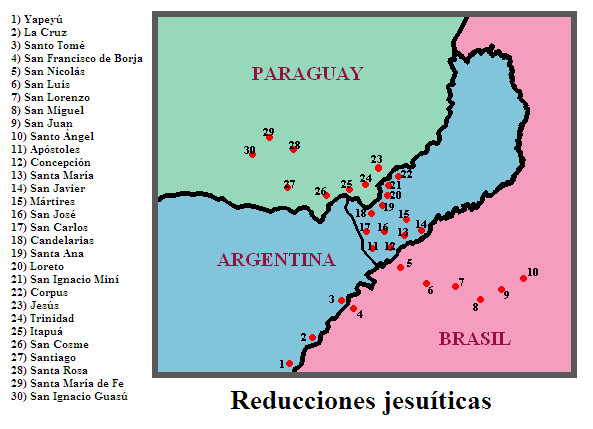
- Location of the most important Jesuit missions, with current borders
Date	July 1754 – February 1756
Location	Misiones Orientales, South America (present-day Argentina, Brazil and Paraguay)
Result	Portuguese–Spanish victory
Territorial changes	Fall of the Seven Missions and end of Guaraní autonomy

Belligerents
Portugal; Spain	Guaraní tribes

Commanders and leaders
Gomes Freire; José de Andonaegui	Sepé Tiaraju †; Nicolás Ñeengirú

Strength
First campaign: 1,000 Portuguese; 2,000 Spaniards; Second campaign: 1,200 Portuguese; 1,600 Spaniards	First campaign: Unknown; Second campaign: 1,680, later reinforced to nearly twice that

Casualties and losses
- 16,000 Guaraní killed or displaced

The Guaraní War (Spanish: Guerra Guaranítica, Portuguese: Guerra Guaranítica; literally, Guaranitic War) of 1756, also called the War of the Seven Reductions, took place between the Guaraní tribes of seven Jesuit Missions and joint Spanish-Portuguese forces. It was a result of the 1750 Treaty of Madrid, which set a line of demarcation between Spanish and Portuguese colonial territory in South America.

The boundary drawn up between the two nations was the Uruguay River, with Portugal possessing the land east of the river. The seven Jesuit missions east of the Uruguay River, known as the Misiones Orientales, were to be dismantled and relocated on the Spanish western side of the river. The seven missions were called San Miguel, Santo Ángel, San Lorenzo Martir, San Nicolás, San Juan Bautista, San Luis Gonzaga, and San Francisco de Borja. These missions were some of the most populous in South America with 26,362 inhabitants, according to a Jesuit census, and many more in the surrounding areas.

In 1754 the Jesuits surrendered control of the missions, but the Guaraní peoples, led by Sepé Tiaraju, refused to comply with the order to relocate. Efforts by the Spanish army in 1754 to forcefully remove the Guaraní from the missions failed. On 10 February 1756, a combined force of 3,000 Spanish and Portuguese soldiers fought the Guaraní at the battle of Caiboaté. It resulted in the death of 1,511 Guaraní, while the Europeans suffered only four deaths. In the aftermath of the battle, the Spanish-Portuguese army occupied the seven missions.

Eventually, Spain and Portugal annulled the 1750 treaty in the Treaty of El Pardo (1761), with Spain regaining control over the seven missions and its surrounding territory.

== Background ==
The Jesuit missions were established in the early 17th century by Spanish Jesuit missionaries. For most of the history of the missions, the Guaraní fought against Luso-Brazilian slavers and explorers known as bandeirantes who sought to capture the Guaraní to sell them in Brazil. The Guaraní were levied to fight for Spain in several colonial conflicts against the Portuguese. The Treaty of Madrid was signed in 1750 to end an ongoing colonial border conflict between Spain and Portugal. The treaty ceded the outpost of Colonia del Sacramento to Spain and set the border between the two colonial empires as the Uruguay River. This new border ceded significant land to Portugal, including seven Jesuit Reductions. The Guaraní living in the seven mission settlements refused to move out of the lands that were ceded to Portugal, or to accept Portuguese rule.

== Conflict ==
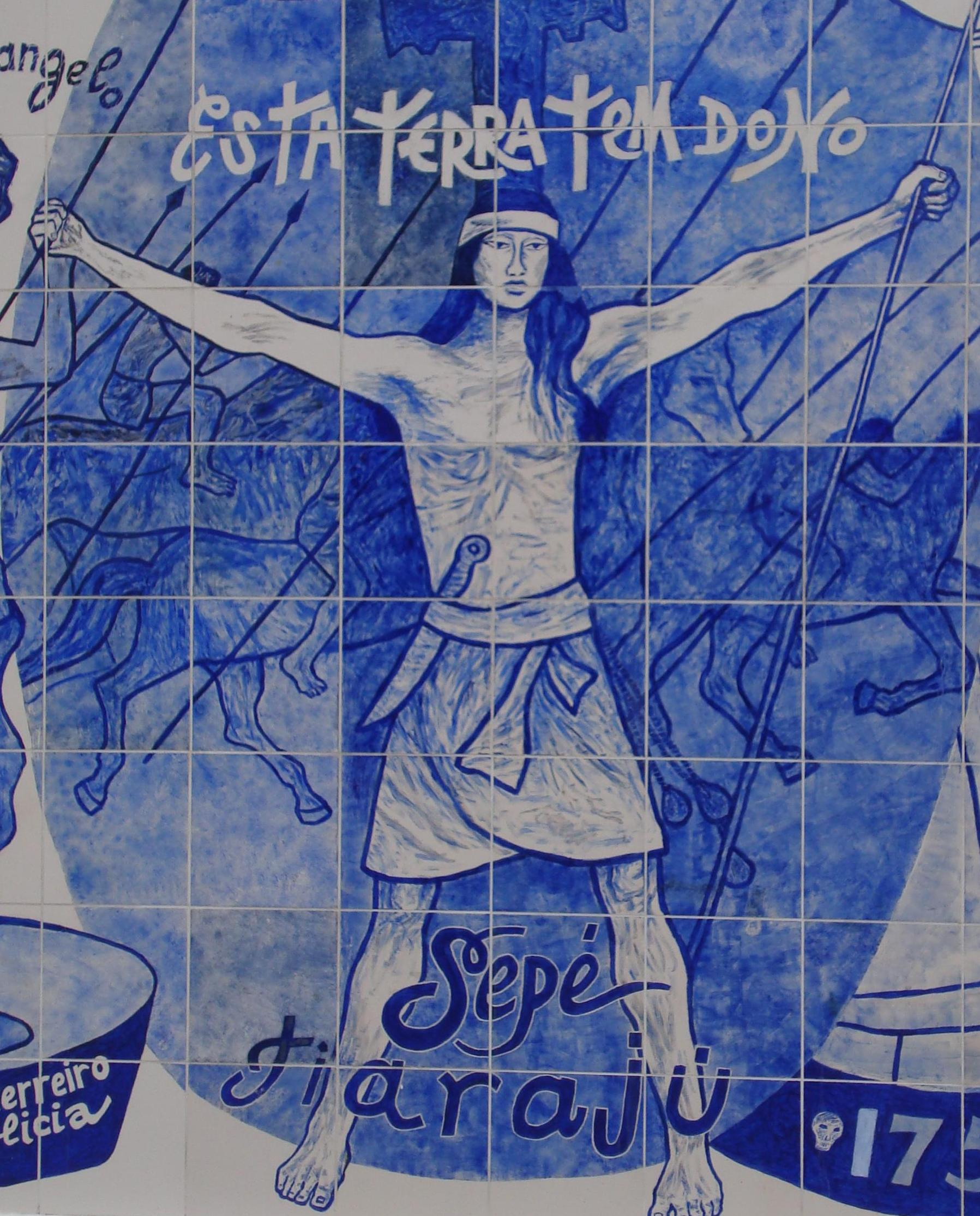
Modern depiction of Sepé Tiaraju, the leader of the Guaraní rebels, in the Rio Grande do Sul Epic Memorial, at the entrance of the Mercado Station of the Porto Alegre Metro

In July 1754, Spanish and Portuguese military forces were dispatched to force the Guaraní to leave the area. There was inconclusive fighting throughout 1754 between Guaraní rebels under Sepé Tiaraju and the combined Portuguese and Spanish forces commanded by Gomes Freire de Andrade. By the end of 1754 an armistice was signed between the Guaraní and the Spanish and Portuguese forces.

Hostilities resumed in 1756 when an army of 3,000 Spanish, Portuguese, and native auxiliary soldiers under José de Andonaegui and Freire de Andrade was sent to subdue the Guaraní rebels. On 7 February 1756, Sepé Tiaraju was killed in a skirmish with Spanish and Portuguese troops. Three days later, the Guaraní were defeated at the battle of Caiboaté. 1,511 Guaraní were killed and 152 taken prisoner, while 4 Spanish and Portuguese were killed and about 30 were wounded. Following the defeat of the Guaraní, the Jesuit missions were occupied by Spanish and Portuguese forces.

== Aftermath ==
After the defeat of the Guaraní rebels, the Spanish and Portuguese forced the Guaraní to abandon the seven missions that had been ceded to Portugal in the Treaty of Madrid and to move to Spanish controlled lands. According to a census conducted in 1756, the Guaraní population from the seven missions was 14,284, which was about 15,000 less than the population in 1750. The former Jesuit missions were occupied by the Portuguese until 1759 when Spain unilaterally ended the Treaty of Madrid and reclaimed the lands of the seven missions. The border of the La Plata colonial region was finalized by the Treaty of San Ildefonso in 1777.

== In popular culture ==
- The 1759 novel Candide by Voltaire features the titular character's run-in with both the Portuguese and Jesuits during the Guaraní War.
- The 1769 epic poem O Uraguai by Basílio da Gama is set at the end of the war.
- The 1986 film The Mission is loosely based on the events.
