= Treaty of El Pardo (1761) =

1761 treaty between Spain and Portugal

The Treaty of El Pardo was signed on 12 February 1761 between representatives of the Spanish Empire and Portuguese Empire.

Based on the terms of the treaty, all aspects of the Treaty of Madrid in 1750 were repealed. The reasons for this were the difficulties encountered in the 1750s to establish a clear border between the Spanish and Portuguese new South American possessions in such an enormous undeveloped area.

After both the Guarani War of 1756 and the accession to the throne of King Charles III of Spain in 1759, the Spanish king had decided that a general revision of the treaties made with Portugal was necessary.

== See also ==
- List of treaties
