= Júlio de Castilhos Museum =

Museum in Porto Alegre, Brazil

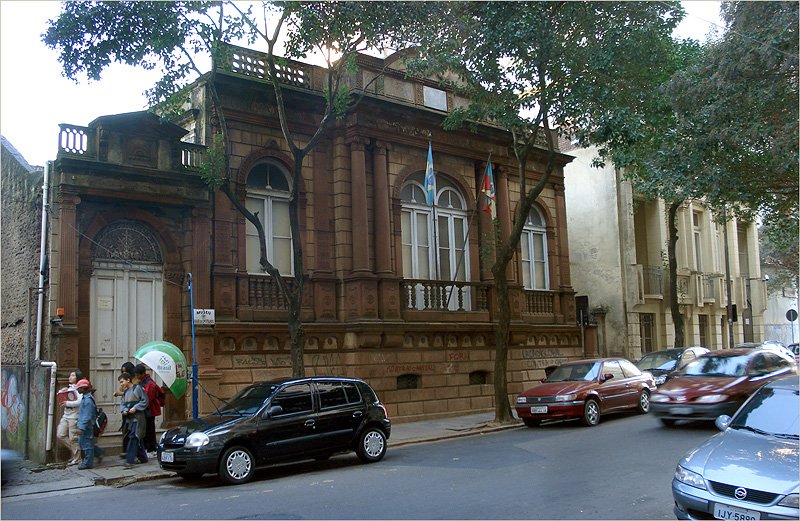
- Júlio de Castilhos Museum
- Location: Porto Alegre, Rio Grande do Sul, Brazil
- Coordinates: 30.0336°S 51.2292°W
- Type: Local museum
- Collection size: 10,000+ pieces
- Website: museujuliodecastilhos.rs.gov.br

Júlio de Castilhos Museum (Portuguese: Museu Júlio de Castilhos) is a museum located in the city of Porto Alegre (Rio Grande do Sul, Brazil). It is the oldest museum in Rio Grande do Sul state.

== Collection ==
Its collection, over 10 thousand pieces, is Brazilian national heritage, and comprises objects of historical, artistic, ethnographic and archaeological character, mostly related to the history of Rio Grande do Sul. Its sections for the Ragamuffin War and the Paraguayan War are specially rich. The museum also preserves a few but very important examples of sculptures produced within Indian Reductions by Jesuits and indigenous peoples.

In September 2023, a flood damaged a number of the museum's collections. 150 works were restored in the following year.

== Historic district controversy ==
In 2025, a court suspended the planned construction of a 40-story building next to the museum, citing that it would likely damage the building. In response, mayor Sebastião Melo signed a decree to the Law for the Rehabilitation of the Historic Center, updating the regulation. In July 2025, the Association of Friends of the Julio de Castilhos Museum has proposed a lawsuit against the city of Porto Alegre to prevent the building's construction.

== Gallery ==
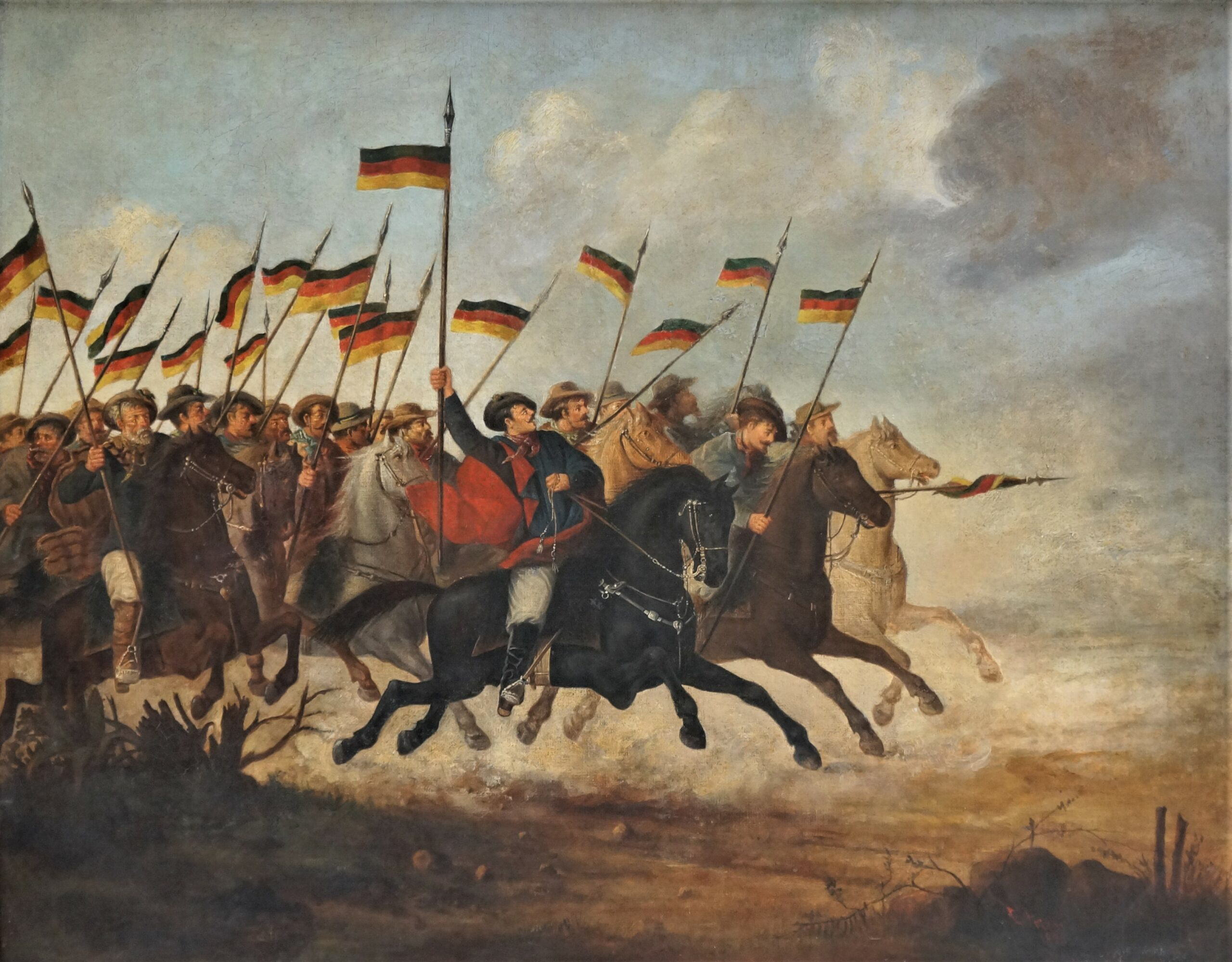
Charge of the Cavalry (Farroupilha army in the Ragamuffin War), by Guilherme Litran

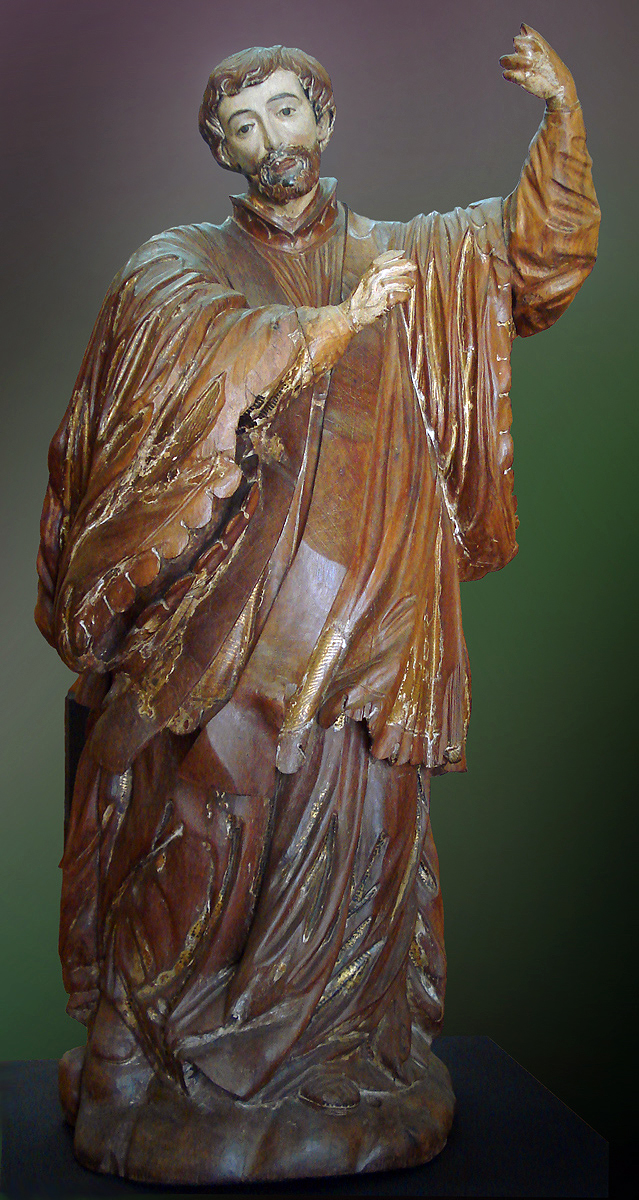
St. Francis Xavier, 18th century

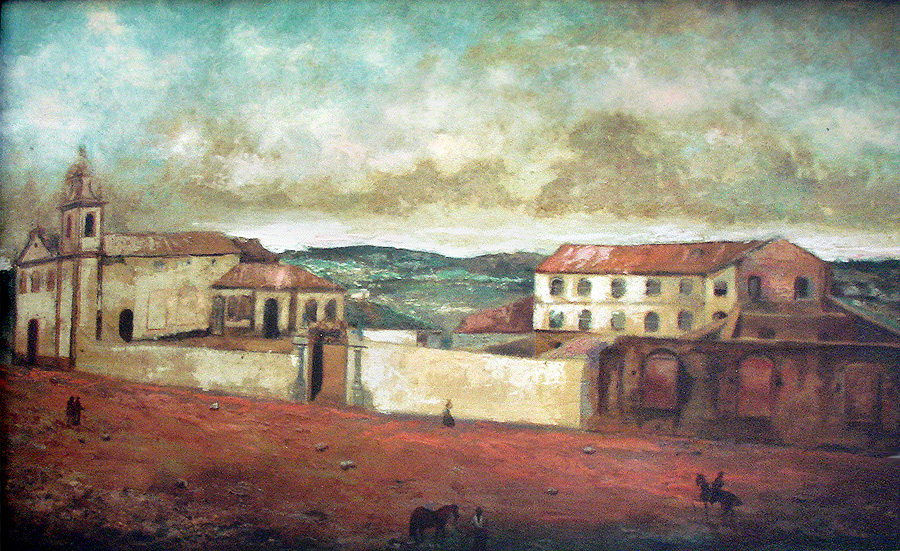
Santa Casa de Misericórdia of Porto Alegre, mid-19th century

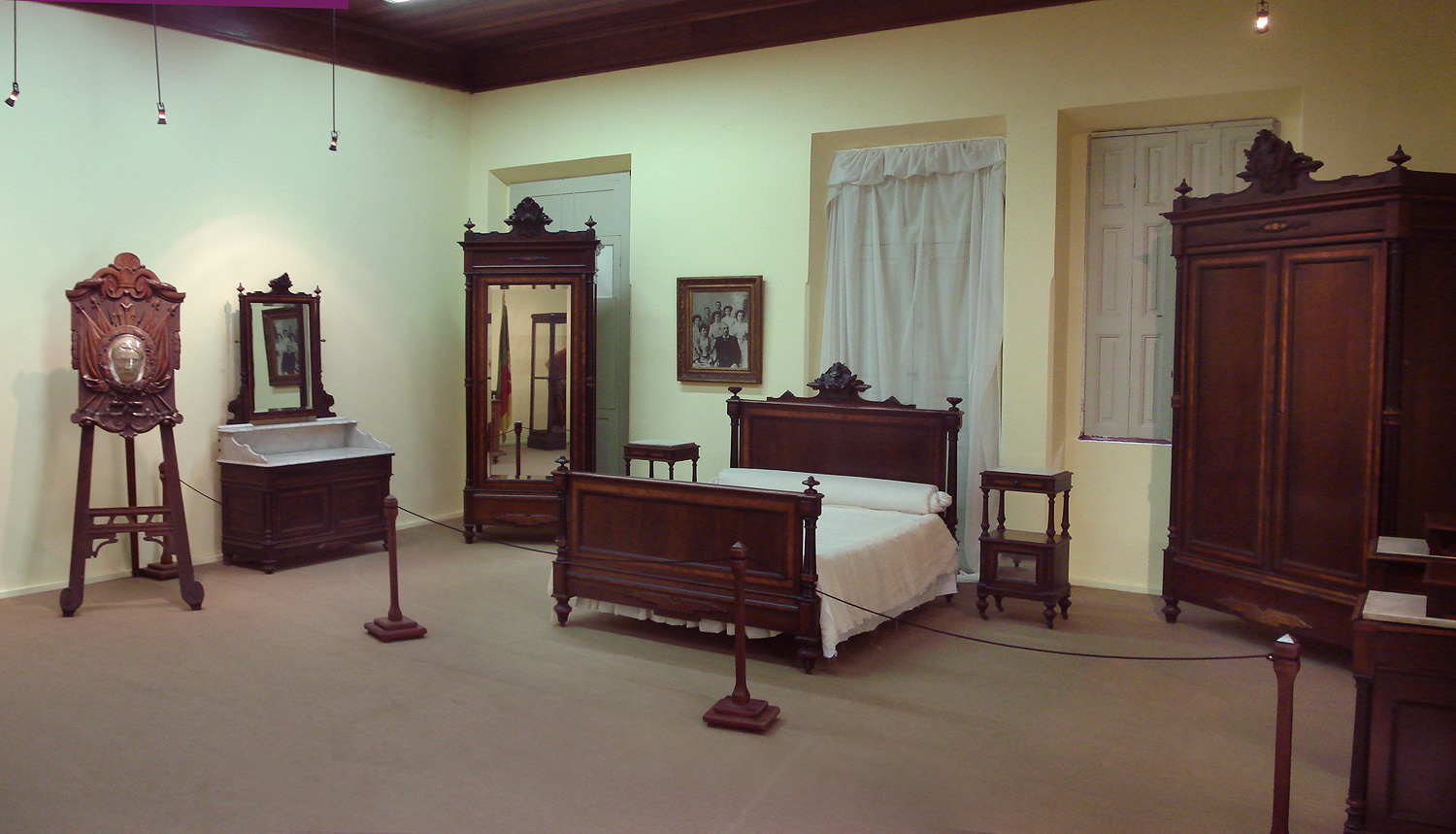
Reconstruction of Júlio de Castilhos' bedroom in his final years
