= O Uraguai =

- by Basílio da Gama
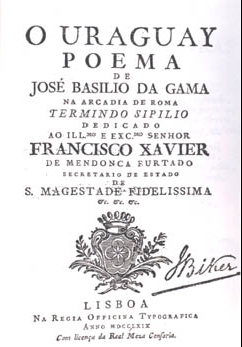
- Written: 1769
- Country: Brazil
- Language: Portuguese
- Subject: Guaraní War
- Genre: Epic poem
- Meter: Hendecasyllable
- Rhyme scheme: Unrhymed
- Lines: 1,377
- O Uraguai at Portuguese Wikisource

O Uraguai is a 1769 epic poem by writer Basílio da Gama set in what is today the Brazilian state of Rio Grande do Sul. It is an unusually short poem by epic standards, consisting of 1,377 unrhymed hendecasyllabic lines in five cantos.

O Uraguai is set at the end of the Guaraní War (1754–1756) and focuses on the slavery of the Guarani people imposed by the Society of Jesus (represented by the priest Balda), which contradicted the Catholic Church's own order. The poem is a noted example of Arcadianism and Indianism in eighteenth-century Brazilian literature.

== Structural characteristics ==
This epic poem is considered, by most, unique because of the treatment given to the characters. In most of the epic poems there is a hero that is, usually, courageous and always victorious at the end. In this epic we do not see such a thing. The Indians are exalted but almost all of them are dead at the end of the poem.

As seen, the author criticizes the wars that are moved by economical interests such as the Guaraní War, that ended with most of the Indians killed and the survivors being used as slaves. Another interesting fact is that, during the battles described in the poem there is no influence of the Christian God or any other deities for that matter.

== Synopsis ==
Canto I. This epic, different from the others, does not start with the traditional dedication of the poem or the proposition. In the first Canto of the poem, the author shows us a battlefield filled with wreckage and corpses, mainly Indian, and, coming back in time the poet presents the passage of the Luso-Hispanic army, which is commanded by the general Gomes Freire de Andrade.

Canto II. In the second part of the poem the Indian chiefs, Sepé and Cacambo, try to negotiate with the Portuguese general on the margin of the Uruguai River. The agreement is impossible once the Portuguese Jesuits decline to accept the Spanish dominion over their lands. After this the Indians, led by Sepé, bravely fight the Portuguese army, but they are subjugated by the Portuguese's fire weapons. Sepé dies in this battle and Cacambo leads the withdrawal of the Guarani army.

Canto III. The deceased Sepé appears, in a dream, to Cacambo suggesting that he set fire in the enemy camp. Cacambo succeeds in following Sepé's suggestion but is murdered when he gets back to the Jesuit camp by the order of the priest Balda, which wants to turn his own son, Baldetta, into the chief of the tribe, the position which belongs to Cacambo.

Canto IV. In this part, the poet shows the march of the Luso-Hispanic army over the Jesuit camp, where the marriage of Baldetta and Lindoia is being prepared. Lindoia, besides, prefers death. Upon the arrival of the Portuguese troops, the Indians withdraw after burning the village.

Canto V. At the end of the epic, the poet shows his opinions about the Jesuits, blaming them for the massacre of the Indians by the Portuguese troops. Homage is paid to Portuguese General Gomes Freire de Andrade, who protects and respects the surviving Indians.

== Translation ==
An English translation of O Uraguai was written by Richard Francis Burton and published posthumously.
