= Treaty of Madrid (13 January 1750) =

1750 treaty between Spain and Portugal

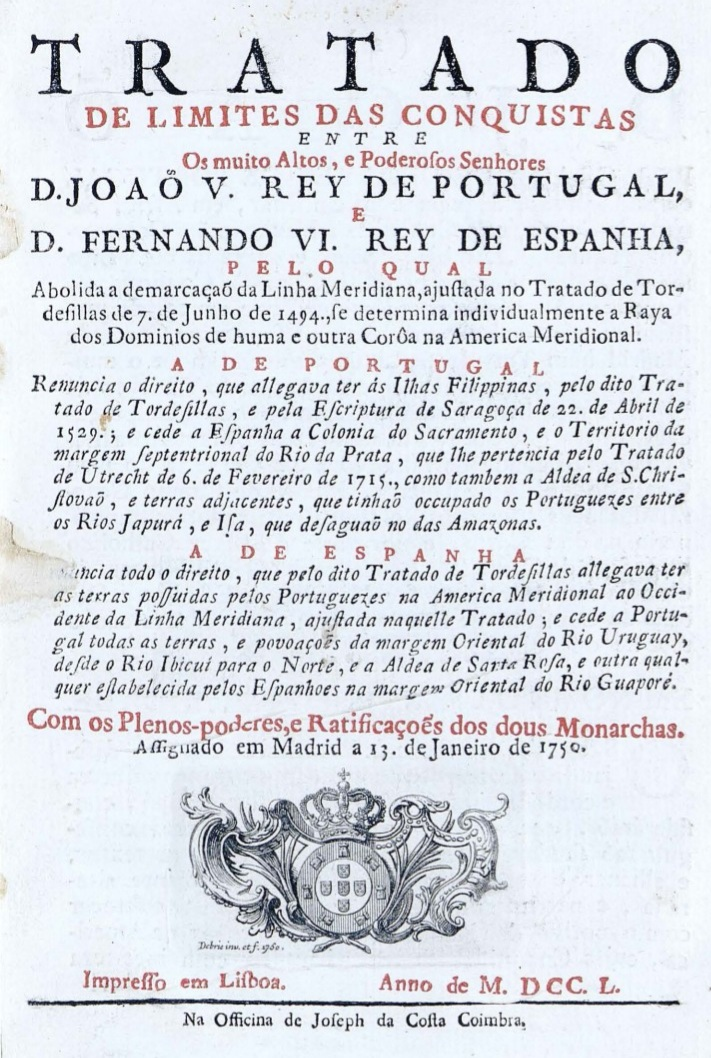
- Title page of the Treaty of Madrid (1750)
- Signed: 13 January 1750
- Location: Madrid, Spain
- Parties: Spain; Portugal
- Languages: Spanish; Portuguese

The Treaty of Madrid (also known as the Treaty of Limits of the Conquests) was an agreement concluded between Spain and Portugal on 13 January 1750. In an effort to end decades of conflict in the region of present-day Uruguay, the treaty established detailed territorial boundaries between Portuguese Brazil and the Spanish colonial territories to the south and west. Portugal also recognized Spain's claim to the Philippines while Spain acceded to the westward expansion of Brazil. The treaty included a mutual guarantee of support in case either state's American colonies were attacked by a third power.

Most notably, Spain and Portugal expressly abandoned the papal bull, Inter caetera, and the treaties of Tordesillas and Zaragoza as the legal basis for colonial division.

== Background ==
See also Spanish–Portuguese War (1735–1737)

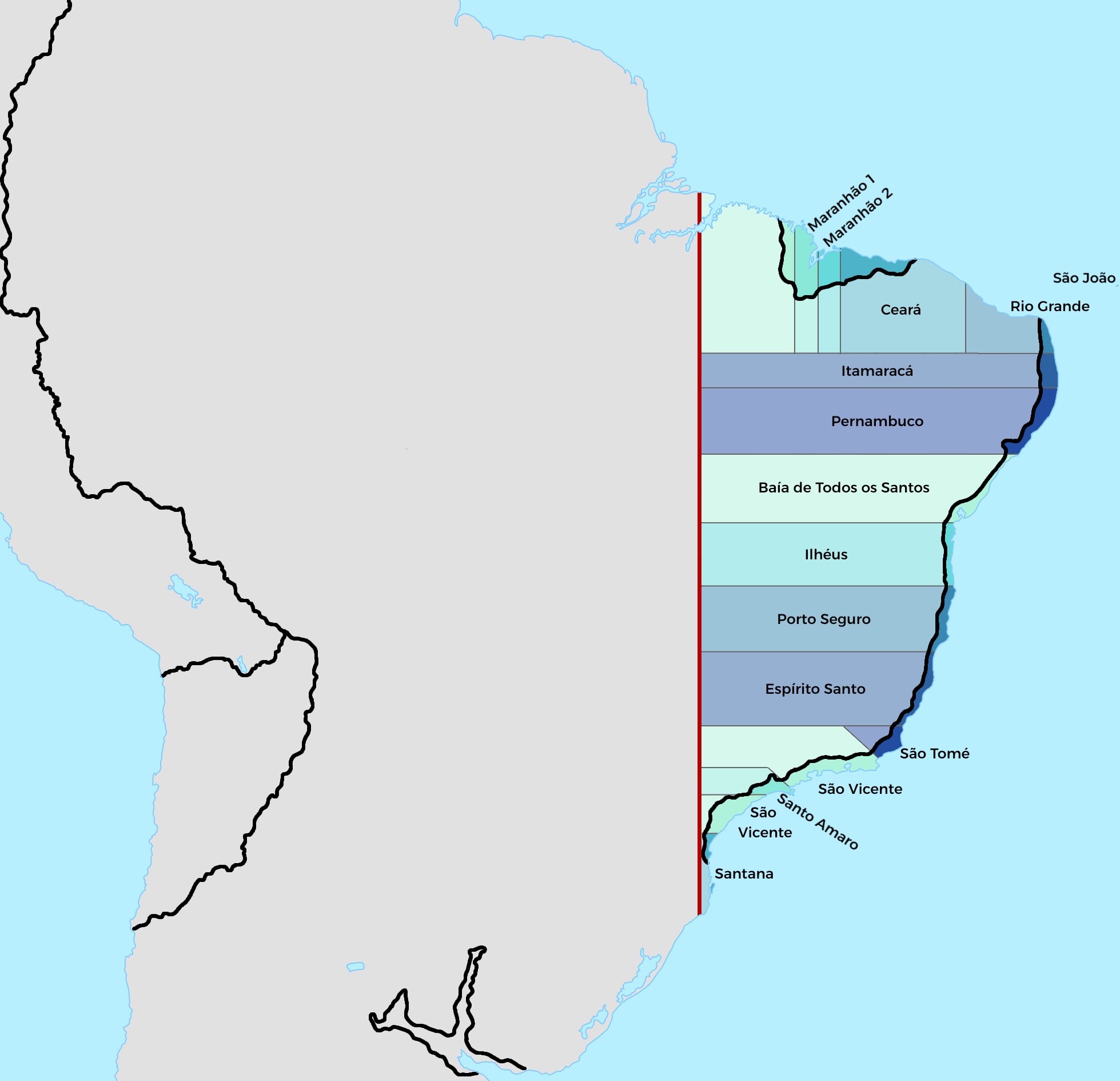
1534 Brazil according to the Treaty of Tordesillas

Earlier treaties, such as the Treaty of Tordesillas and the Treaty of Zaragoza, drawn up by both countries and mediated by Pope Alexander VI, stipulated that the Portuguese Empire in South America could extend no further west than 370 leagues west of the Cape Verde Islands (called the Tordesillas meridian, approximately the 46th meridian). Had those treaties remained unchanged, the Spanish would have held both what is today the city of São Paulo and all land to the west and south. Thus, Brazil would be only a fraction of its present-day size.

Gold was discovered in Mato Grosso in 1695. Starting in the 17th century, Portuguese explorers, traders, and missionaries from the state of Maranhao in the north, and gold-seekers and slave-hunters (the famous bandeirantes of São Paulo) in the south, had penetrated far to the west and south-west of the old treaty line, also looking for slaves.

New captaincies (administrative divisions) had been created by the Portuguese beyond Brazil's previously established boundaries: Minas Gerais, Goias, Mato Grosso, and Santa Catarina.

== National motivations ==
=== Portugal ===
The Portuguese wanted to strike a balance between the boundary claims of Spain and Portugal by allotting the greater part of the Amazon basin to themselves and that of the Río de la Plata to Spain. They also sought to secure the undisputed sovereignty of the gold and diamond districts of Goiás and Mato Grosso for the Portuguese Crown, as well as to secure Brazil's frontier by the retention of the Rio Grande do Sul and the acquisition of the Spanish Jesuit Misiones Orientales on the left bank of the Uruguay River. They hoped that the meeting would allow them to secure the western frontier of Brazil and river communication with Maranhão-Pará by ensuring that navigation on the rivers Tocantins, Tapajos and Madeira remained in Portuguese hands.

=== Spain ===
Spain wanted to stop the westward advance of the Portuguese, who had already encroached on much of what was theoretically Spanish territory, even though it consisted mostly of little explored indigenous territories. They also sought to transfer to Spain the Portuguese colony of Sacramento, which had functioned as a back door for the illegal Anglo-Portuguese trade with the Viceroyalty of Peru, and which rendered the Spanish city of Buenos Aires dangerously exposed to foreign invasion. Furthermore, they hoped to undermine the Anglo-Portuguese alliance, and thus eventually facilitate a Spanish-Portuguese alliance against British aggression and ambition in South America.

== Cartographic issues ==
- 1722 map of French cartographer Guillaume Delisle
- 1749 map of Alexandre de Gusmão: Mappa das Cortes, or Mapa de las Cortes

== International context ==
The Philippines were under Spanish sovereignty.

== Structure ==
The original treaty was in both Portuguese and Spanish, and consists of a lengthy preamble and 26 articles.

== Terms ==
The Treaty of Madrid was based on the principles of Uti possidetis, ita possideatis from Roman law ("who owns by fact owns by right") and "natural boundaries", stating respectively in the preamble: "each party must stay with what it now holds" and "the boundaries of the two Domains... are the sources and courses of the most notable rivers and mountains", and thereby authorizing the Portuguese to retain the lands they had occupied at the expense of the Spanish Empire. The treaty also stipulated that Spain would receive the Sacramento Colony and Portugal the Misiones Orientales. They were seven independent Jesuit missions of the upper Uruguay River. The Treaty of Tordesillas was specifically abrogated.

The treaty sensibly sought to follow geographic features in fixing the boundary: it moved westward from a point on the Atlantic coast south of Rio Grande do Sul, then northward irregularly following parts of the Uruguay, Iguaçu, Paraná, Paraguay, Guaporé, Madeira, and Javary Rivers, and north of the Amazon, ran from the middle Negro to the watershed between the Amazon and Orinoco basins and along the Guiana watershed to the Atlantic.

Soon after the signing of the treaty, two commissions for demarcation were created. The northern one was chaired by the State Governor of Grão-Pará and Maranhão, and the southern one by the Portuguese Governor of Rio de Janeiro.

== Aftermath ==
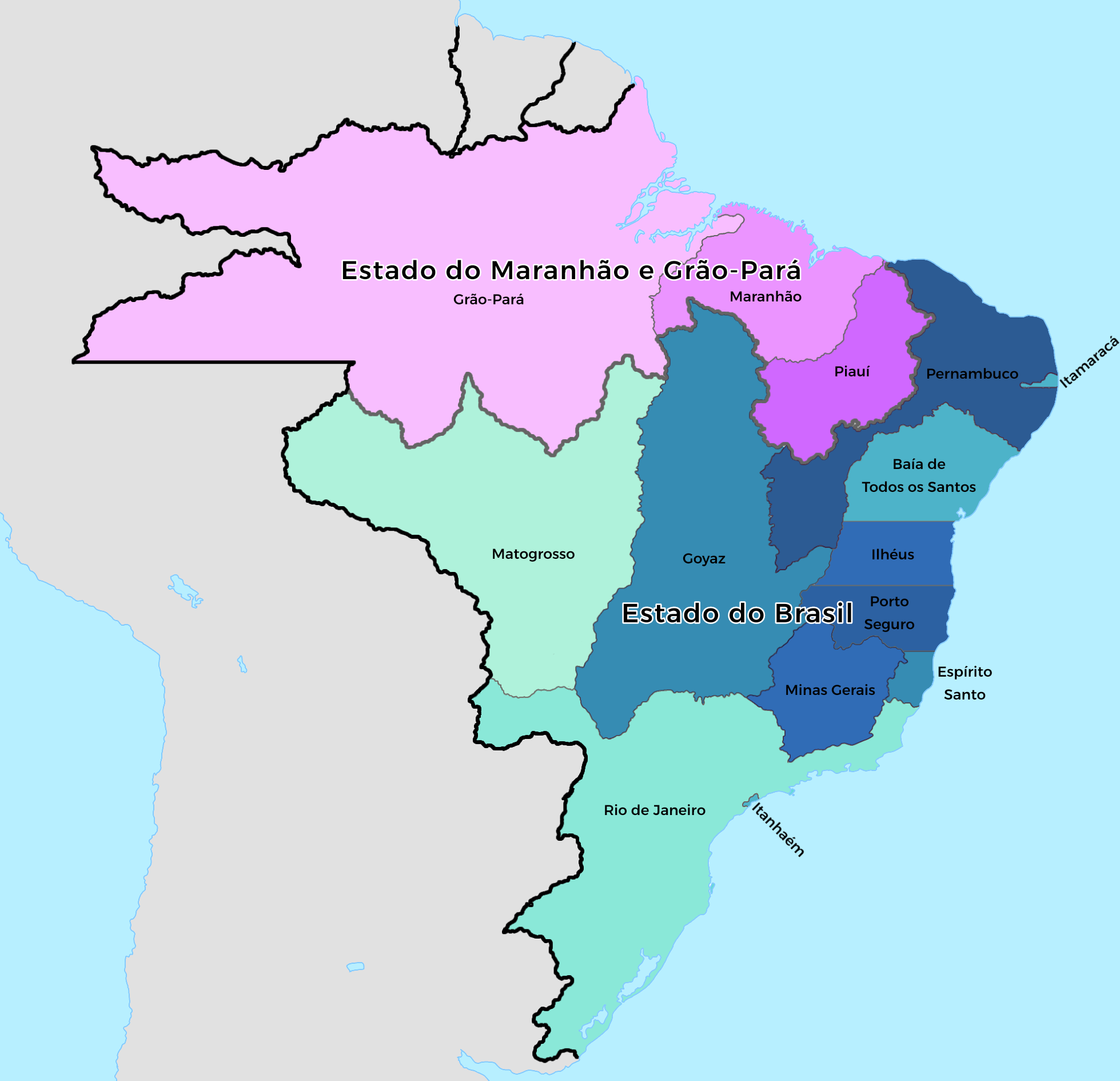
Brazil according to the Treaty of Madrid of 1750, reaffirmed in the First Treaty of San Ildefonso of 1777.

The Treaty of Madrid was significant because it substantially defined the modern boundaries of Brazil. However, the resistance of the Jesuits to surrendering their missions, and the refusal of the Guaraní to be forcibly relocated, led to the nullification of the treaty by the subsequent Treaty of El Pardo, signed by both countries in 1761.

The opposition by the Guaraní led to the Guaraní War of 1756. There were frequent skirmishes in the Banda Oriental after the 1750 treaty. The terms of the Treaty of Madrid, with a few exceptions, were re-established in the First Treaty of San Ildefonso in 1777, and that treaty was again negated in 1801.

== See also ==
- Treaty of Madrid (5 October 1750)
- Catholic Church and the Age of Discovery
- Spanish missions in South America
