= Basílio da Gama =

Brazilian poet (1740–1795)

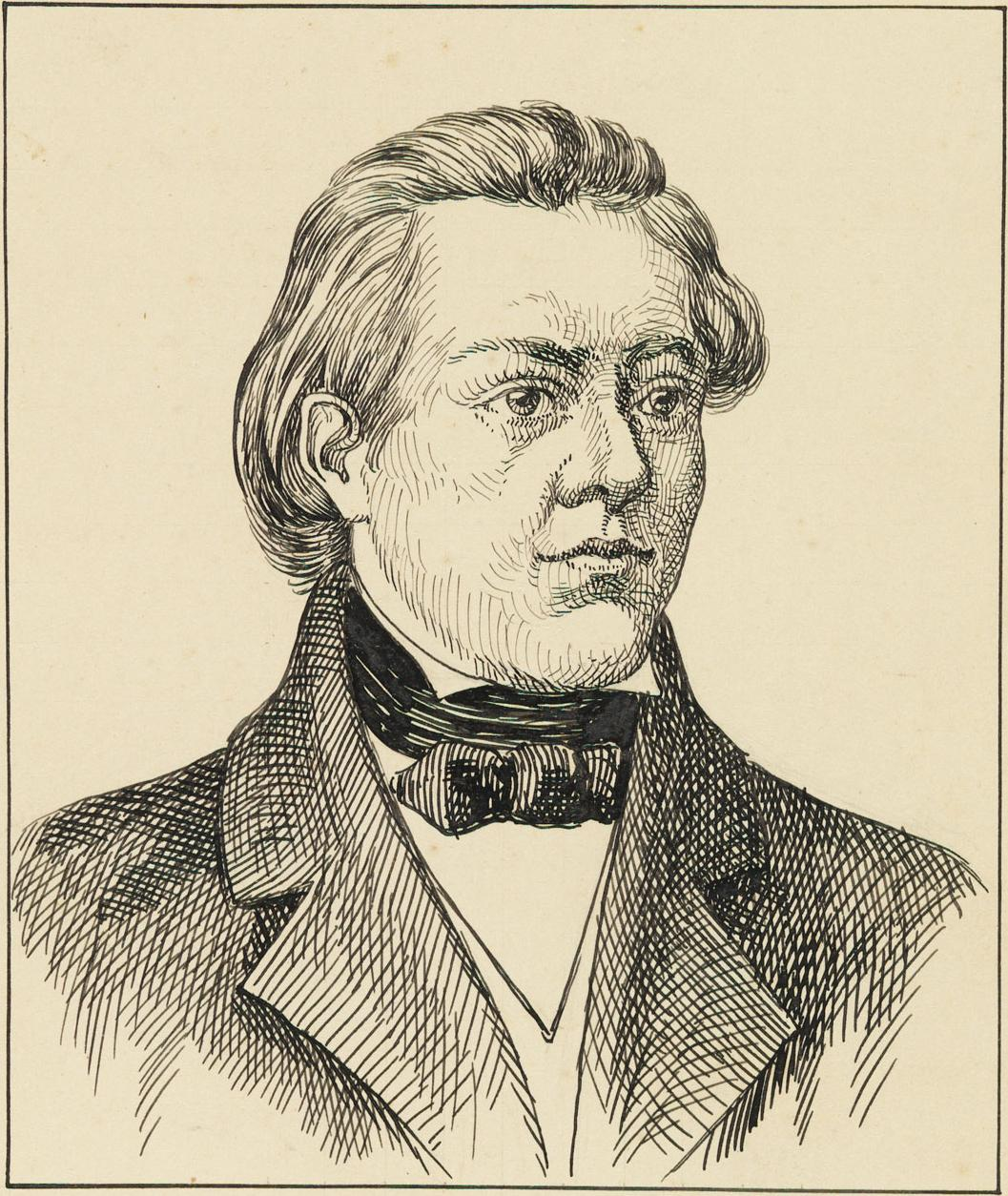
- A drawing of Basílio da Gama
- Born: José Basílio da Gama; 10 April 1740; Tiradentes, Minas Gerais, Colony of Brazil
- Died: 31 July 1795 (aged 55); Lisbon, Kingdom of Portugal
- Occupation: Poet
- Writing career
- Pen name: Termindo Sipílio
- Notable work: O Uraguai
- Literary movement: Neoclassicism

José Basílio da Gama (April 10, 1740 – July 31, 1795) was a colonial Brazilian poet and member of the Society of Jesus, famous for the epic poem O Uraguai. He wrote under the pen name Termindo Sipílio.

He is patron of the 4th chair of the Brazilian Academy of Letters.

== Biography ==
José Basílio da Gama was born in 1740, in the city of São José do Rio das Mortes (whose name was later changed to Tiradentes), in Minas Gerais, to Manuel da Costa Villas-Boas and Quitéria Inácia da Gama. The death of his father, when he was a young child, caused a hard situation in his life. During this period, a brigadier named Alpoim who served as his protector sent him to Rio de Janeiro, where he studied at Jesuit College, starting his novitiate for the Society of Jesus. With the expulsion of the Jesuits in 1759, Basílio went to Europe, where he travelled through many countries, such as Italy and Portugal, between 1760 and 1767. In Italy, he ingressed at the Roman Arcadia, where he adopted the pen name Termindo Sipílio.

During the first months of 1767, he went to Rio de Janeiro, to the inauguration of the ship "Serpente" (mentioned in the third canto of his epic poem O Uraguai). In 1768, he returned to Portugal, in hopes of entering at the University of Coimbra, but was arrested and exiled in Portuguese Angola, due to suspicion of being a Jesuit sympathizer. However, he received the forgiving of the Marquis of Pombal because of an epithalamium he wrote for his daughter.

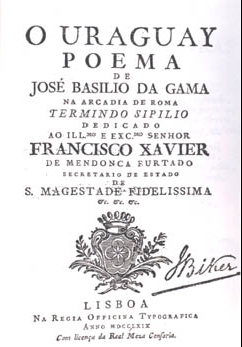
The front cover of Gama's O Uraguai

During his last years, Basílio lived happily, becoming a member of the Sciences Academy of Lisbon. He died July 31, 1795, in Portugal.

== Works ==
- Epitalâmio às Núpcias da Sra. D. Maria Amália (1769)
- O Uraguai (1769)
- A Declamação Trágica (written in 1772, but published posthumously, in 1820)
- Os Campos Elísios (1766)
- Quitúbia (1791)

Preceded by New creation	Brazilian Academy of Letters – Patron of the 4th chair	Succeeded by Aluísio Azevedo (founder)
