= Porto Alegre =

Capital and largest city of Rio Grande do Sul, Brazil

- Municipality
- Município de Porto Alegre; Municipality of Porto Alegre
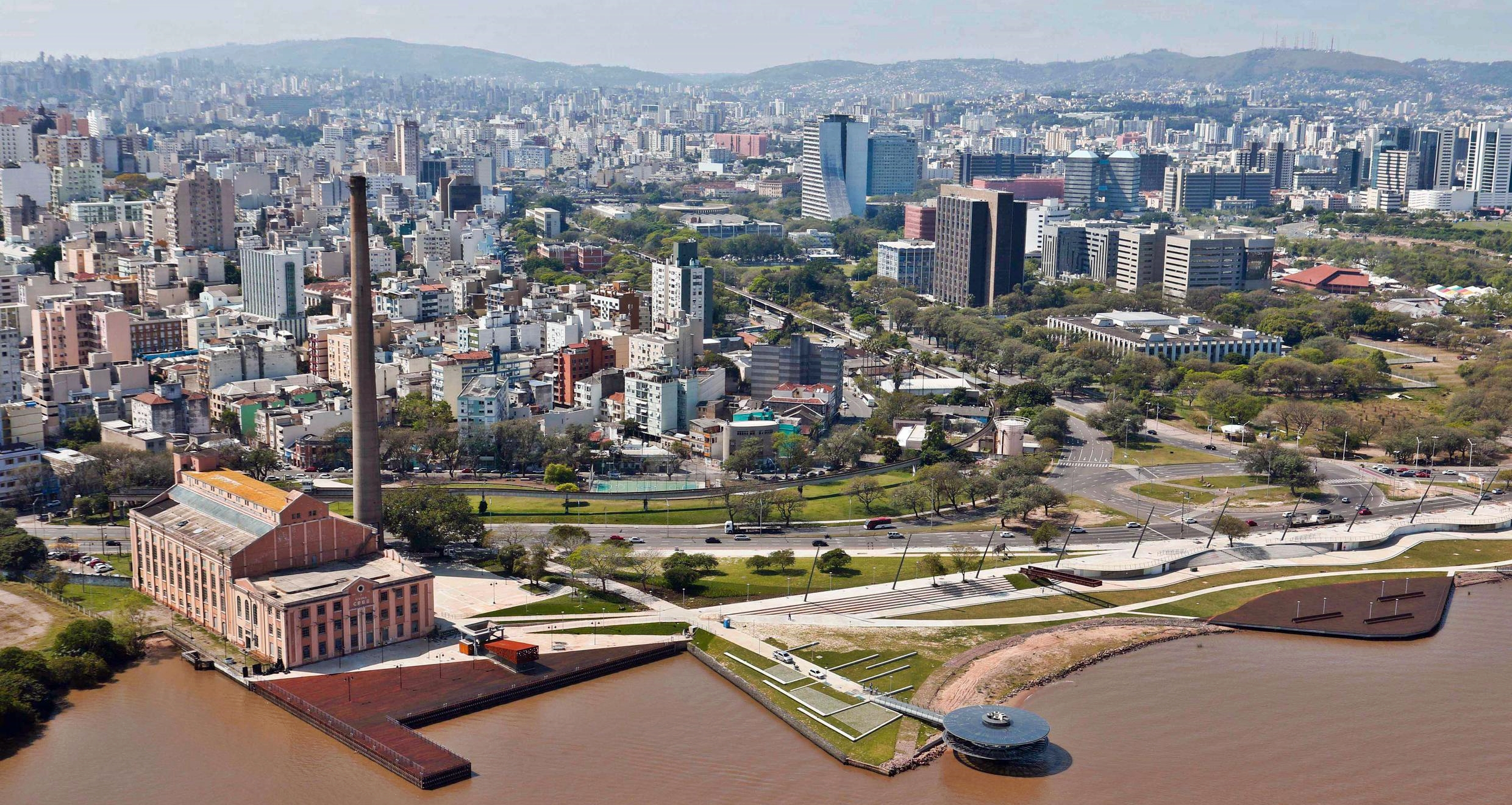
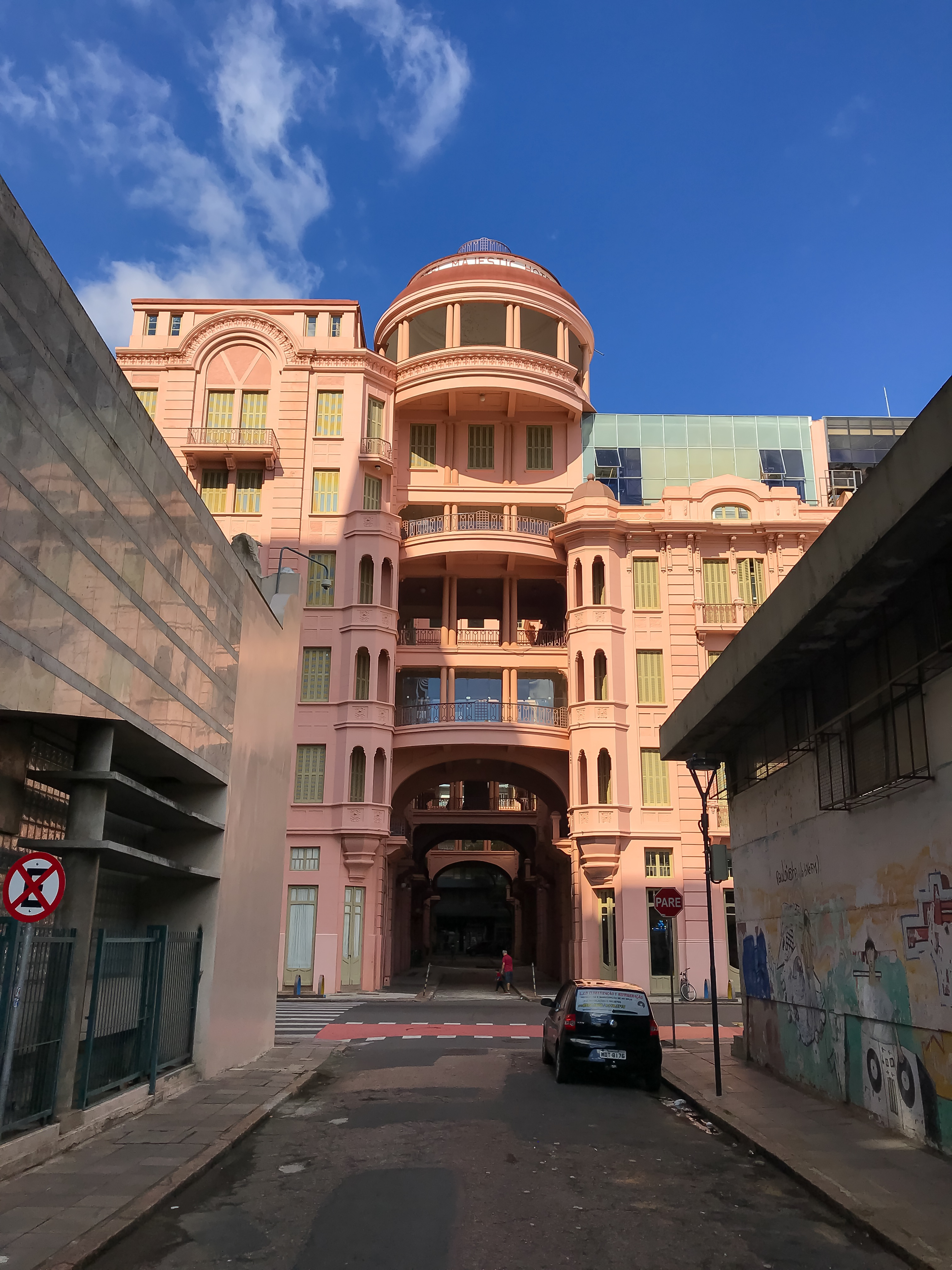
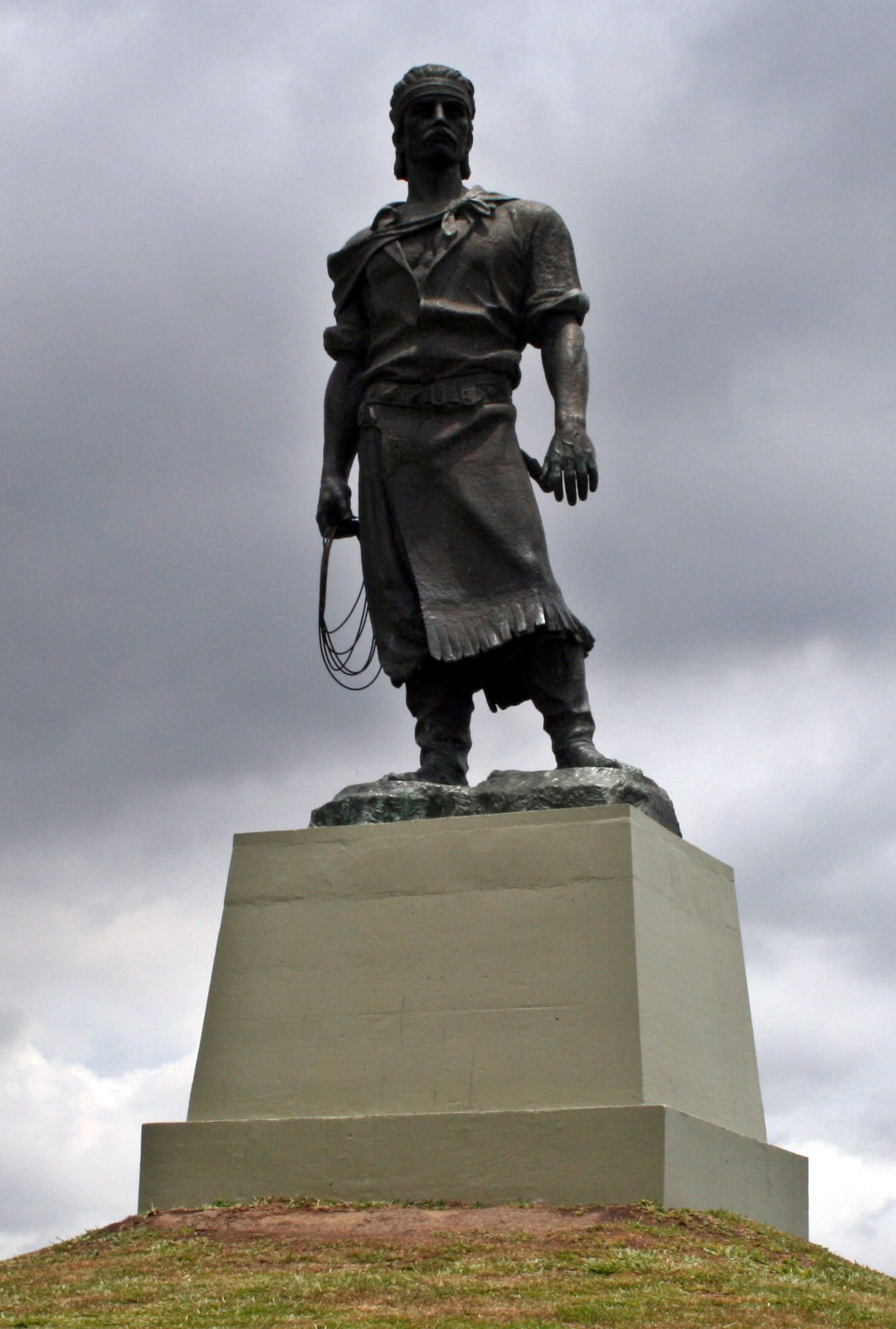
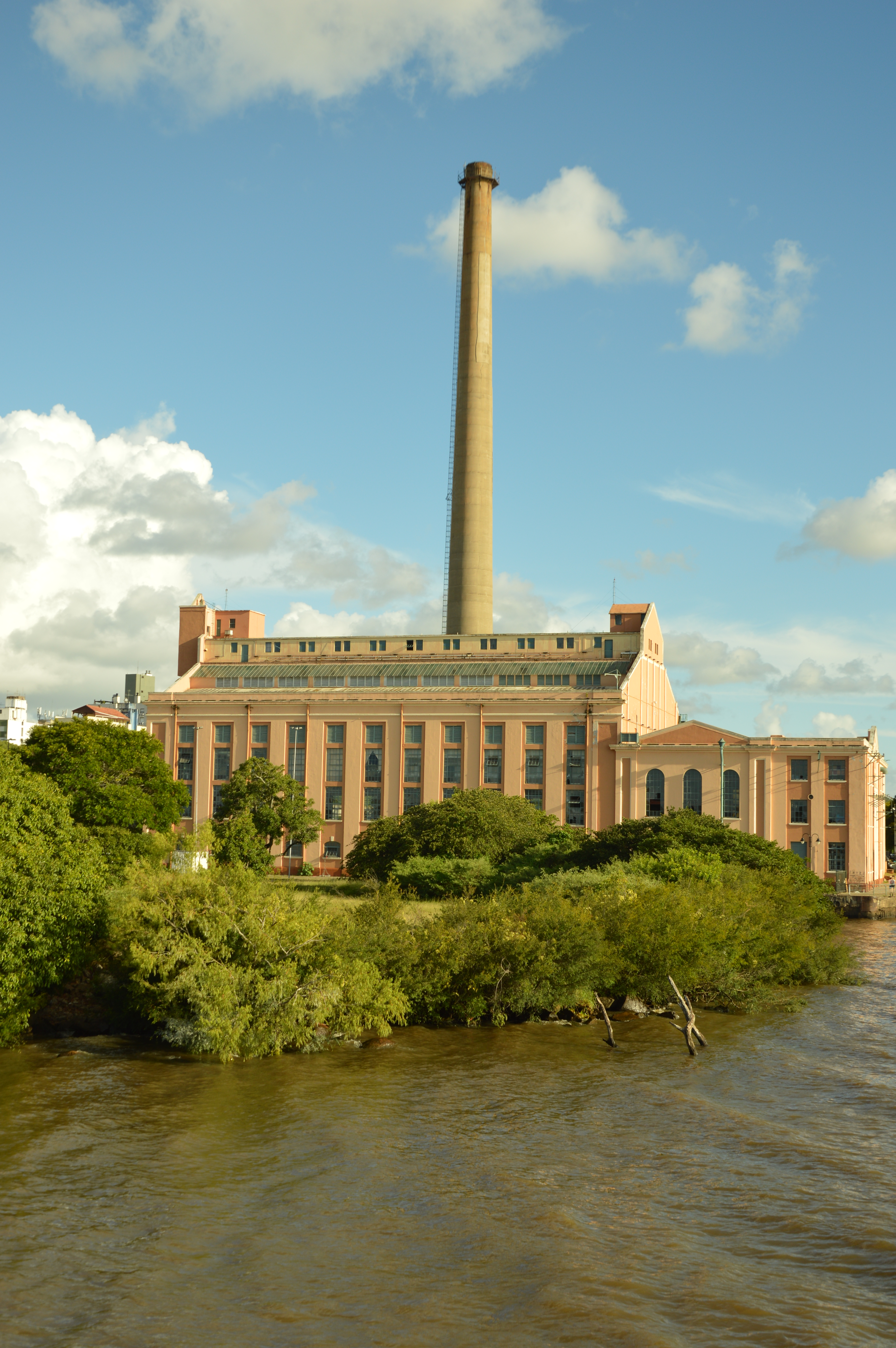
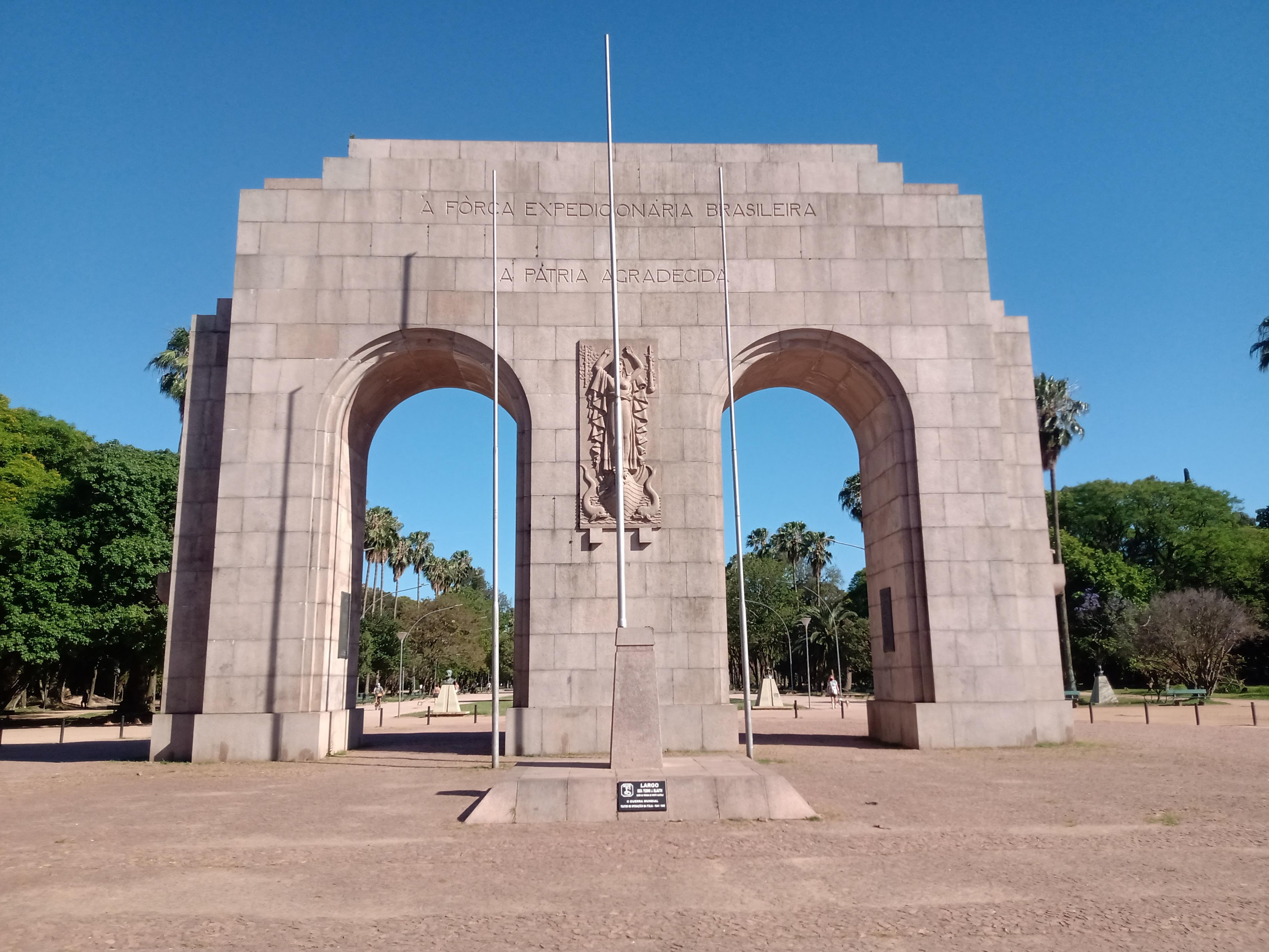
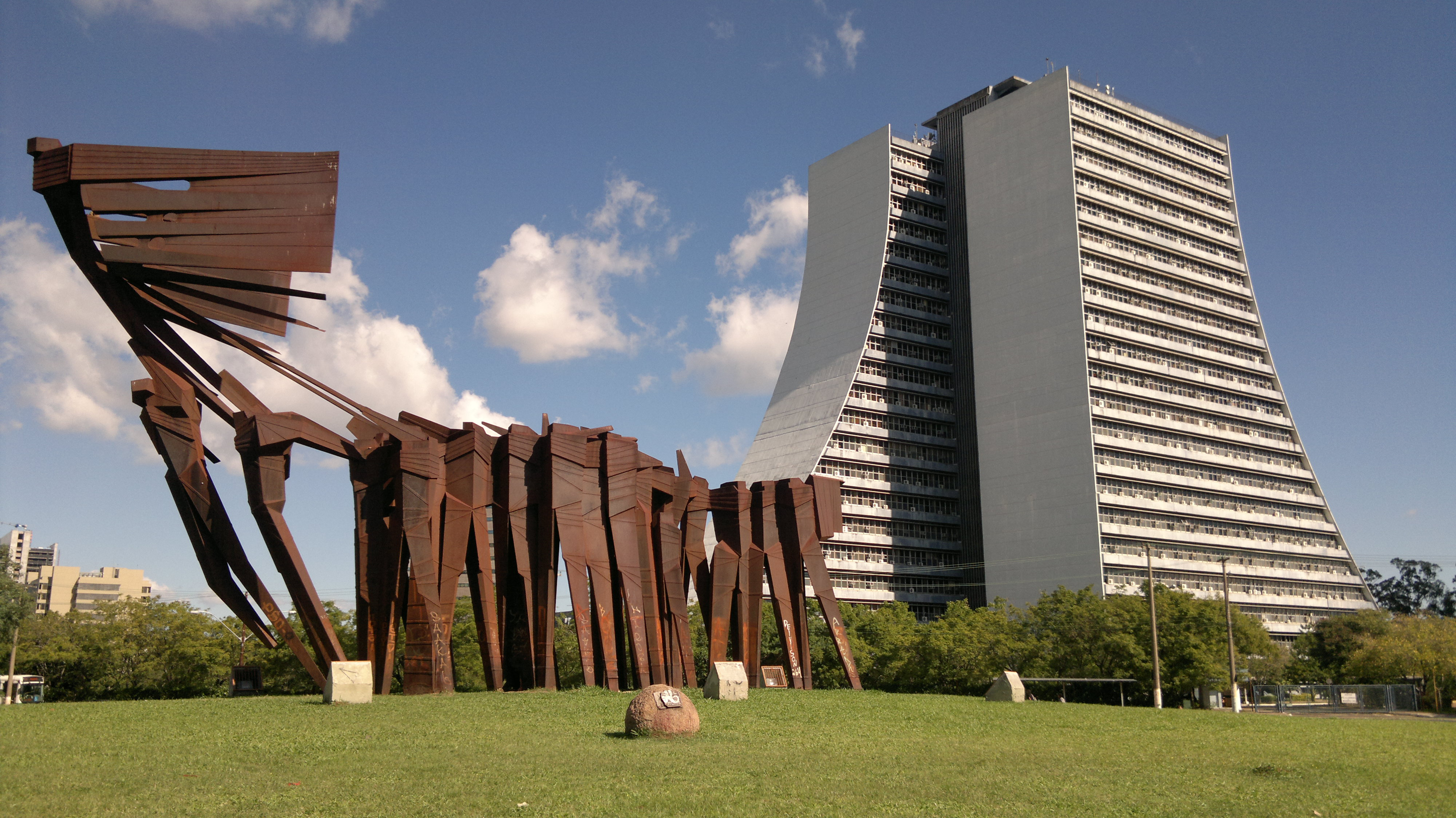
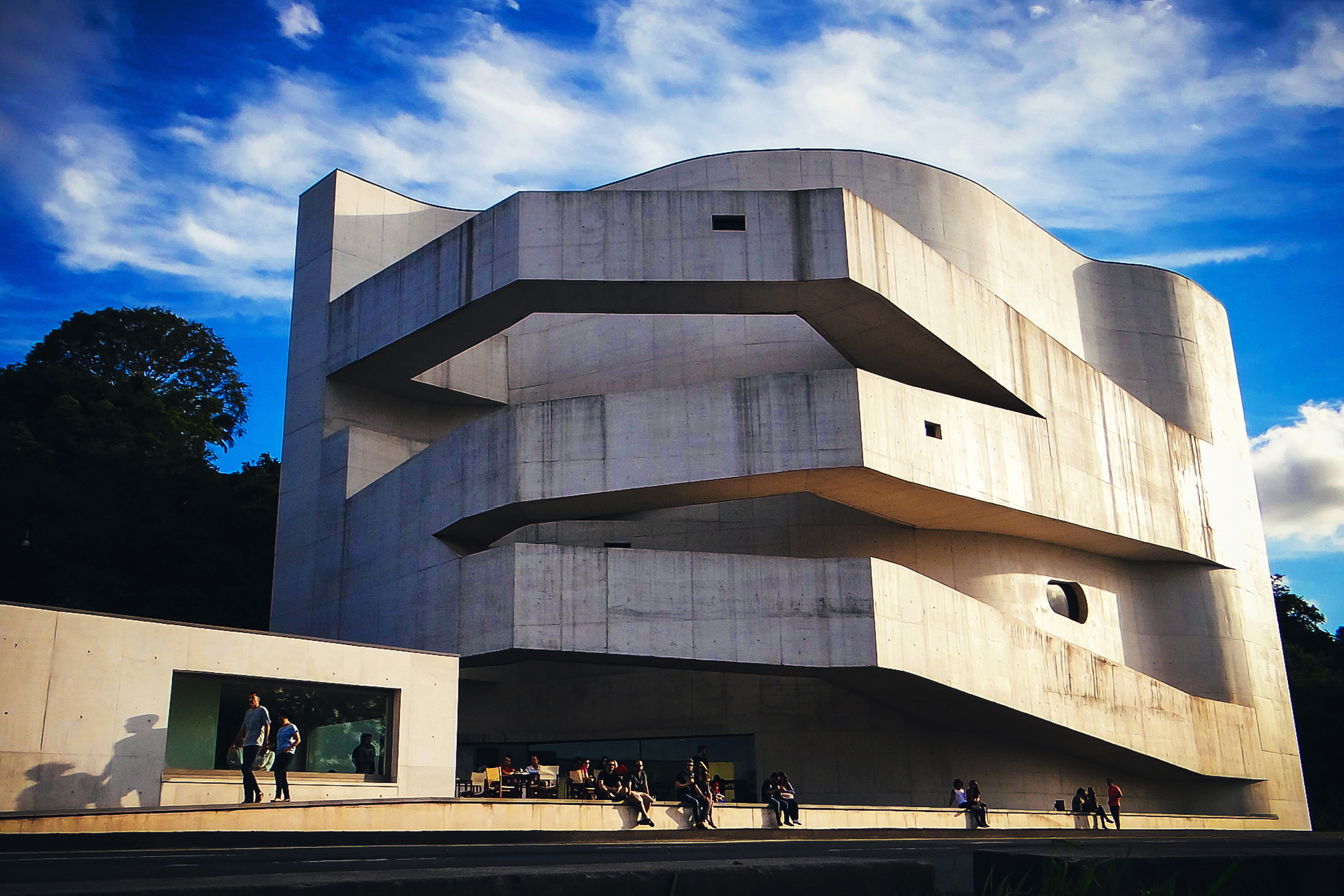
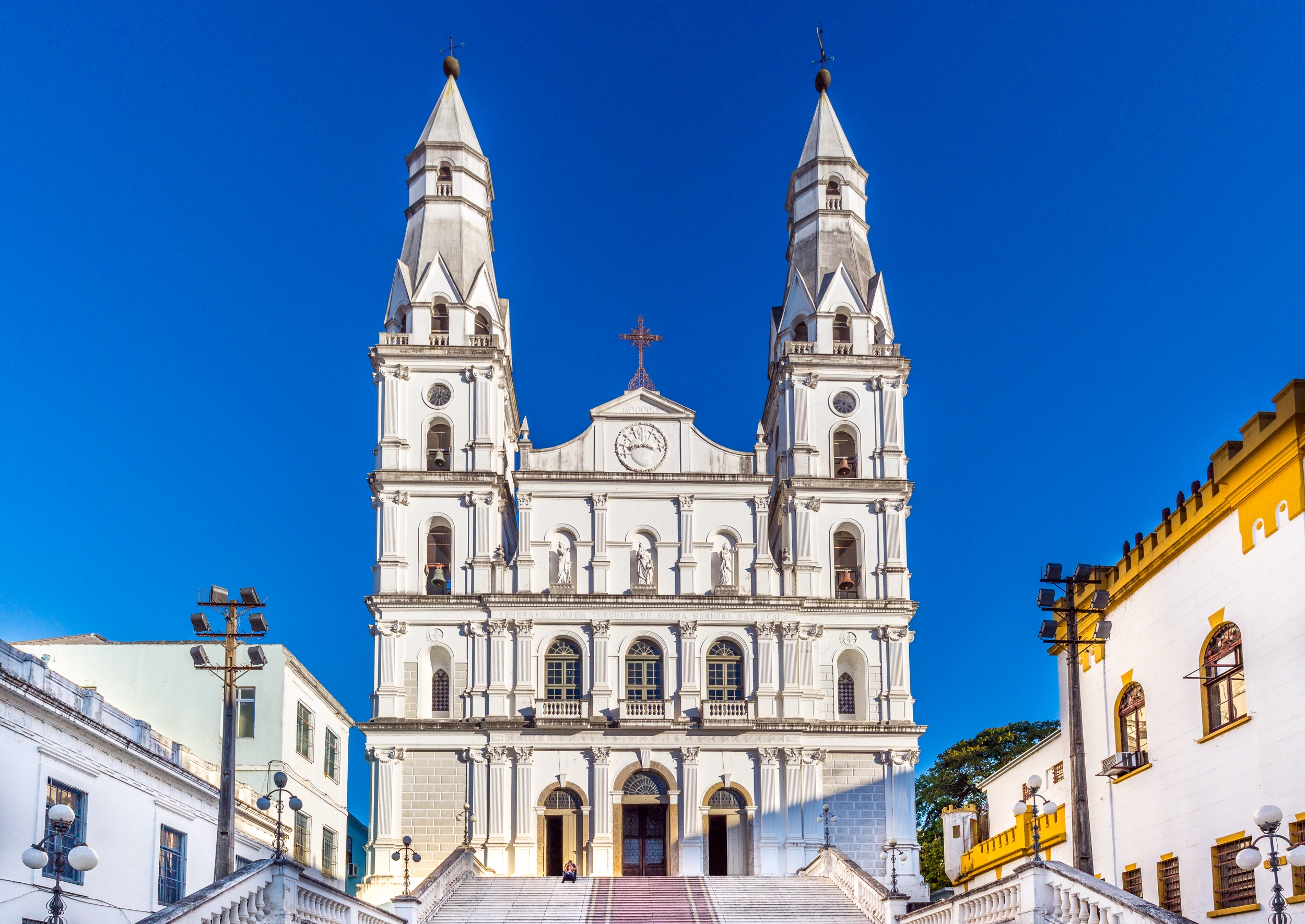
- Porto Alegre and Guaíba Lake Mario Quintana House of Culture Statue of Laçador Gasometer Plant Farroupilha Park Monument to the Azoreans and Administrative Center Iberê Camargo Foundation Minor Basilica of Our Lady of Sorrows

- Flag Coat of arms
- Motto: Leal e Valorosa Cidade de Porto Alegre; Loyal and Valiant City of Porto Alegre

- Location within Brazil Location within South America
- Coordinates: 30°01′59″S 51°13′48″W
- Country: Brazil
- Region: South
- State: Rio Grande do Sul
- Mesoregion: Metropolitan Porto Alegre
- Microregion: Microregion of Porto Alegre
- Founded: 26 March 1772; 254 years ago

Government
  - Mayor: Sebastião Melo (MDB)

Area
  - Municipality: 496.827 km^{2} (191.826 sq mi)
- Elevation: 10 m (33 ft)

Population (2025)
  - Municipality: 1,388,794 (12th)
  - Density: 2,837.5/km^{2} (7,349/sq mi)
  - Metro: 4,167,025 (5th)
- Demonym: Porto-alegrenses

GDP (PPP, constant 2015 values)
  - Year: 2023
  - Total: $77.7 billion
- Time zone: UTC-3 (UTC−3)
- Postal Code: 90000-000
- Area code: +55 51
- HDI (2010): 0.805 – very high
- Website: www.prefeitura.poa.br

Porto Alegre (UK: /ˌpɔːrtuː əˈlɛɡreɪ/, US: /- ɑːˈleɪɡri, ˌpɔːrtoʊ əˈlɛɡrə/; Brazilian Portuguese: [ˈpoʁtu aˈlɛɡɾi, -tw aˈ-], locally [ˈpoɾ-]; lit. 'Joyful Harbor') is the capital and largest city of the Brazilian state of Rio Grande do Sul. Its population of roughly 1.4 million inhabitants (2022) makes it the 11th-most populous city in the country and the centre of Brazil's fifth-largest metropolitan area, with 4.1 million inhabitants (2022). The city is the southernmost capital city of a Brazilian state.

Porto Alegre was founded in 1769 by Manuel Jorge Gomes de Sepúlveda, who used the pseudonym José Marcelino de Figueiredo to hide his identity; the official date, though, is 1772 with the act signed by immigrants from the Azores, Portugal.

The city lies on the eastern bank of the Guaíba Lake, where five rivers converge to form the Lagoa dos Patos, a giant freshwater lagoon navigable by even the largest of ships. This five-river junction has become an important alluvial port and a chief industrial and commercial centre of Brazil.

In the late 20th and early 21st centuries, Porto Alegre hosted the World Social Forum, an initiative of several nongovernment organizations. The city became famous for being the first city that implemented participatory budgeting. The 9th Assembly of the World Council of Churches was held in Porto Alegre in 2006. Since 2000, Porto Alegre also hosts one of the world's largest free software events, called FISL. The city was one of the host cities of the 2014 FIFA World Cup, having previously been a venue for the 1950 FIFA World Cup.

== History ==
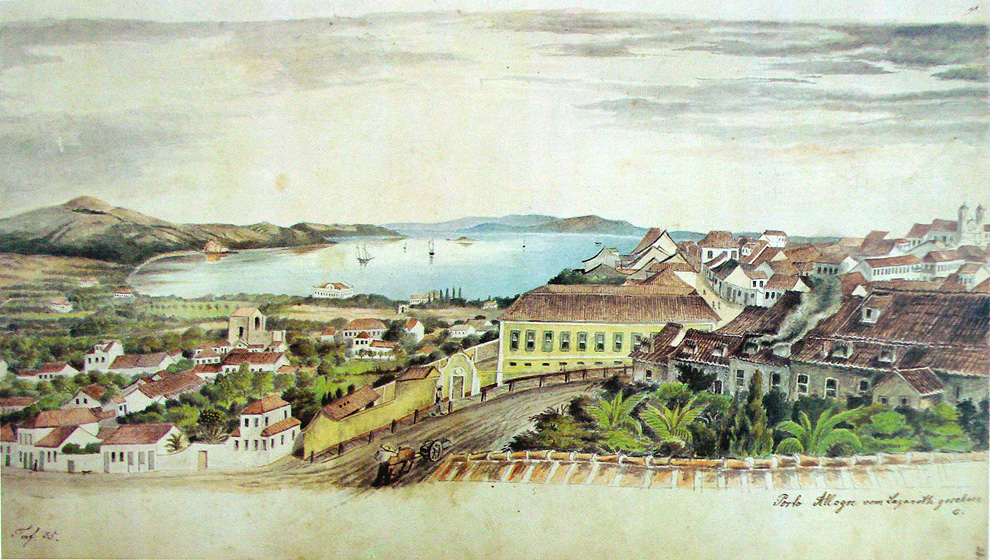
Porto Alegre in 1852

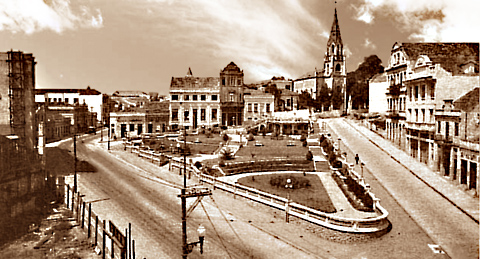
Otávio Rocha Square in 1930

The official date of the foundation of the city of Porto Alegre is 26 March 1772, by Manuel Sepúlveda, when Freguesia de São Francisco do Porto dos Casais was created and changed a year later to Nossa Senhora da Madre de Deus de Porto Alegre. However, the village started in 1752, when 60 Azorean couples were brought over by the Treaty of Madrid to set up Missions at the Northeast Region of Rio Grande do Sul that was handed over to the Portuguese Crown in exchange for the Sacramento Colony located on the margin of the Plata River. Land demarcation took a long time and the Azoreans settled permanently at Porto de Viamão, which was the first name by which Porto Alegre went.

On 24 July 1773, Porto Alegre became the capital city of the province, when the administration of Manuel Sepúlveda, who used the fictitious name or pseudonym José Marcelino de Figueiredo, to hide his identity, officially started. In 1824, immigrants from all over the world started arriving, especially German, Italian, Spanish, Polish, Jewish, and Lebanese.

The capital city of Rio Grande do Sul is also the capital city in the Pampas region, the name given to the region of fauna and flora typical of the vast plains that dominate the landscape of the southern tip of Brazil, and parts of Argentina and Uruguay, from where the gaúcho comes, the historical figure of a brave warrior who fought legendary battles and wars in the quest to conquer the borders of the kingdoms of Portugal and Spain in the 16th century.

After the declaration of Brazilian Independence in 1822, this was opposed by the inhabitants of the region and they fought a long war for their independence from the Brazilian Empire. The Farrapos War started with the confrontation in Porto Alegre, near the Azenha bridge on 20 September 1835. During the war, the city fell to the rebels and was later recaptured by the Empire. This conflict began the myth of the gaucho who is still praised in songs and celebrated in annual pageants and honored as names of streets and parks.

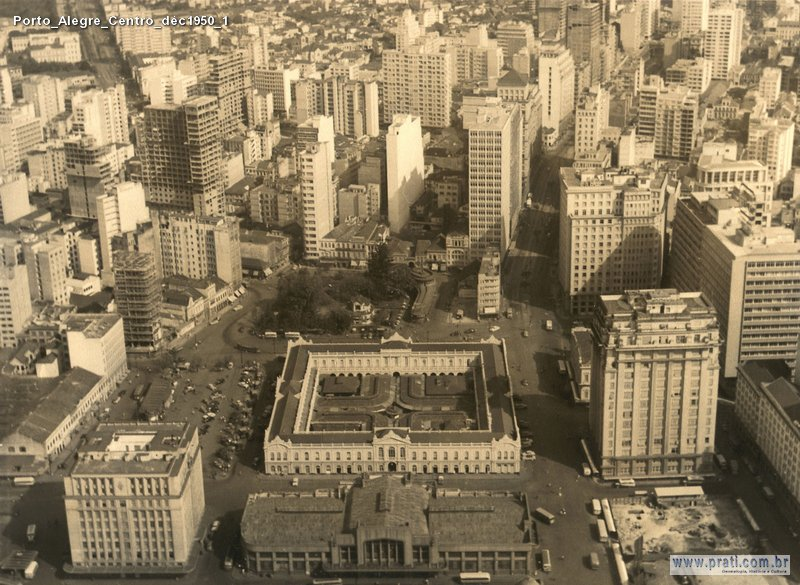
Downtown Porto Alegre in the 1950s

When the Farrapos War ended, the city continued to develop and underwent strong urban restructuring during the last decades of the 18th century, driven by the accelerated growth of port-related activities and shipyards. Its development continued over time and the city kept abreast with cultural, political and social events that were taking place within Brazil.

The city became known worldwide in 1963 through hosting the World University Games. In 1985, the people of Porto Alegre joined the movement for free elections and one of the largest demonstrations took place in the city. In 2024, the city and other neighbouring areas were flooded due to heavy rain.

=== 21st Century ===
Between the late 20th and early 21st centuries, Porto Alegre became one of Brazil's major metropolises, internationalizing its culture, boosting its economy to the point of becoming one of the richest cities in the world, and achieving high levels of quality of life. In 2010, it boasted more than 80 awards and titles distinguishing it as one of the best Brazilian capitals to live, work, do business, study, and have fun. It was also highlighted by the UN that year as the "No. 1 Metropolis in Quality of Life," for having one of the best models of democratic public management and the best Human Development Index among Brazilian metropolises.

The city also stood out for hosting the first three editions of the World Social Forum, in 2001, 2002, and 2003. The third edition attracted 20,763 delegates representing 130 countries, with a total audience of 100,000 people from all over the world. According to Oded Grajew, one of the Forum's mentors, the initiative aimed to denounce the risks of the neoliberal model. The events inspired the creation of similar movements in several countries. The 10th edition of the World Social Forum in 2010 also took place in Porto Alegre. In 2007, Porto Alegre was listed by the consulting firm PricewaterhouseCoopers among the one hundred richest cities in the world, and in 2017 it received the classification of "self-sufficient city" from the Globalization and World Cities Research Network.

However, it experiences the problems that afflict other large urban centers in Brazil, such as the presence of favelas, traffic difficulties, environmental problems, high crime rates, rising cost of living, widening socioeconomic inequalities, and many achievements in the field of participatory and community democracy previously obtained are being lost under new political orientations, including a large reduction in funding, distortion, discrediting, and emptying of the Participatory Budget.

== The city ==
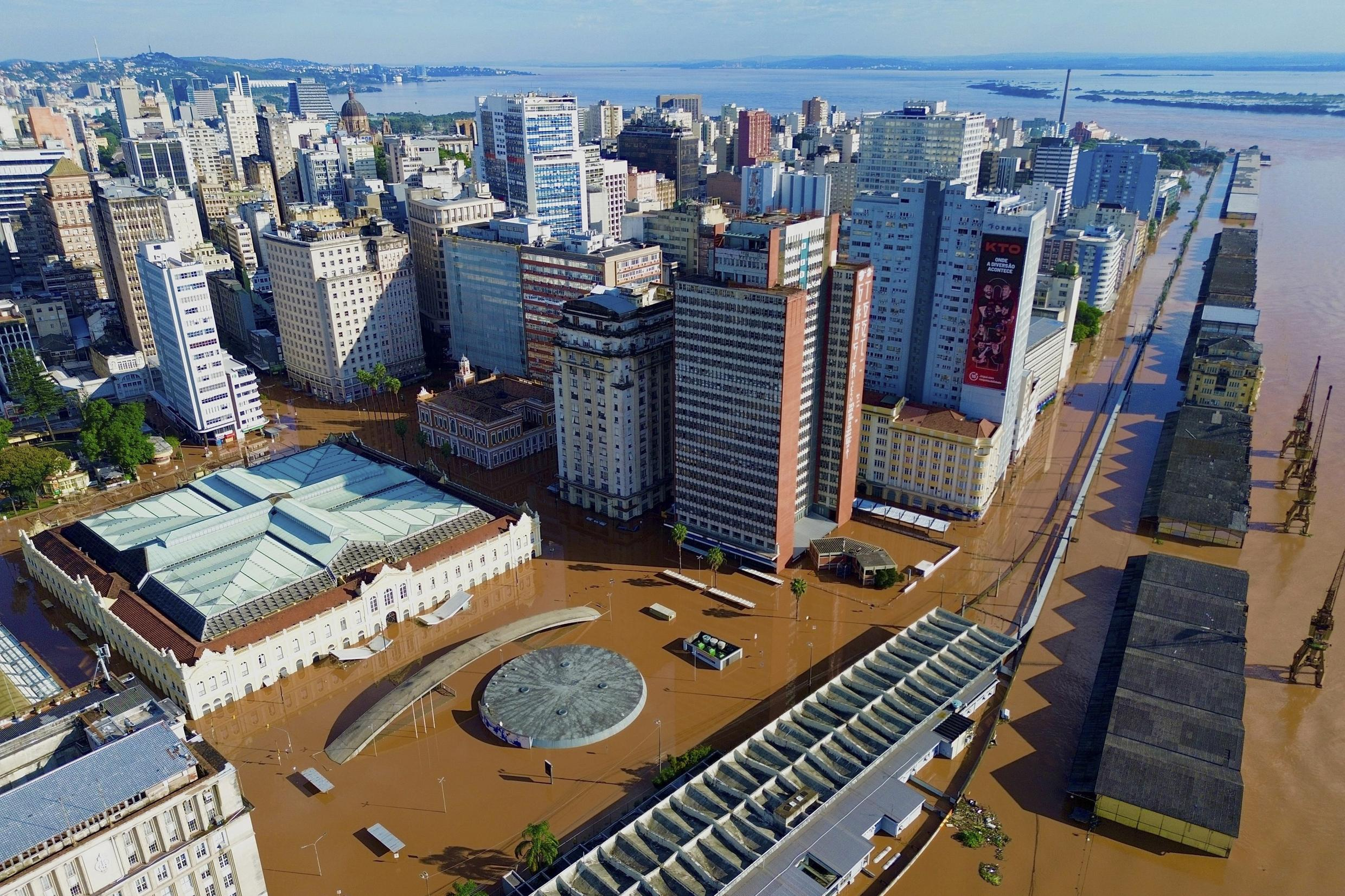
Downtown Porto Alegre during 2024 Rio Grande do Sul floods

The city is on a delta resulting from the junction of five rivers, officially called Guaíba Lake (popularly mentioned as a river, too). The city dates from the mid-18th century, when colonist from the Azores, islands in the Atlantic Ocean that are part of Portugal, settled in the area, sponsored by the Portuguese colonyimmi. The city was officially established in 1742. Porto Alegre is one of the wealthiest cities in Latin America and one of the most diverse. Its residents includes indigenous Brazilians, Afro-Brazilians, immigrants from Portugal, Russia, Germany, Italy, Spain, Ukraine and Poland. There are also significant Arab and Jewish contingents among its population. The Afro-Brazilian population of the state tends to be concentrated in the city.

Before this, Porto Alegre was the port of Viamão on the shore of Guaíba Lake. Its previous name was Porto dos Casais (Port of the Couples). and it was initially settled by Azoreans. Many families of settlers came from the city of Rio Grande in the littoral Lagunar region, to the south, a military fortress at that time. Today Rio Grande is the most important port of the State of Rio Grande do Sul. The city is also known as "Porto do Sol" (Port of the Sun) and "Cidade Sorriso" (Smile City). More than 70 neighborhoods (see below) are part of the city and two-thirds of the population are concentrated in the Zona Norte (Northern Zone), where most of the economic activity, including the city center, takes place.

Porto Alegre was the seat of the World Social Forum in 2001, 2002, 2003, 2005 and 2010. As the second largest city in southern Brazil, it is an important industrial center in the area. It is also a center for gaúcho (the popular name for natives of the state) history and culture, famous for its churrasco (barbecue) and chimarrão (a strong and hot tea prepared from yerba mate). In 2000, the literacy rate was 97%. The high quality of life is one of the city's main features.

== Geography ==
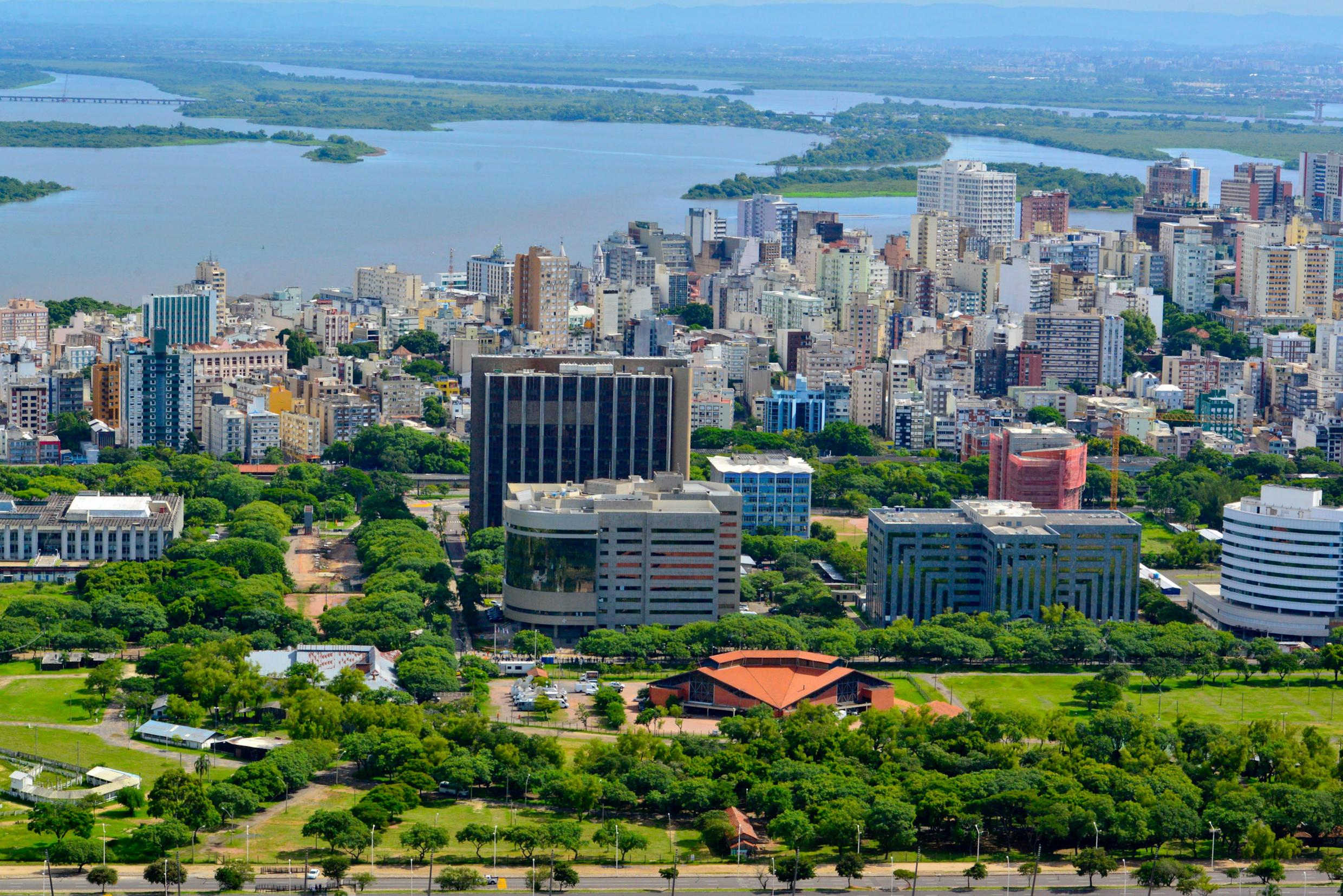
Aerial view of the historic center of Porto Alegre with Harmonia Park in the foreground

The city of Porto Alegre is located at the northern end of the large coastal lagoon, Lagoa dos Patos in southeastern Brazil. The city lies on the east bank of the mouth of the Rio Guaiba, the estuary of which forms the enormous freshwater lagoon, Lagoa dos Patos. Also joining the Guaíba at Porto Alegre are the Jacuí River, the Sinos River, the Gravataí River and the Caí River, all tributaries of Guaíba just before it empties into Lagoa dos Patos.

Porto Alegre has a long coastline on the Guaíba Lake, and its topography is punctuated by 40 hills. In the lake, a vast body of water, a maze of islands facing the city forms an archipelago where a unique ecosystem gives shelter to abundant wildlife. The city area concentrates 28% of the native flora of Rio Grande do Sul, with 9,288 species. Among these, there are many trees which are vestiges of the Atlantic Forest. The fauna is also diversified, especially in the islands and hills. The Portoalegrense environs include many parks, squares and tree-lined streets.

=== Climate ===
Porto Alegre

Climate chart (precipitation, max. and min. temperature)
J	F	M	A	M	J	J	A	S	O	N	D
121 31 21	111 31 21	103 29 20	114 26 17	113 23 14	130 20 11	164 20 10	120 22 12	147 23 13	153 25 16	106 28 17	116 30 19
- █ Average max. and min. temperatures in °C
- █ Precipitation totals in mm
Imperial conversion
J	F	M	A	M	J	J	A	S	O	N	D
4.8 88 69	4.4 87 69	4.1 85 67	4.5 80 62	4.4 73 56	5.1 69 52	6.4 67 51	4.7 71 53	5.8 73 56	6 77 60	4.2 82 63	4.6 86 67
- █ Average max. and min. temperatures in °F
- █ Precipitation totals in inches

According to the Köppen climate classification, Porto Alegre has a humid subtropical climate (Cfa) characterized by its high variability, but with well-defined seasons and evenly distributed rain throughout the year. The presence of Lake Guaíba contributes to increase the humidity of the air. The city experiences the most prominent difference among seasons and between temperature extremes among all Brazilian capitals. One reason for that is its much more southerly position relative to the rest of the country, which also contributes for the occurrence of 14 hours of daylight in December and 10 hours in June. Due to a large depletion in the ozone layer over the south of Brazil, a result of the Antarctic ozone hole, the population is occasionally dangerously exposed to extremely high UV radiation.

The winter is mild to cool, windy, rainy and quite changeable, which is also a feature of this time of the year. Usual winter temperatures range from 10 °C (50 °F) to 19 °C (66 °F). In the coldest days of the year the temperature may fall slightly below zero, like in 2012, when it recorded −0.7 °C (31 °F). The summers are very hot, with temperatures that go up to 30 °C (86 °F), sometimes reaching 40 °C (104 °F). Sometimes, summer usually has irregular rains and periods of drought. Fall tends to be as changeable as winter, but is typically warmer. Spring is usually very rainy, with thunderstorms, strong winds and hailstorms. The climate of Porto Alegre is very affected by El Niño phenomenon, with flooding in some neighborhoods of the city, especially in the islands in the Lake Guaiba. However, a drainage system and a wall along the Historic District were built after a major flood in 1941 that devastated the city, preventing further damage.

Snow is very rare, sometimes confused with sleet. The only snowfall events in Porto Alegre were in 1879, 1910, 1984, 1994, 2000 and 2006, and few of them featured accumulation. However, frost sometimes occurs in the city. Occurrence of radiation fog is common, causing several delays in early flights. Unlike other large Brazilian cities much further north, notably Brasília, São Paulo, and Rio de Janeiro which receive a pronounced summer maximum in precipitation amounts, Porto Alegre experiences a prominent winter maximum in precipitation values and cloud cover, while the summer season is primarily hot and sunny; though evidently high humidity levels often give a distinct mugginess to the conditions and reduces air quality. According to 1981-2010 averages, Porto Alegre receives an average-total precipitation amount of 1,425 millimetres (56.1 in)Annually. This average makes the city slightly wetter than Rio at 1,172 millimetres (46.1 in) and, to a small extent, drier than both São Paulo at 1,457 millimetres (57.4 in) and Brasilia at 1,557 millimetres (61.3 in), although 1991-2020 normals show annual precipitation figure rising to 1,498 millimetres (59.0 in).

The highest recorded unofficial temperature was 42.6 °C (108.7 °F) and the highest official one was 40.7 °C (105.3 °F), recorded on January 1, 1943, while the lowest official recorded temperature was −4.0 °C (24.8 °F) on July 11, 1918.

Climate data for Porto Alegre (1991–2020, extremes 1949–present)
Month	Jan	Feb	Mar	Apr	May	Jun	Jul	Aug	Sep	Oct	Nov	Dec	Year
Record high °C (°F)	39.2 (102.6)	39.0 (102.2)	38.1 (100.6)	36.0 (96.8)	32.7 (90.9)	31.6 (88.9)	32.2 (90.0)	34.9 (94.8)	38.0 (100.4)	38.2 (100.8)	39.0 (102.2)	40.3 (104.5)	40.3 (104.5)
Mean daily maximum °C (°F)	31.0 (87.8)	30.5 (86.9)	29.2 (84.6)	26.4 (79.5)	22.6 (72.7)	20.3 (68.5)	19.7 (67.5)	21.8 (71.2)	22.8 (73.0)	25.2 (77.4)	27.7 (81.9)	30.0 (86.0)	25.6 (78.1)
Daily mean °C (°F)	25.0 (77.0)	24.7 (76.5)	23.5 (74.3)	20.7 (69.3)	17.2 (63.0)	14.8 (58.6)	14.1 (57.4)	15.7 (60.3)	17.2 (63.0)	19.7 (67.5)	21.7 (71.1)	24.0 (75.2)	19.9 (67.8)
Mean daily minimum °C (°F)	20.7 (69.3)	20.7 (69.3)	19.5 (67.1)	16.8 (62.2)	13.5 (56.3)	11.3 (52.3)	10.4 (50.7)	11.6 (52.9)	13.3 (55.9)	15.7 (60.3)	17.2 (63.0)	19.4 (66.9)	15.8 (60.5)
Record low °C (°F)	10.1 (50.2)	11.9 (53.4)	9.6 (49.3)	4.5 (40.1)	2.3 (36.1)	−1.9 (28.6)	−1.1 (30.0)	−1.2 (29.8)	2.2 (36.0)	4.9 (40.8)	6.7 (44.1)	10.0 (50.0)	−1.9 (28.6)
Average precipitation mm (inches)	120.7 (4.75)	110.8 (4.36)	103.3 (4.07)	114.4 (4.50)	112.8 (4.44)	130.4 (5.13)	163.5 (6.44)	120.1 (4.73)	147.8 (5.82)	153.2 (6.03)	105.5 (4.15)	115.7 (4.56)	1,498.2 (58.98)
Average precipitation days (≥ 1 mm)	9.1	9.1	8.6	8.5	8.1	8.8	9.2	8.9	9.5	9.9	7.9	8.7	106.3
Average relative humidity (%)	73.0	74.9	75.7	77.8	81.5	82.8	81.3	78.2	77.4	76.0	72.1	71.4	76.8
Average dew point °C (°F)	20.5 (68.9)	20.6 (69.1)	19.6 (67.3)	17.3 (63.1)	14.6 (58.3)	12.4 (54.3)	11.4 (52.5)	12.5 (54.5)	13.7 (56.7)	16.0 (60.8)	17.1 (62.8)	19.2 (66.6)	16.2 (61.2)
Mean monthly sunshine hours	237.6	206.9	206.5	167.1	144.0	119.1	133.7	150.1	149.6	176.2	223.7	238.5	2,153
Mean daily daylight hours	13.8	13.1	12.2	11.4	10.6	10.2	10.4	11.1	11.9	12.8	13.6	14.1	12.1
Average ultraviolet index	6	6	6	5	4	4	4	5	5	5	6	7	5
Source 1: Instituto Nacional de Meteorologia
Source 2: NOAA Weather atlas(Daylight-UV)

=== Vegetation ===
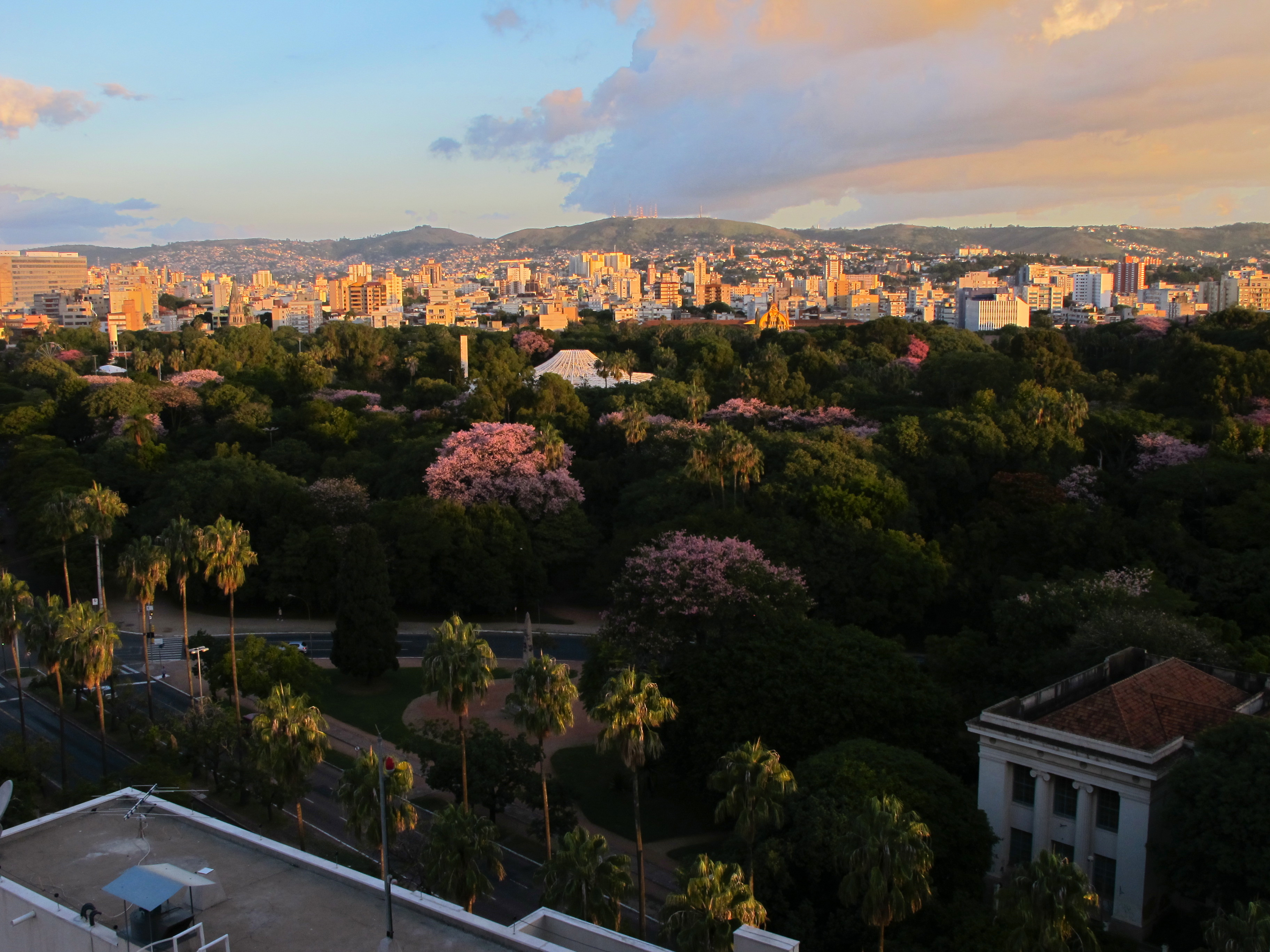
Aerial view of Farroupilha Park vegetation

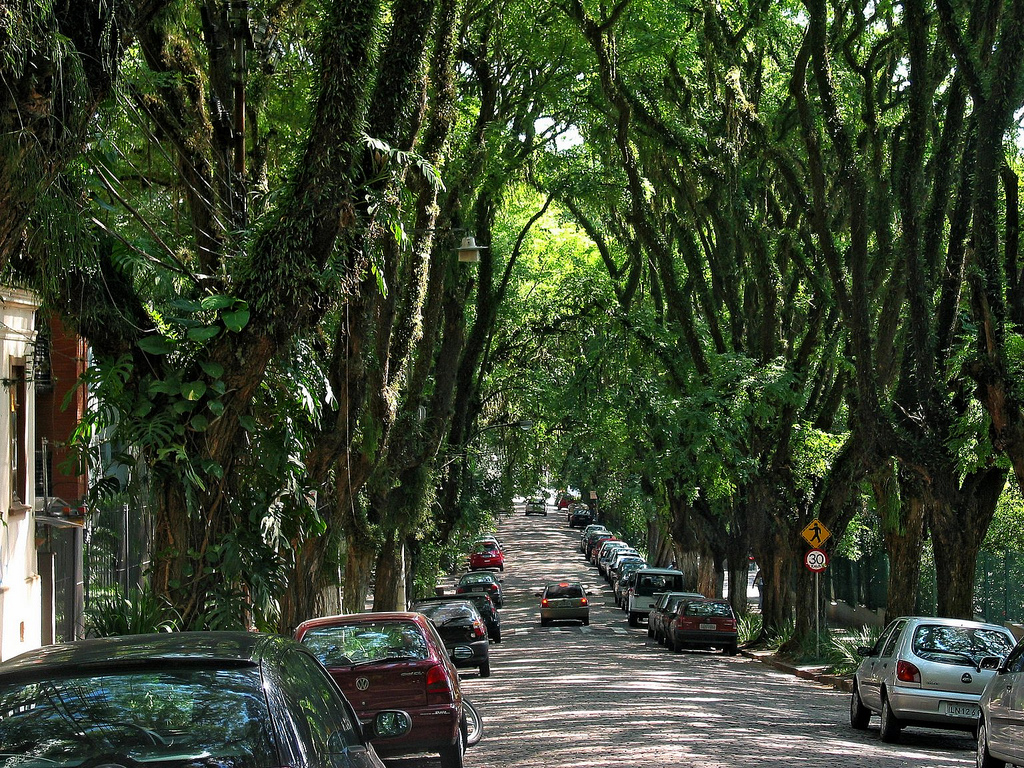
Tipuana on Gonçalo de Carvelho Street

Porto Alegre lies in a transitional area between the subtropical forest and the Southern Brazilian grasslands (pampa). A number of conservation programmes have been established to protect native trees. Many of the city's avenues have been planted with different tree species. One striking example of this is Teresópolis Avenue, where bottle trees have been planted. The city is covered in green vegetation and Lapacho and Jacaranda are the main species that can be found locally. The trees from the hills are protected. Two environmental conservation areas can be found in this city: "Delta do Jacuí" (Jacuí Delta) State Park and Lami Biological Reserve.

The urban area has many parks and plazas, making Porto Alegre one of the greenest provincial capitals in Brazil. The first city squares date from the second half of the 18th century and were originally large public spaces used as food markets. The city has 39 km^{2} (9,600 acres) of green space, occupying 31 percent of the city's area. This is an average of 17.6 m^{2} per person. More than one million trees line the public streets and SMAM plants an average of 30,000 seedlings each year. The four main parks are: Parque Farroupilha, a 37-hectare (91-acre) park; Jardim Botânico (The Botanical Garden of Porto Alegre), with some 725 species of vegetation on about 43 hectares (110 acres) of land; and Parque Marinha do Brasil (The Brazilian Navy's Park), a vast park of more than 70 hectares (170 acres) which offers a wide variety of sports fields and tracks. The city's cycleway is called the Caminho dos Parques, which at over 5 km (3 miles) long links the Moinhos do Vento, Farroupilha and Guaíba shore parks.

The Lami José Lutzenberger Biological Reserve was established in 1975 in the Lami neighborhood of Porto Alegre, named after the local agronomist and environmentalist José Lutzenberger. It was the first municipal reserve in Brazil. The reserve covers 179 hectares (440 acres). It reopened in April 2002 after being closed for more than ten years to allow its ecosystems to recover. The reserve conserves nature and supports research and environmental education.

=== Water ===
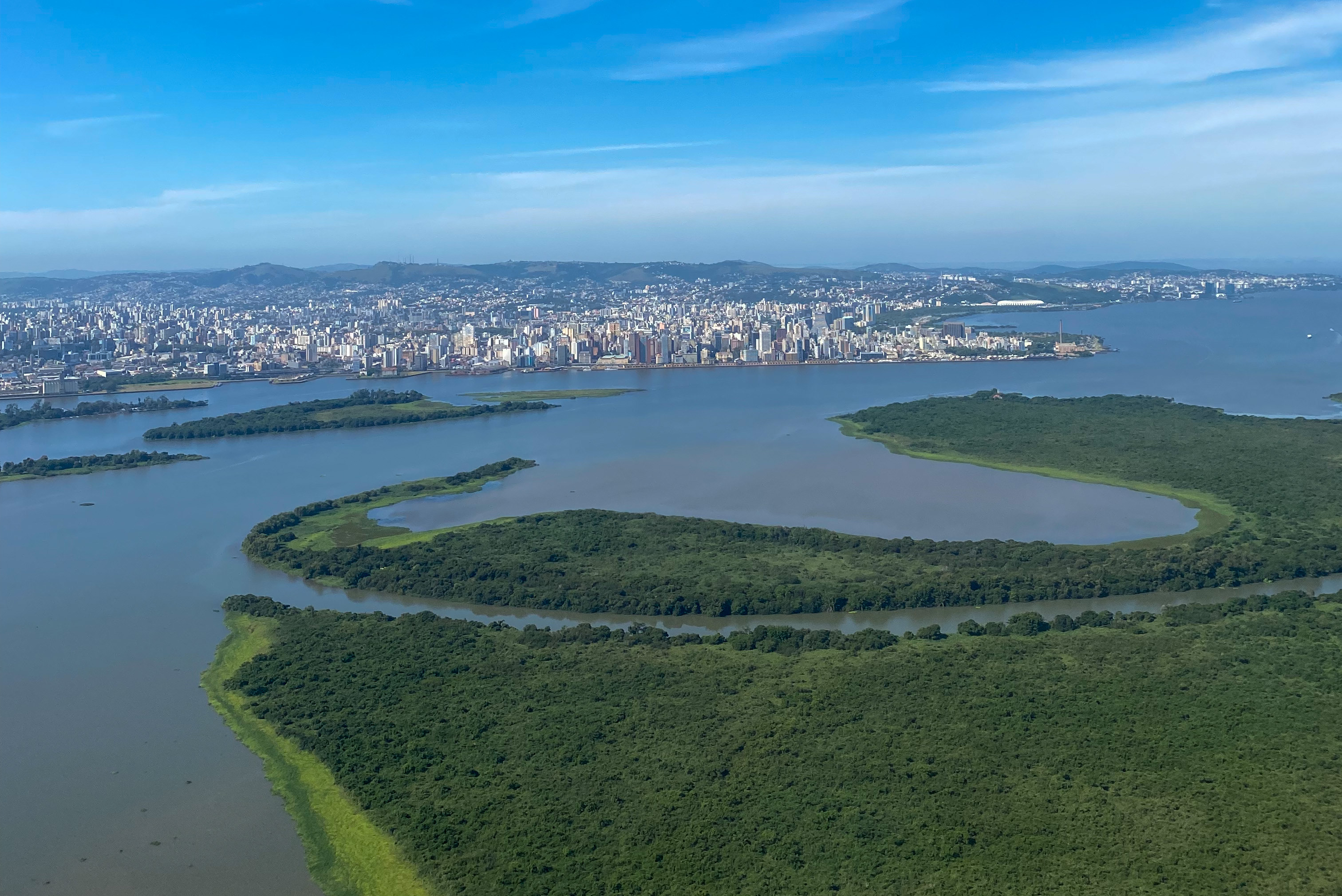
Aerial view of Porto Alegre and Guaíba Lake basin

Sewer service is available to 87.7 percent of the city, and 100 percent of the population is serviced by treated water. While in most Brazilian cities the water is supplied by large state companies, in Porto Alegre the Municipal Department of Water and Sanitation Services, (DMAE) is the provider. It is the largest municipal water supplier in the country and enjoys operational autonomy and financial independence. As a separate entity from the municipal government it can make its own decisions on how to invest the revenues it collects, and such decisions are not directly subject to interference from the municipality. It receives no subsidies and makes no payments to the municipality itself. As a municipal undertaking, DMAE enjoys tax-exempt status, which allows it to keep water prices lower.

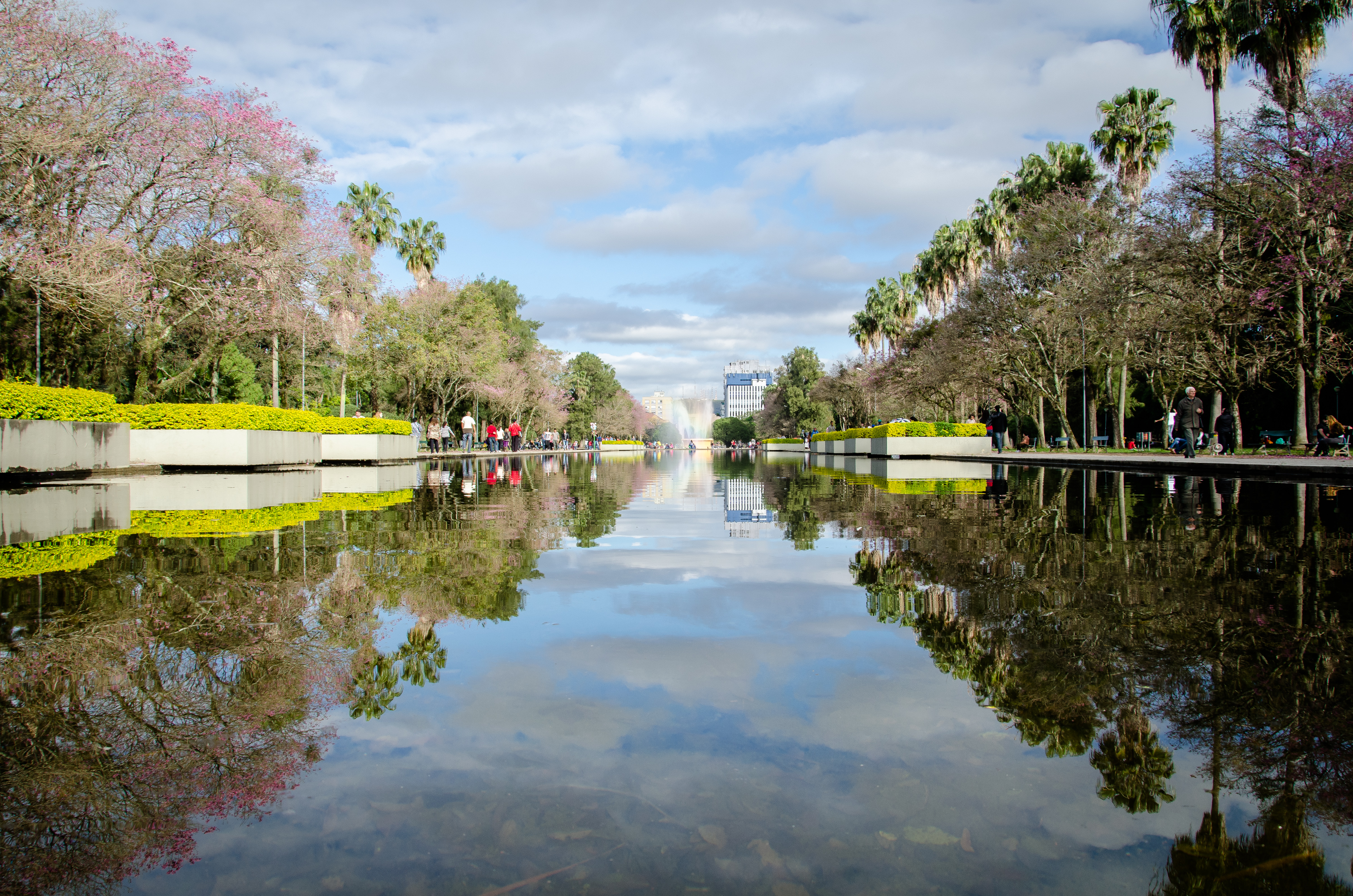
Water mirrors in the Redenção Park

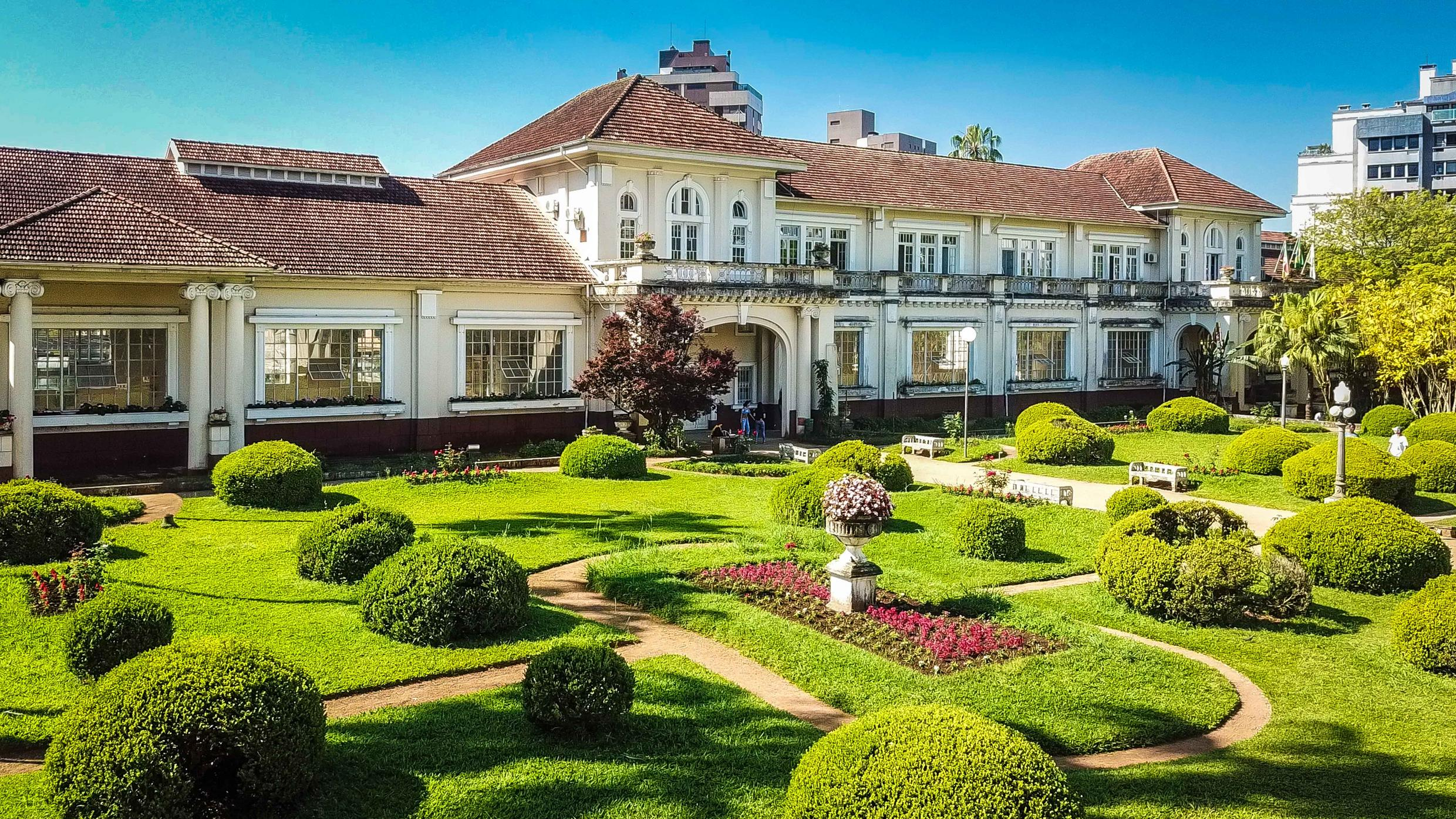
DMAE Headquarters, where the Moinhos de Vento Water Treatment Plant is located, supplying several Porto Alegre neighborhoods

In 2010, the Inter-American Development Bank (IDB) approved a US$83.2 million to support the Integrated Socioenvironmental Program of Porto Alegre. The program is carried out by the Municipal Department of Management and Strategic Support and its focus is on improving water quality in Guaíba Lake and the Cavalhada River, developing urban infrastructure to reduce flood risk along the Cavalhada River, improving the environmental management in the Municipality of Porto Alegre, and promoting efficient municipal water, sanitation and storm drainage services. This program improves the quality of life of the population of Porto Alegre by restoring water quality along the west side of Lake Guaíba and directly benefitting more than 700,000 residents through expanded public sanitation services and urban environmental improvement.

The Jacuí estuary contains the Jacuí Delta State Park, which in turn contains the Banhados do Delta Biological Reserve, a fully protected area which covers the islands of Pólvora and Pombas.

=== Air quality ===
Motor vehicles are responsible for the main atmospheric pollutant emissions. The city has the second worst air quality in Brazil, after only São Paulo. The use of new buses along dedicated busways has decreased pollutants as there is less idling time. SMAM (the Municipal Council of the Environment) has encouraged the use of the cleanest fuels and has played a role in monitoring pollution levels.

A partnership between SMAM, the Federal University of Rio Grande do Sul, the State Environmental Protection Foundation (FEPAM) and Petrobrás has created a network of five air monitoring stations in Porto Alegre. By utilizing a Petrobrás product called city diesel, sulphur levels in the air have dropped from 1.2 percent in 1989 to 0.5 percent. Hybrid buses which run on both diesel and electricity are also being considered for the future. Because Porto Alegre has a ready supply of natural gas, the city's taxi fleet is gradually being converted to it from gasoline.

== Demographics ==
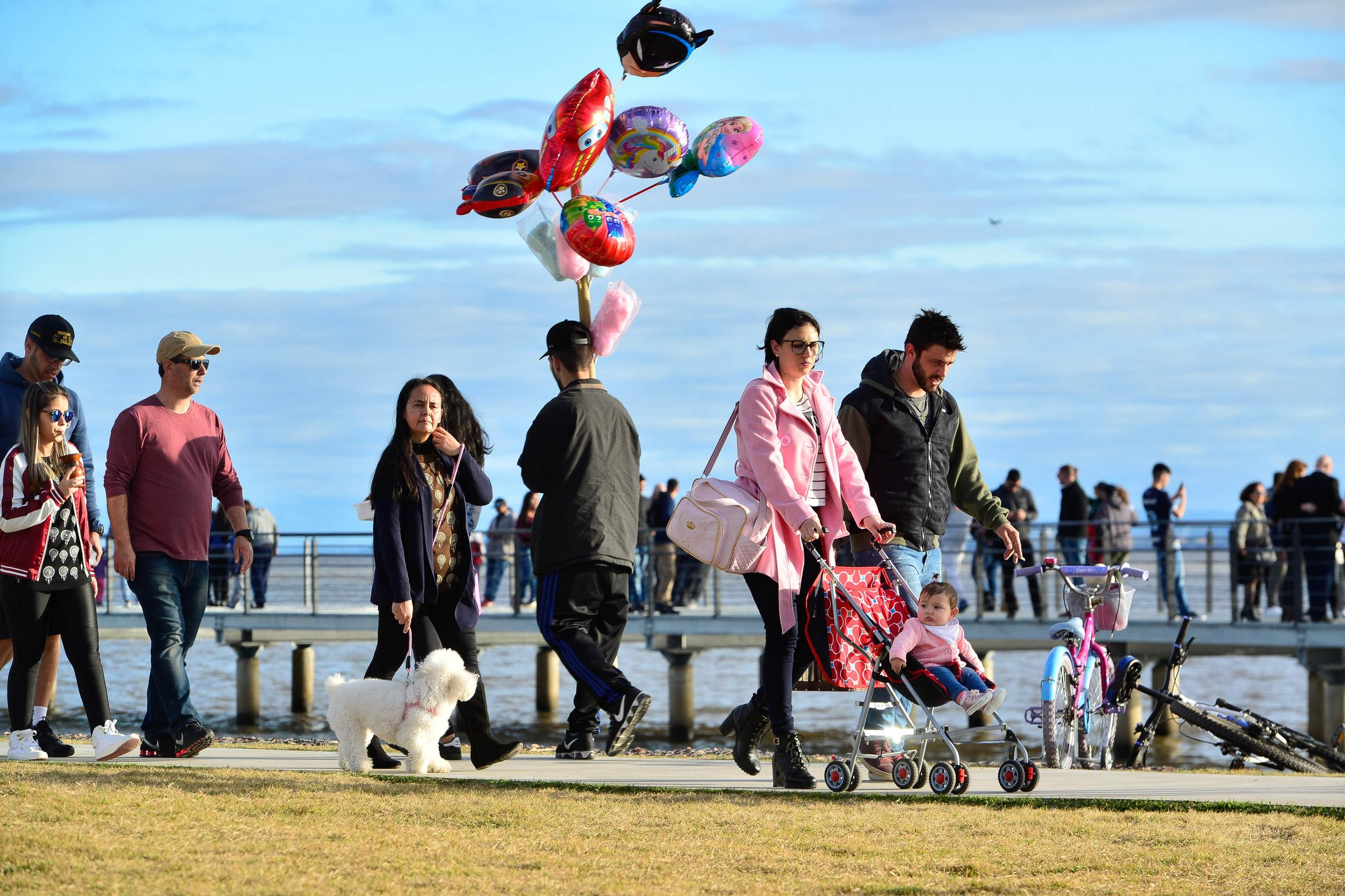
Sampling of the typical population of Porto Alegre.

=== Ethnic groups ===
Race and ethnicity in Porto Alegre
Ethnicity	Percentage
White	73.6%
Pardo (Multiracial)	13.4%
Black	12.6%
Amerindian	0.2%
Asian	0.2%

According to the 2022 census, there were 1,332,845 people residing in the city of Porto Alegre. The census revealed the following numbers: 981,251 White people (73.6%), 178,354 Pardo (Multiracial) people (13.4%), 168,196 Black people (12.6%), 2,708 Amerindian people (0.2%), 2,306 Asian people (0.2%). In 2010, the city of Porto Alegre was the 10th most populous city in Brazil. In 2010, the city had 269,519 opposite-sex couples and 1,401 same-sex couples. The population of Porto Alegre was 53.6% female and 46.4% male.

Porto Alegre is mostly composed of Brazilians of European descent. Its settlement started in the mid-18th century, mostly with the arrival of Portuguese colonists from the Azores Islands. From 1748 to 1756, 2,300 Azoreans were sent to the region by the King of Portugal to protect Southern Brazil from neighbouring invaders. These colonists, mostly composed of married couples, established the city of Porto dos Casais (literally translated "harbor of the couples"), nowadays Porto Alegre. In 1775, 55% of Rio Grande do Sul's population was of Azorean Portuguese origin. Porto Alegre was composed mainly of Azoreans and their African slaves until the first half of the 19th century.

Religion in Porto Alegre (2010)
1. Catholic Church (63.9%)
2. Protestantism (11.7%)
3. Spiritism (7.03%)
4. Umbanda and Candomblé (3.35%)
5. Other religions (3.64%)
6. Irreligious (10.4%)

Other than the Portuguese, the first Europeans to settle Rio Grande do Sul were German immigrants. In 1824, the first immigrants from Germany arrived in Porto Alegre, but they were sent to what is now the city of São Leopoldo (28 km (17 mi) away). From 1824 to 1914, 50,000 Germans arrived in Rio Grande do Sul. Most of these colonists had rural communities in the countryside of the state as their first destination. The large rural exodus in Brazil in the early 20th century brought many originally German migrants from the countryside into Porto Alegre and, nowadays, they compose a large percentage of the population.

The second largest group of immigrants who arrived in Porto Alegre were the Italians. They started emigrating to Brazil in 1875, mainly from the Northern Italian Veneto region. As with the Germans, Italians were also first sent to rural communities, mainly in the Serra Gaúcha region. After some decades, many of them started to migrate to other parts of Rio Grande do Sul, including Porto Alegre. Minority communities of immigrants, such as Central Europeans from Poland and Eastern Europeans from Ukraine and Jews; Arabs from Palestine, Lebanon and Syria; Asians from Japan; as well as Spaniards arriving after the Civil War also made Porto Alegre their home. According to an autosomal DNA genetic study from 2011, the ancestral composition of the population of Porto Alegre is: 77.70% European, 12.70% African and 9.60% Native American.

=== Metropolitan Region ===
The Metropolitan Region of Porto Alegre (RMPA), created in 1973, currently has 4,311,019 inhabitants and is the most densely populated area in the state, concentrating 38.2% of the population in 34 municipalities, nine of which have more than 100,000 inhabitants. The population density of the region is 480.62 inhabitants/km². These municipalities show significant disparities in terms of GDP per capita and social indicators, with an uneven distribution of economic agents and urban infrastructure such as transportation, health, education, housing, and sanitation. Its territory is divided into five Regional Development Councils: Metropolitano-Delta do Jacuí, Vale dos Sinos, Paranhana-Encosta da Serra, Centro-Sul, and Vale do Caí. The entire Great Porto Alegre is currently an immigration hub in the state, attracting many people due to lower land prices and employment opportunities in areas of economic expansion.

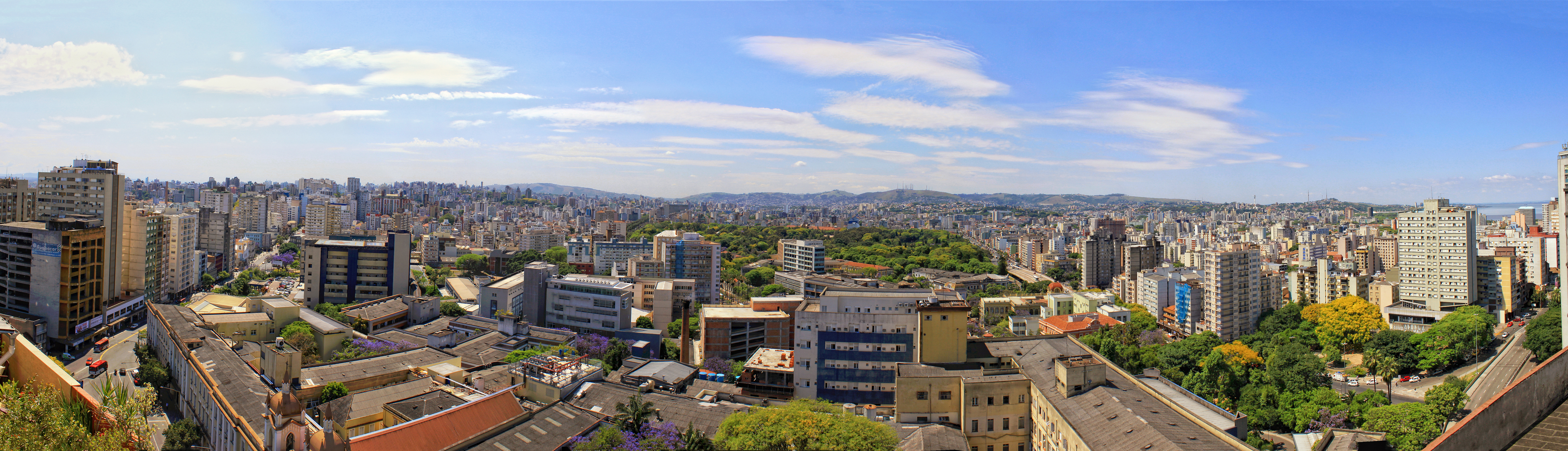
Panoramic view of Cidade Baixa, Santana and Bom Fim neighbourhoods, in the Central Zone of Porto Alegre

=== Population growth ===
Changing population of the city of Porto Alegre

Year	Pop.	±%
1800	6,000	—
1822	12,000	+100.0%
1872	43,998	+266.7%
1890	52,421	+19.1%
1900	73,647	+40.5%

Year	Pop.	±%
1920	179,263	+143.4%
1940	272,232	+51.9%
1950	394,151	+44.8%
1960	635,125	+61.1%
1970	885,545	+39.4%

Year	Pop.	±%
1980	1,125,477	+27.1%
1991	1,263,403	+12.3%
2000	1,360,590	+7.7%
2010	1,409,351	+3.6%
2016	1,481,019	+5.1%

Source: Planet Barsa Ltda.

=== Religion ===
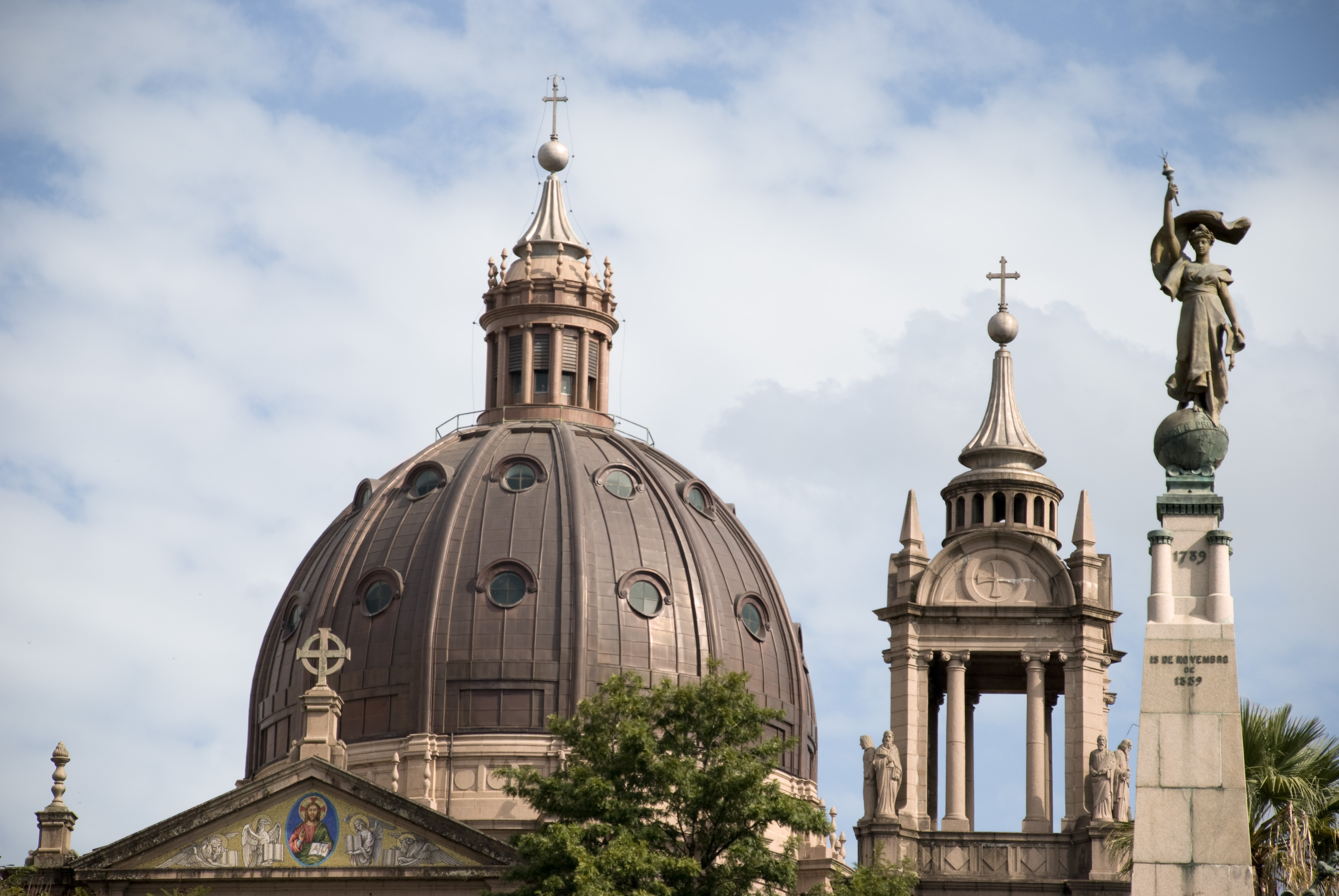
Dome of the Metropolitan Cathedral of Porto Alegre

According to the 2010 population census, the population of Porto Alegre is made up of Roman Catholics (63.85%); Protestants or evangelicals (11.65%); spiritists (7.03%); Umbanda and Candomblé (3.35%); the unreligious (10.38%) and people of other religions (3.64%).

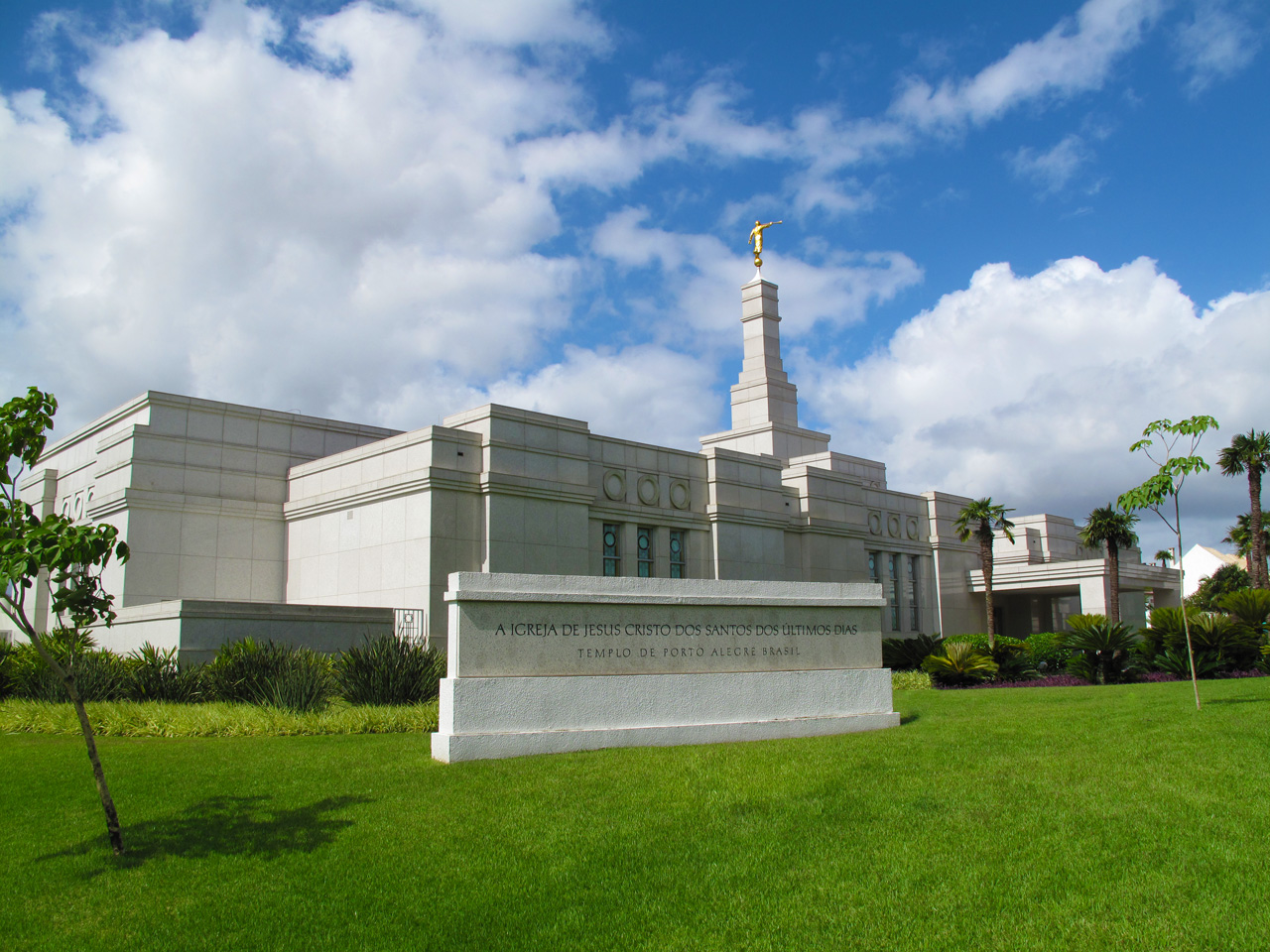
Mormon Temple of Porto Alegre

Catholicism has lost proportionally fewer followers in Porto Alegre than in other Brazilian capitals. Missionary evangelicals are experiencing a slight decline, and in absolute numbers, Lutherans are the overwhelming majority; Pentecostals, although their numbers are on the rise, still have the smallest proportion among all Brazilian capitals, except for Teresina, and their growth rate is the slowest of all the capitals. The most important branches of Pentecostalism in the capital of Rio Grande do Sul are the Assembly of God and the Universal Church of the Kingdom of God.

The Church of Jesus Christ of Latter-day Saints has a temple in Porto Alegre.

=== Crime ===
The number of violent crimes has been dropping steadily since 2018.

== Politics, government and citizenship ==
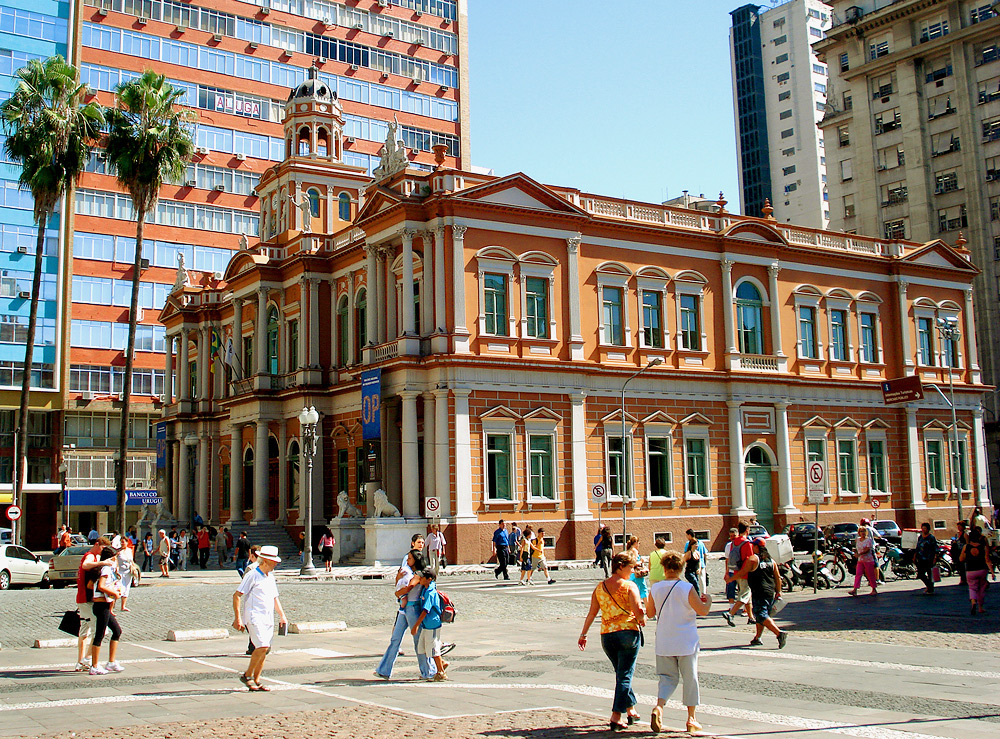
Porto Alegre City Hall

The executive branch is headed by the mayor of the municipality, which includes departments and other public administration bodies directly and indirectly. The legislature is represented by the City Council.

It hosted the first three editions of the World Social Forum in 2001, 2002 and 2003. The third edition attracted 20,763 delegates from 130 countries, with a total audience of 100,000 people from all parts of the world.

=== Participatory budgeting ===
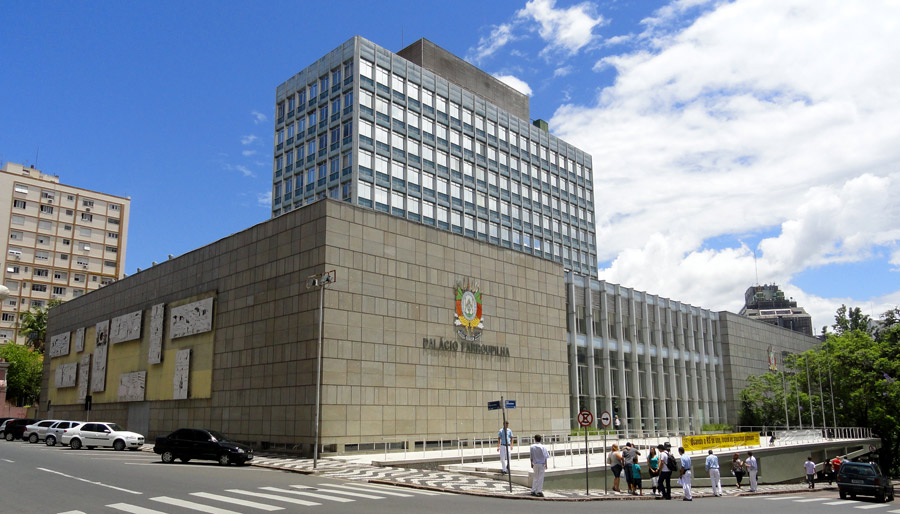
Legislative Assembly of Rio Grande do Sul

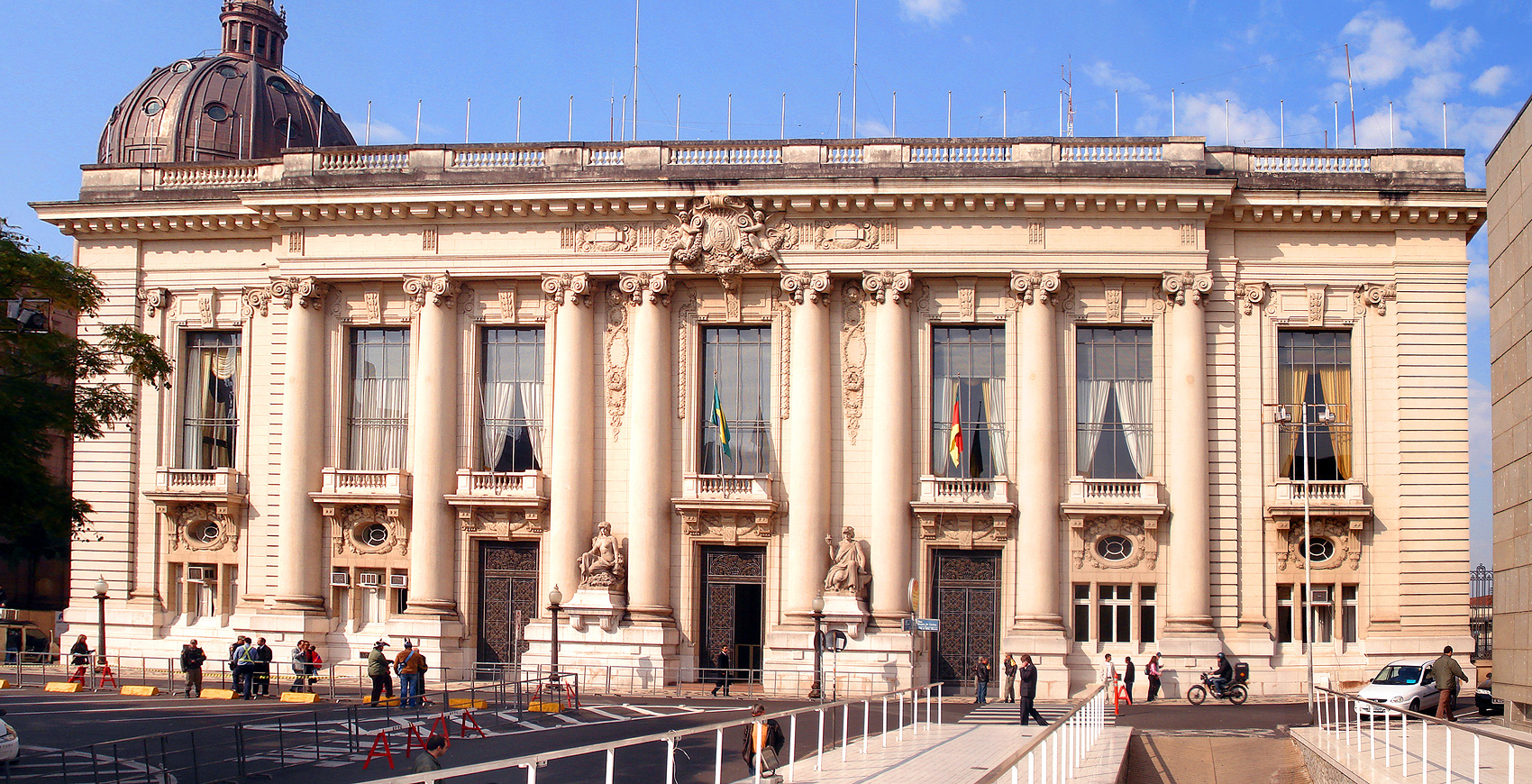
Piratini Palace

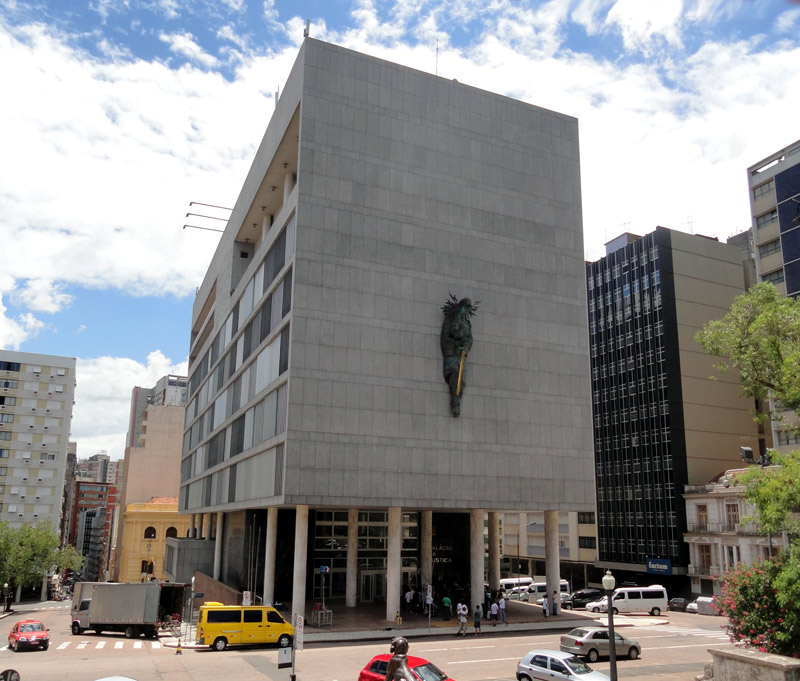
Justice Court of Rio Grande do Sul

A feature of public administration in Porto Alegre is the adoption of a system of popular participation in the definition of public investment, called the Participatory Budget. The first full participatory budgeting process was developed in the city starting in 1989. Participatory budgeting in its most meaningful form took place in the city from 1991 to 2004. Participatory budgeting was part of a number of innovative reform programs to overcome severe inequality in living standards amongst city residents. One third of the city's residents lived in isolated slums at the city outskirts, lacking access to public amenities (water, sanitation, health care facilities, and schools).

Participatory budgeting in Porto Alegre has occurred annually, starting with a series of neighborhood, regional, and citywide assemblies, where residents and elected budget delegates identify spending priorities and vote on which priorities to implement. Porto Alegre spent about 200 million dollars per year on construction and services, This money is subject to participatory budgeting, unlike the annual spending on fixed expenses such as debt service and pensions, which is not subject to public participation. Around fifty thousand residents of Porto Alegre took part at the peak of the participatory budgeting process (compared to 1.5 million city inhabitants), with the number of participants having grown year on year since 1989. Participants are from diverse economic and political backgrounds. Although participatory budgeting appears to continue in the city today, two prominent scholars on the process have stated that "after the defeat of the Workers' Party in late 2004, a politically conservative coalition maintained the surface features of PB while returning the actual functioning of the administration to more traditional modes of favor-trading and the favoring of local elites."

The participatory budgeting cycle starts in January and runs throughout the year in many assemblies in each of the city's 16 districts, dealing with many areas of interest to urban life. The meetings elect delegates to represent specific neighborhoods. The mayor and staff attend, in order to respond to citizens' concerns. In the following months, delegates meet to review technical project criteria and district needs.

City department staff may participate according to their area of expertise. At a second regional plenary, regional delegates prioritize the district's demands and elect 42 councillors representing all districts and thematic areas to serve on the Municipal Council of the Budget. The main function of the Municipal Council of the Budget is to reconcile the demands of each district with available resources, and to propose and approve an overall municipal budget. The resulting budget is binding, though the city council can suggest, but not require, changes. Only the Mayor may veto the budget, or remand it back to the Municipal Council of the Budget (this has never happened).

A World Bank paper suggests that participatory budgeting has led to direct improvements in facilities in Porto Alegre. For example, sewer and water connections increased from 75% of households in 1988 to 98% in 1997. The number of schools quadrupled since 1986. According to Fedozzi and Costa, this system has been recognized as a successful experience of interaction between people and the official administrative spheres in public administration and, as such, has gained a broad impact on the political scene nationally and internationally, being interpreted as a strategy for the establishment of an active citizenship in Brazil. The distribution of investment resources planning that follows a part of the statement of priorities for regional or thematic meetings, culminating with the approval of an investment plan that works and activities program broken down by investment sector, by region and around the city. Also according to Fedozzi, this favors:

The high number of participants, after more than a decade, suggests that participatory budgeting encourages increasing citizen involvement, according to the paper. Also, Porto Alegre's health and education budget increased from 13% (1985) to almost 40% (1996), and the share of the participatory budget in the total budget increased from 17% (1992) to 21% (1999).

Despite being the pioneering experiment of participatory budgeting, Porto Alegre like many other examples does not have guaranteed sustainability. The positive impact has dwindled since 2004 due to funding changes and decreasing government commitment. Participatory budgeting has been suspended in Porto Alegre since 2017

== Economy ==
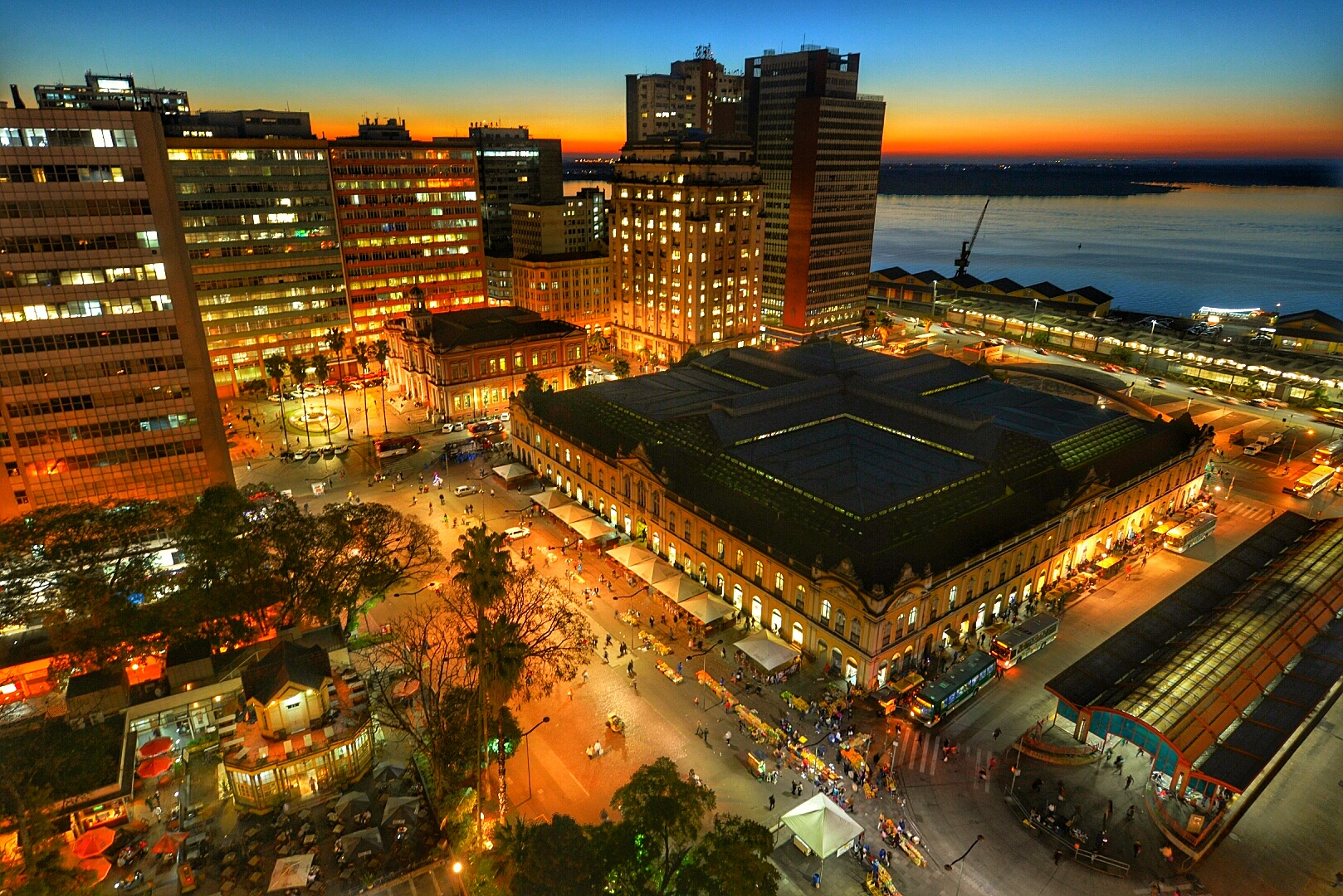
The Public Market of Porto Alegre

Located at the junction of five rivers, it has become an important alluvial port as well as one of the chief industrial and commercial centres in Brazil. Products of the rich agricultural and pastoral hinterland, such as soybeans, leather, canned beef, and rice, are exported from Porto Alegre to destinations as far away as Africa and Japan.

Among the main businesses located in Porto Alegre are Gerdau, Petroleo Ipiranga, Zaffari and RBS. Since 2000, General Motors (GM) is operating in Gravataí, located in the Metropolitan Region. Also in this Region but in Triunfo, there is a Petrochemical Pool, and in Eldorado do Sul Dell Computers has established a plant. In the health sector, the three hospitals: Hospital Moinhos de Vento, which is a private, JCAH-accredited hospital, Santa Casa de Misericordia Hospital and Clinicas Hospital, public, are considered among the best in Latin America. The latter are university-affiliated, referral hospitals for the South of Brazil. Commerce is a very important economic activity, with many malls (like Praia de Belas Shopping, Shopping Iguatemi and the smaller though posh Shopping Moinhos). The Metropolitan Region of Porto Alegre, directed to the production of shoes (around Novo Hamburgo) and to petrochemical industries, as well as services.

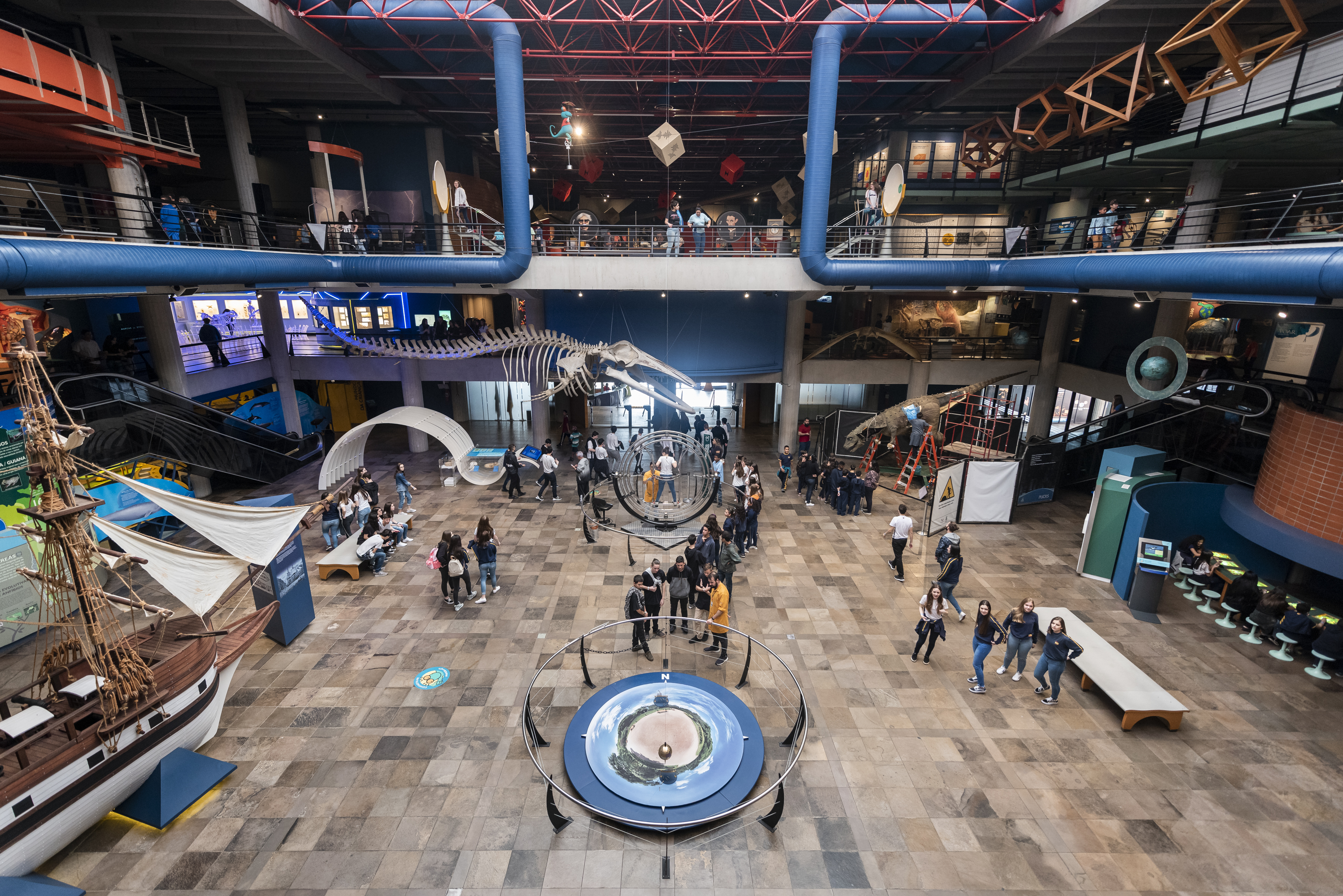
PUCRS Museum of Science and Technology

In the city is located the Electronics Technology Center (CEITEC), focused on the development and production of application specific integrated circuits (ASICs), today announced the opening of Latin America's first IC design center. To create state-of-the-art semiconductor products for high-volume markets that will be consumed in Latin America as well as exported to global markets. CEITEC S.A will accelerate the growth of Latin America's electronics industry by leveraging Brazil's regional influence, leadership and economic strength. The company will add 60 engineers to its ranks who will design RFID, digital media and wireless communication chips for its fabrication facility now ramping up for production. The total investment by the Brazilian government is almost US$210 million. The company is implementing a fab-lite strategy with the ability to manufacture analog/digital chips at its facility in Porto Alegre. The in-house design center with more than 100 engineers.

The GDP for the city was R$30,116,002,000 (2006). The per capita income for the city was R$20,900 (2006).

== Sustainability programs ==
=== Energy ===
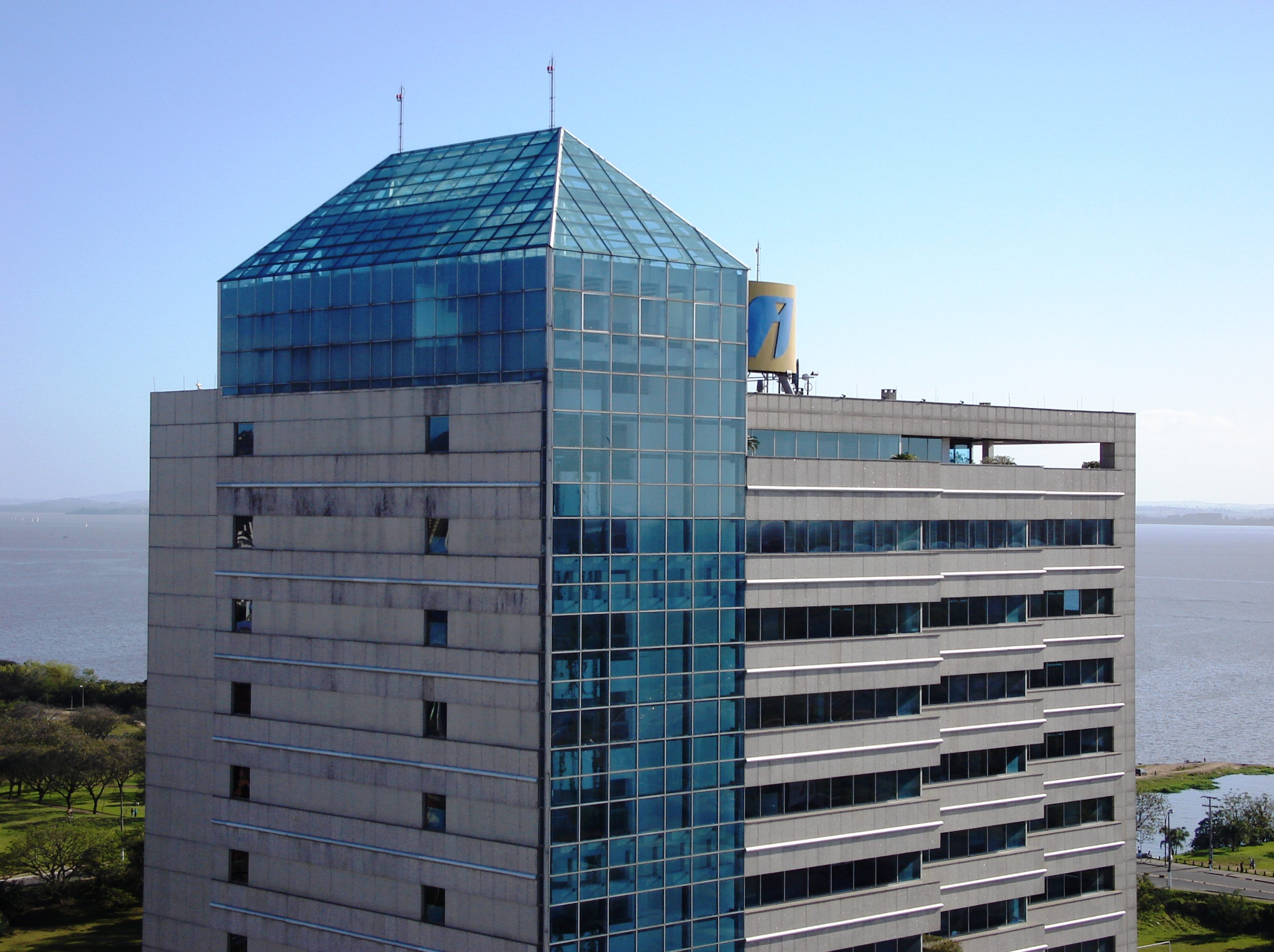
Ipiranga headquarters in Porto Alegre

In Brazil, there are also a few coal-fired plants, fuel-oil fired plants and one nuclear facility. Increased utilization of natural gas and other sources is planned in order to reduce Brazil's overdependence on hydroelectric power. In 1999, a natural gas pipeline from Bolivia to Brazil was completed, with its terminus in Porto Alegre. Brazilian investment group Central Termoeletrica Sul (CTSul) has plans to invest US$698 million in a 650MW coal-fired power generation plant in Cachoeira do Sul, located in Rio Grande do Sul.

The largest wind energy park in Brazil, which is being built east of Porto Alegre in Osório, will add 150 megawatts (MW) to the Brazilian energy matrix. The production represents 5 percent of the energy consumed in the state of Rio Grande do Sul and would be sufficient to meet two-thirds of Porto Alegre's energy demands. The Farm opened in 2008 with 75 2MW turbines and has been approved for a 300MW expansion which would make it the largest wind farm in the region. The project is part of the Alternative Energy Sources Program (Proinfa) from state-owned Eletrobrás, which will purchase the energy produced for the next 20 years.

=== Recycling ===
Porto Alegre was one of the first cities in Brazil to develop a recycling program and has been acknowledged as having the best management practices in the country. The city produces about 1,600 tonnes of household waste per day. Since 1997, all non-recyclable waste has been disposed of in landfill sites. Infiltration into the soil is prevented by the double-walled construction of a clay layer and a high-density polythene geo-membrane, the lowering of the water table and the draining off and treatment of any effluent.

== Tourism and recreation ==
The area includes attractions such as the Piratini Palace, the seat of the state Government, Porto Alegre Botanical Garden, Moinhos de Vento Park the Public Market and Farroupilha Park

=== Nightlife ===
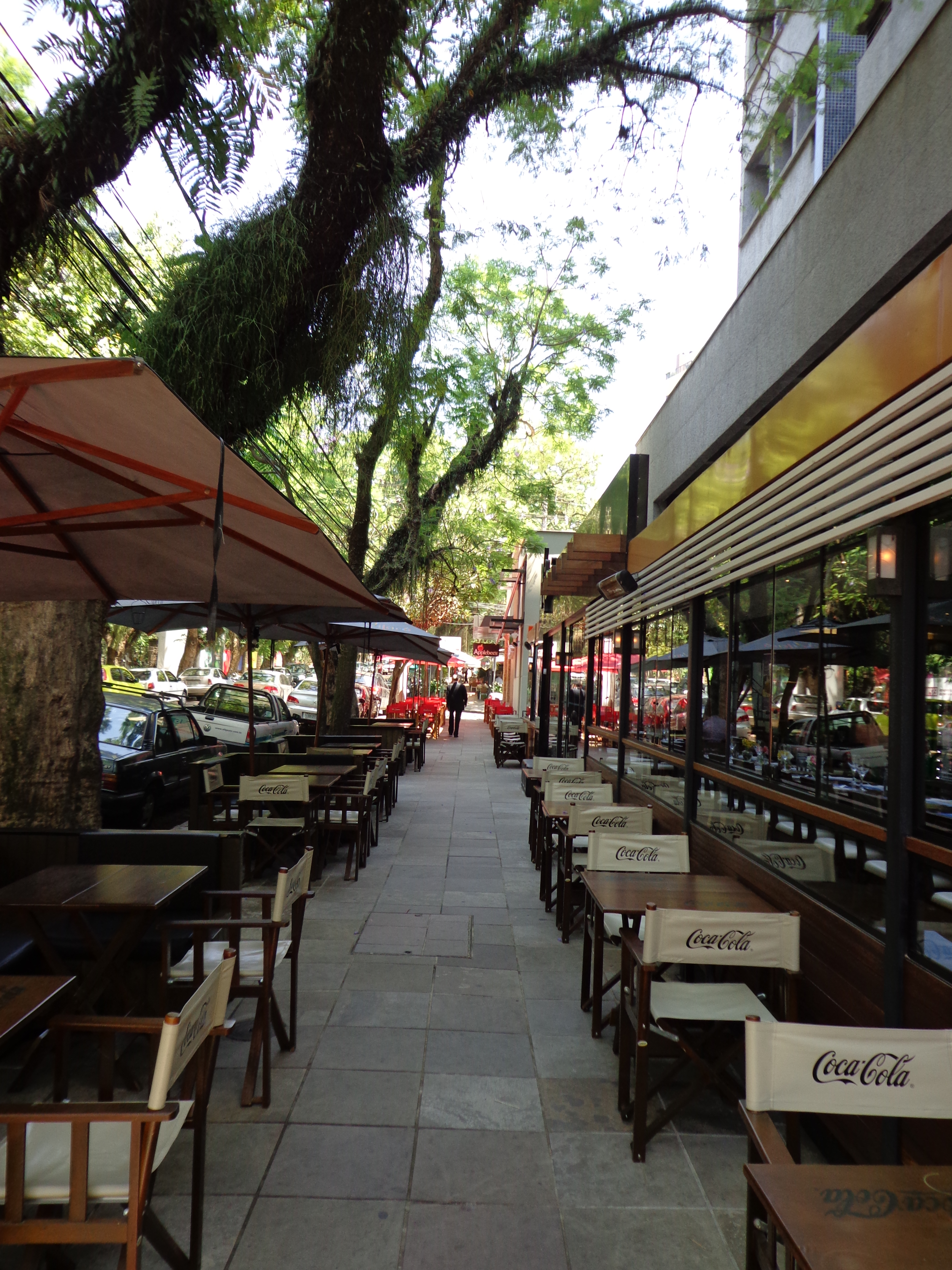
Pubs on Calçada da Fama during the day

Porto Alegre is known in Brazil for its nightlife. The city's clubs, pubs, bars and restaurants provide entertainment for a range of tastes and budgets, going from the corner bar to all-night raves, and nightclubs. In the "SoHo" area of Porto Alegre, there is a block full of bars, restaurants and clubs.

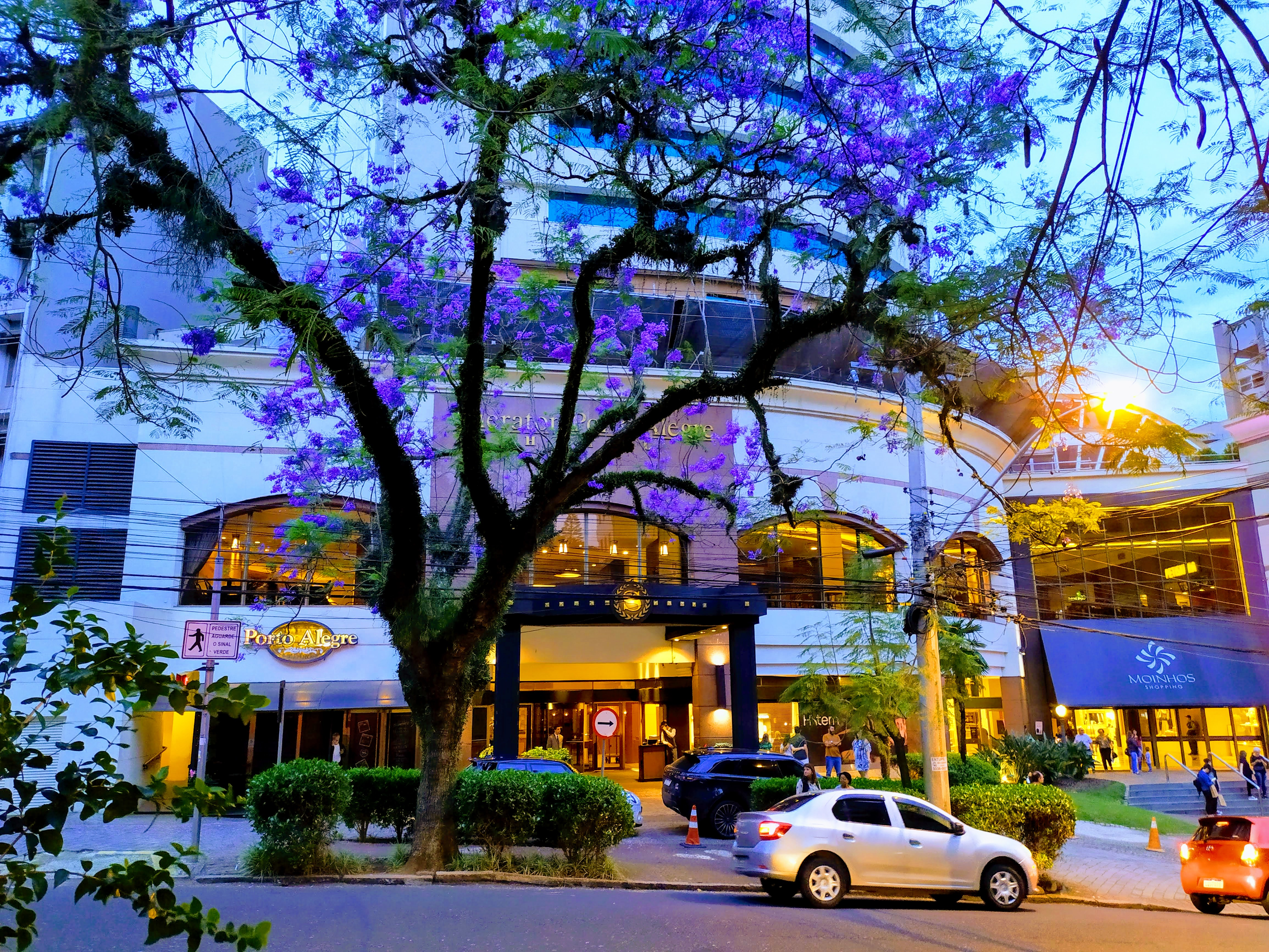
Moinhos de Vento neighborhood is known for its vibrant social life, with a large number of cafés, bars, luxury stores and nightclubs

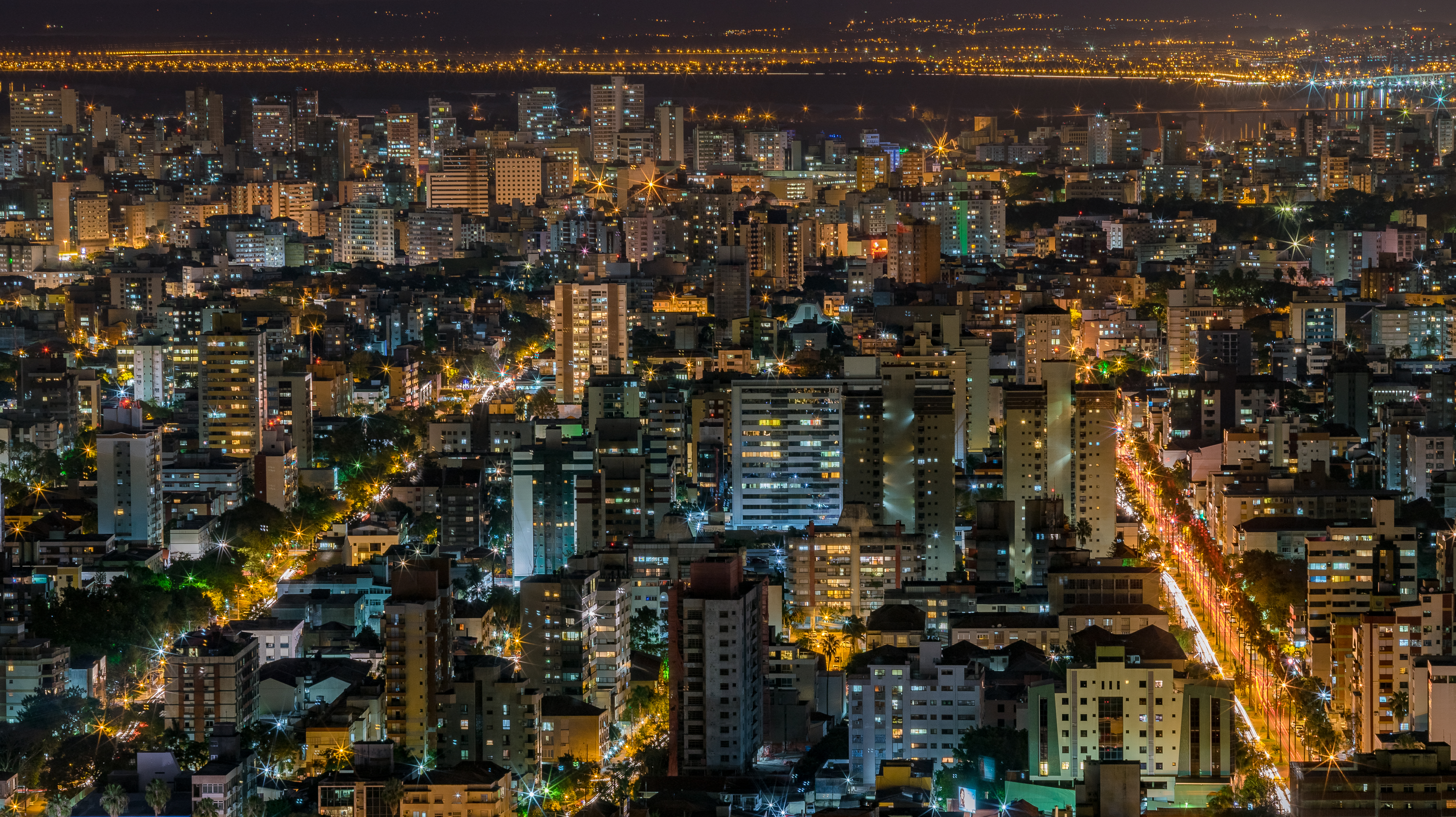
The city at night

In Cidade Baixa (translates as "Lower City") neighborhood, the historical street João Alfredo has many options including discotheques. From MPB (Brazilian popular music) to rock music, historical street João Alfredo has many options to dance and have fun. A fictionalized view of the Porto Alegre nightlife could be seen in the Érico Verissimo's novel Noite.

Near Oswaldo Aranha street, in the Farroupilha Park, the Araujo Viana Auditorium is an auditorium for concerts, performances and meetings. Designed by architects Moacir Moojen e Carlos Fayet, was inaugurated in March 1964, making it an important space for cultural events. The original project for the auditorium was built where nowadays Legislative Assembly is, however, it was relocated to the Farroupilha Park in 1964.

== Education ==
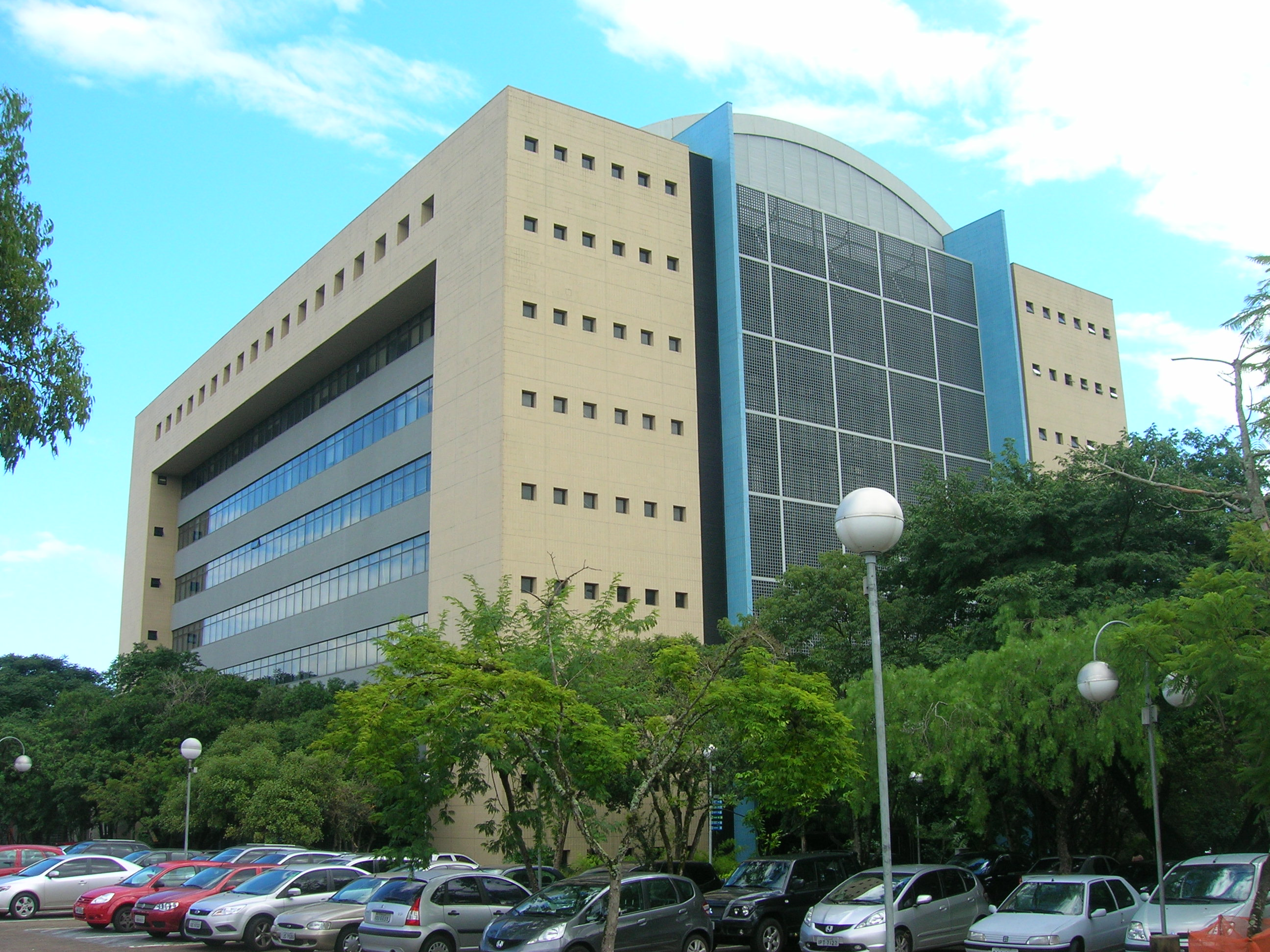
IT School of Pontifical Catholic University of Rio Grande do Sul in Porto Alegre

Educational institutions in the area include Universidade Federal de Ciências da Saúde de Porto Alegre (a.k.a. UFCSPA), Universidade Federal do Rio Grande do Sul (a.k.a. UFRGS), Pontifícia Universidade Católica do Rio Grande do Sul (a.k.a. PUC), Universidade do Vale do Rio dos Sinos (a.k.a. Unisinos) and Centro Universitário Ritter dos Reis.

=== Educational system ===
There are three important universities in Porto Alegre: the Federal University of Health Sciences of Porto Alegre (UFCSPA), the Federal University of Rio Grande do Sul (UFRGS) and the Pontifical Catholic University of Rio Grande do Sul (PUCRS) all of which ranked among the top universities in Brazil and Latin America. UFRGS is also one of the three main universities in the country for post-graduation work. The PUCRS technological park – TECNOPUC – is one of the largest scientific and technological parks in Latin America with interaction of graduate courses, research and innovation. PUCRS is also one of the best universities for air transport and pilot formation in the world. Other very important universities are the Lutheran University of Brazil - (Universidade Luterana do Brasil) - ULBRA and UNISINOS, among other university centers.

=== Health ===
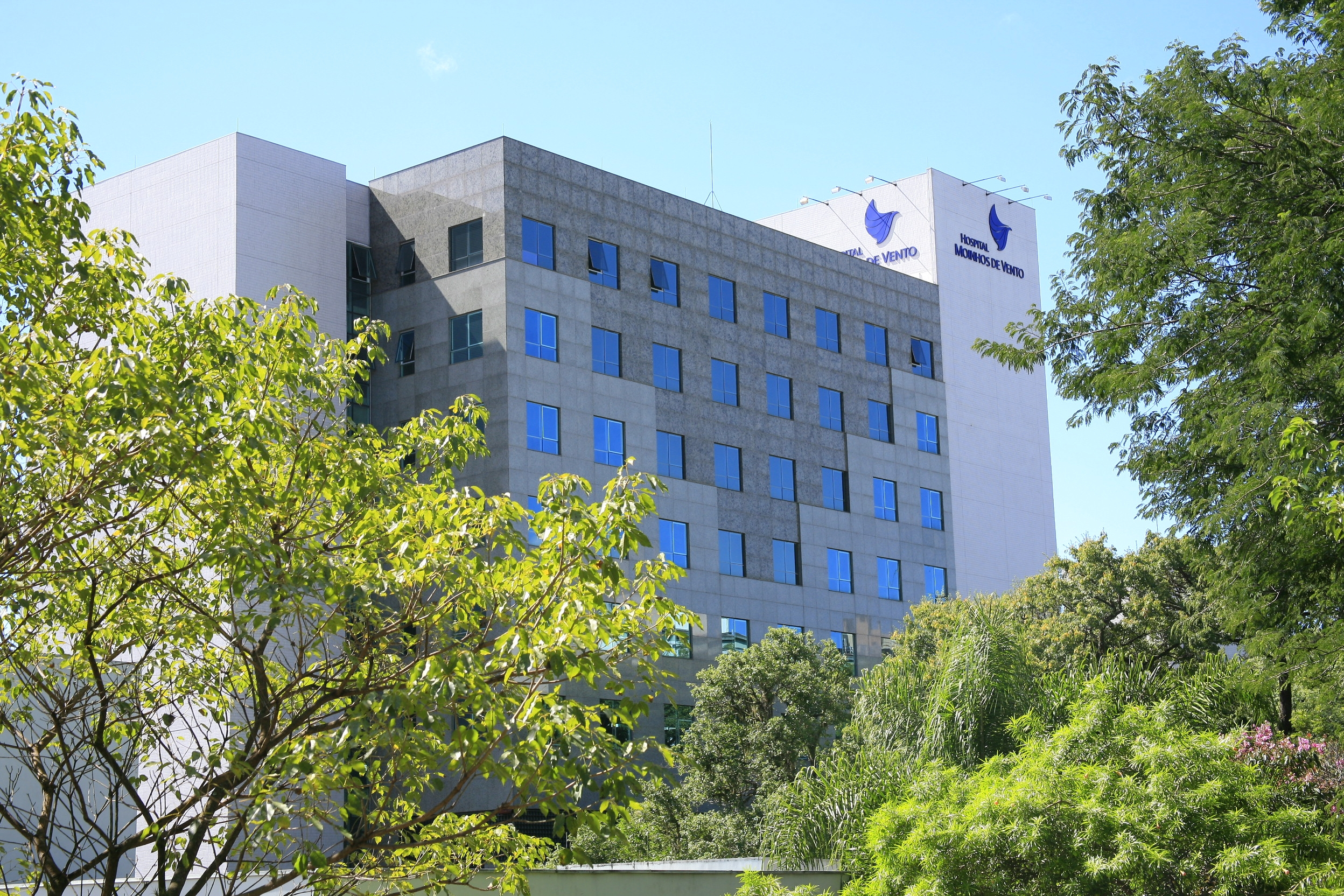
Moinhos de Vento Hospital is recognized by the Ministry of Health as one of the five excellent hospitals in Brazil and the only one in the Southern region of Brazil

In 2005, the city had a diverse set of healthcare facilities, totaling 519 establishments, of which 133 were public and 105 were municipal. Among these, 40 provided full hospitalization and 188 were linked to the Unified Health System (SUS). The total number of beds available was 7,701, with 1,542 being public and 271 of these being municipal. In terms of services, 365 establishments offered comprehensive outpatient care, 132 provided dental treatment, 33 had full emergency services, and 21 SUS-linked establishments had ICU units.

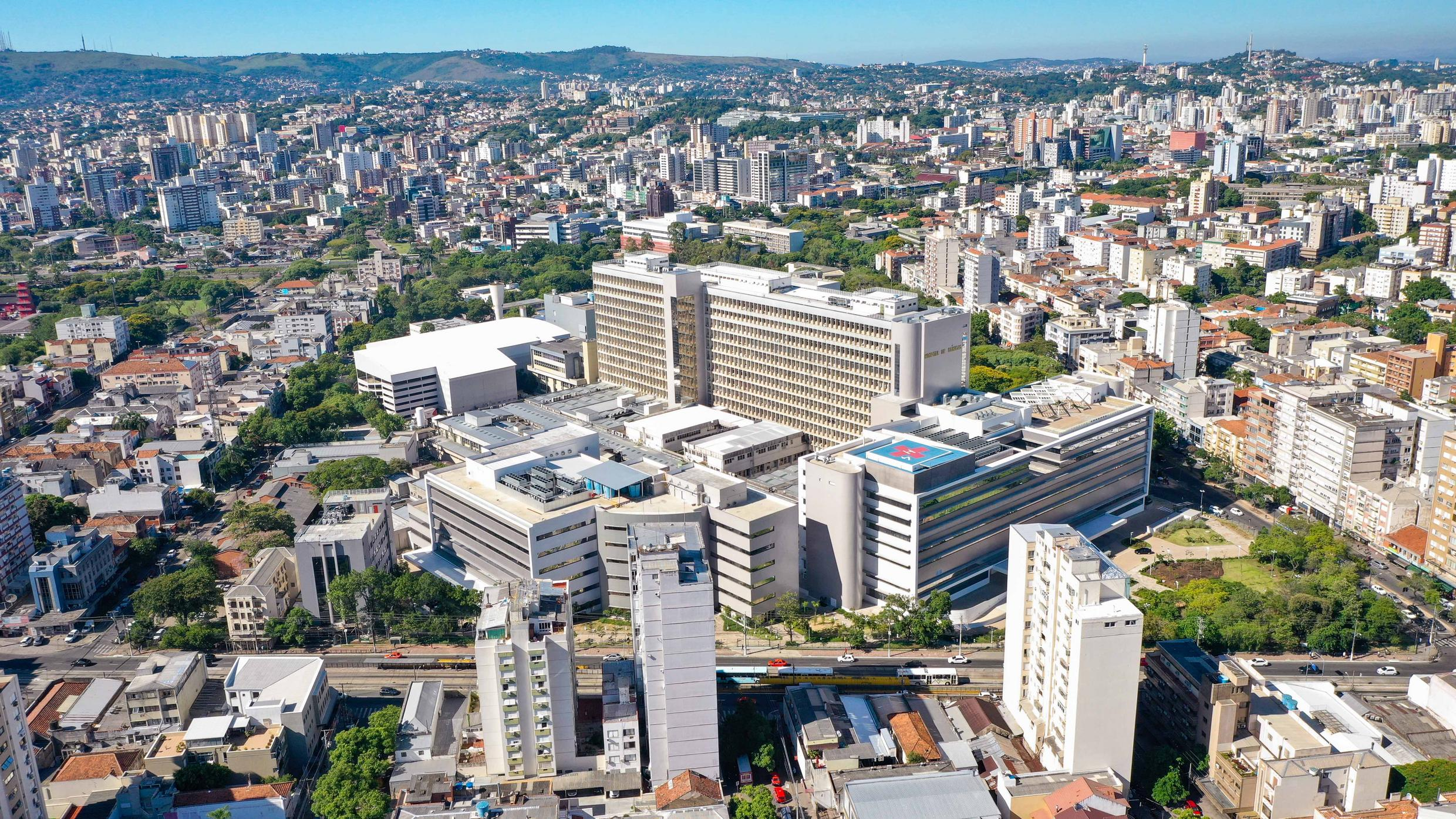
Clinics Hospital of Porto Alegre is considered a national reference in the treatment of various diseases

Additionally, several hospitals in the city received national recognition for their excellence in recent years. In 2001, Hospital Independência was awarded the Quality Hospital Award by SUS. The following year, in 2002, the Hospital de Clínicas de Porto Alegre, Hospital São Lucas from PUC-RS, the Institute of Cardiology of Rio Grande do Sul, and Policlínica Santa Clara of Santa Casa de Misericórdia were honored. Laboratory Weinmann also stood out by receiving the National Health Management Award – Gold Level in the Laboratory category for the 2003-2004 cycle.

Other nationally recognized institutions, either for their overall performance or specific specialties, include Hospital Psiquiátrico São Pedro, Hospital Moinhos de Vento, Hospital Nossa Senhora da Conceição, and Hospital Fêmina.

== Culture ==
=== Museums ===
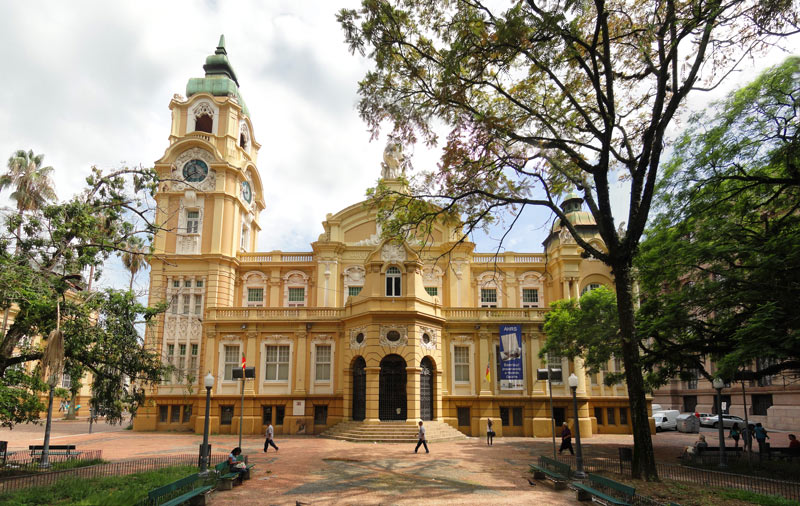
Memorial of Rio Grande do Sul

Rio Grande do Sul Museum of Art – MARGS

With an eclectic style, the building was designed by German architect Theo Wiederspahn. Originally it was the headquarters of the Fiscal Surveillance Agency of the Federal Revenue Office. Nowadays, it hosts the largest public collection of art works in Rio Grande do Sul.

Júlio de Castilhos Museum

Created in 1903, this is the oldest museum in the state. Its collection comprises thousands of pieces related to the local history, from Indian relics to objects and iconography about the Ragamuffin War and the Paraguayan War, including an important section showing fine sculptures from the Jesuitic Reductions.

Joaquim Felizardo Museum

This is an important museum with a large collection of archaeological artifacts and photographs of Porto Alegre's old times. Its historical building, dating from 1845 to 1855, is one of the few intact relics of colonial architecture inside the modern urban environment.

Rio Grande do Sul Memorial

This museum displays a huge collection of documents, maps, objects, prints and other items related to the state's history. Its building, designed by Theodor Wiederspahn, is one of the finest examples of eclectic architecture in the city.

Iberê Camargo Foundation

An iconic landmark in the southern part of Porto Alegre, the Iberê Camargo Foundation houses the permanent installation of gaucho artist Iberê Camargo. It also hosts traveling exhibitions which change several times a year. The building, designed by Portuguese architect Álvaro Siza was opened in 2008 and offers views of the Guaiba river as well as downtown Porto Alegre.

Luiz Carlos Prestes' Memorial

Projected by Oscar Niemeyer, the Luiz Carlos Prestes' Memorial is a recent addition to the city' cultural landscape. Besides the wall presentation of Prestes' life, a hall for cultural, social and political events is placed to the citizens of Porto Alegre.

=== Carnival/Carnaval ===
The Porto Alegre Carnival began in the 18th century with the entrudo, a prank brought over by the Portuguese from the Azores, whereby people threw flour, water, and "limão de cheiro" missiles at each other. At the end of the 19th century, two important Carnival associations were born. Rivalry between the two long dominated the city's Carnival. The corso, a parade of floats down Porto Alegre's streets, was a celebration enjoyed by the more well-to-do of the city's inhabitants.

One of the most important Carnival personalities is King Momo. At the beginning of Carnival, usually in February, he receives the keys to the city from the Mayor of Porto Alegre, symbolically governing the Carnival during the four days of revelry. Vincente Rao was the most popular King Momo.

=== Classical Music ===
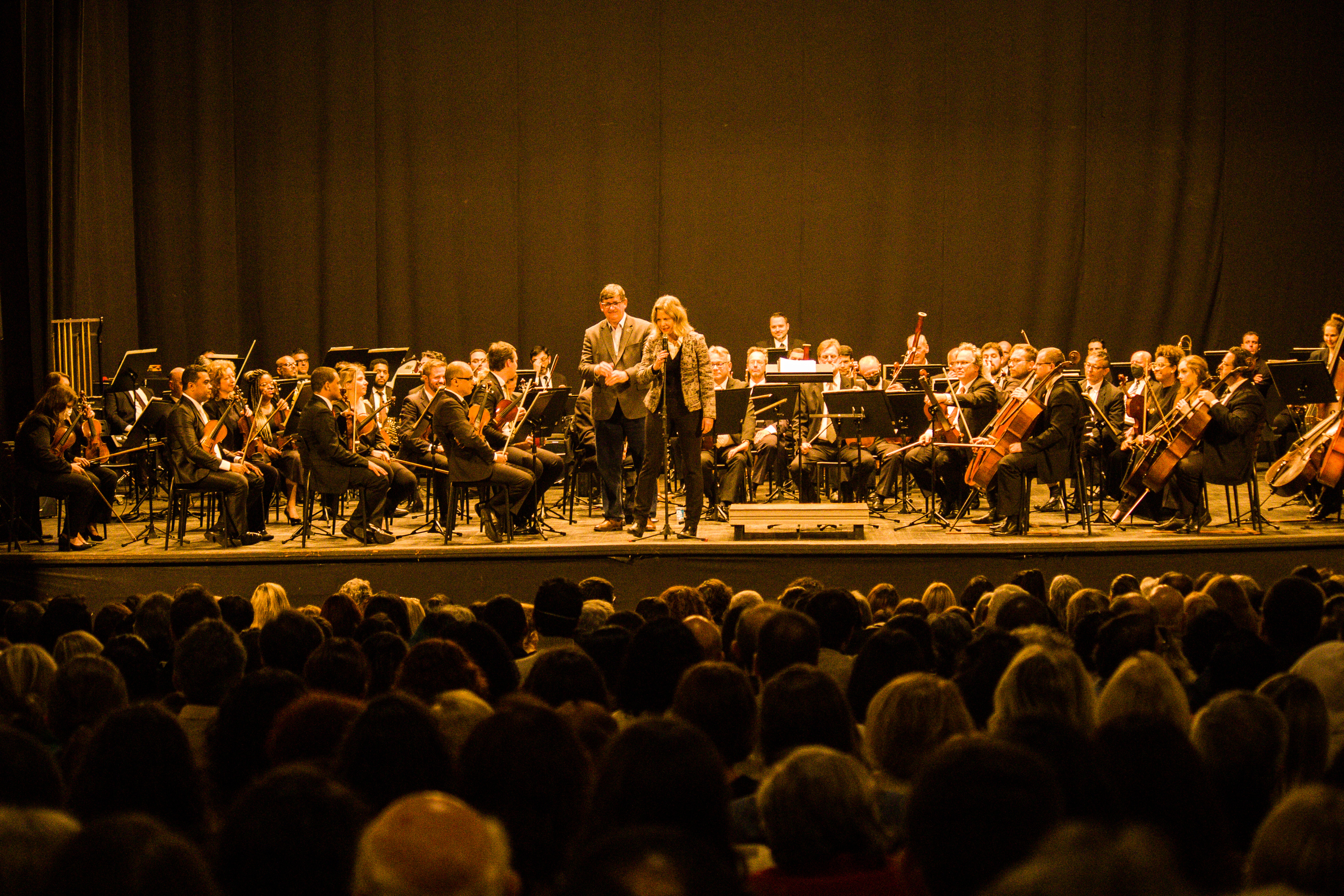
Porto Alegre Symphony Orchestra

The city is a reference for the entire state in terms of classical music, serving as the main hub for production and dissemination of influence. It has a considerable audience for this genre; it is included in the tour routes of internationally renowned performers and boasts two major orchestras - the Porto Alegre Symphony Orchestra (OSPA) and the PUCRS Philharmonic Orchestra - as well as a chamber orchestra, the São Pedro Theater Chamber Orchestra, along with numerous smaller chamber groups and vocal and instrumental soloists. The city also has a large number of music schools and performance venues.

At the same time, there has been development in academic research and advanced professional qualification in the undergraduate and graduate music programs at UFRGS. In addition to generating musicological texts and publications and preparing music professionals and new teachers, the organization of public recitals is an integral part of the functioning of these programs.

=== Cuisine ===
The traditional beverage is chimarrao, a South-American caffeine-rich infused drink. The Chalet of the XV de Novembro Plaza is located along the Glênio Peres Square, it is one of the most traditional bar-draught beer-restaurants in the city, where the last "lambe-lambe" photographs of the region work. "Lambe-lambes" are photographers who develop pictures outdoor using the oldest method known. In the Bavarian style, with art nouveau traits, the centenary Chalet was built up on a demountable steel structure, keeping its original chandeliers and tiles even nowadays.

== Architecture ==
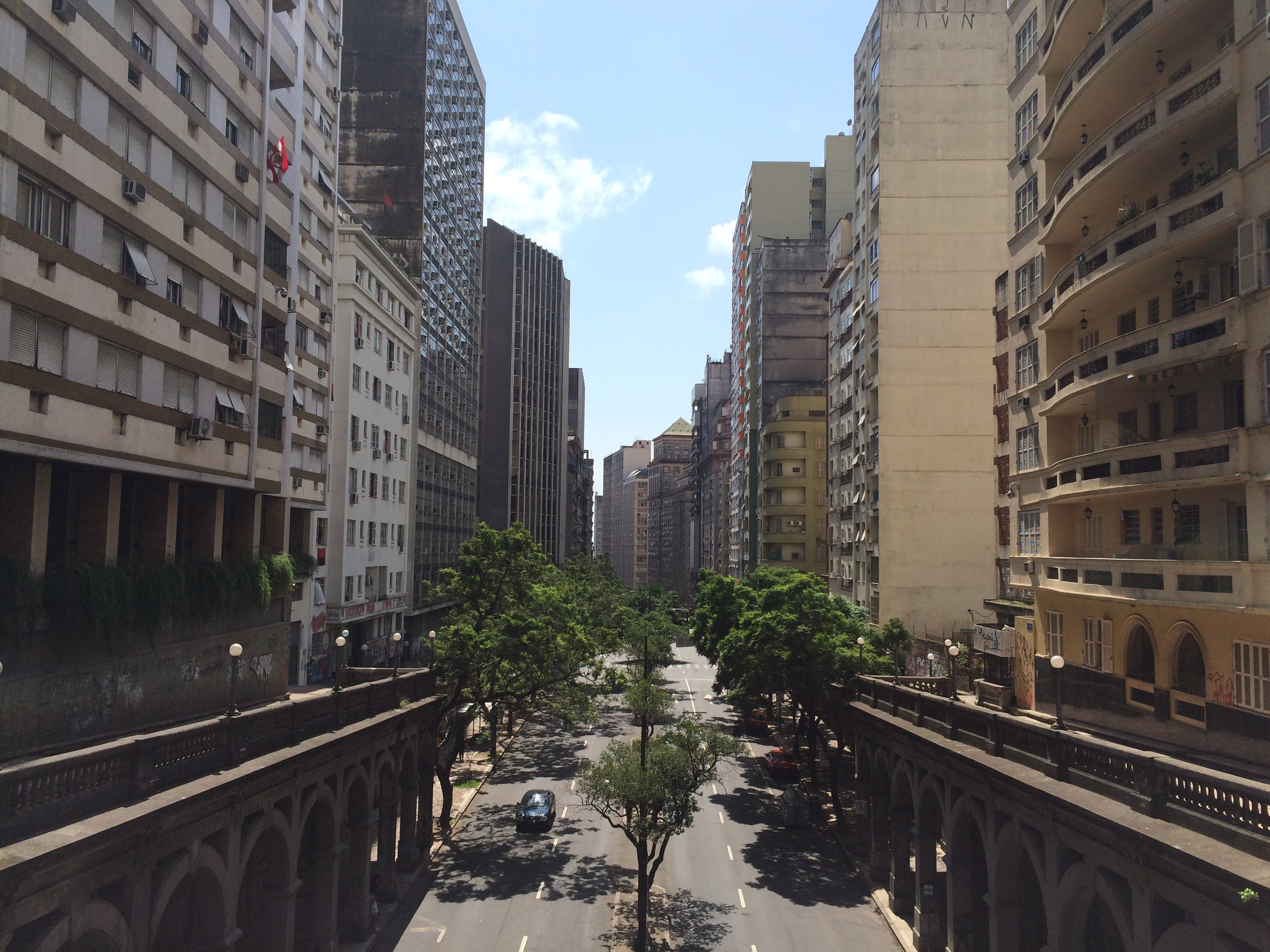
Borges de Medeiros avenue

The architecture of Porto Alegre is a mosaic of ancient and modern styles. This characteristic is most visible in the center of the city, the historic urban center, where examples of eighteenth-century architecture survive amidst nineteenth-century and contemporary buildings.

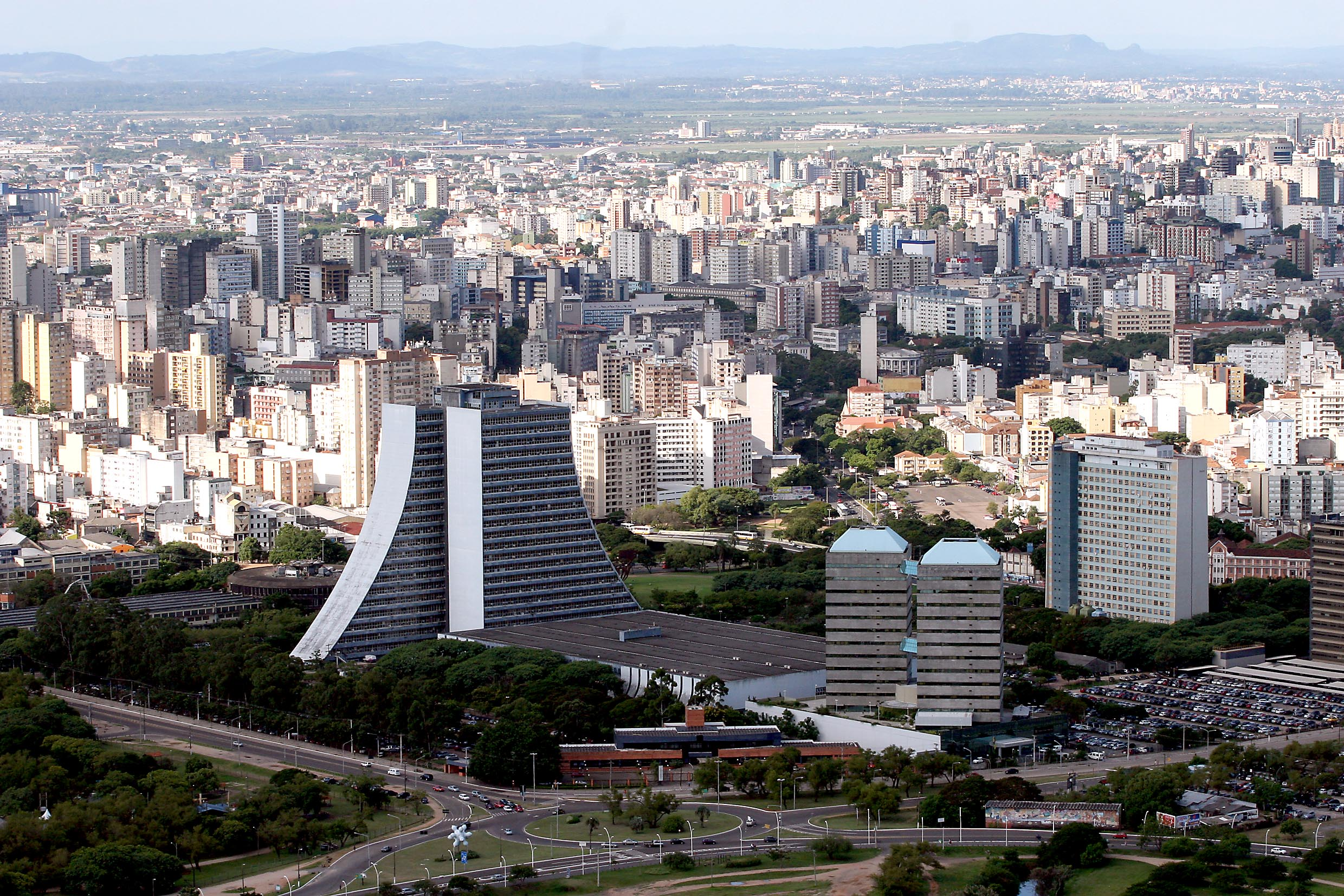
View of Porto Alegre

The architectural evolution of Porto Alegre does not differ in its general mechanism from most large Brazilian cities, although it has some unique elements. Its condition of provincial capital almost from the beginning resulted in a tendency to expand and monumentalize. Today it is the largest city in the state, the seat of a Metropolitan Region, and one of the largest cities in Brazil. Throughout its history, it has collected an extensive series of monumental buildings, many of extraordinary value, and some advanced urban planning projects, but as a whole, this did not result in a coherent plan nor did it reveal a spirit of long-term planning, having grown vastly in a disorganized and poorly controlled way, with urban plans being very much linked to political and economic oscillations.

The architecture in the city began with the Portuguese colonial style, went through the neoclassical, eclectic, and modernist schools. Porto Alegre verticalized, expanded, merged with neighboring cities, and became a metropolis. Now its architecture is being renewed under the influence of postmodernism and globalization, developing a hybrid and internationalizing style. This has given rise to criticism about the de-characterization of its identity and the extensive destruction of irreplaceable historical architecture in the wave of "progress" and real estate speculation.

Today, the city is reorganizing its urban landscape with major infrastructure works, especially roads, and erecting significant examples of contemporary architecture. At the same time, it faces the challenges of growing into one of Brazil's largest capitals, with almost 1.5 million inhabitants. There is still a large population living in slums and without access to basic services, and dissatisfaction is growing with the directions that the public administration has adopted in the areas of urban planning, popular housing, use of special areas, urban mobility, nature preservation, and others. Urban revitalization projects promoted by the state and municipal governments, such as those of the Mauá Pier, the former Industrial District, and a program of concessions of parks and other public spaces to the private sector, have produced intense controversy.

== Events ==
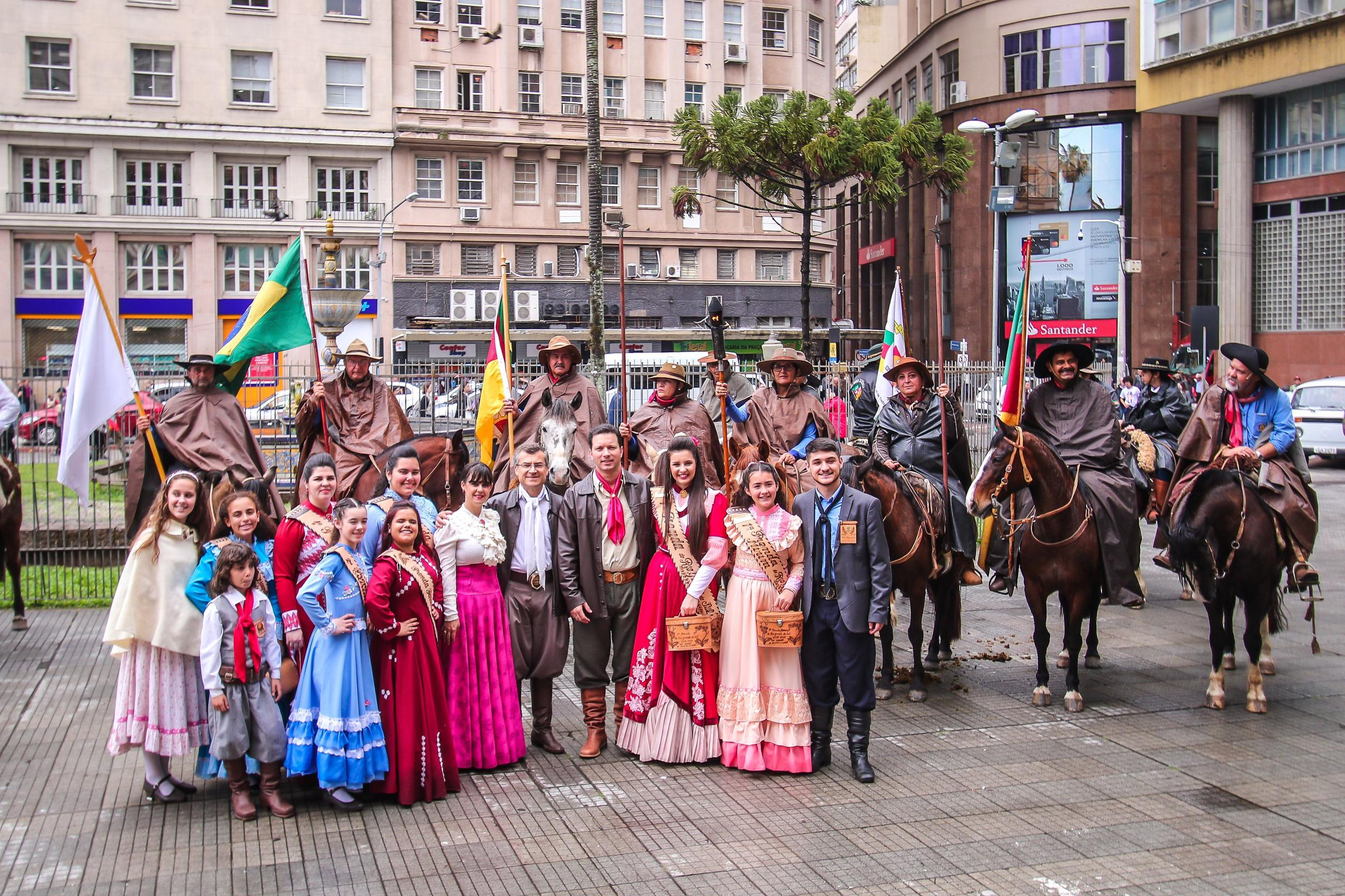
Brazilian gaúcho with typical clothing during the Farroupilha Parade

A wide range of cultural events are held in Porto Alegre. In addition to the traditional celebrations, a wide variety of activities are organized at Porto Alegre during the different seasons.

- World Social Forum: on several occasions (2001, 2002, 2003, 2005) the World Social Forum has been hosted in Porto Alegre. This event gathered more than 100,000 people from more than 100 countries each year. The main aim of these meetings is to discuss and deal with social issues.
- Porto Verão Alegre: during the summer, for example, the "Porto Verão Alegre" or (Porto Summer Alegre) takes place in this city. This celebration consists of a number of performances and exhibitions. In 2005 about seventy plays could be enjoyed.
- International Free Software Forum: the Fórum Internacional de Software Livre (International Free Software Forum or simply FISL) is an event sponsored by Associação Software Livre (Free Software Association), a Brazilian NGO that, among other objectives, seeks the promotion and adoption of free software.
- Farroupilha Week: this cultural celebration takes place in mid September with parades, food and musical exhibitions. The "Acampamento Farroupilha" takes place in Harmonia Park, where thousands of people set up their tents and eat typical food to commemorate the Farroupilha Revolution.
- Bookfair: held each November at Alfândega Square. In October Porto Alegre holds the greatest Book Fair in the Americas, an event that has been taking place since 1955. Each year about 2,000,000 people attend this fair.
- Worldwide Pinhole Photography: this is an international event created to promote and celebrate the art of pinhole photography. The event is held each year on the last Sunday in April.
- Mercosur Biennial Exhibition: is held in Porto Alegre every two years between October and December. This is an important art and cultural event that attracts a large number of people as well.
- Carnival: as do other Brazilian cities, Porto Alegre holds extensive festivities during the period immediately preceding Lent. Among them, there is an Escola de Samba contest, featuring Academia de Samba Puro, Acadêmicos da Orgia, Bambas da Orgia, Estado Maior da Restinga, Fidalgos e Aristocratas, Império da Zona Norte, and Impeadores do Samba, among others.

== Transportation ==
=== International airport ===
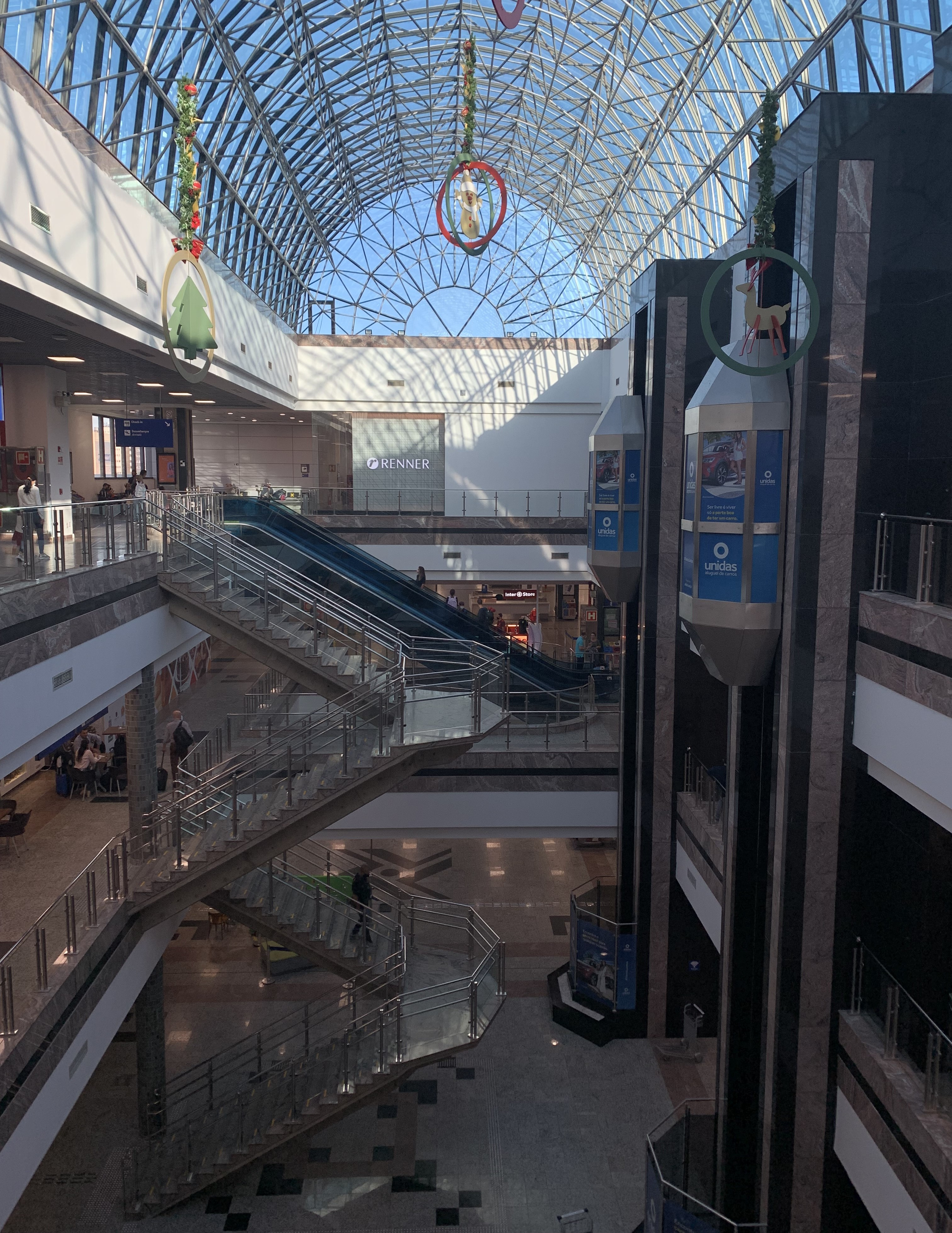
Salgado Filho International Airport

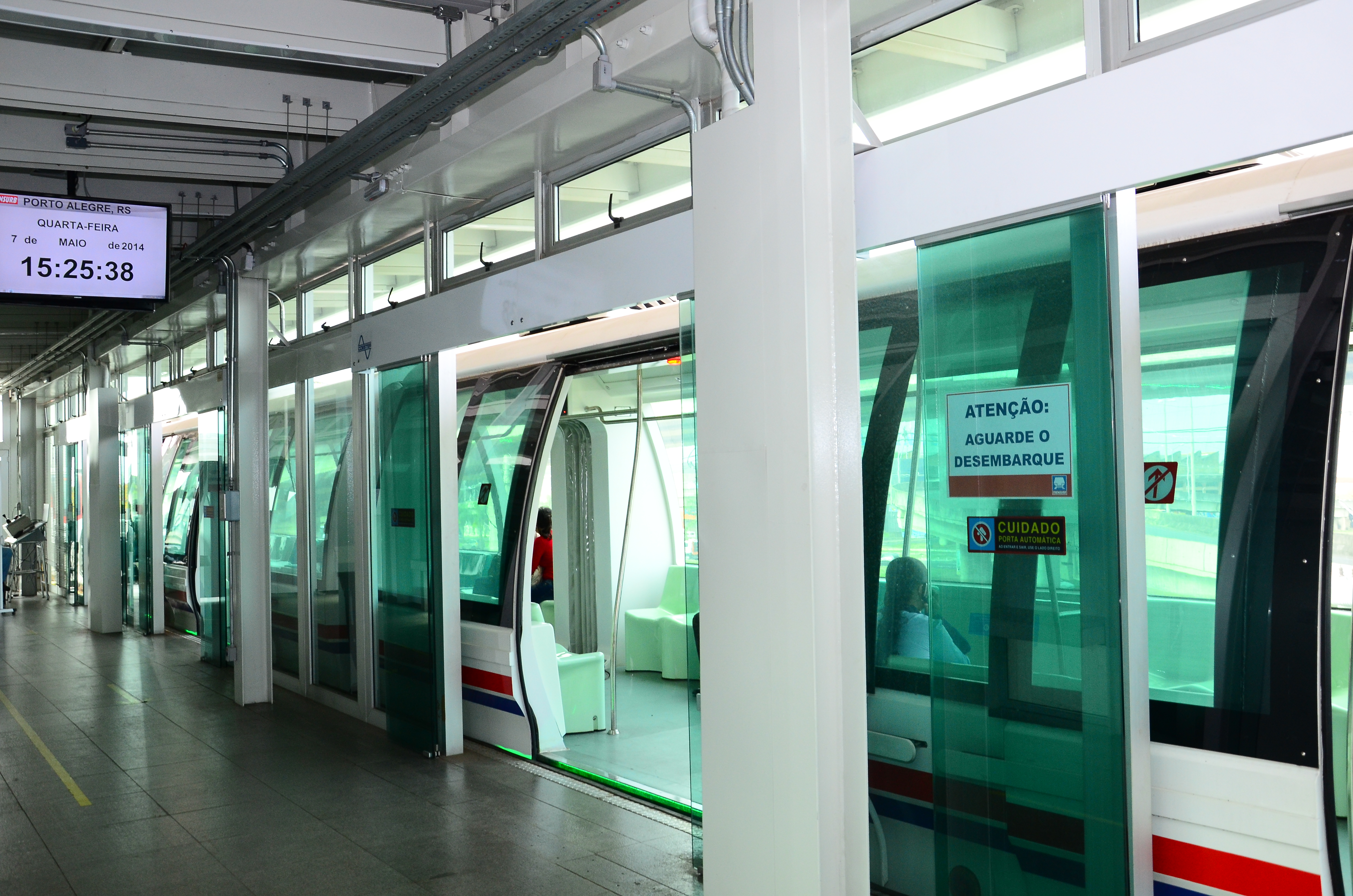
Monorail connecting the airport metro station with the metro system of the city

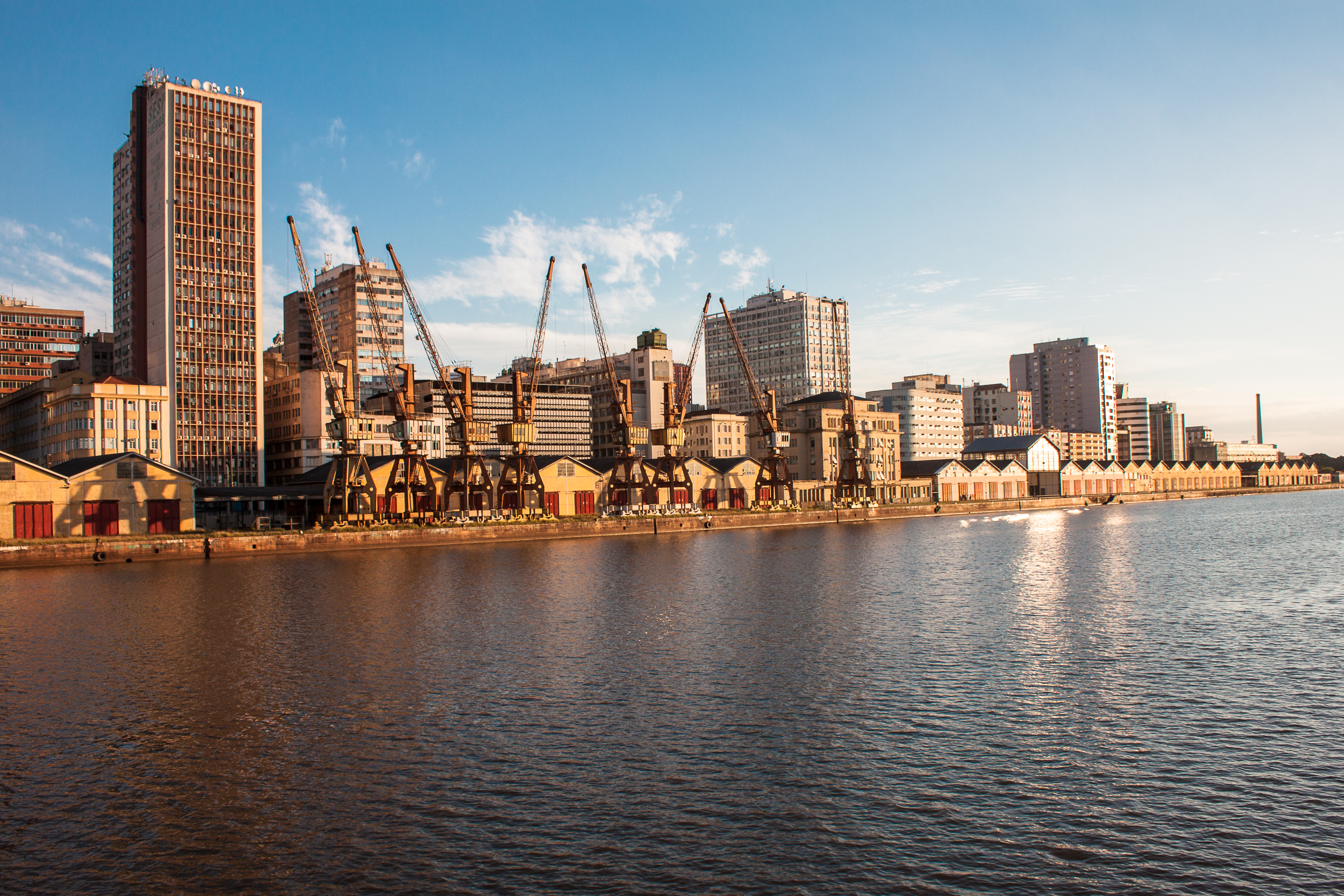
Port of Porto Alegre

Salgado Filho International Airport serves commercial flights to most major cities all over Brazil and to smaller cities in the South of the country. There are also international flights to other South American countries, Panama, and Portugal.

=== Air Force Base ===
Canoas Air Force Base - ALA3, one of their most important bases of the Brazilian Air Force, is located in the nearby city of Canoas.

=== Port ===
The Port of Porto Alegre is situated in the Eastern margin of Guaíba Lake. The port lying on the eastern bank of the Guaíba lake at the point where its waters empty into the huge Lagoa dos Patos is one of Brazil's largest ports. Located near the main access roads to Porto Alegre, it is 4 km (2 mi) away from the Salgado Filho International Airport and has access to the light railway station, through the docks of Mauá and Navegantes. Its geographical position enables a permanent traffic between Porto Alegre and Buenos Aires, transporting steel-industry products and mainly agricultural produce.

=== Metro ===
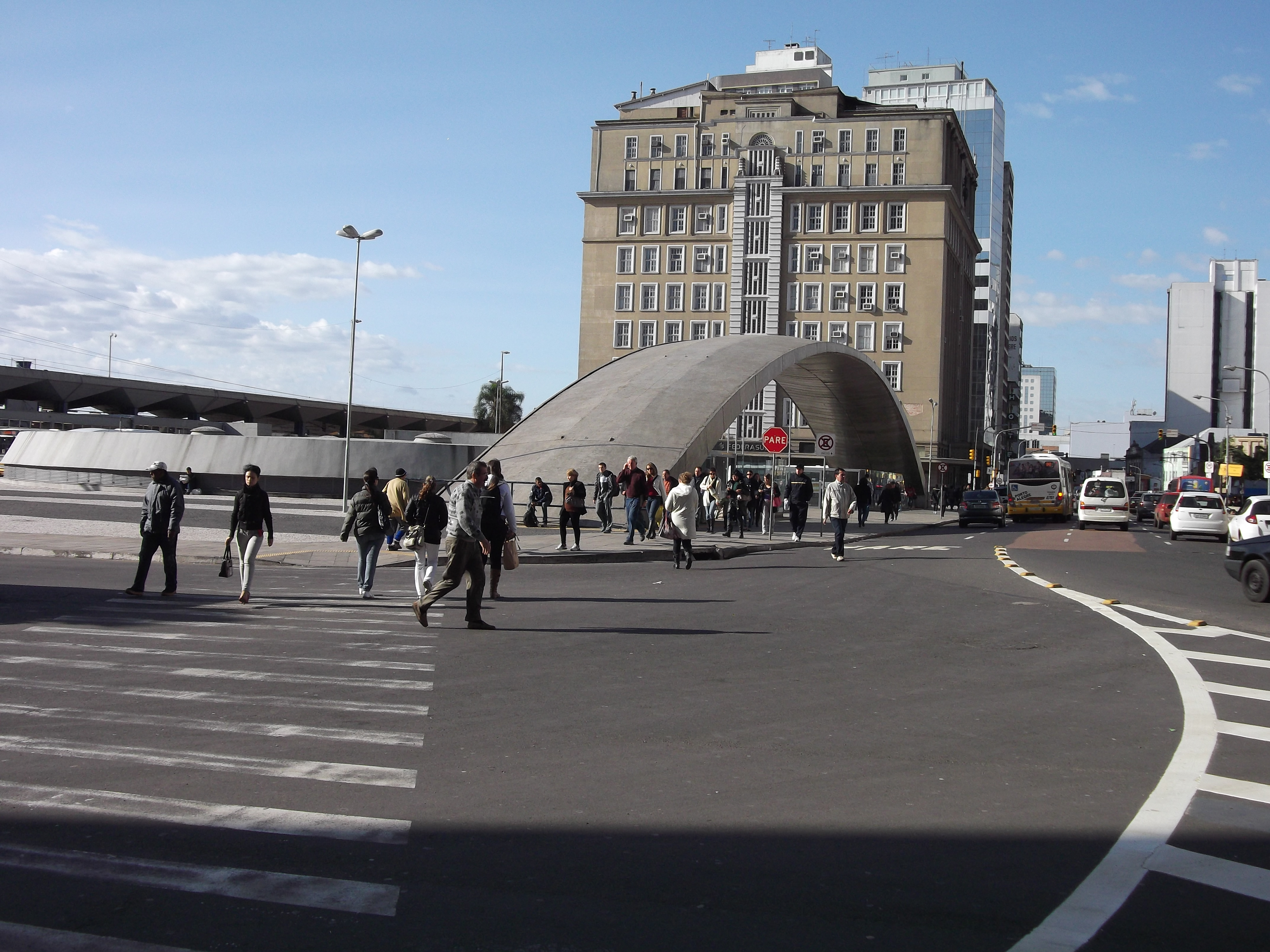
The Mercado station is one of the main subway stations in Porto Alegre and is located in front of the city's public market.

Porto Alegre has a rapid transit system operated by Trensurb, which links downtown Porto Alegre to its northern neighborhoods and to cities to the north of the metropolitan area, as Canoas, Esteio, Sapucaia do Sul, São Leopoldo and Novo Hamburgo. The line has stations at strategic spots, such as: the Public Market, the bus station, the airport and many other important and urban spots throughout Porto Alegre and the other cities the metro covers. The line is built at surface level (30 km, totally segregated) and elevated (12 km).

Trensurb is operated jointly by the federal government, the state government of Rio Grande do Sul and the city of Porto Alegre through the company Trensurb S.A. (Company of Urban Trains of Porto Alegre S.A.) and has 22 working stations, with a total extension of nearly 43 kilometres (27 mi), carrying about 130,000 users a day. Building of the (sole) Line 1 of the metro started in 1980. The choice of path was made to relieve the heavy traffic of highway BR-116, which already presented serious problems with the transit at the time. The line was inaugurated on March 2, 1985, between the Central Public Market and Sapucaia do Sul. In December 1997, it was extended to Unisinos. An extension of 2.4 miles (3.9 km) São Leopoldo–Museum was added in November 2000, after two months of trial service. As of 2013, an extension to Novo Hamburgo is being completed, with the first station already fully functional.

A metro system inside Porto Alegre only is currently planned and it is already subject of much publicity and speculation. However, no project has been approved so far and the beginning of the constructions is yet undefined.

=== Highways ===
There are two federal highways in the city, BR-290 and BR-116, both running close to its northern and northwestern border. The small number is due to the inexistence of many destinations southeast or south of Porto Alegre (considering the landmass east of Lagoa dos Patos), if not for the cities of Pelotas (the third-biggest in population in the State) and Rio Grande (which hosts the State biggest port). Nonetheless, when coming from west, both highways bond in the neighbor municipality of Eldorado do Sul, running mostly jointly within the borders of Porto Alegre, only coming to separate at the very interchange to Canoas. This way, BR-116 has virtually no sole run within Porto Alegre.

BR-290 highway runs east–west across the state, linking the northeast coast of the state to the Uruguay–Argentina–Brazil border. It runs close to the northern border of the municipality. Coming from west, as it reaches the urban area of Porto Alegre, BR-290 highway becomes a high-standard 100 km (62 mi) long freeway that connects to the coast and to the BR-101 highway. The latter is an important way to get to Porto Alegre from the north of the country, by the city Osório. BR-101 connects to Curitiba, Florianópolis and northern Santa Catarina state, and has been recently upgraded to highway standards, with multiple lanes. By entering the BR-290 freeway/BR-101 system, and the other highways it connects to, it is possible to drive from Porto Alegre to as far as Rio de Janeiro or Belo Horizonte almost entirely through 4-lane (or more) highways.

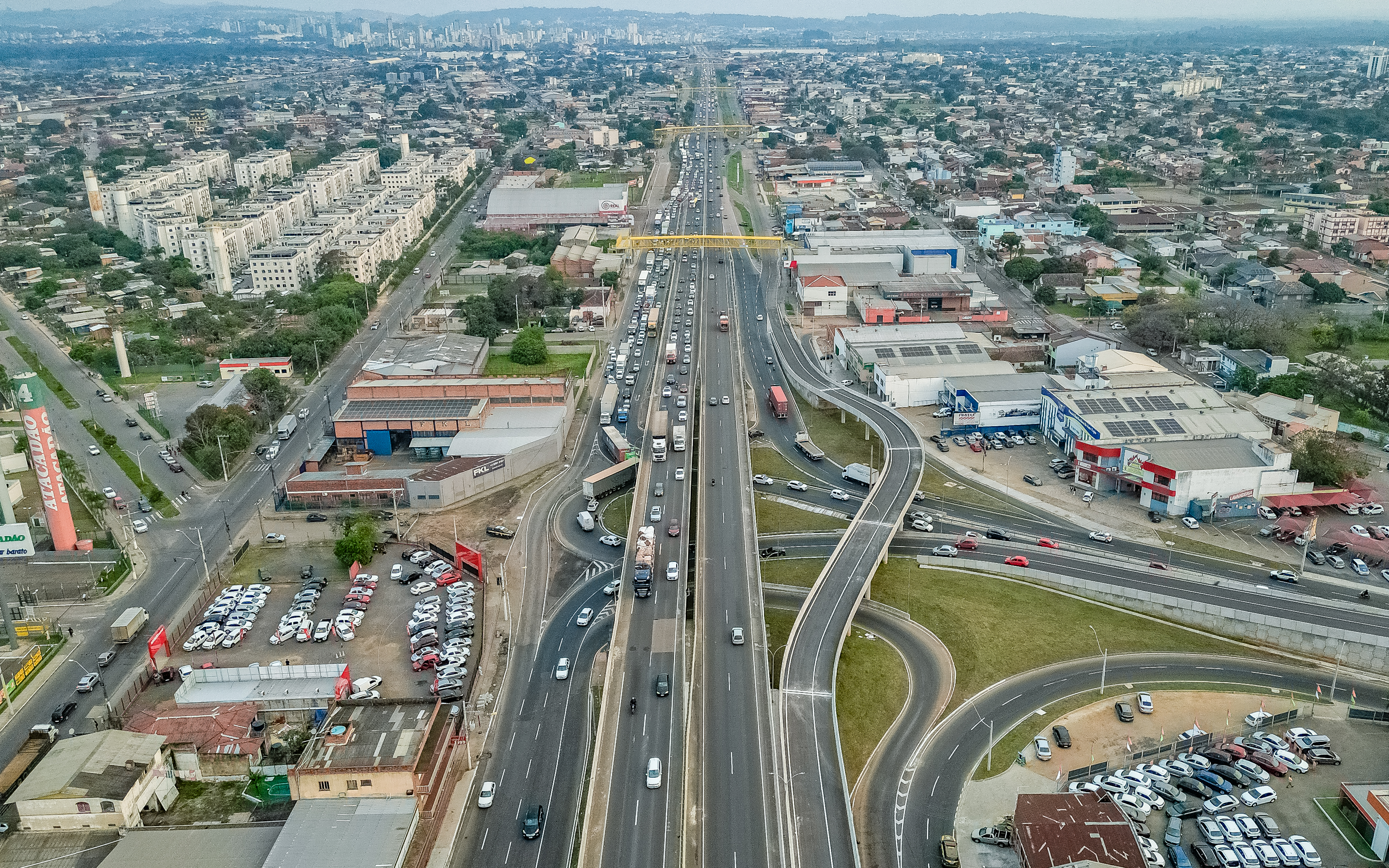
116 Highway in the Great Porto Alegre

The other road, BR-116, is a longitudinal highway, running northeast–south across the state, linking Porto Alegre to several satellite cities and other Brazilian capitals to the north, and Pelotas and Uruguay to the south. Within the municipality, it only touches the northwest side of the city, close to the end of Rio Gravataí (Gravataí River), sharing its entire run with BR-290, only separating when heading north onto Canoas.

A third road, BR-448, is currently under construction. BR-448 is planned to connect the northeast of Porto Alegre to Sapucaia do Sul, as an alternative to BR-116, notably jam-packed on its Canoas-Novo Hamburgo stretch during traffic rush hours.

The connection between downtown Porto Alegre and the highways is made by Avenida Presidente Castelo Branco (President Castelo Branco Avenue), which is a short - 4 kilometres (2.5 mi) - avenue also bordering the northwest side of the city, Avenida dos Estados (States' Avenue), which is the access way to the Salgado Filho International Airport, and Avenida Assis Brasil (Assis Brasil Avenue), the main Avenue in the northern Porto Alegre.

=== Bus ===
The city has a functioning transportation system, especially the buses. Porto Alegre has also mini-buses from and to all the main neighborhoods in the city, with sitting-only transport and the possibility to hop on and off at any point but also higher fares. Linha Turística (Tourist Line) is a bus that leaves from Usina do Gasômetro tourist terminal around six times per day. During 90 minutes, it traverses the various districts of Porto Alegre, for a modest price. Exclusive bus lanes in the median of seven radial corridors that converge on the city center are used by both urban and regional lines. The bus fleet totals 1,600, with 150 minibuses. About 325 million people use the system annually.

Those lines have no prefix. It is quite common to switch buses at downtown but since there is a myriad of lines there, it can be challenging to find the right terminal for the next bus. Transversal lines prefix "T" (T1, T2, ..., T11), connect different neighborhoods without going through the downtown area, which effectively eliminates the need of changing buses for the most common trips. Circular lines prefix "C" (C1, C2, C3), as the name indicates, run in a circular manner, usually connecting parts of the downtown area to the nearest neighborhoods. Mayor José Fogaça renewed his agreement with EMBARQ and the Center for Sustainable Transport Brazil (CTS-Brasil) to improve accessibility and mobility in downtown Porto Alegre. The agreement, signed on March 11, includes a new partnership with the Andean Development Corporation, a Latin American multilateral financial institution that is expected to provide $1 million in non-reimbursable technical assistance to help Porto Alegre complete the preparation phase of the "Portais da Cidade" bus rapid transit project, a groundbreaking transport system designed to reduce pollution and congestion downtown. The system will include a southern extension to accommodate activities for the 2014 FIFA World Cup. CAF's technical assistance will be administered through CTS-Brasil, which has been working to expand sustainable transport in Porto Alegre since 2005.

The bus station downtown and is served by several national and international lines. It is also connected to a Trensurb station (Porto Alegre Metro) and several municipal bus lines. Northbound passengers can rely on good bus connections throughout Brazil. However, an express bus might be recommended to travel to Uruguay or Argentina to avoid several stops en route.

=== Taxi ===
Porto Alegre has a total of 3,922 authorized taxicabs, with 317 taxi stops. Regular taxis are colored red, whereas airport taxicabs are colored white, both with blue strips on the sides containing white lettering.

== Sports ==
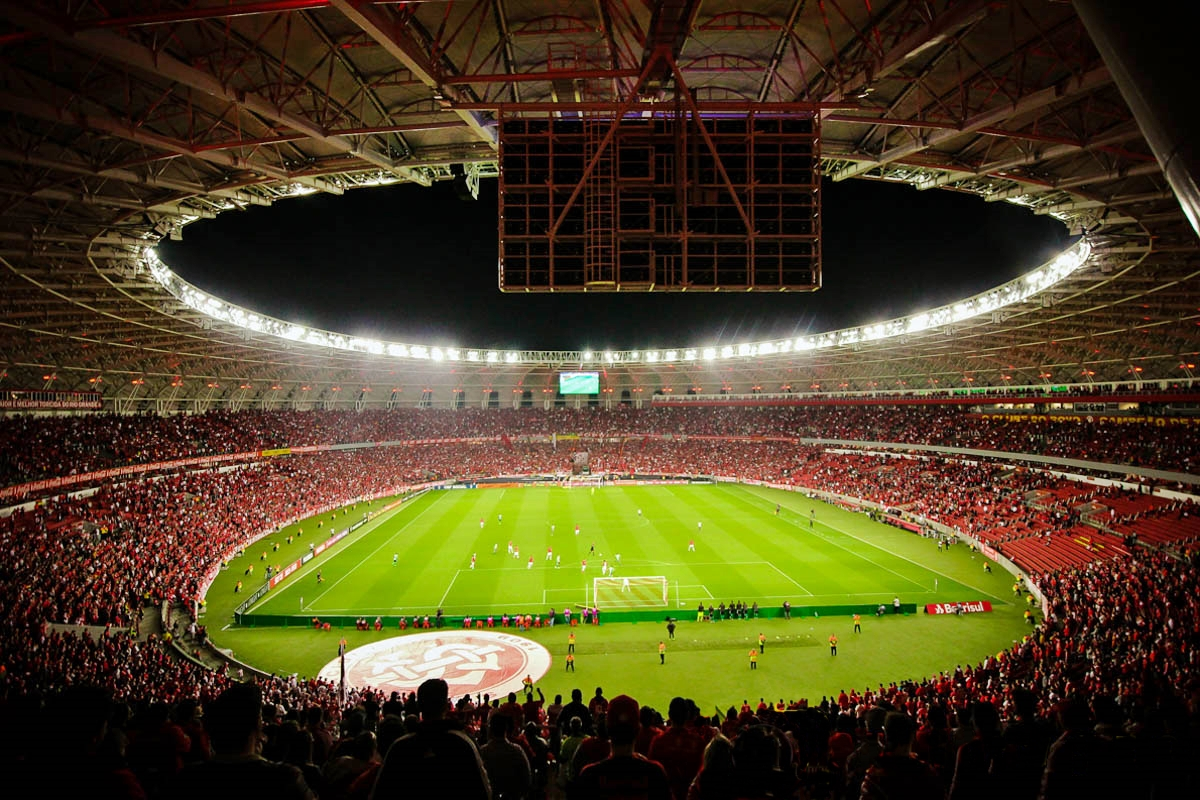
Estádio Beira-Rio, home of Sport Club Internacional

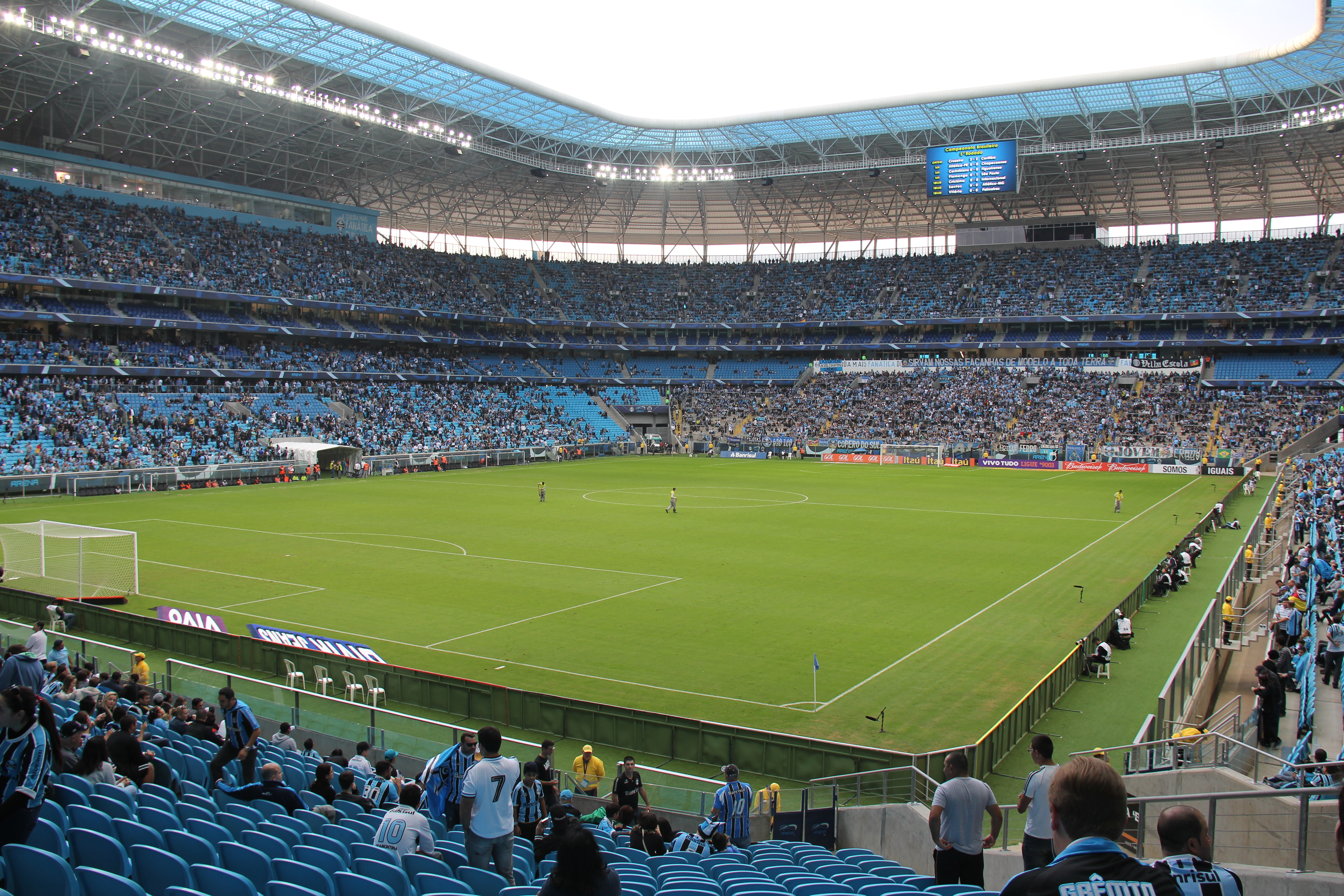
Arena do Grêmio, home of Grêmio Foot-Ball Porto Alegrense

Football is a passion of the people from Porto Alegre. There is a big rivalry between two football clubs, Grêmio Foot-Ball Porto Alegrense, founded in 1903, and Sport Club Internacional, founded in 1909. Grêmio Foot-Ball Porto Alegrense and Sport Club Internacional currently play in the top league in Brazil, the Campeonato Brasileiro Série A. Both have successful histories, having won national and international titles, including the South American top honour, the Copa Libertadores, and the highest global trophy for football clubs, the Intercontinental Cup, now known as the Club World Cup. The rivalry between the teams is known as the Grenal and is considered one of the fiercest in Brazil, South America and the World. Other traditional teams includes Série C side Esporte Clube São José, which plays in the Estádio Passo D'Areia on the northern zone of the city, and Esporte Clube Cruzeiro, which from its founding in 1913 until 2019 played in Porto Alegre until they relocated to Cachoeirinha —in the metropolitan region of Porto Alegre—after inaugurating a brand new stadium there.

Porto Alegre was one of the host cities of the 2014 FIFA World Cup held in Brazil. The modernization of the Beira-Rio Stadium, home of SC Internacional and the city's 2014 FIFA World Cup venue, left the venue with a capacity for 56,000 spectators. Internacional's former home, the Estádio dos Eucaliptos, was a venue for the 1950 FIFA World Cup. Local rivals Grêmio play in their own stadium in the Humaitá district. The Arena do Grêmio stadium replaced the Estádio Olímpico Monumental in 2012 and meets CONMEBOL/FIFA standards. The Arena do Grêmio stadium has a capacity for 60,540 spectators.

American football is also played in the city, with two teams: Porto Alegre Pumpkins, the oldest in the state, and Porto Alegre Bulls, who play with the Esporte Clube São José, a club with multiple sports.

On January 22, 2015, Porto Alegre hosted its first Ultimate Fighting Championship event at the Gigantinho. UFC Fight Night: Bigfoot vs. Mir was headlined by former heavyweight champion Frank Mir making his Brazilian debut, knocking out Brasilia native Antônio Silva. Former UFC Heavyweight Champion Fabrício Werdum is a Porto Alegre native.

== Neighborhoods ==
Neighborhoods of Porto Alegre are geographical divisions of the city. There is no devolution of administrative powers to neighborhoods, although there are several neighborhoods associations devoted to improve their own standards of living. Porto Alegre has nowadays 81 official distinguished neighborhoods.

== Consular representations ==
The following countries have consular representations in Porto Alegre:

- Argentina (Consulate)
- Chile (Consulate-General)
- Germany (Consulate-General)
- Italy (Consulate-General)
- Japan (Consular Office)
- Portugal (Vice-Consulate)
- Spain (Consulate-General)
- United States (Consulate-General)
- Uruguay (Consulate-General)
- Serbia (Honorary Consulate)
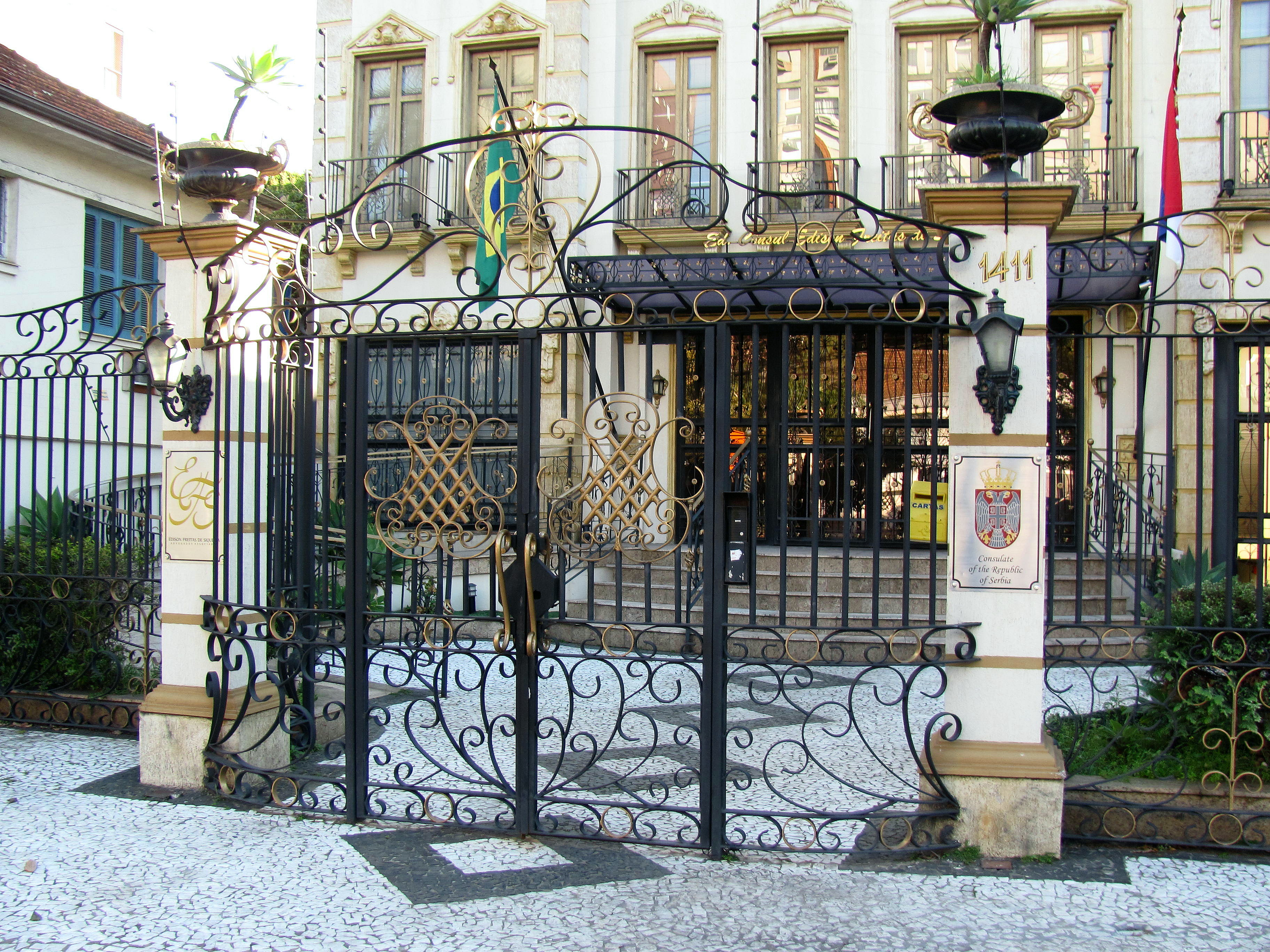
Honorary Consulate of Serbia

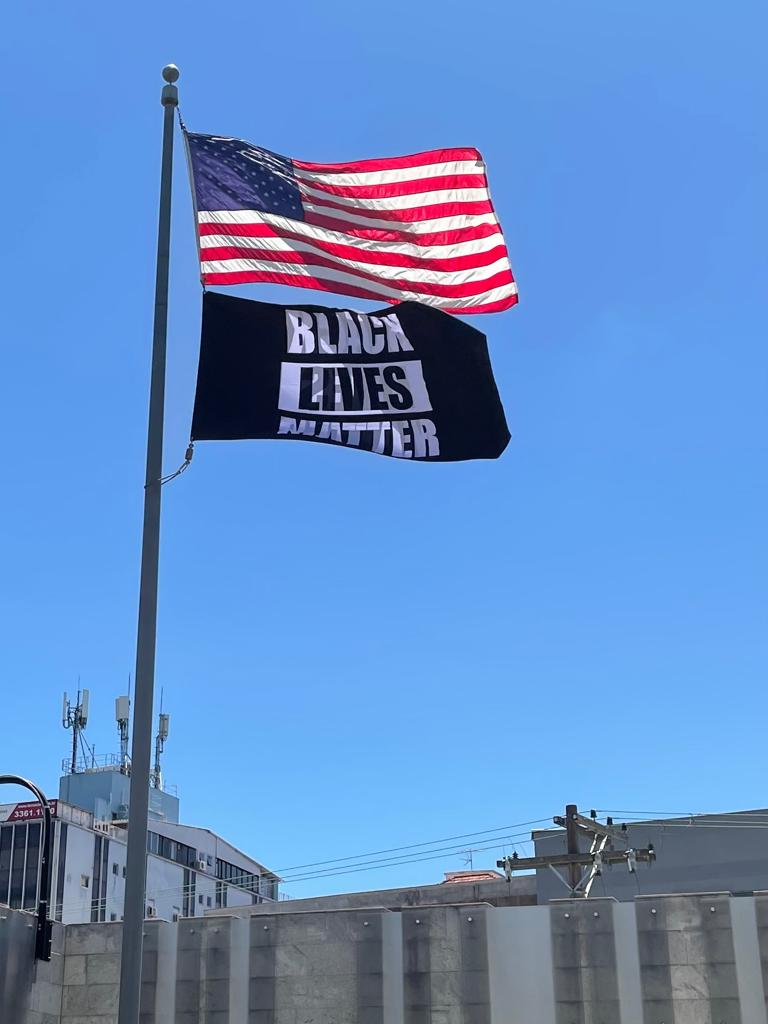
Consulate-General of the United States

== International relations ==
=== Twin towns – sister cities ===
Porto Alegre is twinned with:

- Horta, Portugal (1982)
- Kanazawa, Japan (1967)
- La Plata, Argentina (1982)
- Morano Calabro, Italy (1982)
- Natal, Brazil (1992)
- Newark, United States (2006)
- Punta del Este, Uruguay (1984)
- Portalegre, Portugal (1982)
- Ribeira Grande, Portugal (1982)
- Rosario, Argentina (1994)
- Suzhou, China (2004)

=== Partner cities ===
Porto Alegre also has the following partner city:

- Paris, France (2001)

== See also ==
- List of Hills of Porto Alegre
- History of Rio Grande do Sul
- Otávio Rocha Viaduct
- Companhia Carris Porto-Alegrense
