= Greater Porto Alegre =

Human settlement in Brazil

Coordinates: 30.0328°S 51.2300°W

Greater Porto Alegre. grande Porto Alegre, legally defined "core" metropolitan area

Greater Porto Alegre or the metropolitan area of Porto Alegre is the 5th most populous metro area in Brazil, with an estimated population of 4.3 million inhabitants encompassing 34 municipalities around Porto Alegre, the capital of the state of Rio Grande do Sul.

Currently, it comprises 10 234,012 km^{2} with a total population of 4,293,050 inhabitants, according to IBGE data of 2017. Only the metropolitan areas of São Paulo, Rio de Janeiro, Belo Horizonte, and Brasília, respectively, are larger than Porto Alegre. Porto Alegre has the 4th largest GDP in the country, estimated at 92 billion dollars.

Greater Porto Alegre is a strategic area for the development of the state, the Southern Cone, and the Mercosur, with an economy based on manufacturing, chemicals, automotive, food, education, steel production, semiconductors, and services, to name a few. It possesses an enormous industrial potential and is home to some of the largest companies in Brazil, and also of many multinationals.

The region is also home to several technology parks and universities, with the federal university UFRGS being recognized by the Ministry of Education (MEC) as the best in Brazil for three years in a row.

== Municipalities ==
Town / City	Joined on	Bill	Area (km^{2})	Population (2010)	Population (2018)	GDP (in thousands) R$ (2013)
Alvorada	June 8, 1973	LCF 14/1973	70,811	195,718	209,213	1,992,342
Araricá	July 30, 1998	LCE 11201	35,292	4,868	5,622	122,598
Arroio dos Ratos	January 1, 2000	LCE 11539	425,938	13,608	14,123	174,142
Cachoeirinha	June 8, 1973	LCF 14/1973	43,766	118,294	129,307	5,648,490
Campo Bom	June 8, 1973	LCF 14/1973	61,406	60,081	66,156	2,168,912
Canoas	June 8, 1973	LCF 14/1973	131,097	324,025	344,957	11,451,934
Capela de Santana	June 28, 2001	LCE 11645	184,003	11,613	11,810	152,665
Charqueadas	July 27, 1994	LCE 10234	216,513	35,363	40,301	1,006,974
Dois Irmãos	October 3, 1989	CE	65,156	27,572	32,205	1,323,496
Eldorado do Sul	October 3, 1989	CE	509,699	34,335	40,643	959,833
Esteio	June 8, 1973	LCF 14/1973	27,543	80,669	83,121	2,780,621
Estância Velha	June 8, 1973	LCF 14/1973	52,378	42,589	49,345	1,149,281
Glorinha	October 3, 1989	CE	323,641	6,885	7,988	358,176
Gravataí	June 8, 1973	LCF 14/1973	463,758	255,762	279,398	10,197,232
Guaíba	June 8, 1973	LCF 14/1973	376,973	95,230	98,043	4,174,309
Igrejinha	December 22, 2011	LCE 13853	136,816	31,663	36,450	1,326,577
Ivoti	October 3, 1989	CE	63,138	19,877	23,880	714,430
Montenegro	January 14, 1999	LCE 11307	420,017	59,436	64,788	2,624,259
Nova Hartz	October 3, 1989	CE	62,558	18,346	21,317	649,953
Nova Santa Rita	July 30, 1998	LCE 11201	217,868	22,706	28,670	914,883
Novo Hamburgo	June 8, 1973	LCF 14/1973	223,606	239,051	246,452	7,021,001
Parobé	October 3, 1989	CE	109,026	51,481	57,660	958,182
Porto Alegre	June 8, 1973	LCF 14/1973	496,827	1,409,939	1,479,101	57,379,337
Portão	October 3, 1989	CE	159,942	30,881	36,510	971,739
Rolante	August 5, 2010	LCE 13496	296,992	19,493	21,199	420,492
Santo Antônio da Patrulha	September 21, 2000	LCE 11530	1,048,904	39,679	42,648	886,392
Sapiranga	June 8, 1973	LCF 14/1973	137,519	75,020	81,198	2,125,761
Sapucaia do Sul	June 8, 1973	LCF 14/1973	58,644	130,988	140,311	2,630,605
São Jerônimo	June 21, 1999	LCE 11340	937,049	22,141	24,078	413,216
São Leopoldo	June 8, 1973	LCF 14/1973	102,313	214,210	234,947	5,854,218
São Sebastião do Caí	June 13, 2012	LCE 14047	111,435	21,932	25,467	526,820
Taquara	March 21, 1999	LCE 11318	457,130	54,656	57,292	999,225
Triunfo	October 3, 1989	CE	823,416	25,811	29,207	5,900,492
Viamão	June 8, 1973	LCF 14/1973	1,494,263	239,234	254,101	2,680,846
Total			10,345,447	3,958,985	4,317,508	138,659,433

== Education ==
The region is home to a few research institutions, such as the federal university UFRGS, UFCSPA, PUCRS and Unisinos, several other smaller universities and colleges. All three major universities have their own technology park, hosting multinational companies such as SAP AG, Hewlett-Packard, and Oracle, as well as several start-ups.

There are also technical high-schools in the region, providing early technical education and workforce for local companies.

== Culture ==
=== Events ===
The main event in the region is the state fair, called Expointer.

== Transportation ==
=== Airports ===
The main airport serving the region is the Salgado Filho International Airport, which underwent major expansions in recent years, expanding its passager terminals and parking facilities. The main runway is currently being expanded, allowing longer flights in the future.

The airport is linked to the region's subway system, Trensurb, by the Aeromovel, a compressed air moved light rail.

The airport is operated by the German company Fraport AG.

Because Salgado Filho Airport cannot expand beyond its only runway, a new airport was proposed in the city of Portao and Nova Santa Rita that would house up to four runways. The new airport is named 20 de Setembro Airport after the symbolic state independence from Brazil in the Farrapos War.

=== Rail ===
The Greater Porto Alegre is served by Trensurb, a heavy-rail system linking downtown Porto Alegre to downtown Novo Hamburgo passing through Canoas, Esteio, Sapucaia, and São Leopoldo. There are plans to expand the line to the city of Portao and to the southern neighborhoods of Porto Alegre. The line comprises a mix of elevated and surface-level rail.

A second line of heavy-rail is planned to run from Cachoeirinha to downtown Porto Alegre and up to Viamao, but recent economic downturns have halted the project. This line will include an underground and elevated rail.

Several projects of light-rail are planned or under construction in the area, linking the main subway line to the neighborhoods in Canoas and Porto Alegre.

=== Highways ===
The major highways that cross the region are BR-290 (Freeway), BR-116, BR-290, BR-386, BR-448, RS-040, and RS-118.

=== Ports ===
The major port is Porto Alegre, but several companies have private terminals along the regions' rivers.

The region also has ferry lines, linking Porto Alegre to Guaiba and between neighborhoods in the capital.

== Sports ==
=== Football ===
With soccer being the most popular in Brazil and in the region, the two main sports clubs are Gremio Foot-Ball Porto Alegrense, or just Gremio, and Sport Club Internacional, or International. Both teams have won all major domestic and international competitions, such as the World-Cup Club, Libertdores Cup, Brasileirao, and Brasil Cup.
