= Subtropical Storm Yakecan =

South Atlantic subtropical storm in 2022

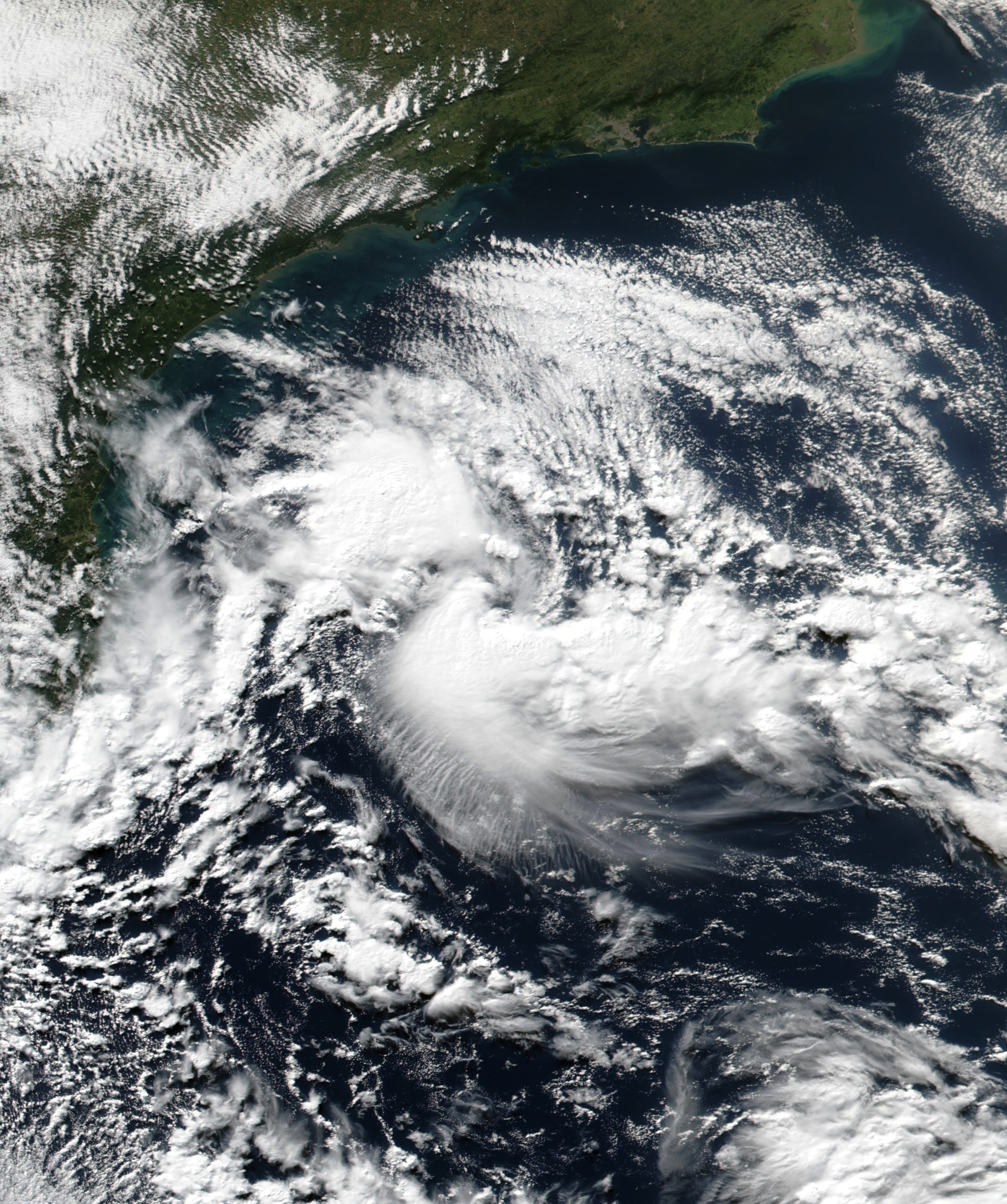
- Subtropical Storm Yakecan at peak intensity off the coast of Santa Catarina on 18 May

Meteorological history
- Formed: 16 May 2022
- Dissipated: 19 May 2022

Subtropical storm
- 1-minute sustained (SSHWS)
- Highest winds: 95 km/h (60 mph)
- Lowest pressure: 990 hPa (mbar); 29.23 inHg

Overall effects
- Fatalities: 2
- Damage: $50 million (2022 USD)
- Areas affected: Brazil (Paraná, Rio de Janeiro, Rio Grande do Sul, Santa Catarina and São Paulo) and Uruguay
- Part of the South Atlantic tropical cyclones

Subtropical Storm Yakecan was a subtropical cyclone that during its path, passed through the southern region of Brazil, specifically in Rio Grande do Sul and Uruguay. The cyclone came from the sea towards the Rio Grande territory and arrived with less strength in the state of Santa Catarina, where it returned to the sea. It was the sixteenth named storm to hit Brazil since Cyclone Catarina in 2004.

Its severity was confirmed on 16 May 2022 by the National Meteorological Institute (INMET) and the Brazilian Navy, which automatically classified it as an orange alert, meaning a subtropical storm. The orange level is the penultimate level of the scale, and its promotion to the red level was not ruled out. Winds of up to 100 km/h were projected, which led to both regional and federal civil defence not denying the possibility of the cyclone turning into a hurricane as it moved towards land.

Yakecan caused two fatalities in Uruguay and Brazil. The first death in Uruguay happened when strong winds caused a palm tree to fall on the roof of a house. The other case was reported in Porto Alegre, where a fisherman's boat sank in Lake Guaíba. In the state of São Paulo, the wind brought down a hot air balloon on the banks of Rodovia Castello Branco, in the rural area between the towns of Boituva and Porto Feliz, the balloon carried nine people on board who were immediately rescued. One of them was in serious condition. On the 17 May, due to the intensity of the cold air mass that accompanied the cyclone, its humidity caused freezing rain and snowfall in the higher portions of southern Santa Catarina and Paraná.

The name “Yakecan” comes from Tupi-Guarani word meaning "sound from the sky". The cyclone began to lose intensity as it moved northeastward and when it turned eastward away from the coast of São Paulo it dissipated in late 19 May, according to the CHM synoptic chart.

== Meteorological history ==
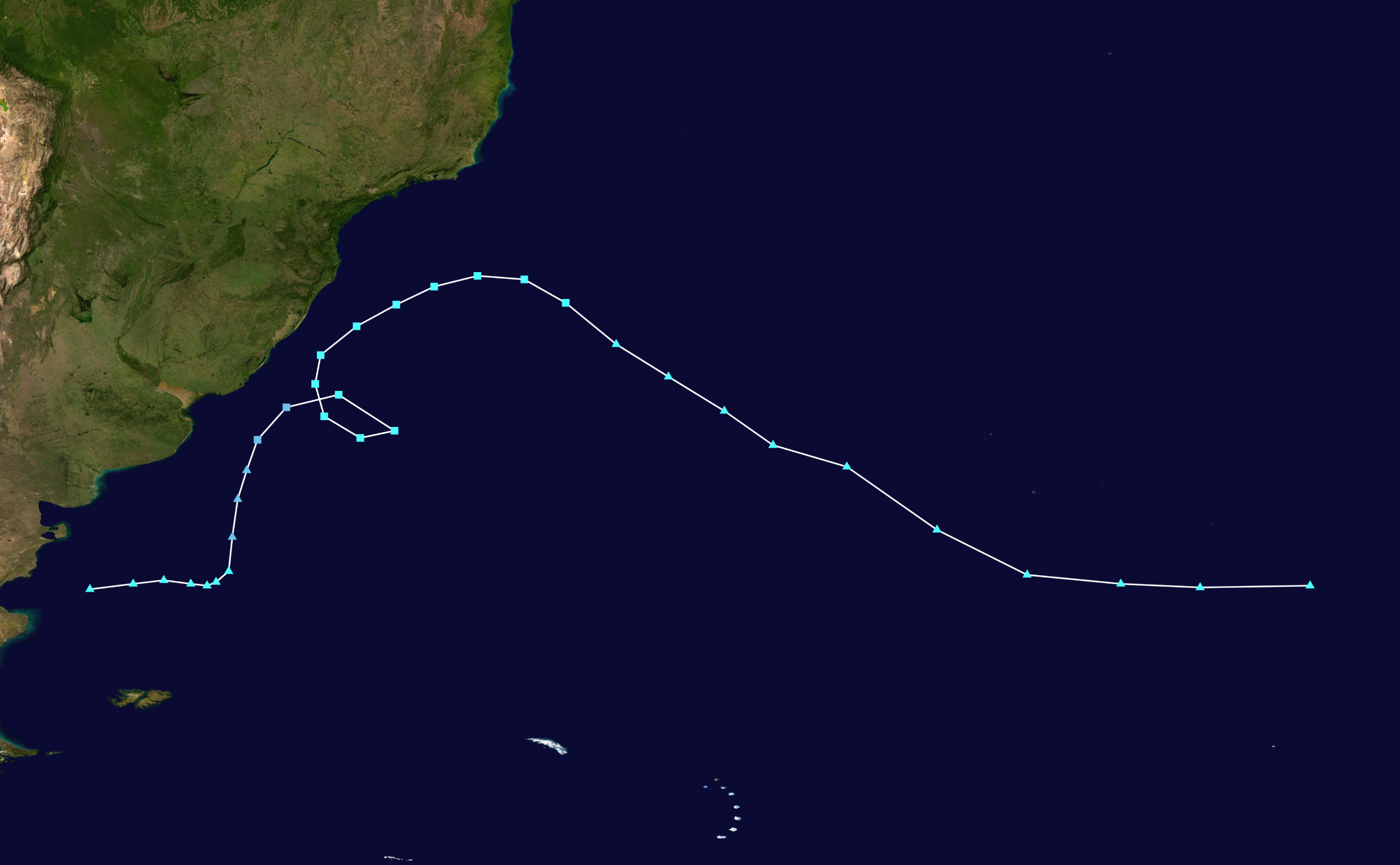
Map plotting the storm's track and intensity, according to the Saffir–Simpson scale Map key Saffir–Simpson scale Tropical depression (≤38 mph, ≤62 km/h) Tropical storm (39–73 mph, 63–118 km/h) Category 1 (74–95 mph, 119–153 km/h) Category 2 (96–110 mph, 154–177 km/h) Category 3 (111–129 mph, 178–208 km/h) Category 4 (130–156 mph, 209–251 km/h) Category 5 (≥157 mph, ≥252 km/h) Unknown Storm type Tropical cyclone Subtropical cyclone Extratropical cyclone, remnant low, tropical disturbance, or monsoon depression

On 15 May 2022, an extratropical cyclone moved through the southern region of Brazil and stopped offshore. The low made a retrograde movement and obtained subtropical characteristics, according to Centro de Hydrografia da Marinha (the CHM). On the morning of 17 May, the cyclone transitioned into a subtropical storm, and was given the name Yakecan. During its trajectory, the storm caused snow in the Gaúcha and Catarinense Mountains, setting record lows for this time of year. The cyclone lost its subtropical characteristics and was downgraded late on 19 May to a low-pressure area.

== Preparations ==
Following confirmation of the formation of the storm on 16 May, preparations began for damage reduction and possible weather strategies.

=== Brazil ===
In addition to the preparations of each state, the national civil defence was watching the storm situation with concern, thus already providing a number for emergency information via mobile phone.

==== Rio Grande do Sul ====
In Rio Grande do Sul, some municipalities cancelled classes in the municipal public education network, highlighting the municipalities of: Porto Alegre, Canoas, Gravataí, Alvorada, Glorinha, Cachoeirinha, Eldorado do Sul, Guaíba, São Jerônimo, São José do Norte, Santa Vitória do Palmar, Chuí, Capão do Leão, Jaguarão, Pedro Osório, Piratini, Pinheiro Machado and Turuçu. Besides major universities in the state have confirmed changes to their timetables due to the storm, among them: Federal University of Rio Grande, Federal University of Health Sciences of Porto Alegre, Unisinos, Federal University of Pelotas, Federal University of Rio Grande do Sul, Centro Universitário Ritter dos Reis, Lutheran University of Brazil, Fundação do Ministério Público (FMP), Instituto Meridiona (IMED), Universidade Feevale and the Pontifical Catholic University of Rio Grande do Sul.

The civil defence together with the water and electricity companies were in a state of readiness to respond to possible calls that have already been programmed due to the strength of the storm. In Porto Alegre, the Municipal Secretariat of Social Assistance was on duty for possible accidents and assistance to homeless people, teams were approaching and referring homeless people to hostels, shelters and hostels. The city hall made available the Tesourinha Gymnasium as a reception base for the homeless population.

==== Santa Catarina ====
In Santa Catarina, the civil defence expected a somewhat weaker storm after hitting the state of Rio Grande do Sul, the main concern was the cold wave that hit the region and could even cause snowfall. Another concern was with the geographical location of Florianópolis, given that it is an island bathed directly by the sea, which could reach waves up to 5 metres (16 ft) high with winds of up to 99 km/h on the coast.

== Impact ==
=== Brazil ===
==== Rio Grande do Sul ====
More than 220,000 people were affected by power cuts in greater Porto Alegre and Campanha Gaúcha because of the cyclone. Several power poles and cables were broken, leaving residents in the dark. On Lake Guaíba, the storm damaged a boat carrying three people, resulting in one of them drowning.

==== Santa Catarina ====
Several municipalities of the coastal strip and mountainous sector of Santa Catarina registered wind damage. On the slopes of the Santa Catarina mountains, the wind was intense enough to cause vehicles to topple over. Due to the intense cold, in the higher areas the cyclone's action caused winter precipitation between 17 and 18 May, in the form of snow and frozen rain; prior to Yakecan, snow had not fallen in the state in 15 years.

==== Paraná ====
In Paraná, the ports of Paranaguá and Antonina operated partially due to the intensity of the winds brought by subtropical cyclone Yakecan. According to the Paraná System of Technology and Environmental Monitoring (Simepar), wind gusts were recorded with an intensity that exceeded 64 km/h (40 mph) on the coast of the state. In Guaratuba, a boat and a bridge that gave access to the floats sank on 18 May.

==== Elsewhere ====
The presence of Yakecan caused a polar air mass to extend over much of southern Brazil on 18 and 19 May, causing several places to observe record-low temperatures. The city of São Paulo recorded a historic low of 6.6 °C (43.9 °F) on 18 May, while the Federal District recorded its lowest ever temperature of 1.8 °C (35.2 °F) on 19 May. In Belo Horizonte, Minas Gerais, the temperature fell to 4.4 °C (39.9 °F), the lowest it had been in 43 years.

=== Uruguay ===
Storm surge caused by the cyclone flooded several streets in the departments of Maldonado, mainly in the city of Punta del Este and Rocha, as well as other locations in Canelones and Lavalleja. Four people had to leave their homes after the house where they were staying collapsed in the gale. Rescue teams were sent out to respond to 204 incidents across the country. In Rocha, first responders were deployed on 20 occasions to clear trees and fallen power lines. In La Paloma, trees and roofs collapsed with the force of the wind blocking several streets in the department. The gusts reached close to 100 km/h (62 mph) and INUMET (Uruguay's National Meteorological Institute) declared an orange alert for the whole country. In the Uruguayan capital Montevideo, a 23-year-old man died after a tree collapsed onto his home.

== See also ==
- Tropical cyclones in 2022
- Tropical cyclones and climate change
- Hurricane Catarina (2004) – a rare hurricane-force tropical cyclone that made landfall in Brazil
- Subtropical Storm Ubá (2021) – caused similar effects in southeastern South America
