= Pasipha paucilineata =

Scientific classification
- Kingdom: Animalia
- Phylum: Platyhelminthes
- Order: Tricladida
- Family: Geoplanidae
- Genus: Pasipha
- Species: P. paucilineata

Binomial name
- Pasipha paucilineata Amaral & Leal-Zanchet, 2018

Species of flatworm

Pasipha paucilineata is a species of land planarian belonging to the subfamily Geoplaninae. It is found within Brazil.

== Description ==
Pasipha paucilineata has an elongated body with parallel margins; it has a rounded anterior tip and a pointed posterior tip. It can reach up to 78 mm in length. The dorsum is a dark brown or black color, with a greyish stripe running down the middle. The ventral side of the body is a pale gray color. The forked, tubular shape of the prostatic vesicle's proximal portion and its lateral displacement distinguish it from other members of Pasipha.

== Etymology ==
The specific epithet is derived from the Latin words paucus and linea, literally meaning "minimal stripe". This is in reference to the median stripe on the species' dorsum, which is often hard for the naked eye to see.

== Distribution ==
P. paucilineata is only known to be found in the municipality of Portão in Rio Grande do Sul, Brazil.
