= Pasipha albicaudata =

Scientific classification
- Kingdom: Animalia
- Phylum: Platyhelminthes
- Order: Tricladida
- Family: Geoplanidae
- Genus: Pasipha
- Species: P. albicaudata

Binomial name
- Pasipha albicaudata Amaral & Leal-Zanchet, 2018

Species of flatworm

Pasipha albicaudata is a species of land planarian belonging to the subfamily Geoplaninae. It is found within Brazil.

== Description ==
Pasipha albicaudata has an elongate body with parallel margins that can reach up to around 70 mm in length. The anterior tip is rounded while the posterior is pointed. The dorsum is a light brown-to-dark brown color, with a pale yellow stripe running down the middle and irregular, darker brown lateral stripes. Sometimes the median stripe is only visible on the posterior if the main dorsum is darker. The ventral side of the body is pale grey or pale yellow with dark margins. The forked and globose proximal portion of the prostatic vesicle and its lateral disposition separates it from other species of Pasipha.

== Etymology ==
The specific epithet is derived from the Latin words albus and caudae, literally meaning "white tail". This is in reference to the pale yellow, almost whitish median stripe that is sometimes only visible at the posterior of the species' dorsum.

== Distribution ==
P. albicaudata is known to be found in the state of Rio Grande do Sul, Brazil, having been found in the municipalities of Salvador do Sul and Portão.
