= Rubem Berta, Porto Alegre =

Neighbourhood in Porto Alegre, Brazil

Coordinates: 30°00′43″S 51°05′47″W

Rubem Berta is a neighbourhood (bairro) in the city of Porto Alegre, the state capital of Rio Grande do Sul, in Brazil. It was created by Law 3159 from July 9, 1968.

The neighbourhood was named after Ruben Berta, considered the first Varig employee and one of its former presidents.

A lower class area, Rubem Berta is next to the municipality of Alvorada.
