= Pasipha variistriata =

Scientific classification
- Kingdom: Animalia
- Phylum: Platyhelminthes
- Order: Tricladida
- Family: Geoplanidae
- Genus: Pasipha
- Species: P. variistriata

Binomial name
- Pasipha variistriata Amaral & Leal-Zanchet, 2018

Species of flatworm

Pasipha variistriata is a species of land planarian belonging to the subfamily Geoplaninae. It is found within Brazil.

== Description ==
Pasipha variistriata has an elongated body with parallel margins; it has a rounded anterior tip and a pointed posterior tip. It can reach up to 85 mm in length. The dorsum can range from dark brown to light brown in color. In the anterior third and posterior tip of the body, a pale yellow median stripe can be seen. In some cases, this stripe is bordered by dark pigment, and some members of the species may have two black lateral stripes. The ventral side of the body is gray with dark margins.

== Etymology ==
The specific epithet is derived from the Latin words varius and striata, literally meaning "variable" and "striped", respectively. This is in reference to the varying stripes of the species on certain specimens.

== Distribution ==
P. variistriata is only known to be found in the municipality of General Carneiro in Paraná, Brazil.
