= Subtropical Storm Ubá =

South Atlantic subtropical storm in 2021

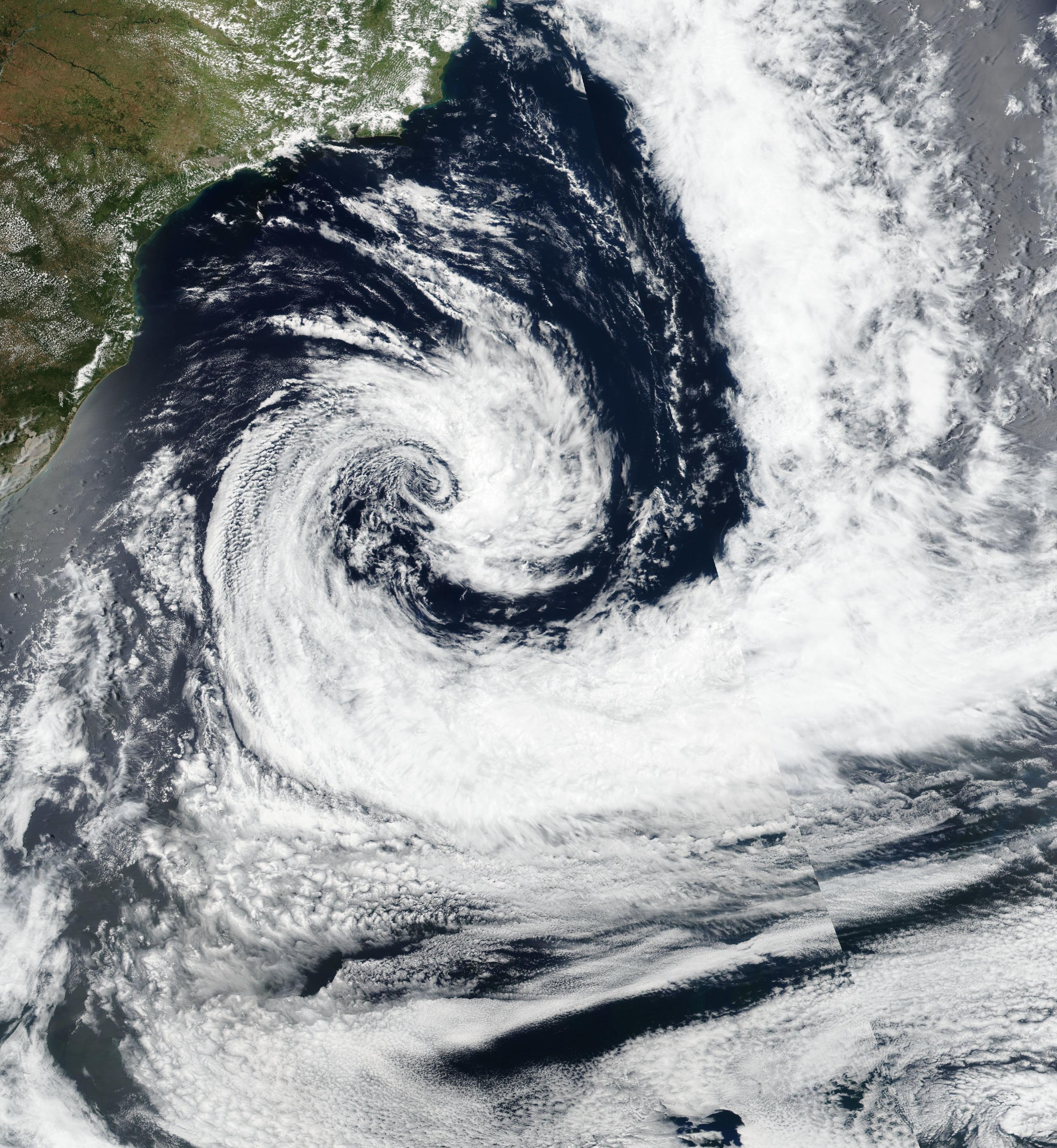
- Subtropical Storm Ubá off the coast of southern Brazil on 10 December

Meteorological history
- Formed: 10 December 2021
- Dissipated: 13 December 2021

Subtropical storm
- 1-minute sustained (SSHWS)
- Highest winds: 65 km/h (40 mph)
- Lowest pressure: 997 hPa (mbar); 29.44 inHg

Overall effects
- Fatalities: 15
- Damage: Unknown
- Areas affected: Argentina, Brazil (Bahia, Espírito Santo, Minas Gerais, Paraná, Rio de Janeiro, Rio Grande do Sul, Santa Catarina and São Paulo) and Uruguay
- Part of the South Atlantic tropical cyclones

Subtropical Storm Ubá was the fourth tropical or subtropical cyclone to form in the South Atlantic Ocean in 2021. Ubá originated from an area of low pressure that formed off the coast of Rio de Janeiro and evolved into a subtropical cyclone on 10 December. The cyclone lingered for two days, before weakening back to a low-pressure area and dissipating on 13 December. Together with the South Atlantic Convergence Zone (SACZ), Ubá caused heavy rains in Minas Gerais, in Espírito Santo and mainly in Bahia. The storm became the deadliest South Atlantic (sub)tropical cyclone, with a death toll of 15.

== Meteorological history ==
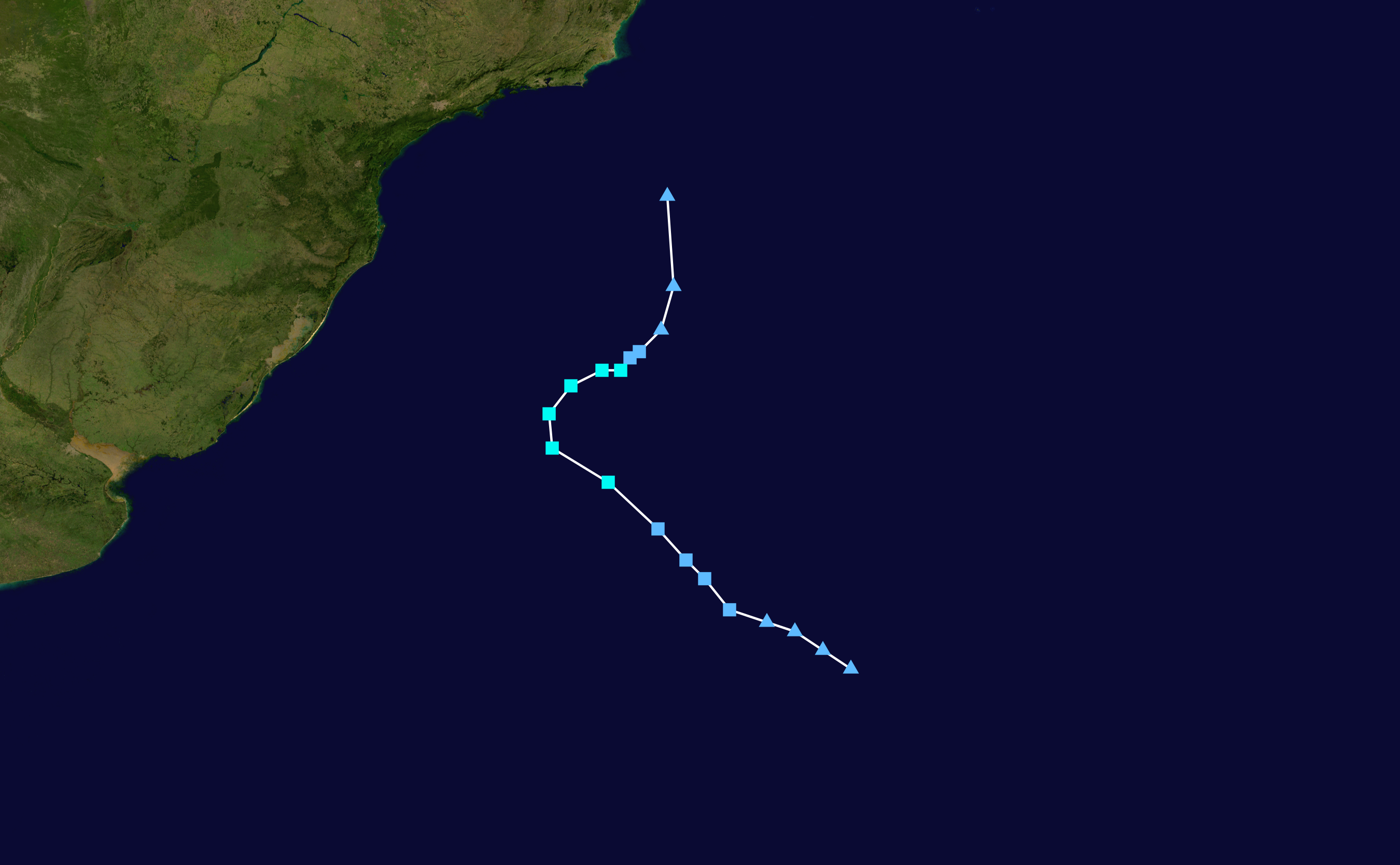
Map plotting the storm's track and intensity, according to the Saffir–Simpson scale Map key Saffir–Simpson scale Tropical depression (≤38 mph, ≤62 km/h) Tropical storm (39–73 mph, 63–118 km/h) Category 1 (74–95 mph, 119–153 km/h) Category 2 (96–110 mph, 154–177 km/h) Category 3 (111–129 mph, 178–208 km/h) Category 4 (130–156 mph, 209–251 km/h) Category 5 (≥157 mph, ≥252 km/h) Unknown Storm type Tropical cyclone Subtropical cyclone Extratropical cyclone, remnant low, tropical disturbance, or monsoon depression

The low-pressure system formed off the coast of Rio de Janeiro and evolved into a subtropical cyclone. The low caused, along with the South Atlantic Convergence Zone, heavy rains in Minas Gerais, in Espírito Santo and mainly in Bahia where very high volumes of precipitation were recorded in the city of Itamaraju, measuring 527 millimeters (20.7 in). More than 30 municipalities in Bahia decreed state of emergency because of heavy rains and ten people died in the state.

On 10 December, the cyclone evolved and gave rise to a subtropical depression on the coast of southern Brazil, according to a synoptic chart from the Brazilian Navy. In the morning of the same day, according to the CHM, the system evolved into a subtropical storm and was named Ubá.

On 12 December, the system was lowered to a subtropical depression upon exiting METAREA V and a day later, encountering cooler waters and of wind shear, it was lowered again to a low pressure common at sea.

== Impact ==
=== Floods in Minas Gerais ===
In the Jequitinhonha Valley, in Minas Gerais, the rain caused by ZCAS and this subtropical cyclone caused flooding, with the Jucuruçu River overflowing. Another 5 deaths from these systems were reported., a dam overflowed in Crisólita and in the city of Monte Formoso, were registered 331 millimeters (13 in). 31 cities in Minas Gerais were in a state of emergency.

=== Floods in southern Bahia ===
The floods in southern Bahia began on 7 December 2021, with heavy rains that hit the region. Among the most affected cities in south of the state are Itamaraju, Eunápolis and Itabela, where a strong rise in river levels and slides of land. Other cities are also being affected, requiring air assistance to rescue and supply basic items. In Ilhéus, the pool of a luxury resort overflowed, and some guests had to be transferred to another hotel The government of Bahia decreed an emergency situation in 24 municipalities on the 9th. News of deaths and disappearances circulated in the media, more than a thousand displaced people are estimated.

== See also ==
- Weather of 2021
- Tropical cyclones of 2021
- Subtropical Storm Yakecan (2022) – likewise caused major effects in southeastern South America
- Tornado outbreak of December 10-11, 2021 – another deadly weather event that occurred while Ubá was active
