= Pasipha atla =

Scientific classification
- Kingdom: Animalia
- Phylum: Platyhelminthes
- Order: Tricladida
- Family: Geoplanidae
- Genus: Pasipha
- Species: P. atla

Binomial name
- Pasipha atla Negrete & Brusa, 2016

Species of flatworm

Pasipha atla is a species of land planarian belonging to the subfamily Geoplaninae. It is found within Argentina.

== Description ==
Pasipha atla has an elongate body with parallel margins, reaching around 35–48 mm in length. The anterior tip is blunt while the posterior is pointed. The dorsum is a dark brown color, with a whitish median stripe in the cephalic and posterior regions. The ventral side of the body is a greyish color.

== Etymology ==
The specific epithet is derived from the initials of two park managers at the Urugua-í Provincial Park, Ariel Tombo and Laura Aréjola (A. T., L. A.), "in gratefulness of their valuable assistance during fieldwork".

== Distribution ==
P. atla is only known to be found in Misiones Province, Argentina, having been found in the San Antonio Strict Nature Reserve and in Urugua-í Provincial Park.
