= Pasipha tutameia =

Scientific classification
- Kingdom: Animalia
- Phylum: Platyhelminthes
- Order: Tricladida
- Family: Geoplanidae
- Genus: Pasipha
- Species: P. tutameia

Binomial name
- Pasipha tutameia Amaral & Leal-Zanchet, 2019

Species of flatworm

Pasipha tutameia is a species of land planarian belonging to the subfamily Geoplaninae. It is found within Brazil.

== Description ==
Pasipha tutameia has an elongate body with parallel margins and a rounded front tip, reaching up to about 42 mm in length. Though not known in life, only after fixation, the dorsum is brown in color, with a pale brown median band and a narrow dark median stripe. There are flecks all across the dorsum, with the exception of the anterior tip, which sometimes concentrate on the borders of the pale median band. The ventral side of the body is pale gray.

Additionally, in regards to internal anatomy, certain features in combination distinguish it from other members of the genus. P. tutameia lacks a glandular margin. The pharynx is collar-form in shape. The prostatic vesicle has a globose proximal portion, and a pear-shaped distal portion. P. tutameia additionally has an inverted penis, unique among species of Pasipha, which is long and folded. The female atrium is short and funnel-shaped.

== Etymology ==
The specific epithet of tutameia was given in reference to the tale book Tutameia – Terceiras Estórias by Brazilian author João Guimarães Rosa; Rosa was born in Cordisburgo, the type locality of P. tutameia.

== Distribution ==
P. tutameia is known from its type locality; it was found in the Gruta Santo Amaro II Cave, within the municipality of Cordisburgo, Minas Gerais, Brazil.
