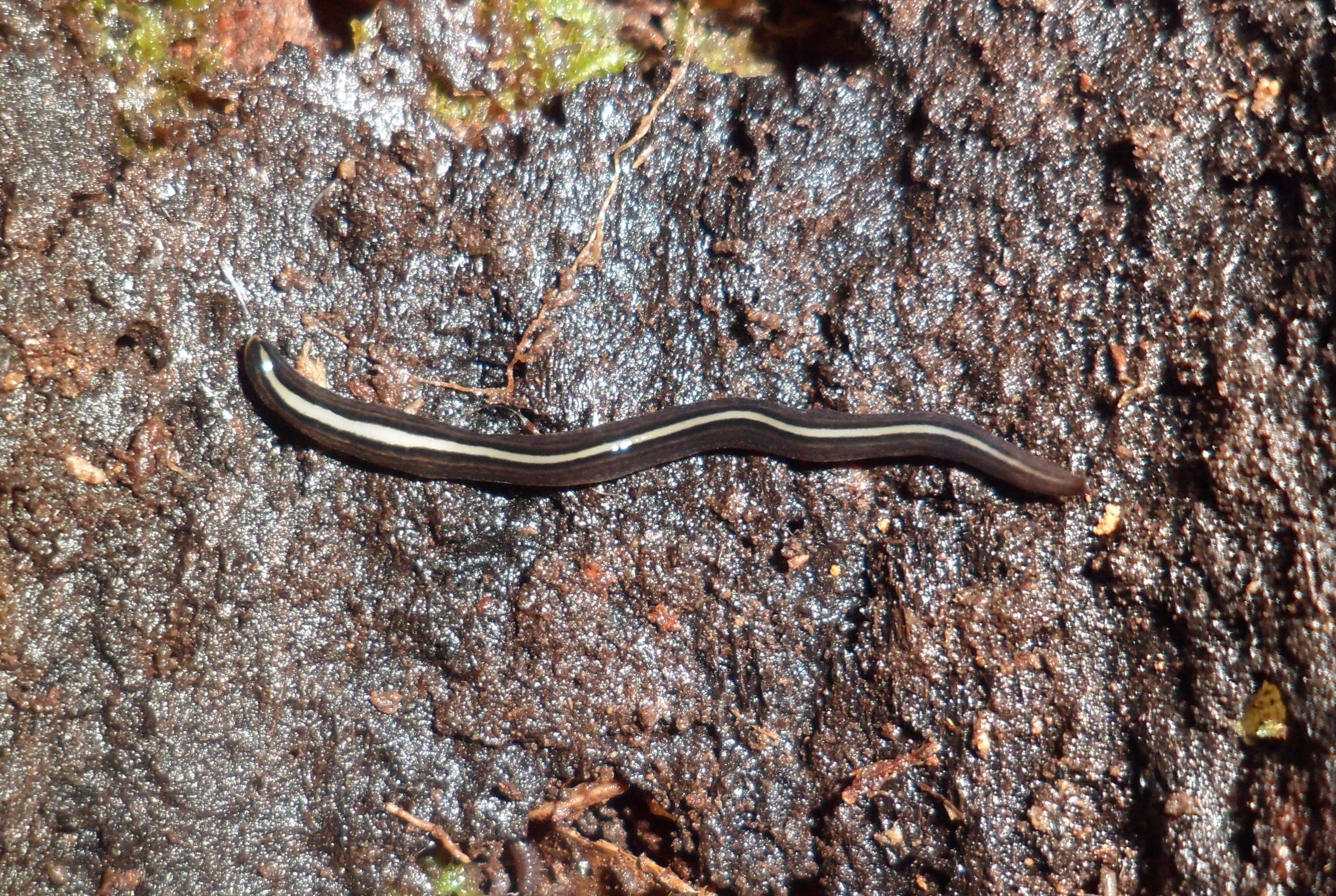
- Pasipha backesi

Scientific classification
- Kingdom: Animalia
- Phylum: Platyhelminthes
- Order: Tricladida
- Family: Geoplanidae
- Subfamily: Geoplaninae
- Genus: Pasipha; Ogren & Kawakatsu, 1990

Type species
- Geoplana pasipha Marcus, 1951

= Pasipha =

Genus of flatworms

Pasipha is a genus of land planarians from South America.

== Description ==
Species of the genus Pasipha have a slender and flattened body with parallel margins while creeping. The copulatory apparatus lacks a permanent penis, having a long and highly folded male atrium instead. The prostatic vesicle is located outside the muscular coat of the copulatory apparatus and divided in two portions. The female canal enters the genital antrum ventrally.

== Etymology ==
The name of Pasipha is derived from the specific epithet of the type species, Pasipha pasipha, known as Geoplana pasipha prior to the creation of the genus.

== Species ==
There are 29 species assigned to the genus Pasipha:

- Pasipha albicaudata Amaral & Leal-Zanchet, 2018
- Pasipha astraea (Marcus, 1951)
- Pasipha atla Negrete & Brusa, 2016
- Pasipha backesi Leal-Zanchet, Rossi & Seitenfus, 2012
- Pasipha brevilineata Leal-Zanchet, Rossi & Alvarenga, 2012
- Pasipha caeruleonigra (Riester, 1938)
- Pasipha cafusa (Froehlich, 1956)
- Pasipha carajaensis Amaral & Leal-Zanchet, 2019
- Pasipha chimbeva (E.M. Froehlich, 1955)
- Pasipha ferrariaphila Leal-Zanchet & Marques, 2018
- Pasipha hauseri (Froehlich, 1959)
- Pasipha johnsoni Negrete & Brusa, 2016
- Pasipha liviae Marques & Leal-Zanchet, 2022
- Pasipha mbya Negrete & Brusa, 2016
- Pasipha mesoxantha Amaral & Leal-Zanchet, 2016
- Pasipha oliverioi (Froehlich, 1955)
- Pasipha pasipha (Marcus, 1951)
- Pasipha paucilineata Amaral & Leal-Zanchet, 2018
- Pasipha penhana (Riester, 1938)
- Pasipha pinima (E.M. Froehlich, 1955)
- Pasipha plana (Schirch, 1929)
- Pasipha quirogai Negrete & Brusa, 2017
- Pasipha rosea (E.M. Froehlich, 1955)
- Pasipha splendida (von Graff, 1899)
- Pasipha tapetilla (Marcus, 1951)
- Pasipha turvensis Amaral & Leal-Zanchet, 2016
- Pasipha tutameia Amaral & Leal-Zanchet, 2019
- Pasipha variistriata Amaral & Leal-Zanchet, 2018
- Pasipha velutina (Riester, 1938)

Also, there are some species currently considered incertae sedis:

- Pasipha aphalla (Hyman, 1941)
- Pasipha diminutiva (Hyman, 1955)
- Pasipha ercilla (E.M. Froehlich, 1978)
- Pasipha chilensis (von Graff, 1899)
- Pasipha velina (E.M. Froehlich, 1955)
- Pasipha weyrauchi (Du Bois-Reymond Marcus, 1951)
