= Pasipha mbya =

Scientific classification
- Kingdom: Animalia
- Phylum: Platyhelminthes
- Order: Tricladida
- Family: Geoplanidae
- Genus: Pasipha
- Species: P. mbya

Binomial name
- Pasipha mbya Negrete & Brusa, 2016

Species of flatworm

Pasipha mbya is a species of land planarian belonging to the subfamily Geoplaninae. It is found within Argentina.

== Description ==
Pasipha mbya has an elongate body with parallel margins, reaching up to 46 mm in length. The front tip of the body is slightly rounded, while the back tip is pointed. The dorsum is a dark grey color, with a yellow band extending along the middle of the body. The band is mottled with black spots and is bordered by thin black stripes at the para-median level. The ventral side of the body is light grey.

== Etymology ==
The specific epithet of mbya was given in devotion to the Mbyá Guaraní people, the native people of Misiones Province and its rainforests, where the type specimens of P. mbya were found.

== Distribution ==
P. mbya is only known to be found in Misiones, Argentina, having been found in Urugua-í Provincial Park and Iguazú National Park.
