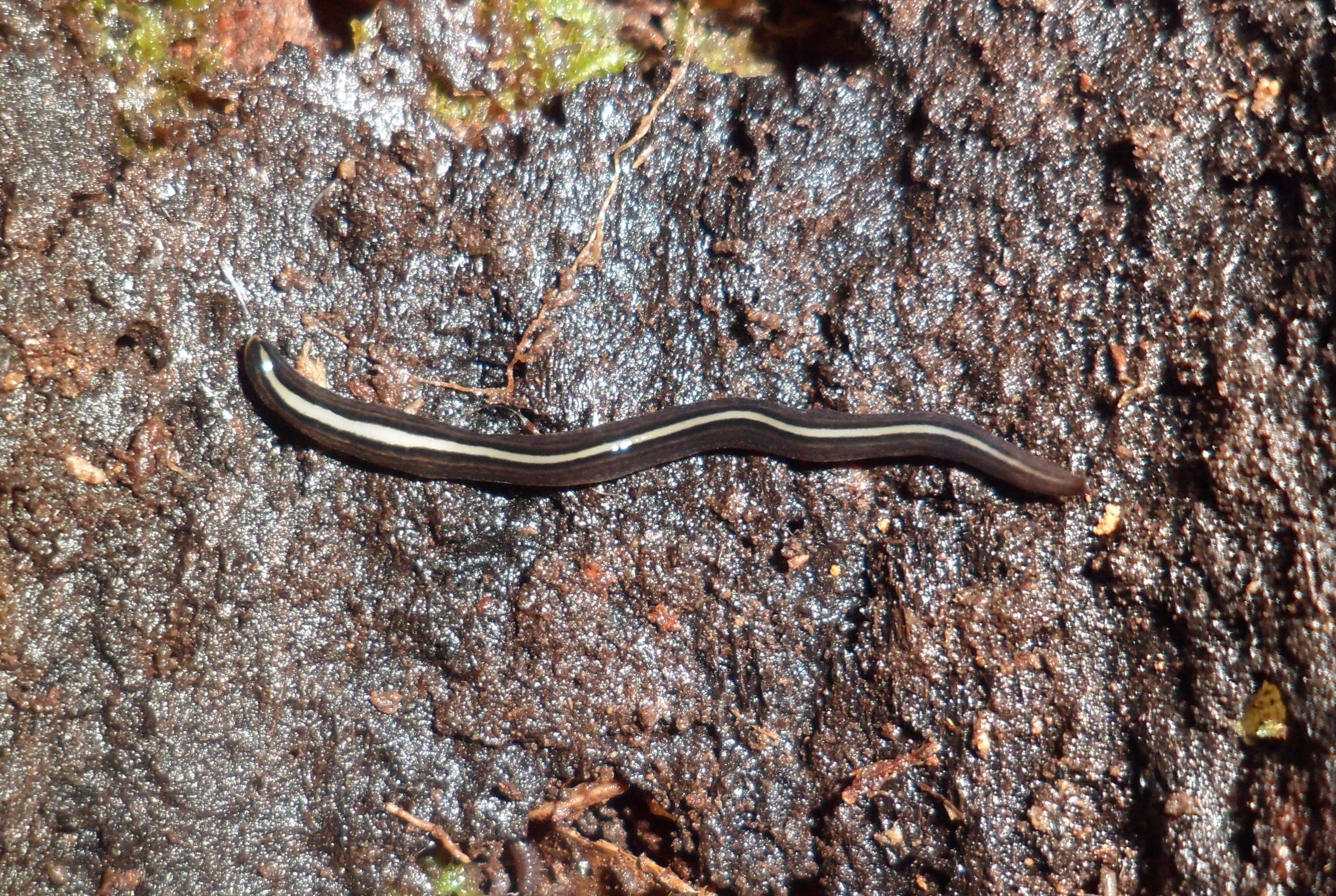

Scientific classification
- Kingdom: Animalia
- Phylum: Platyhelminthes
- Order: Tricladida
- Family: Geoplanidae
- Genus: Pasipha
- Species: P. backesi

Binomial name
- Pasipha backesi Leal-Zanchet, Rossi & Seitenfus, 2012

= Pasipha backesi =

Species of flatworm

Pasipha backesi is a species of land planarian belonging to the subfamily Geoplaninae. It is found within Brazil.

== Description ==
Pasipha backesi has an elongate body with parallel margins, known to reach up to 33 mm in length. The dorsum is a brown color, with a yellowish median stripe bordered by paramedian stripes ranging from dark brown to black in color. Though not usually visible to the naked eye, the ground color of the dorsum is a pale brown visible on the margins and anterior tip of the dorsum. Two dark brown lateral stripes are also present on the dorsum. The ventral side of the body is a greyish, pale yellow with a dark grey anterior tip.

== Etymology ==
The specific epithet of backesi was given in honor of Dr. Albano Backes, of Unisinos, in recognition of his contributions to knowledge of the ecology of the Araucaria moist forests.

== Distribution ==
P. backesi is only known to be found in the state of Rio Grande do Sul, Brazil, having been found in the municipality of São Francisco de Paula.
