= Pasipha hauseri =

Scientific classification
- Kingdom: Animalia
- Phylum: Platyhelminthes
- Order: Tricladida
- Family: Geoplanidae
- Genus: Pasipha
- Species: P. hauseri

Binomial name
- Pasipha hauseri (Froehlich, 1959) Ogren & Kawakatsu, 1990

Synonyms
- Geoplana hauseri Froehlich, 1959

Species of flatworm

Pasipha hauseri is a species of land planarian belonging to the subfamily Geoplaninae. It is found within Brazil.

== Description ==
Pasipha hauseri has a flattened body that can reach to about 8 cm in length. The dorsum is greyish-brown, with a light median stripe. The greyish-brown pigment of the dorsum darkens as it borders the median stripe. The ventral side of the body is ivory.

== Etymology ==
The origin of the specific epithet is not specified, but it is likely given in honor of Josef Hauser, who collected the type specimens.
