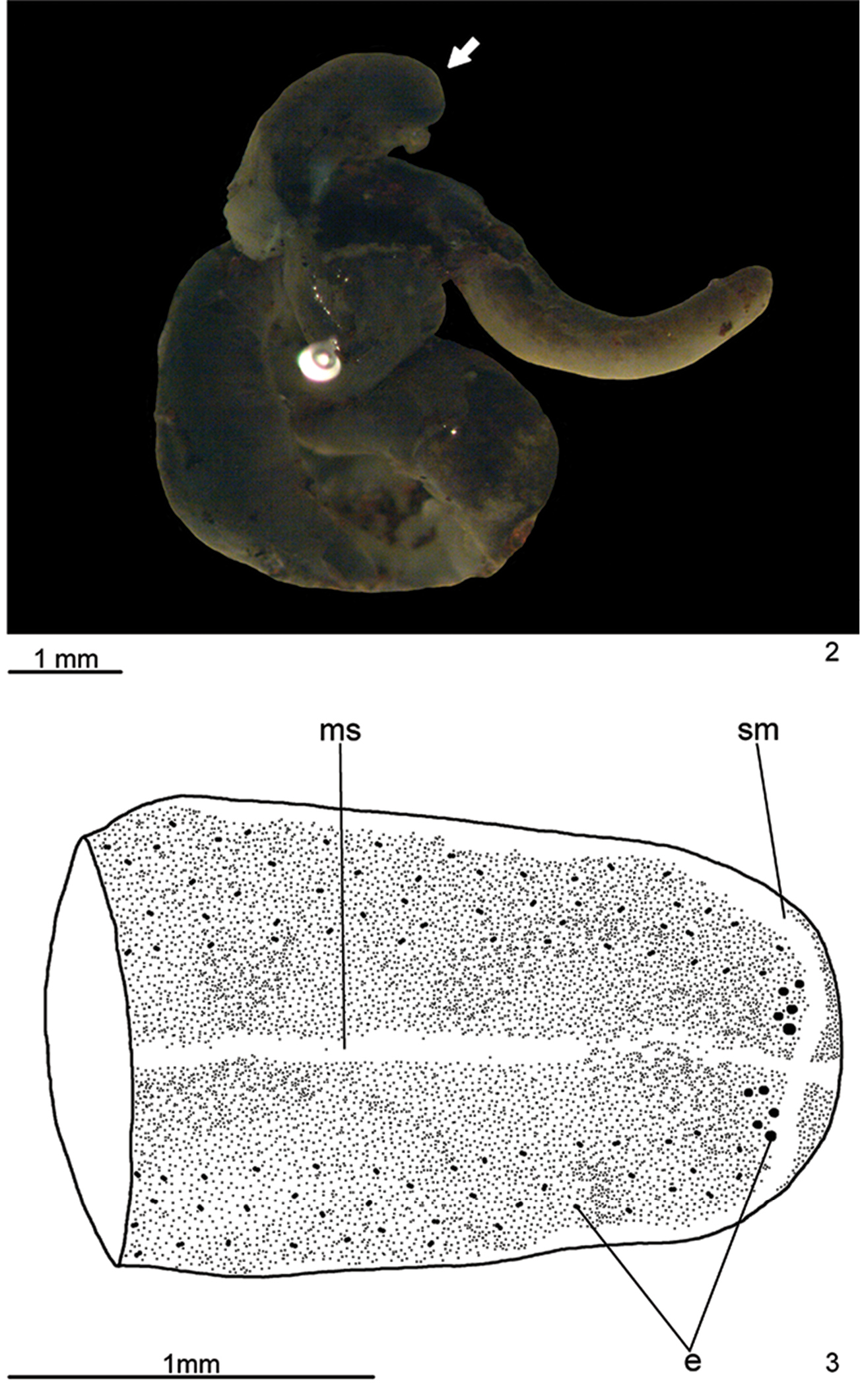

Scientific classification
- Kingdom: Animalia
- Phylum: Platyhelminthes
- Order: Tricladida
- Family: Geoplanidae
- Genus: Pasipha
- Species: P. ferrariaphila

Binomial name
- Pasipha ferrariaphila Leal-Zanchet & Marques, 2018

= Pasipha ferrariaphila =

Species of flatworm

Pasipha ferrariaphila is a species of land planarian belonging to the subfamily Geoplaninae. It is found within Brazil.

== Description ==
Pasipha ferrariaphila has an elongate body with parallel margins, a rounded front tip, and a pointed back tip, around 22 mm in length. The dorsum is a homogeneous dark brown color, which is pigment covering a light brown base, visible under a microscope as a thin median stripe. The ventral side of the body is pale yellow.

Additionally, in regards to internal anatomy, certain features in combination distinguish it from other members of the genus. The pharynx is collar-form in shape. The prostatic vesicle has two portions separated by a canal. The ejaculatory duct is long and spacious. The male and female atria are separated by a constriction, and the female atrium is spacious and long.

== Etymology ==
The specific epithet is derived from the Latin word ferraria, meaning "of or relating to iron", and the Greek word φίλος (phílos), meaning "affinity". This is in reference to the sampling site where the holotype was found, the entrance zone of a ferruginous cave.

== Distribution ==
P. ferrariaphila is known from its type locality; it was found in the municipality of Conceição do Mato Dentro, Minas Gerais, Brazil.
