= Pasipha johnsoni =

Scientific classification
- Kingdom: Animalia
- Phylum: Platyhelminthes
- Order: Tricladida
- Family: Geoplanidae
- Genus: Pasipha
- Species: P. johnsoni

Binomial name
- Pasipha johnsoni Negrete & Brusa, 2016

Species of flatworm

Pasipha johnsoni is a species of land planarian belonging to the subfamily Geoplaninae. It is found within Argentina.

== Description ==
Pasipha johnsoni has an elongate body with parallel margins that can reach up to 4 cm in length. The front tip of the body is rounded, while the back tip is pointed. The dorsum is a dark grey color with two black lateral stripes running down the entire dorsal side, with the exception of the cephalic region, where they are light grey. The color of the dorsal pigment lightens towards the margins. The ventral side of the body is light grey.

== Etymology ==
The specific epithet of johnsoni was given in honor of naturalist Andrés Johnson for significantly contributing to the knowledge of Atlantic Forest biodiversity within Argentina.

== Distribution ==
P. johnsoni is only known to be found in the Urugua-í Wildlife reserve within Urugua-í Provincial Park in Misiones, Argentina.
