= Gravataí =

Municipality of Rio Grande do Sul, Brazil

- Municipality
- The Municipality of Gravataí
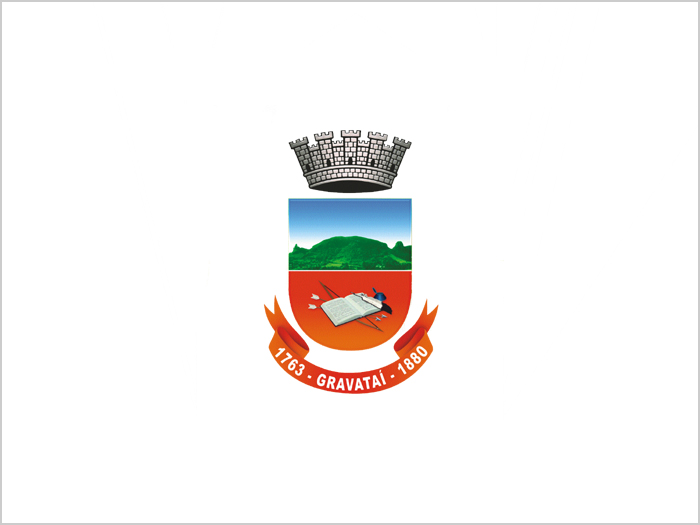
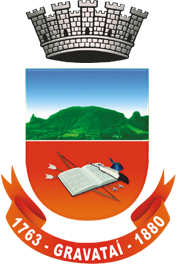
- Flag Coat of arms
- Nickname: City of Bromelias

- Location in Brazil
- Coordinates: 29°56′38″S 50°59′31″W
- Country: Brazil
- Region: South
- State: Rio Grande do Sul
- Settled: 1763
- Incorporated (city): 1880
- Current limits: 1988

Government
  - Type: Mayor-Council
  - Mayor: Luiz Ariano Zaffalon (PSDB)

Area
  - Total: 468.288 km^{2} (180.807 sq mi)
- Elevation: 26 m (85 ft)

Population (2022 Brazilian census])
  - Total: 265,070
  - Estimate (2025): 275,430
  - Density: 566/km^{2} (1,470/sq mi)
- Demonym: Gravataiense
- Time zone: UTC−3 (BRT)
- Postal Code: 94000-000
- Area code: +55 51
- HDI (2010): 0.736
- HDI Rank: RS: 179º BR: 876º
- Gini (est. IBGE 2003): 0.41
- GDP (2020): R$ 10,640,983.01 million
- GDP Rank: RS: 4º BR: 114º
- GDP per capita (2020): R$ 37,518.45
- Website: Prefeitura de Gravataí

Gravataí is a Brazilian municipality in the state of Rio Grande do Sul, located north of the state capital, approximately 23 km away. It is one of the 32 municipalities within the Porto Alegre Metropolitan Region (RMPA). The municipality covers an area of 463.758 square kilometres (179.058 sq mi), with 121.37 square kilometres (46.86 sq mi) designated as the urban area, and its population was recorded in 2022 as 265,070 inhabitants, making it the sixth most populous municipality in the state and the third in the RMPA.

Gravataí was initially established in 1763, with official emancipation occurring in 1880. The name is believed to derive from a combination of gravatá, a species of Apiaceae (formerly Umbelliferae) abundant in the region, and hy, meaning river in the Guarani language. Today, the municipality's primary economic driver is the industrial sector, with the Gravataí Automotive Industrial Complex of General Motors serving as a significant source of revenue, positioning the city as a hub for Brazil's metal-mechanical industry.

The municipality also boasts a rich cultural heritage that includes handicrafts, theater, music and sports. One of its most prominent and traditional football clubs is the Cerâmica Atlético Clube, founded in April 1950. Gravataí hosts several annual events, including the Feast of Our Lady of Navigators, the Bromeliad Festival, and the Gravataí International Cycling Tour, alongside notable tourist attractions such as the Agostinho Martha Municipal Museum, which showcases the colonial history of the Gravataí River Valley.

== History ==
=== Origins ===
During the expansion of its territories to South America in the 18th century, the Portuguese Crown granted sesmaria letters of concession to settlers already residing in the region to encourage settlement. Pedro Gonçalves Sandoval, a native of Lima, Peru, received the first sesmaria for inhabiting the area known as the Gravataí corner, within the fields of Viamão. During this period, Captain João Lourenço Veloso also received a sesmaria, taking possession of lands in the same region, further northeast, near Morro Itacolomi. Part of these lands was later purchased by the Portuguese Crown to establish the Aldeia dos Anjos (Village of the Angels). This was the initial settlement of the village, which was later relocated to the current central area of Gravataí.

Since pre-colonial times, Portugal and Spain had been encroaching on each other's territories. To address this, they signed the Treaty of Madrid in 1750, stipulating that Portugal would return the Sacramento Colony, established in Spanish territory, in exchange for the Seven Towns of the Missions, located further northeast. To populate the Seven Towns of the Missions, the Portuguese planned to bring settlers from the densely populated Azores archipelago. As a result of this agreement and the subsequent Treaty of San Ildefonso (1777), the Guarani inhabitants of the Seven Towns of the Missions were required to leave the region. Unwilling to abandon their lands, the Guarani initiated the Guarani War. Following the war, thousands of indigenous people fled to Portuguese territory, settling near the Rio Pardo, now known as the Santa Maria River. From this group of refugees, approximately one thousand Guarani were brought in 1762 by Captain Antônio Pinto de Carneiro to the vicinity of the Gravataí River, marking the beginning of the Aldeia dos Anjos settlement. Notably, the village existed in practice before its official founding date of April 8, 1763. Due to the turmoil caused by the Guarani War, the Azorean settlers originally intended for the Seven Towns of the Missions were redirected to other areas, namely the Jacuí River Valley (in the center of the state) and the Gravataí River Valley.

With the arrival of José Marcelino de Figueiredo, Governor of the São Pedro Province, in 1772, the Aldeia dos Anjos began to flourish. Figueiredo urbanized the settlement, constructing schools, brick kilns, and mills. The Tapes Indians, refugees from the Jesuit Missions in Uruguay, were settled in Gravataí by Figueiredo, who taught them wheat cultivation, a practice they later adopted.

=== Administrative and political formation ===
With the establishment of the first four municipalities in Rio Grande do Sul on October 7, 1809, the Aldeia dos Anjos was elevated to the status of a district of Porto Alegre. On June 11, 1880, due to the heavy traffic of carts carrying goods, primarily from the North Coast and Santo Antônio da Patrulha, it was upgraded to a vila (town). Four months later, on October 23, 1880, the municipality of Gravataí was officially established. The name originates from the Guarani language, where gravatá refers to a species of Apiaceae, mistakenly classified as a Bromeliad, abundant in the region, and hy translates to river. Until the late 19th century, the correct spelling of the municipality was "Gravatahy," literally meaning "River of the Gravatás."

By provincial act no. 1578 of April 24, 1886, the districts of Glória and Costa do Ipiranga were created. By municipal act no. 48 of December 26, 1912, the district of Canoas was established. By municipal law no. 99 of July 20, 1917, the district of Butiá was created. By municipal law no. 3 of June 7, 1957, the district of Cachoeirinha was formed. By municipal law no. 1 of January 8, 1958, the district of Ipiranga was created. By municipal law no. 302 of January 9, 1958, the district of Dom Feliciano was established. By municipal law no. 719 of November 4, 1966, the district of Barnabé was created. By municipal decree no. 1396 of December 29, 1977, the district of Barro Vermelho was formed. By municipal law no. 121 of May 16, 1983, the district of Itacolomi was created. Over the years, several of these districts were either elevated to city status or dissolved, leaving five districts today: Gravataí, Barro Vermelho, Ipiranga, Itacolomi, and Morungava.

=== Economic and social development ===
In the final decades of the 19th century, the region experienced significant growth, largely driven by the cultivation of cassava and the export of its flour to other parts of Brazil and abroad through the Passo das Canoas. Cassava flour production fueled economic development in the municipality until the first half of the 20th century. In the 1930s, José Loureiro da Silva took over the municipal government, marking a significant developmental phase for Gravataí. His key achievements included the implementation of the city's electrical system, the widening and paving of initial streets, the construction of a road connecting Gravataí to Porto Alegre, and the current urban planning of the city center.

From the 1960s onward, the city underwent rapid industrialization. Key factors in transitioning from an agrarian economy included the construction of the BR-290 highway (also known as the "Freeway") and the establishment of an industrial district. This development, combined with the growth of neighboring cities, led to the creation of the Porto Alegre Metropolitan Region on June 8, 1973, by federal complementary law no. 14, encompassing Gravataí and 31 other municipalities. By 2001, with nearly four million inhabitants, it was the 102nd largest urban agglomeration globally.

=== Recent history ===
A pivotal event for the city's economy was the establishment of the General Motors Industrial Complex between the late 1990s and early 2000s. The announcement of its establishment on March 17, 1997, marked a milestone in the municipality's development, as the company joined the large-scale industrial park and local commerce. The complex solidified the city's industrial profile and established Gravataí as one of Brazil's major metal-mechanical industry hubs.

In recent years, rural areas have increasingly been replaced by urban areas to meet the demands of urban expansion, driven by the growth of productive activities (industry, commerce, and services) and rising housing needs due to population concentration. The boundary between rural and urban areas is becoming less distinct, with the rural population declining annually.

== Geography ==
According to the Brazilian Institute of Geography and Statistics, the municipality spans an area of 463.758 square kilometres (179.058 sq mi), with 121.37 square kilometres (46.86 sq mi) forming the urban area and the remaining 376.45 square kilometres (145.35 sq mi) comprising the rural area. It is located at 22°56'36" south latitude and 50°59'38" west longitude, approximately 22 kilometers south of the state capital, and is part of the Porto Alegre Metropolitan Region (RMPA). Its neighboring municipalities are Novo Hamburgo and Taquara to the north; Alvorada and Viamão to the south; Glorinha to the east; and Cachoeirinha and Sapucaia do Sul to the west.

=== Geomorphology, geology, and hydrography ===
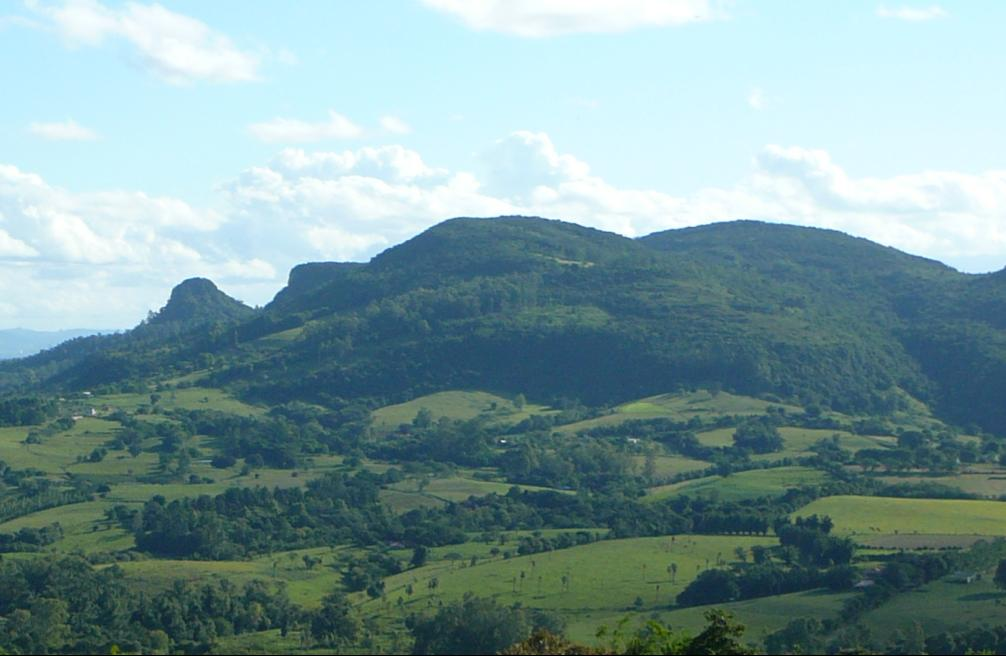
View of Morro Itacolomi, a significant rocky formation in the city, declared a cultural heritage site of Rio Grande do Sul in 2003 by state law No. 149.

The terrain of Gravataí and the Porto Alegre Metropolitan Region is characterized by three major morphostructural domains: sedimentary deposits, sedimentary basins, and sedimentary covers, alongside complex basement structures. The geology of the RMPA is defined by four tectono-structural domains, distinguished by their depositional environment, origin, litho-structural characteristics, and age. These include the Canguçu Ridge (represented by the Arroio dos Ratos Gneissic Complex, comprising orthogneisses ranging from tonalitic to granodiorite), the Dom Feliciano Belt (consisting of undeformed granite rocks associated with acidic volcanic rocks such as dacites, rhyolites, and rhyodacites), the Paraná Basin (represented by rocks from the Permian and Triassic periods), and the Coastal Plain and Alluvia.

Among the various geological formations found in the municipality, those with the lowest fossil potential are the most widespread: Quaternary deposits, the Serra Geral Formation, and the Botucatu Formation. However, localized occurrences of highly fossiliferous geological units can be found in Gravataí, including the Rio do Rasto Formation, the Estrada Nova Formation, and the Rio Bonito Formation. These units represent Permian deposits (295–245 million years old) in the state, containing records of life from the end of the Paleozoic period. Fossil records of animals and plants are also reported for these formations in various other regions of the state.

The municipality is primarily situated within the Gravataí River hydrographic basin, with a smaller portion in the Sinos River basin. The Gravataí River originates in Santo Antônio da Patrulha, and its sources are not clearly defined, as the flooded plains form a channel that narrows over 16 km. From the point known as Passo do Vau, the narrowest part of this channel corresponding to the funneling of the wetlands, to its mouth, the river extends 39 km. Most urbanized areas along the riverbed are concentrated in its lower section. The streams that flow into the right bank of the Gravataí River include the Pinto Stream, Demétrio Stream, Barnabé Stream, Brigadeiro Stream, and Grande Stream.

=== Climate ===
The climate of Gravataí is subtropical (classified as Cfah under the Köppen climate classification), with two distinct seasons: warm summers and cold winters. This is influenced by both its latitude and the effects of anticyclones from the Atlantic Ocean and the mobile polar anticyclone. The warmest month, February, has an average temperature of 25.5°C, with an average high of 30°C and a low of 21°C. The coldest months, June and July, have an average temperature of 15°C, with average highs of 19°C and lows of 11°C. The region is predominantly affected by winds from the southern and eastern quadrants, originating from subtropical high-pressure systems common in the area due to its geographical position.

Precipitation is characterized by consistent rainfall distribution throughout the year, with no distinct dry season. However, dry periods occasionally occur due to the absence of the mobile polar anticyclone's influence. The average annual precipitation is 1,346 millimetres (53.0 in), with April being the driest month, recording 86 millimetres (3.4 in). August and September, the wettest months, average 140 millimetres (5.5 in). During the rainy season, flooding and landslides are common in some areas. Hailstorms are rare in the city, but a notable event occurred on August 27, 2010.

According to data from Weather Base, the highest recorded temperature in the city was 41°C, while the lowest was -4°C. Data from the Center for Weather Forecasting and Climate Studies (CPTEC) and the National Institute for Space Research (INPE) indicate that, between August 1991 and August 2001, the highest 24-hour rainfall accumulation was 116 mm on July 23, 2001. Other significant accumulations included 108 mm on July 29, 1995; 95 mm on July 5, 1993; 93 mm on July 10, 2000; 89 mm on June 10 and November 5, 1999; and 87 mm on June 19, 1994.

Climate data for Gravataí
Month	Jan	Feb	Mar	Apr	May	Jun	Jul	Aug	Sep	Oct	Nov	Dec	Year
Record high °C (°F)	39 (102)	41 (106)	39 (102)	36 (97)	33 (91)	32 (90)	33 (91)	33 (91)	36 (97)	38 (100)	38 (100)	39 (102)	41 (106)
Mean daily maximum °C (°F)	30 (86)	30 (86)	28 (82)	25 (77)	22 (72)	19 (66)	19 (66)	20 (68)	22 (72)	24 (75)	27 (81)	29 (84)	24.6 (76.3)
Mean daily minimum °C (°F)	20 (68)	21 (70)	19 (66)	16 (61)	13 (55)	11 (52)	11 (52)	11 (52)	13 (55)	15 (59)	17 (63)	19 (66)	15.5 (59.9)
Record low °C (°F)	10 (50)	11 (52)	9 (48)	4 (39)	−1 (30)	−2 (28)	−4 (25)	−1 (30)	0 (32)	4 (39)	5 (41)	8 (46)	−4 (25)
Average precipitation mm (inches)	99 (3.9)	109 (4.3)	104 (4.1)	86 (3.4)	94 (3.7)	132 (5.2)	122 (4.8)	140 (5.5)	140 (5.5)	114 (4.5)	104 (4.1)	102 (4.0)	1,346 (53.0)
Average precipitation days	5.8	5.4	6	6.2	6.8	8.8	7.8	8.6	7.5	5.7	5.3	5.8	79.7
Source 1: The Weather Channel
Source 2: Weather Base

=== Ecology and environment ===
Gravataí features a variety of original and anthropic vegetation formations in both urban and rural areas. These include: Pioneer Formations (found in the low, flood-prone plains of the Gravataí River, with diverse vegetation dominated by shrubby and arboreal species); Seasonal Semideciduous Forest (once present in a forest in the northern part of the city, now largely replaced by housing developments and industries, with only a few remnants remaining); Secondary Vegetation (naturally occupying areas where original forest, shrub, and herbaceous vegetation has been removed); Agriculture and Reforestation (areas previously covered by forests now used for agriculture, livestock, orchards, and reforestation); and Urban Vegetation, located in squares, parks, and public thoroughfares.

The city currently has 22 tree-lined squares, many featuring native species. There are three parks with abundant green spaces, two of which are publicly maintained: the Jayme Caetano Brum, covering 13,837.92 m², and the Parcão da '79', spanning 29,000.00 m². The third, Pampas Safari, is a private park covering 320 hectares, home to over 1,300 specimens of global fauna, making it the largest safari park in South America. The municipal administration, guided by the Urban Tree Code, is responsible for adapting the city's tree planting to environmental conditions, using appropriate plant species for each context. Gravataí also has three conservation units: the Banhado Grande Ecological Reserve, established by the state through Decree No. 38,971 of October 23, 1998, covering 400 hectares; Morro Itacolomi, considered an ecological and scenic preservation area with native vegetation; and the São Pedro Province Estate, spanning 400 hectares with native tree cover.

== Demography ==
According to the 2022 IBGE data, the municipality's population is 265,070 inhabitants, making it the sixth most populous municipality in the state, with a population density of 566.04 inhabitants per km². According to the 2000 census, 49.38% of the population were men (114,777 inhabitants), 50.62% were women (117,670 inhabitants), 91.19% (211,969 inhabitants) lived in the urban area, and 8.81% (20,478 inhabitants) resided in the rural area. In 2000, according to IBGE census data, the population of Gravataí consisted of 204,506 Whites (87.91%), 15,155 Blacks (6.51%), 10,757 Pardos (4.62%), 257 Asians (0.11%), 1,131 Indigenous (0.49%), and 822 undeclared (0.35%).

The Municipal Human Development Index (HDI-M) of Gravataí is considered high by the United Nations Development Programme (UNDP), with a value of 0.736, ranking 180th in Rio Grande do Sul (out of 496 municipalities), 393rd in Southern Brazil (out of 1,188), and 876th nationwide (out of 5,565). The city’s indicators are generally average and align with national averages according to the UNDP.

The Gini coefficient, which measures social inequality, is 0.41, where 1.00 represents the worst score and 0 represents the best. In 2003, the poverty incidence, as measured by IBGE, was 29.39%, with a lower limit of 17.37%, an upper limit of 41.41%, and a subjective poverty incidence of 20.96%.

Demographic evolution of Gravataí

Year	Pop.	±%
1872	5,852	—
1890	9,694	+65.7%
1900	12,855	+32.6%
1920	20,394	+58.6%
1940	22,894	+12.3%

Year	Pop.	±%
1950	27,853	+21.7%
1960	45,951	+65.0%
1970	52,462	+14.2%
1980	107,437	+104.8%
1990	173,396	+61.4%

Year	Pop.	±%
2000	232,629	+34.2%
2010	255,660	+9.9%
2022	265,070	+3.7%

1. Canoas became independent from Gravataí in 1939.

2. Cachoeirinha became independent from Gravataí in 1966.

3. Glorinha became independent from Gravataí in 1988

=== Religion ===
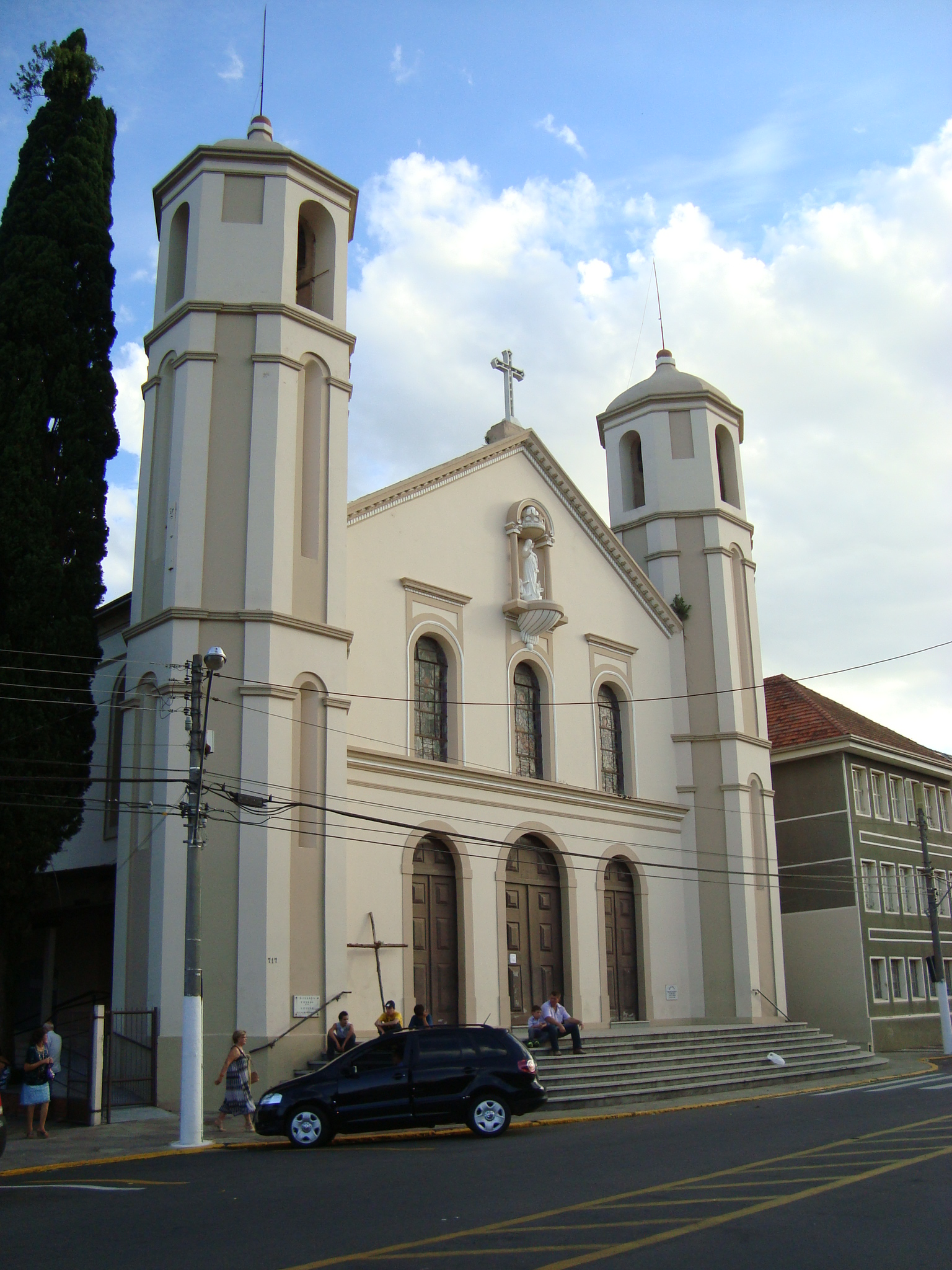
Facade of the Nossa Senhora dos Anjos Church

Reflecting the cultural diversity of Gravataí, the city is home to a wide range of religious expressions. While it developed on a predominantly Catholic social foundation, numerous Protestant denominations are now present.

The city is home to various Protestant or Reformed denominations, including the Assembly of God, Maranata Christian Church, Presbyterian Church, Baptist churches, the Seventh-day Adventist Church, and the Universal Church of the Kingdom of God, among others. According to the 2000 IBGE census, Gravataí’s population comprised Catholics (77.27%), Evangelicals (12.50%), non-religious individuals (4.72%), Umbandists (1.82%), Spiritists (1.64%), and 2.06% belonging to other religions.

The Nossa Senhora dos Anjos Church, located in the city center and inaugurated in 1772 in the Portuguese Baroque style, became the seat of the Vicariate of Gravataí under the Archdiocese of Porto Alegre, the ecclesiastical circumscription to which the municipality belongs, in 2001. This Vicariate is further divided into four pastoral areas and 28 parishes, encompassing Gravataí, Alvorada, Cachoeirinha, and Viamão. Gravataí is also the birthplace of the first bishop of Rio Grande do Sul, Feliciano José Rodrigues de Araújo Prates, born on July 13, 1781, in what was then the Aldeia dos Anjos. Feliciano received the subdiaconate on November 20, 1803, and the diaconate on November 27, 1803, both conferred by the bishop of São Paulo, Dom Mateus de Abreu Pereira, at the Lapa Seminary Chapel in Rio de Janeiro.

== Government and politics ==
The first intendant of the municipality was João Maria da Fonseca, and the first executive leader and mayor of the municipality was José Loureiro da Silva. Over 29 terms, 22 mayors have governed Gravataí, in addition to eight executive agents.

The legislative power is represented by the municipal chamber, composed of 21 councilors elected for four-year terms. The chamber is responsible for drafting and voting on fundamental laws for the administration and the Executive, particularly the municipal budget (known as the Budget Guidelines Law).

Gravataí operates under an organic law established on April 2, 1990. The city also serves as the seat of a comarca. In 2010, the municipality had 173,945 voters, the seventh largest electorate in the state, including 2,614 illiterate voters and 2,835 voters under 18 years old.

=== International relations ===
The Azorean community of Horta has been a sister city of Gravataí since 2023.

== Subdivisions ==
Gravataí is divided into five districts: Barro Vermelho, Ipiranga, Itacolomi, Morungava, and the Seat. In 2000, these districts had populations of 4,085, 4,048, 6,073, 5,920, and 202,503 inhabitants, respectively, according to the IBGE census of that year. Throughout the 20th century, several districts were created, elevated to city status, or dissolved, with the last change occurring on May 16, 1983, with the creation of Itacolomi.Gravataí currently has just over 70 neighborhoods, in addition to villages and settlements, with Morada do Vale being the most populous, with approximately 40,000 inhabitants. The poorest areas of the city are the neighborhoods of Nova Conquista, Nova Esperança, and Antônio Carlos Jobim, where there is still a lack of paving, slope containment works, stormwater drainage, sewage systems, water and electricity networks, and land leveling.

== Economy ==
The gross domestic product (GDP) of Gravataí is the 79th largest in Brazil, with a strong emphasis on the industrial sector. According to 2008 IBGE data, the municipality’s GDP was R$ 5,352,575.064 thousand. 963,321 thousand were taxes on products net of subsidies at current prices. The per capita GDP was R$ 27,689, and the Income Human Development Index (HDI-R) was 0.727 in 2010, compared to Brazil’s 0.723.

Primary sector

Production of rice, cassava, and sugarcane
Product	Harvested area (Hectares)	Production (Tons)
Rice	900	5 940
Cassava	150	1 950
Sugarcane	50	750

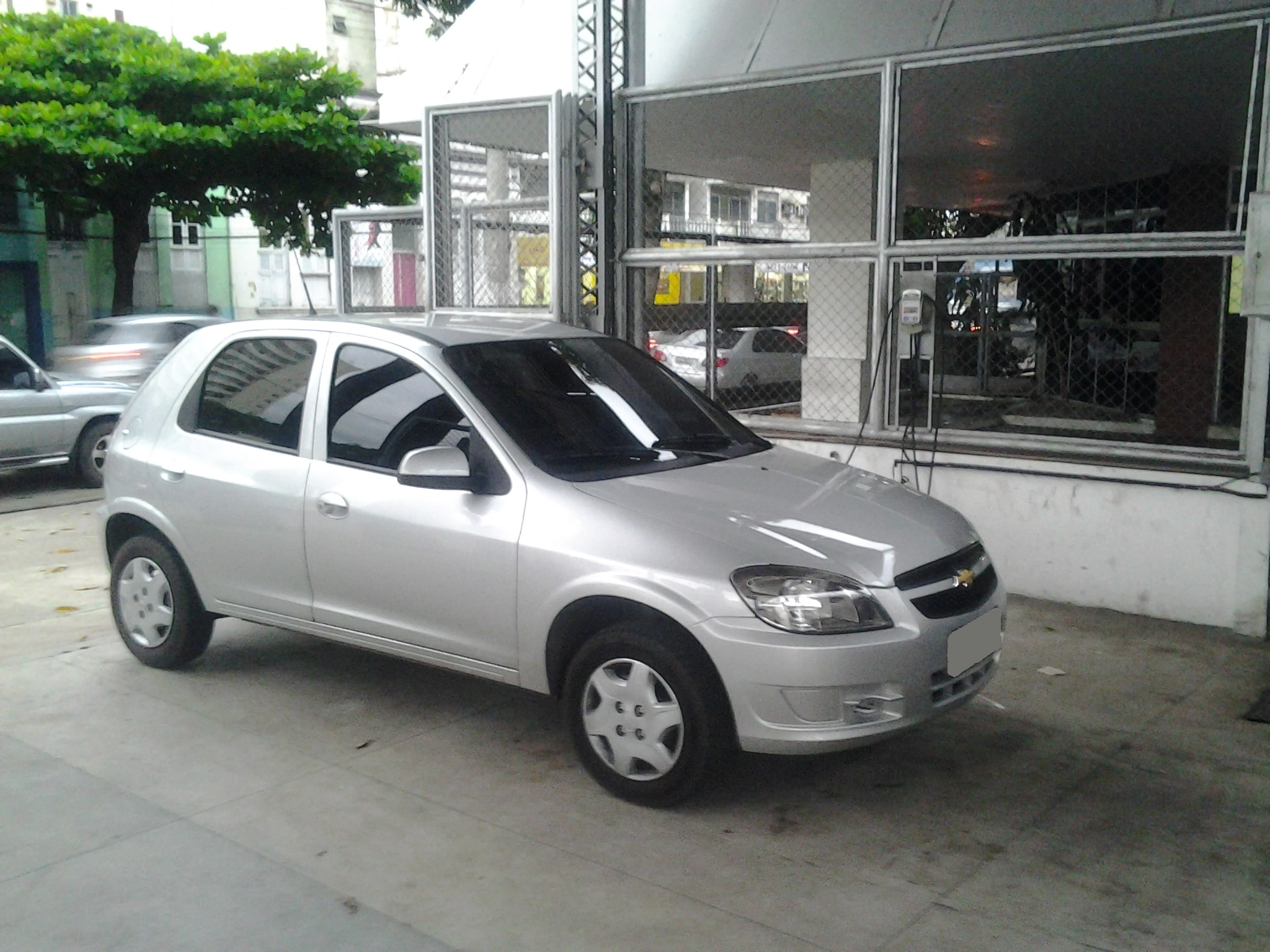
The Chevrolet Celta is an economy car produced by General Motors in Gravataí.

Agriculture is the least significant sector of Gravataí’s economy. Of the city’s total GDP, 15,279 thousand reais is the gross value added by agriculture. According to the IBGE, in 2009, the municipality had a livestock population of 18,300 cattle, 2,958 equines, 3,928 pigs, 1,311 buffaloes, 970 goats, 17 donkeys, 33 mules, 588 sheep, 490 rabbits, and 38,460 poultry, including 24,250 hens, 11,760 roosters, broilers, and chicks, as well as 2,450 quails. In 2009, the city produced 2,990 thousand liters of milk from 1,470 cows. It also produced 132,000 dozen chicken eggs, 58,000 dozen quail eggs, 1,940 kilograms of honey, and 349 kilograms of wool from sheep. A total of 294 sheep were sheared. In temporary crops, the main products are rice (5,940 tons), cassava (1,950 tons), and sugarcane (750 tons).

Secondary sector

The industry is currently the most significant sector for the municipality’s economy. 2,371,233 reais of the municipal GDP comes from the gross value added by the industrial sector (secondary sector). A significant portion of these profits originates from the Gravataí Automotive Industrial Complex of General Motors Brazil, established on March 17, 1997, and inaugurated on July 20, 2000. Since then, the municipality has gained national prominence in the sector. The factory currently produces approximately 240,000 vehicles annually, accounting for 40% of GM’s total production in Brazil. The complex occupies a total area of 386 hectares, with 940,000 m² of built area in 2007, and 50 hectares dedicated to environmental preservation.

Tertiary sector

The service sector contributes 2,002,743 reais to the municipal GDP. The tertiary sector is currently the second-largest contributor to Gravataí’s GDP. According to the IBGE, in 2008, the city had 7,489 local units, 7,290 companies and active commercial establishments, and 104,358 workers, with 56,664 total employed personnel and 47,694 salaried employees. Salaries and other remunerations totaled 899,229 reais, with an average monthly salary across the municipality of 3.6 minimum wages.

== Urban infrastructure ==
The municipality has robust infrastructure. In 2000, it had 67,031 housing units, including apartments, houses, and rooms. Of these, 56,444 were owned properties, with 47,645 fully paid (71.08%), 8,799 under acquisition (13.13%), and 5,405 rented (8.06%). 4,178 properties were provided, with 1,132 by employers (1.69%) and 3,046 provided otherwise (4.54%). 1,004 were occupied in other ways (1.50%). The municipality provides treated water, electricity, sewage, urban cleaning, fixed telephony, and mobile telephony. In 2000, 73.73% of households were served by the general water supply network; 96.53% of households had garbage collected by cleaning services; and 33.88% of residences had access to general sewage or stormwater networks.

=== Healthcare ===
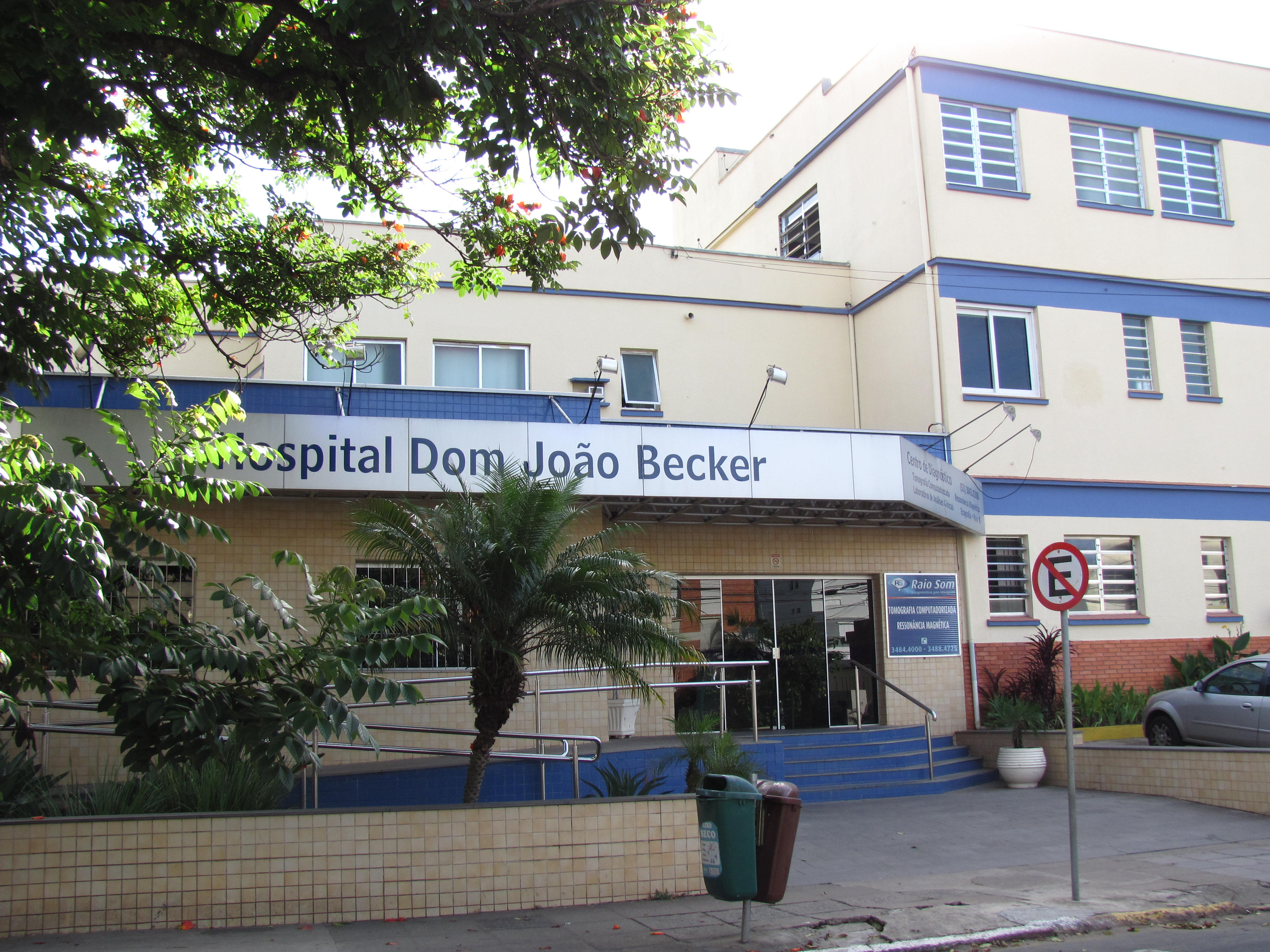
Dom João Becker Hospital

In 2009, the municipality had 71 health facilities, including hospitals, emergency departments, health centers, and dentistry services, with 37 private and 34 public facilities. These provided 233 beds for hospitalization, all in private facilities. As of April 2010, there were 2,539 healthcare professionals. The city has only one general hospital, which is philanthropic. Gravataí belongs to the Porto Alegre CRS 01 Health Region. In 2009, there were 85,652 women of childbearing age (10 to 49 years). The Human Development Index (HDI) for longevity in Gravataí is 0.862, with a life expectancy of 73.59 years.

The Dom João Becker Hospital, managed by the Coração de Maria Nucleus, is the only facility in the city capable of performing complex medical procedures. It offers 189 beds through the Unified Health System (SUS) and provides emergency services, hospitalization, diagnostic facilities (laboratory tests, X-rays, ultrasound, CT scans, MRI, and elective surgeries), as well as on-call pediatric, clinical, surgical, obstetric, anesthesiology, and intensive care specialists operating in the Intensive Care Unit (ICU).

=== Education ===
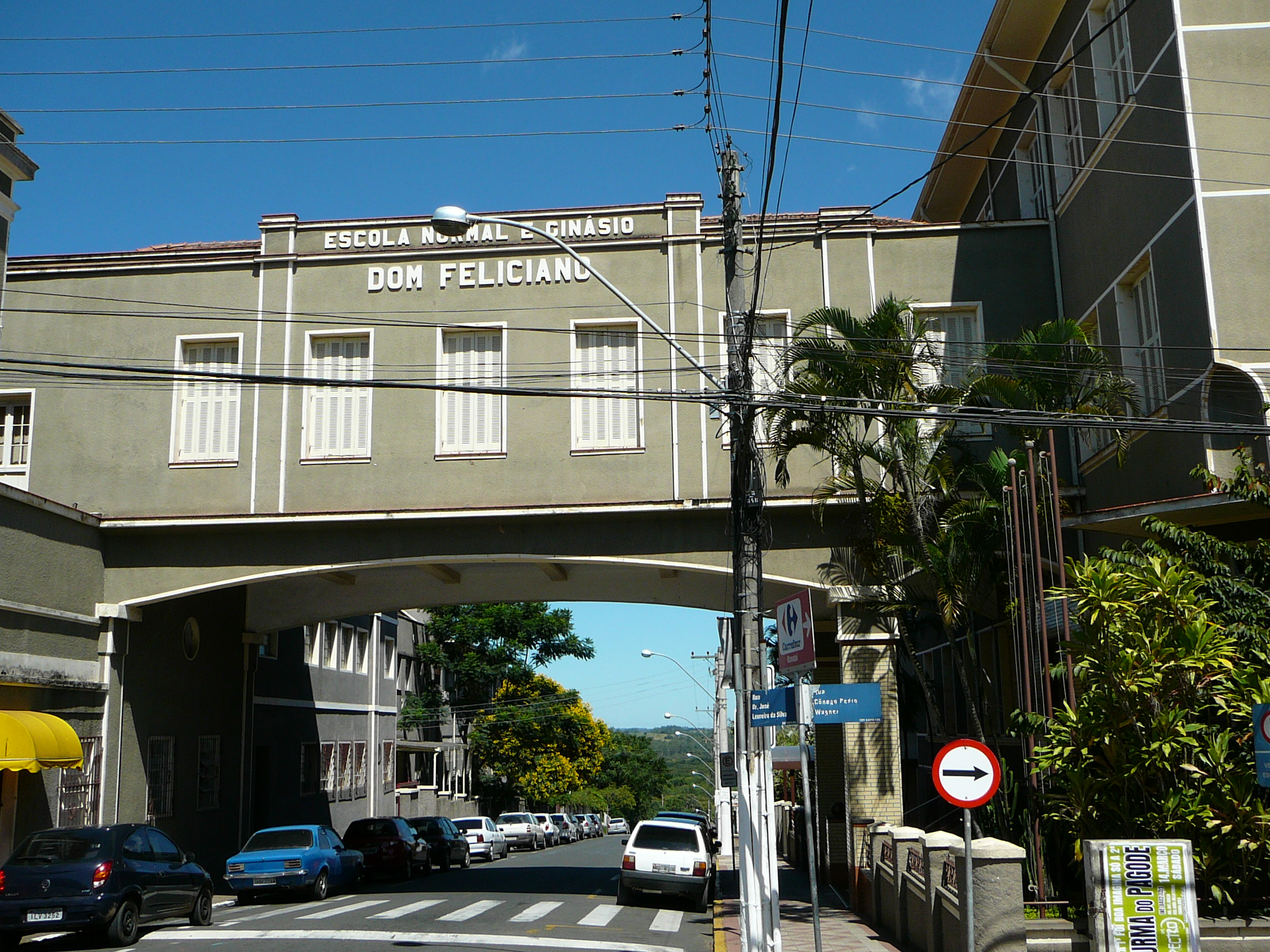
View of Colégio Dom Feliciano, a private school in the city

The municipality has schools in all its regions. The rural area population has easy access to schools in nearby urban neighborhoods due to the high urbanization rate. The average Basic Education Development Index (IDEB) among Gravataí’s public schools in 2009 was 4.1, close to the national average of 4.0 for municipal and state schools. In 2009, the municipality had approximately 51,832 enrollments, 2,412 teachers, and 192 schools in both public and private networks. The Human Development Index (HDI) for education was 0.636, compared to Brazil’s 0.849.

According to data from the Anísio Teixeira National Institute for Educational Studies and Research (INEP) and the Ministry of Education (MEC), the illiteracy rate among individuals aged 18 to 24 in 2000 was 1.590%, while the adult literacy rate that year was 94.87% (compared to Brazil’s 84%). The gross school attendance rate in 2000 was 81.930%, compared to the national rate of 81.89%. A total of 4,124 inhabitants had less than one year of schooling or no formal education. In 2010, 539 students attended special education programs, and 223 children were enrolled in daycare centers. A total of 430 elementary school students attended full-time classes.

Education in Gravataí by numbers
Level	Enrollments	Teachers	Schools (Total)
Primary education	34,882	1,611	99
Secondary education	8,870	536	27

=== Security and crime ===
As in most medium and large Brazilian municipalities, crime is a challenge in Gravataí. In 2008, the homicide rate was 23.3 per 100,000 inhabitants, ranking 27th in the state and 729th nationally. The suicide rate that year was 4.1 per 100,000 inhabitants, ranking 154th in the state and 1450th nationally. The traffic accident mortality rate was 7.5 per 100,000 inhabitants, placing it 142nd in the state and 2296th nationally.

Until the early 2000s, crime rates in Gravataí were significantly lower than those in other cities of the Greater Porto Alegre Metropolitan Area (RMPA). After the mid-2000s, the city surpassed the threshold of 10 homicides per 100,000 inhabitants, which, according to the WHO, marks the onset of endemic violence. However, despite the rise in violence, Gravataí's homicide rate remains lower than that of Porto Alegre and the other three largest cities in the RMPA; in 2015, the rate was 28.9 homicides per 100,000 inhabitants in Gravataí compared to 40.3 in the capital.

Total number of victims of intentional homicide per year in Gravataí.

In Gravataí, the Civil Police operates two regular police stations and one Rapid Response Police Station (DPPA) for arrests and immediate processing. The Military Brigade is represented by the 17th Military Police Battalion.

== Services and communications ==
Water supply in the city is managed by the Companhia Riograndense de Saneamento (CORSAN), which serves 98% of the urban area, although only 21.9% of households have access to sewage collection and treatment services. The Rio Grande Energia (RGE) is responsible for the city's electricity supply, with public lighting available throughout the urban area and 90% of households (including those in rural areas). The city also has access to dial-up and broadband (ADSL) internet services provided by various free and paid internet service providers. Mobile phone services are offered by multiple operators. Gravataí's area code (DDD) is 051, and its Postal Code (CEP) ranges from 94000-001 to 94329-999. On January 8, 2009, the municipality began offering number portability, along with other cities sharing the same DDD.

Several television channels are available in the VHF and UHF bands. Since November 5, 2009, the city has had access to digital television signals, received through RBS TV (Rede Brasil Sul de Televisão). Gravataí also has several newspapers in circulation, including the Jornal de Gravataí, which has been published since March 22, 2005, and the Correio de Gravataí. Major radio stations include Rádio Metrópole and Rádio Cultura do Valle 105.5 FM.

== Transportation ==
In 2009, the municipal vehicle fleet consisted of 86,375 vehicles, including 62,162 cars, 13,859 motorcycles, 3,823 pickup trucks, 2,345 mopeds, 2,774 trucks, 422 minibuses, 489 buses, 376 tractor-trucks, and 126 wheeled tractors. The city's duplicated and paved avenues, along with numerous traffic lights, facilitate traffic flow, but the rapid increase in the number of vehicles during the first decade of the 21st century has led to increasingly slow traffic, particularly in the municipal seat. Additionally, finding parking spaces in the city's commercial center has become challenging, causing some losses to local commerce. The city also has a public transportation system managed by the Municipal Secretariat of Traffic and Transportation of Gravataí (SMTT). This municipal agency is responsible for regulating the city's transportation and traffic systems, managing public transportation, overseeing traffic flow, and, through its traffic agents, issuing citations to drivers who commit traffic violations.

Due to the scarcity of rivers, Gravataí has little tradition of waterway transportation. The city has no airports within its territory, but the Salgado Filho International Airport in Porto Alegre is approximately 20 km from the city center. Gravataí also has a bus terminal located in Vera Cruz. The city is served by the RS-118 (connecting to Sapucaia do Sul and the Itapuã district in Viamão), the RS-020 (to São José dos Ausentes), and the RS-030 (to Tramandaí). The BR-290 (Osvaldo Aranha Highway) is the primary link between Gravataí, the Porto Alegre Metropolitan Area, and the state coast in Osório; the section connecting the metropolitan area to the coast is known as the Freeway. It also connects the RMPA to Uruguaiana, on the border with Argentina.

== Culture ==
The Gravataí Municipal Secretariat of Culture, Sports, and Leisure (SMCEL) oversees the city's cultural sector, aiming to plan and implement cultural policies through programs, projects, and activities that promote cultural development. As part of the municipality's indirect public administration, it enjoys administrative and financial autonomy, supported by budgetary allocations, its own assets, revenue application, and the ability to sign contracts and agreements with other institutions.

=== Arts and crafts ===
In Gravataí's theatrical scene, the services provided by the Gravataí branch of the Serviço Social do Comércio (SESC Vale do Gravataí) stand out. The institution features a multipurpose room for 120 people, a library with over 4,000 literary works and technical reference books, a senior citizens' club, and a theater hall with a capacity of 779 people. The SESC organizes various cultural activities annually, including theater productions, film screenings, and musical performances. The municipal government also organizes notable artistic events, such as the Municipal Culture Conference in March and the Municipal Reading Week in October.

A prominent entity in the city's artistic scene is the SCB Acadêmicos de Gravataí, a samba school founded in 1961 that currently represents Gravataí in the Porto Alegre Carnival. It is the municipality's leading samba school. Since 2007, the school has been part of Porto Alegre's "Special Group," which includes the ten best samba schools in the capital's parades.

Handicraft is one of the most spontaneous forms of cultural expression in Gravataí. Throughout the municipality, unique artisanal products are crafted using regional raw materials and inspired by local culture and lifestyles. Groups such as the Casa do Artesanato de Gravataí bring together various local artisans, providing spaces for the creation, exhibition, and sale of handmade products. These items are typically sold at fairs, exhibitions, or shops dedicated to crafts.

=== Tourism and events ===
Gravataí boasts several tourist attractions, including the Nossa Senhora dos Anjos Matrix Church, whose construction began in 1772 and was built in the Portuguese Baroque style; the Dom Feliciano College, the municipality's first private school, currently maintained by the Sisters of the Immaculate Heart of Mary, known for its architecture featuring an arch connecting the school buildings over José Loureiro da Silva Avenue; CTG Aldeia dos Anjos, which has won the ENART championship 10 times; the City Hall Building, the city hall's headquarters, constructed in an eclectic style with neoclassical and modern characteristics, acquired in 1894 for the municipal administration and renovated in 1996; the Santa Cruz Chapel, built by indigenous people to house a cross and serve as a place of worship and prayer for the early Gravataí settlers, which was in ruins by 1909 but rebuilt with community donations and completed in 1944; the Agostinho Martha Municipal Museum, whose collection tells the colonial history of the Gravataí River Valley, highlighting a sugarcane mill, a handloom, and the entire artisanal weaving complex, as well as a room with furniture from the Azores, and housing the Municipal Historical Archive; the Fonseca Manor, known since 1877, featuring characteristics of Portuguese colonial architecture brought by Azorean settlers; and the Bina Manor, built in the Portuguese style in 1882, part of a 40-hectare rural property called Sítio do Sobrado, whose basement once housed a slave camp with a significant number of enslaved people. This site now serves as the headquarters of the Municipal Environmental Foundation.

To promote local socioeconomic development, the Gravataí municipal government, sometimes in partnership with local companies, invests in festivals and events. These events often attract visitors from other cities, requiring improved municipal infrastructure and encouraging the professionalization of the sector, which benefits not only tourists but also the entire local population. Activities take place throughout the year. The city's Official Events Calendar, published annually by the municipal government, includes: the Feast of Our Lady of Navigators, held on February 2; the Gravataí Carnival, in February or March; the Passion of Christ, in March or April; the Bromeliad Festival, in April; Corpus Christi celebrations, in May or June; the Homeland Week and Civic Parade, in September; the Farroupilha Week, in September; and the Black Consciousness Week in the Municipality, in November.

=== Sports ===
As in much of Brazil, the most popular sport in Gravataí is football. The city is home to several clubs, including the Clube Esportivo Alvi-Rubro, the oldest in the municipality, founded on May 7, 1933; the América Futebol Clube, established in 1950; and the Cerâmica Atlético Clube, founded on April 19, 1950. The municipality's main football stadium is the Antônio Vieira Ramos Stadium, inaugurated on March 2, 2008, and home to the Cerâmica Atlético Clube.

In addition to the Gravataí City Football Championship, a significant municipal football competition, the city organizes several other annual sporting events involving various disciplines. These include: the Municipal Stage of the Gaucho Summer Sports Circuit, in February; the Gravataí School Games, in March; the Gravataí International Cycling Tour, in April; the Hachiman Karate Cup and the Aldeião Municipal Futsal Cup, in May; the Taekwondo Tournament, the Gravataí Table Tennis Cup, and the South Gravataí Canoeing Cup, in June; the Municipal Women's Futsal Championship, in July; the Municipal Men's/Women's Volleyball Championship, in September; and the Bromeliad City Mountain Bike Event, in October.

=== Holidays ===
Gravataí observes two municipal holidays, eight national holidays, and three optional holidays. The municipal holidays are Corpus Christi, celebrated on the Thursday following the Sunday of the Holy Trinity, and the day of Our Lady of the Angels, the city's patron saint, on August 2. According to Federal Law No. 9,093, enacted on September 12, 1995, municipalities may have up to four municipal holidays, including Good Friday.

== See also ==
- List of municipalities in Rio Grande do Sul
