= Pasipha carajaensis =

Scientific classification
- Kingdom: Animalia
- Phylum: Platyhelminthes
- Order: Tricladida
- Family: Geoplanidae
- Genus: Pasipha
- Species: P. carajaensis

Binomial name
- Pasipha carajaensis Amaral & Leal-Zanchet, 2019

Species of flatworm

Pasipha carajaensis is a species of land planarian belonging to the subfamily Geoplaninae. It is found within Brazil.

== Description ==
Pasipha carajaensis has an elongate body with parallel margins, reaching up to about 24 mm in length. The dorsum is a pale grey color with a yellowish median band, which is bordered by two dark paramedian stripes. The ventral side of the body is a pale grey color.

Additionally, in regards to internal anatomy, certain features in combination distinguish it from other members of the genus. P. carajaensis lacks a glandular margin. The pharynx is collar-form in shape. The prostatic vesicle is outside of the penis bulb, with the proximal portion being short and ovoid, and the distal portion being globose. The female atrium is oval-elongate in shape and is lined by a pseudostratified epithelium.

== Etymology ==
The specific epithet of carajaensis is derived from the species' type locality, described as the "speleological province" of Carajás, which is referring to the Carajás mineral province encompassing the Carajás National Forest and Carajás Mountains. The location of the holotype is within this province, in a cave, and is in close proximity to the national forest.

== Distribution ==
P. carajaensis is only known to be found in caves in the Carajás speleological province, just outside of the municipality of Curionópolis, Pará, Brazil.
