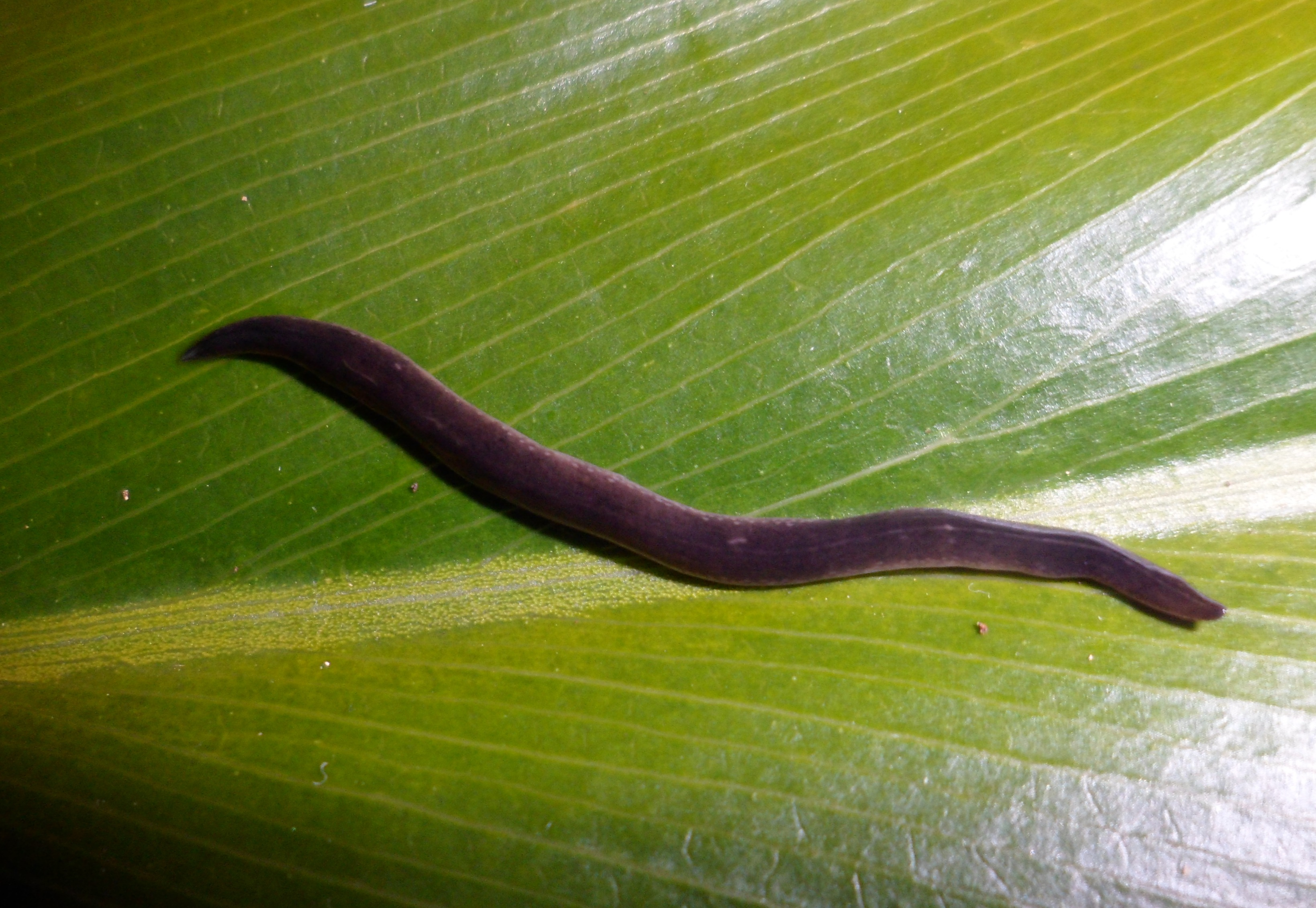

Scientific classification
- Kingdom: Animalia
- Phylum: Platyhelminthes
- Order: Tricladida
- Family: Geoplanidae
- Genus: Pasipha
- Species: P. brevilineata

Binomial name
- Pasipha brevilineata Leal-Zanchet, Rossi & Alvarenga, 2012

= Pasipha brevilineata =

Species of flatworm

Pasipha brevilineata is a species of land planarian belonging to the subfamily Geoplaninae. It is found within Brazil.

== Description ==
Pasipha brevilineata has an elongate body with parallel margins, reaching up to 55 mm in length. The dorsum ranges from dark brown to black in color, with a thin median stripe ranging from pale yellow to greyish in color. Near the posterior tip, the median stripe widens and becomes whiter. Though not visible to the naked eye, the pale yellow or greyish color is present on the anterior tip and body margins as well, in addition to being irregularly spotted across the dorsum. The ventral side of the body is greyish, with a dark grey anterior tip.

== Etymology ==
The specific epithet is derived from the Latin words brevis and lineata, literally meaning "narrow line", in reference to the thin midline running down the species' dorsum.

== Distribution ==
P. brevilineata is only known to be found in the state of Rio Grande do Sul, Brazil, having been found in the municipality of São Francisco de Paula.
