= Pasipha chimbeva =

Scientific classification
- Kingdom: Animalia
- Phylum: Platyhelminthes
- Order: Tricladida
- Family: Geoplanidae
- Genus: Pasipha
- Species: P. chimbeva

Binomial name
- Pasipha chimbeva (Froehlich, 1954) Ogren & Kawakatsu, 1990

Species of flatworm

Pasipha chimbeva is a species of land planarian belonging to the subfamily Geoplaninae. It is found within Brazil.

== Description ==
Pasipha chimbeva, in movement, can reach up to around 7 cm in length. The body in motion is narrow, tapering towards the anterior. The margins are parallel. The dorsum is an orange color, with white unpigmented spots. The tips of the body are brown in color. There are sparse brown speckles along the back as well. The ventral side of the body is a light orange.

== Etymology ==
The specific epithet of chimbeva is taken from the Tupi language words tim and mbé, literally meaning "flattened snout", in reference to the shape of the anterior tip of the body.
