= Cachoeirinha =

Municipality of Rio Grande do Sul, Brazil

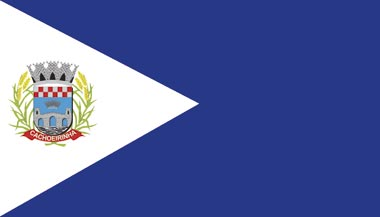
- Flag Coat of arms
- Motto: A New City
- Geographical divisions of Rio Grande do Sul state. Cachoeirinha is highlighted in red.

- Location in Brazil
- Coordinates: 29°57′03″S 51°05′38″W
- Country: Brazil
- Region: Sul
- State: Rio Grande do Sul
- Founded: 15 May 1966

Government
  - Mayor: Cristian Wasem Rosa (MDB)

Area
  - Total: 43.9 km^{2} (16.9 sq mi)
- Elevation: 17 m (56 ft)

Population (2022 Census)
  - Total: 136,258
  - Estimate (2025): 141,503
  - Density: 3,100/km^{2} (8,040/sq mi)
- Time zone: UTC−3 (BRT)
- CEP: 94900-000
- Area code: (+55) 51
- Website: Official website

Cachoeirinha (lit. "Little Waterfall") is a city in the Brazilian state of Rio Grande do Sul. Cachoeirinha is an alternative for the people who want to be near Porto Alegre (capital of Rio Grande do Sul). The city is situated at a strategic point in Rio Grande do Sul state. The city shares borders with Porto Alegre, Canoas, Esteio, Sapucaia do Sul, Gravataí and Alvorada. The city holiday is on May 15, the date on which the city declared its emancipation.

Cachoeirinha is known locally for having a large industrial district, for being the new home of Esporte Clube Cruzeiro, a traditional football team from Rio Grande do Sul, and for housing the Rice Experimental Station of the Rio Grande do Sul Rice Institute (IRGA).

== Municipal policy ==
The Executive of the Municipality of Cachoeirinha is represented by the mayor and his office of Secretary, following the model proposed by the Federal Constitution. Legislative Power is represented by the City Council, composed of 17 councilors elected to office for four years. The House vote enacts laws for the administration and the Executive, especially the municipal budget.

== Population ==
One of Cachoeirinha's gaucho municipalities had higher population growth in the 1970s. As of 2022 Census, the city has 136,258 inhabitants and 43.9 square kilometers of land area.

== Traditions ==
Traditions of the gaucho are celebrated by the Cachoeirinha Center Traditions. Rancho da Saudade holds popular events. The Creole round, held annually in the city, received the recognition of the Government of the State of Rio Grande do Sul, and is included in the official calendar. Rodeos held in Cachoeirinha attract people from various cities of Brazil.

== Education ==
The city has 37 public schools and 9 private at the elementary level and one college.

== See also ==
- List of municipalities in Rio Grande do Sul
