= Araricá =

Municipality of Rio Grande do Sul, Brazil

- Municipality
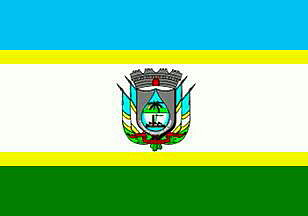
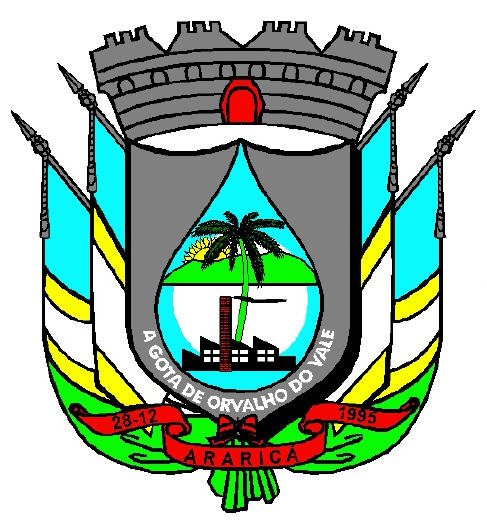
- Flag Coat of arms

- Location within Rio Grande do Sul

- Araricá within the map of Brazil
- Coordinates: 29.615998°S 50.927989°W
- Country: Brazil
- State: Rio Grande do Sul

Population (2020)
  - Total: 5,771
- Time zone: UTC−3 (BRT)

Araricá (Portuguese: [a.ɾa.ɾiˈka]) is a municipality in Rio Grande do Sul, Brazil. The town was incorporated from Sapiranga in 1996.

== See also ==
- List of municipalities in Rio Grande do Sul
