= Expointer =

Brazilian agricultural show

Expointer is an agricultural show with national importance in Brazil that occurs every year in the Parque de Exposições Assis Brasil in the city of Esteio, in the metropolitan area of Porto Alegre in the Brazilian state of Rio Grande do Sul.

It is considered the largest livestock show in Latin America. Brazilian politician Raul Jungmann described the show as "a symbol of gaucho pride".

The first edition occurred on February 24, 1901, in Porto Alegre.

In 1999, Expointer was at the centre of a political dispute between state governor Olívio Dutra and landowners over land reform. After the state landowner's association threatened to boycott the 99th edition of the fair in 2000, the Dutra government conceded a 30-day suspension of land audits and a new commission to examine the state's productivity indices to end the boycott threat.

In 2004 the fair received a record public of 720 thousand people.

No Expointer was held from 1915-18, 1940-45 nor 2021.
