= Esteio =

Municipality of Rio Grande do Sul, Brazil

City of Esteio
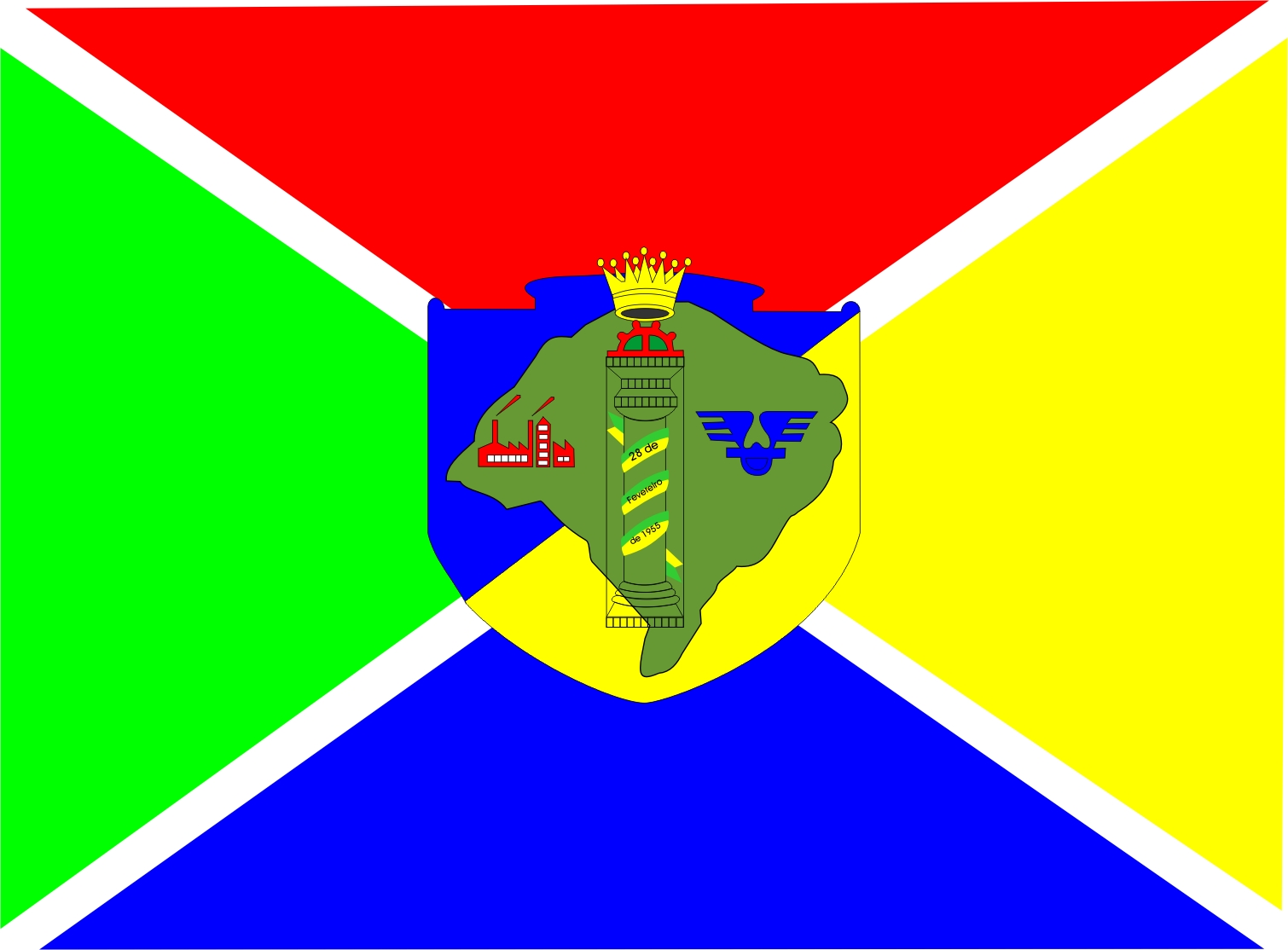
- Flag Coat of arms

- Location in Rio Grande do Sul and Brazil
- Coordinates: 29°51′39″S 51°10′44″W
- Country: Brazil
- Region: Sul
- State: Rio Grande do Sul
- Founded: December 15, 1954

Government
  - Mayor: Leonardo Duarte Pascoal (PP)

Area
  - Total: 27.543 km^{2} (10.634 sq mi)
- Elevation: 11 m (36 ft)

Population (2020)
  - Total: 83,279
  - Density: 2,928.84/km^{2} (7,585.7/sq mi)
- Time zone: UTC−3 (BRT)
- HDI (2000): 0.842 – high
- Website: esteio.rs.gov.br

Esteio is a municipality situated in the Brazilian state of Rio Grande do Sul, in the metropolitan region of Porto Alegre, the state capital. About 9.3 miles from Porto Alegre, and neighboring Canoas and Sapucaia do Sul, it has about 83,000 inhabitants.

Esteio is known for being the city where the Expointer takes place. Expointer is one of the most important agriculture/farming fairs of South America.

== See also ==
- List of municipalities in Rio Grande do Sul
