= Alvorada =

Municipality of Rio Grande do Sul, Brazil

City of Alvorada
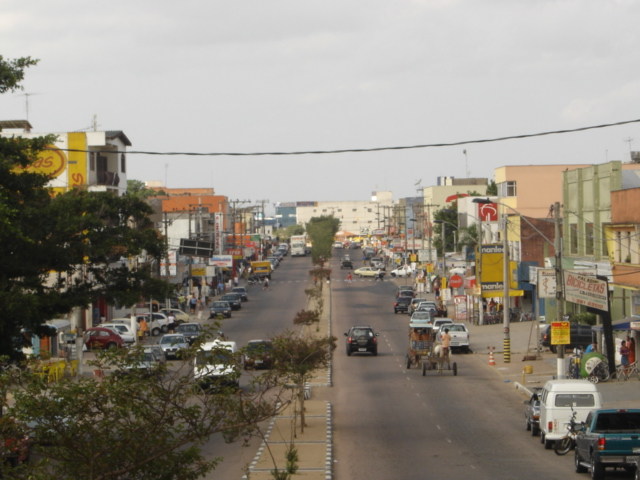

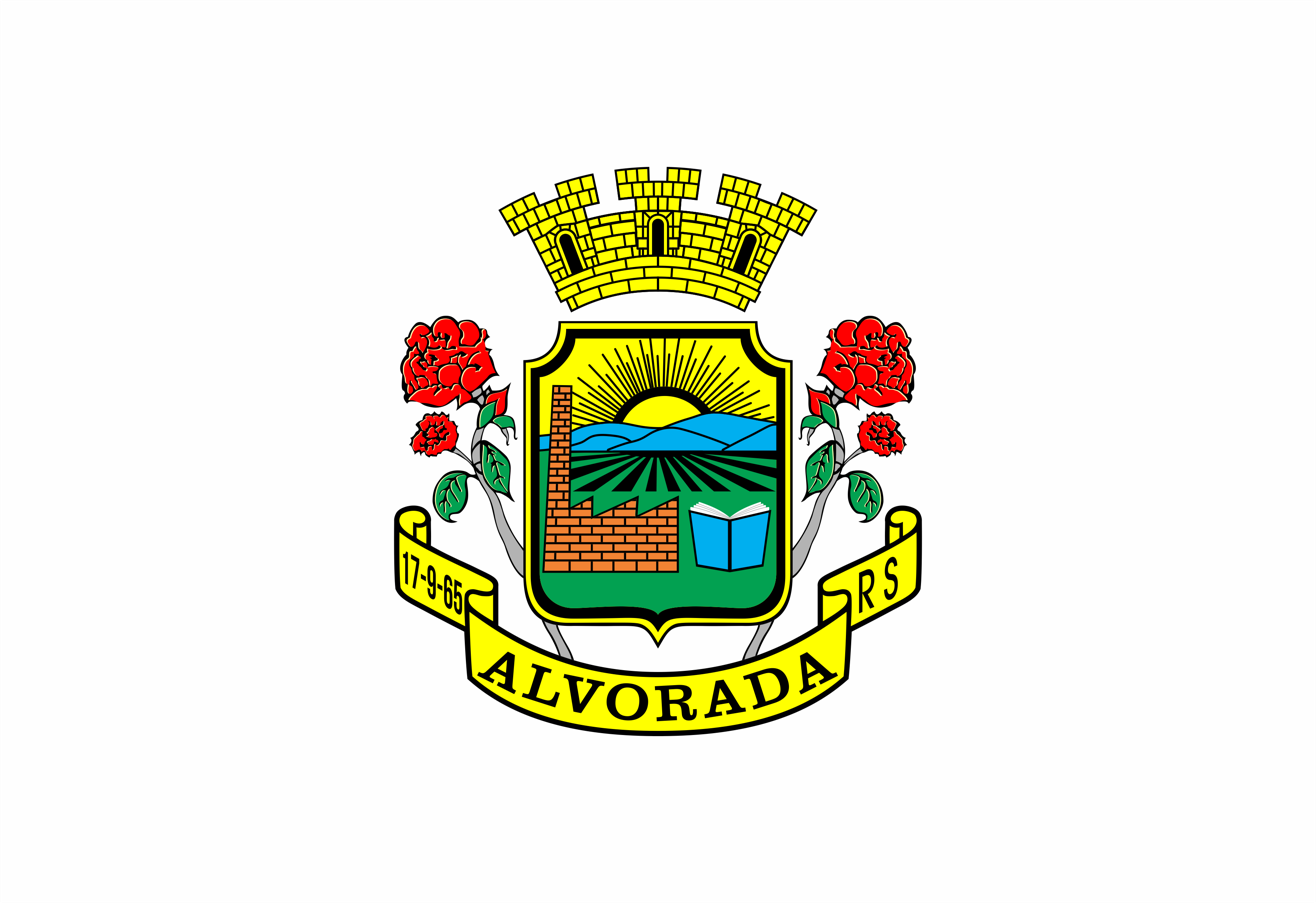
- Flag Coat of arms
- Nickname: Capital of Solidarity
- Location in Rio Grande do Sul, Brazil
- Coordinates: 29°59′24″S 51°05′02″W
- Country: Brazil
- Region: South
- State: Rio Grande do Sul
- Founded: 1965

Government
  - Mayor: Jose Arno Appolo do Amaral (MDB)

Area
  - Total: 70.811 km^{2} (27.340 sq mi)
- Elevation: 17 m (56 ft)

Population (2022 Brazilian Census)
  - Total: 187,315
  - Estimate (2025): 194,062
  - Density: 2,645.3/km^{2} (6,851.2/sq mi)
- Time zone: UTC−3 (BRT)
- Postal code: 94810
- Area code: (+55) 51
- Website: alvorada.rs.gov.br (in Portuguese)

Alvorada (Portuguese: [aw.voˈɾa.dɐ], lit. 'dawn') is a municipality in the state of Rio Grande do Sul, in the south of Brazil, adjacent to the capital of the state, Porto Alegre. The city is also known as "The Capital of Solidarity." Alvorada is primarily a bedroom community with most workers commuting to adjacent cities such as Porto Alegre to work. Its name means "the awakening" or "the sunrise".

Although improvements have been made, the city suffers from heavy crime and squatting. The largest of these slums or favelas is the dangerous Umbu subdivision. Drug and arms trafficking are punctuated by periodic violence.

== Geography ==
Alvorada is bordered by the municipalities of Porto Alegre by west, Viamão by south, Gravataí by east and Cachoeirinha by north.

The municipality's growth has occurred from Avenida Presidente Getúlio Vargas (President Getúlio Vargas Avenue), the main central thoroughfare of the city.

The municipality's economy is based mainly on commerce and industry. However, Alvorada is considered a commuter town, since most of Alvorada population works in the municipality of Porto Alegre.

== See also ==
- List of municipalities in Rio Grande do Sul
