= 2024 Rio Grande do Sul floods =

2024 floods in southern Brazil

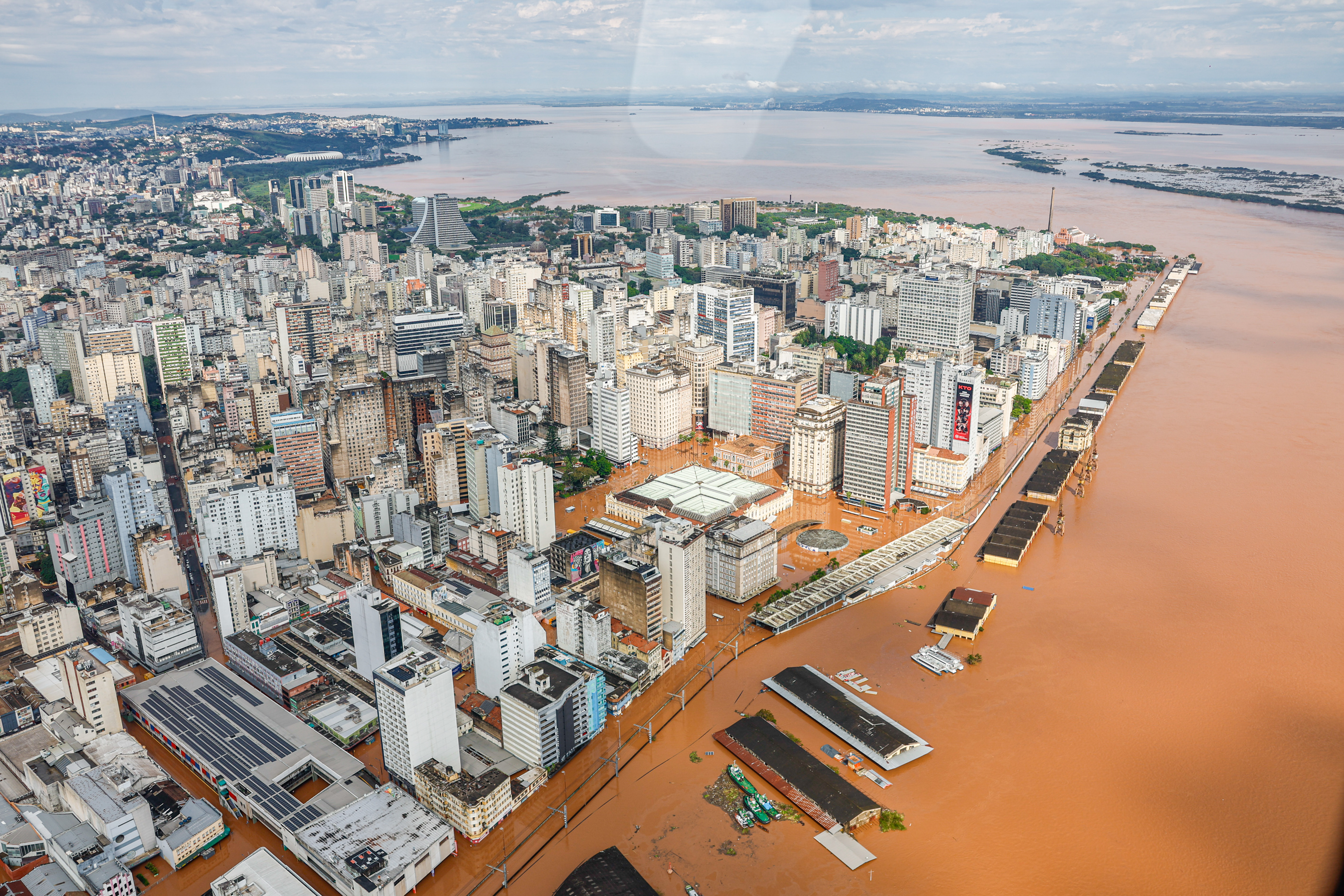
- Porto Alegre during the floods
- Date: 29 April 2024 – May 2024
- Location: Rio Grande do Sul; Santa Catarina; Northern Uruguay; Northeastern Argentina
- Cause: Heavy rains and storms
- Deaths: 181
- Injuries: 806+
- Missing: 61
- Property damage: R$19 billion (US$3.7 billion)

The 2024 Rio Grande do Sul floods were severe floods caused by heavy rains and storms that hit the Brazilian state of Rio Grande do Sul, and the adjacent Uruguayan cities of Treinta y Tres, Paysandú, Cerro Largo, and Salto. From 29 April through to May, it resulted in 181 fatalities (as of 7 July 2024), widespread landslides, and a dam collapse. It is considered the country's worst flooding in over 80 years.

The floods marked the fourth such environmental disaster in Brazil within the past 12 months, following similar calamities that killed 75 people in July, September, and November 2023.

== Meteorological history ==
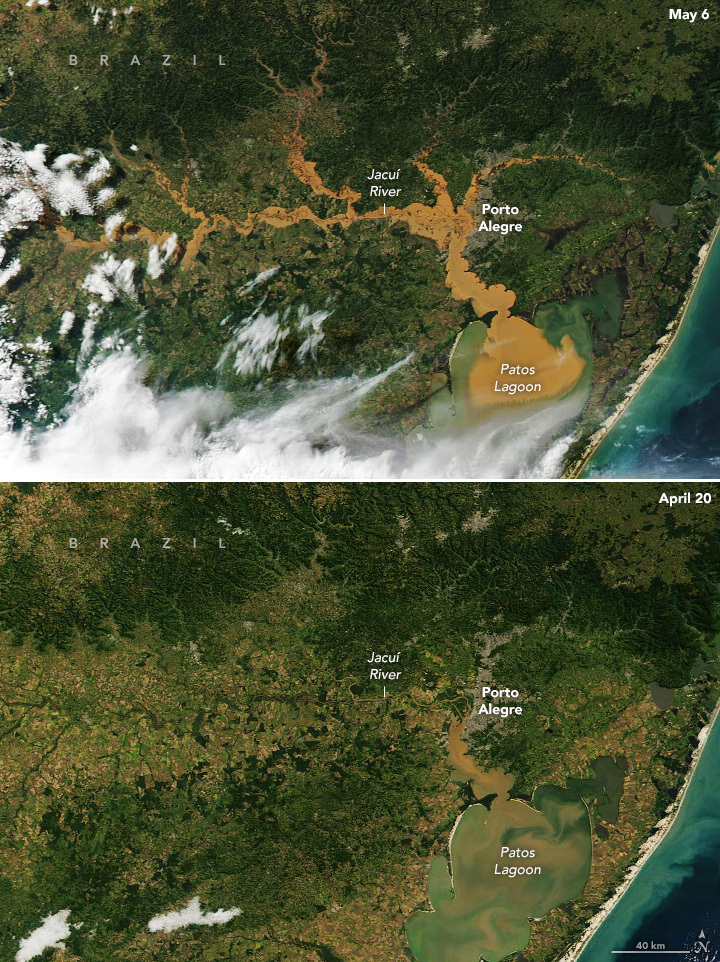
Satellite images of the affected areas on 6 May (top) and 20 April (bottom), during and before the floods

An atmospheric block, caused by a high-pressure system in Centro-Sul, prevented the displacement of typical meteorological systems (such as extratropical cyclones, cold fronts, and troughs) that cause precipitation. In the areas where the anticyclone was active, temperatures were 5 to 10 °C (9.0 to 18.0 °F) higher than the record values recorded by the National Institute of Meteorology (INMET), since areas of instability were confined to the state of Rio Grande do Sul. On 22 April, the Civil Defense of Rio Grande do Sul issued a meteorological alert, later updated, warning of the risk of disruptions due to isolated storms and locally intense rains, which could cause flooding and power cuts. In the following days, the Civil Defense kept issuing alerts, along with forecasts for adverse weather conditions.

Heavy rain and strong winds started hitting the northern part of the state on 28 April; by the following day, they had spread to almost the entire state. Storms occurring between 28 April and 1 May were caused by a cold front associated with a low-pressure area over the sea, while also being influenced by a moisture flow coming from the north of the country. According to an INMET report, rainfall reached over 150 millimetres (5.91 in) in some parts of Rio Grande do Sul in 24 hours on 30 April; they later reported that the average precipitation in the Porto Alegre area in the first twelve days of May could amount up to 333.1 millimetres (13.11 in), almost thrice the average monthly value recorded between 1991 and 2020 (113 millimetres (4.4 in)).

=== Relationship with climate change ===
In 2015, the report "Brazil 2040: scenarios and adaptation alternatives to climate change," commissioned in 2014 by Dilma Rousseff's administration and conducted by several research institutions in the country, already showed the trend of increased rainfall in the South of Brazil due to climate change. The report pointed to an increase of more than 15% in the level of rainfall in the southernmost region of the country. Other climatologists, such as Paulo Artaxo, a member of the Intergovernmental Panel on Climate Change (IPCC), Carlos Nobre, a researcher at the National Institute for Space Research, and Marcio Astrini, executive secretary of the Climate Observatory, also correlated the frequent floods in the South of Brazil with the impacts of global warming in Brazil and the lack of public policies to mitigate these effects.

== Impact ==
=== Victims ===
Map of affected areas due Rio Grande do Sul 2024 floods

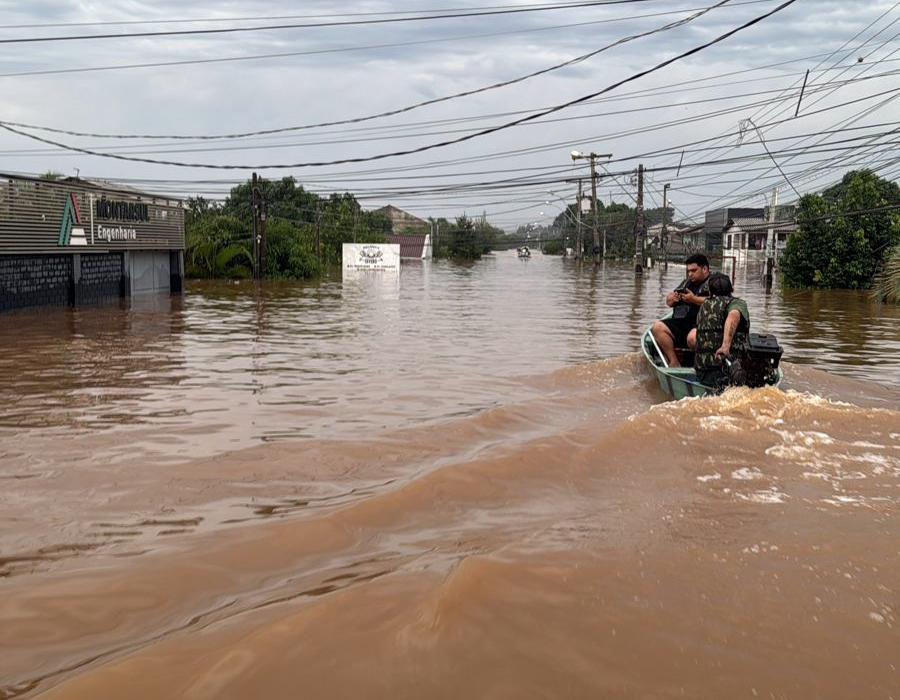
Greater Porto Alegre during the flood

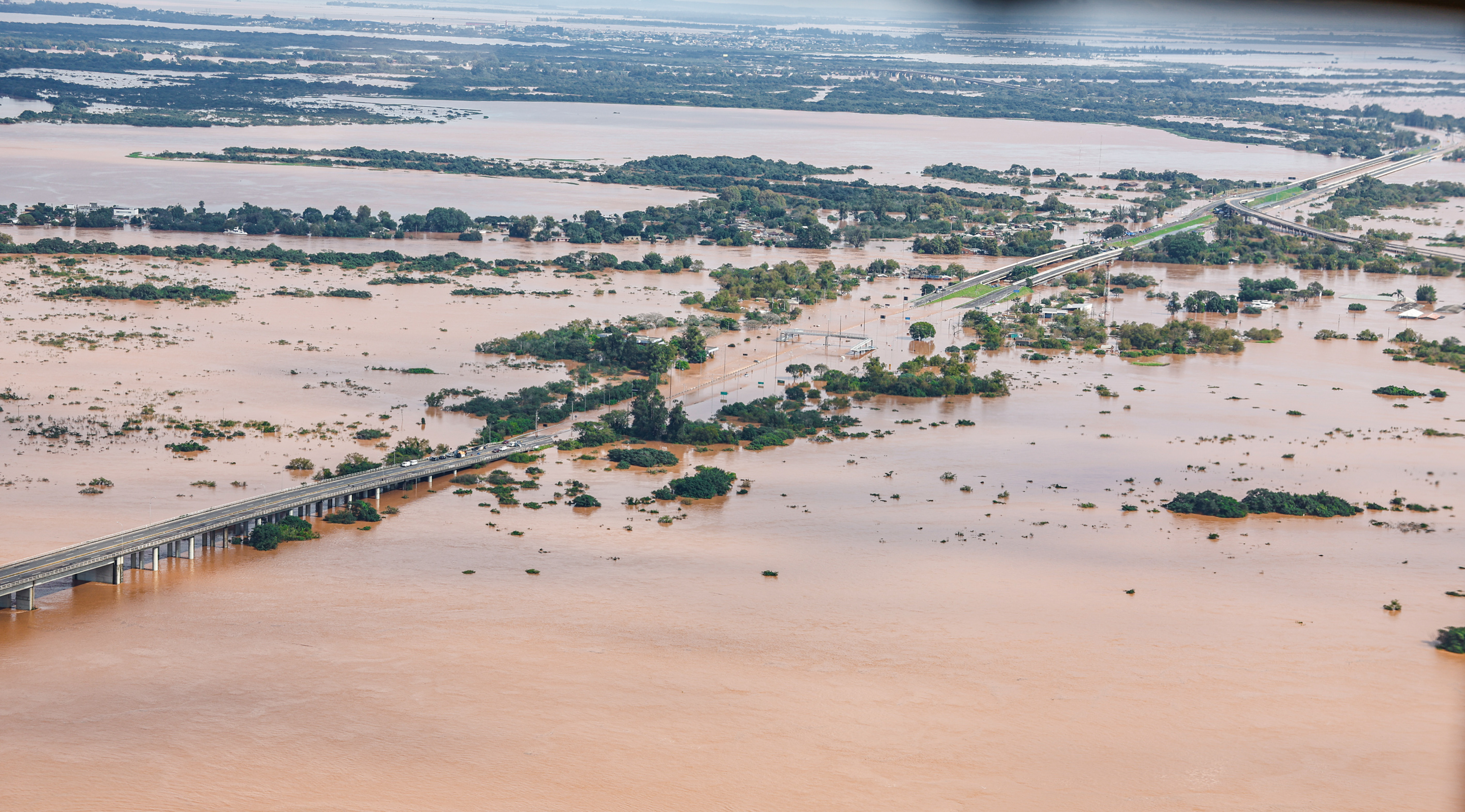
Guaíba Bridge on 5 May 2024 between Eldorado do Sul and Porto Alegre

Across all regions of the state of Rio Grande do Sul, at least 169 people were killed, 806 others were injured, and 56 were left missing in the floods. At least 580,000 others were displaced from their homes, around 68,500 of whom were in shelters. Agence France-Presse (AFP) reported that two more people died in an explosion at a flooded gas station in Porto Alegre, where rescue crews were attempting to refuel their vehicles. The flooding was exacerbated by the partial collapse of the 14 de Julho hydroelectric dam located on the Das Antas River between the municipalities of Cotiporã and Bento Gonçalves, which left at least 30 people killed; four other dams across the state were also considered at risk of collapse. Another victim was reported in the nearby state of Santa Catarina, as a man died in the municipality of Ipira.

=== Other impacts ===
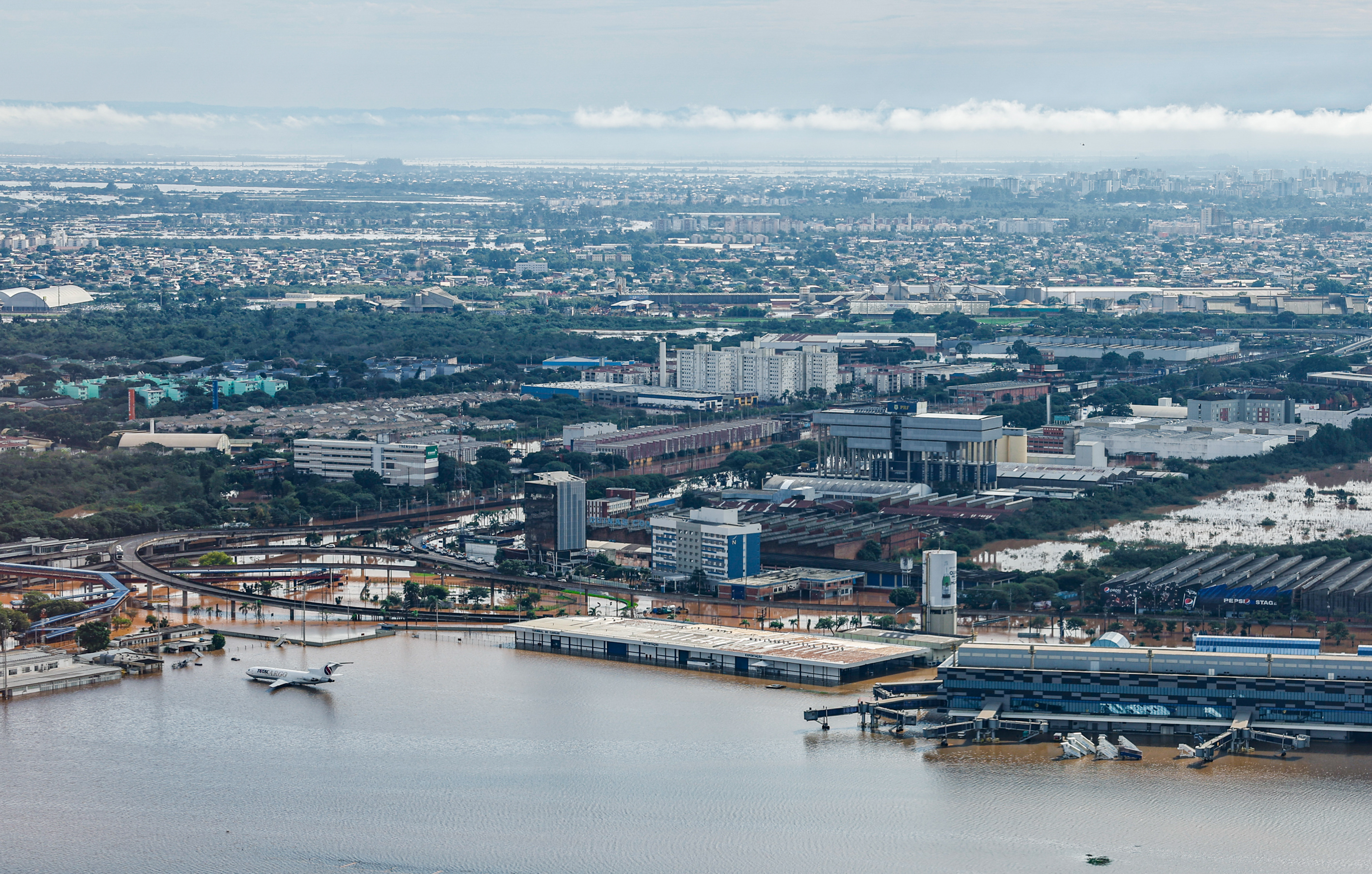
Porto Alegre–Salgado Filho International Airport covered by the flooding

Over 500,000 people were left without power and clean water across Rio Grande do Sul, and flood damage occurred in 431 of the state's 497 municipalities, while many roads and bridges were destroyed and landslides occurred. Communication via internet and telephone services was also cut off by the floods in over 85 municipalities, with all three main providers (TIM, Vivo, and Claro) having their services affected and offering temporarily free Internet access via roaming to their clients.

Entire cities in the Taquari River valley, such as Lajeado, Estrela, Muçum, Cruzeiro do Sul, and Arroio do Meio, were made temporarily inaccessible by the effects of the floods. The banks of the local river in Gravataí were also considered to be at the verge of collapsing, as four of the city's treatment plants had to be closed momentarily.

In Porto Alegre, the Guaíba Lake rose up to 5.31 m (17.4 ft), thus beating the previous record 4.76 m (15.6 ft) set during the 1941 floods, as most areas of the city were flooded, with more than 60 streets becoming completely inaccessible and more than 10 being partially blocked; rescue workers used four-wheel-drive vehicles, boats, and jet skis in order to maneuver through flooded streets in search of stranded and missing people. Eldorado do Sul, a city in the Greater Porto Alegre region, was also affected by the flood. The then mayor, Ernani de Freitas Gonçalves, said that "100% of the town has been affected by this flood" and that all communication was lost with the rescue teams that were dispatched.

Across almost all affected municipalities, classes were suspended, with 386 schools suffering damage and 52 being repurposed as shelters. According to governor Eduardo Leite, the reconstruction costs of affected cities could reach R$19 billion (US$3.7 billion). The flood displaced more than 700 people in Uruguay, and it shut down several rural schools.

Ten aircraft have been damaged, including PR-AJN Embraer EMB-505 Phenom 300, PR-DCL Beechcraft C90GTx King Air, PR-FHT Embraer EMB-500 Phenom 100, PR-SCC Cessna T206H Stationair TC, PR-TTP Boeing 727-2M7(A)(F) Total Linhas Aéreas SA, PS-CNB Cessna 208B Grand Caravan EX Azul, PS-LCA Pilatus PC-24, Piper PA-46-500TP M500, PT-OSW BAe 125-800B, and the museum PP-ANU DC-3 Varig Exposition.

90% of businesses in the state suffered partial or total losses due to the flooding. Surveys conducted by the Confederação Nacional dos Municípios estimated a R$2.7 billion (US$521 million) loss in agriculture, and a R$245.4 million (US$47 million) loss in livestock farming.

At least 141 cases of leptospirosis, a bacterial blood infection that can be transmitted via contaminated standing water, were confirmed across the state following the floods, with at least seven people eventually dying from complications of the disease.

== Aftermath ==
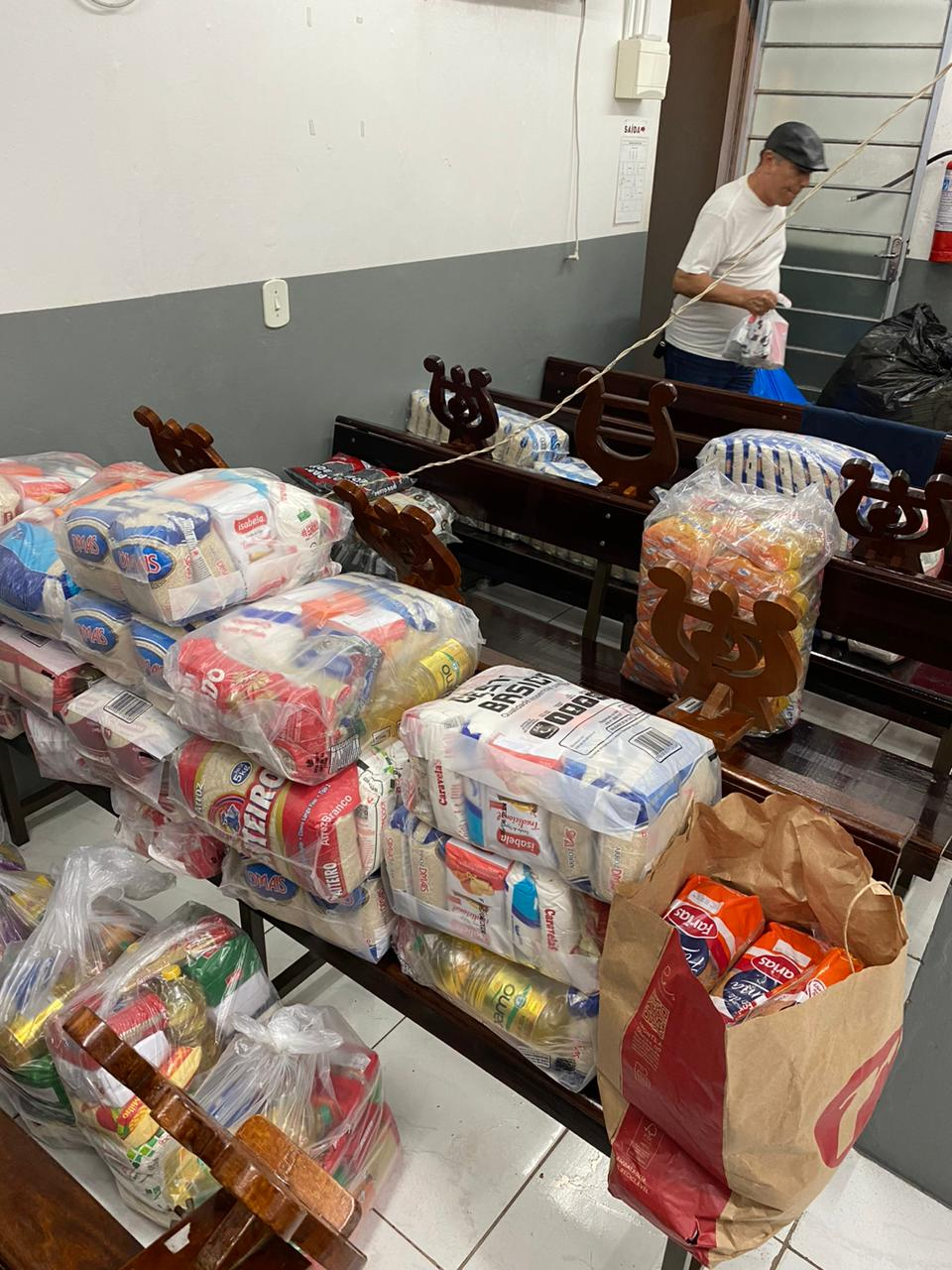
Food storage for victims in Porto Alegre

The floods were considered the worst to hit Brazil in over 80 years, and marked the fourth such environmental disaster in a solar year, as previous floods killed 75 people between July, September, and November 2023.

Climatologist Francisco Eliseu Aquino told AFP that, while the region was already prone to extreme climate events caused by the collision of tropical and polar air masses, these events had "intensified" due to the effects of climate change, stating that the storms were the result of a "disastrous cocktail" of global warming and the El Niño climate phenomenon.

All the main transportation services in Porto Alegre, including the Salgado Filho International Airport, the Metro, and local bus services, suspended their activities for an undetermined period.

On 1 May, the Brazilian Football Confederation announced the postponement of all of the matches across the region throughout that week, including Série A, Copa do Brasil, Brasileirão Feminino, Série C, and Série D matches. Following an official request filed by regional-based clubs Internacional, Grêmio and Juventude, whose stadiums, Federação Gaúcha de Futebol, and training facilities were all temporarily unavailable due to the floods, the CBF postponed the games for a further twenty days on 7 May. When Internacional and Grêmio were competing in the Copa Sudamericana and the Copa Libertadores, respectively, both had two of their group-stage matches postponed by CONMEBOL at the time of the disaster.

=== Reactions and humanitarian efforts ===
In the immediate aftermath of the floods, the governor of Rio Grande do Sul, Eduardo Leite, said that the floods were an "absolutely unprecedented emergency", and "the worst climate disaster" the state had ever witnessed, even more so than the previous year's floods. On 1 May, the local government officially declared a 180-day long state of emergency. On 5 May, it was announced that the government had approved a R$117.7 million (US$21.8 million) worth package aimed to restore the state's infrastructures left damaged by the floods.

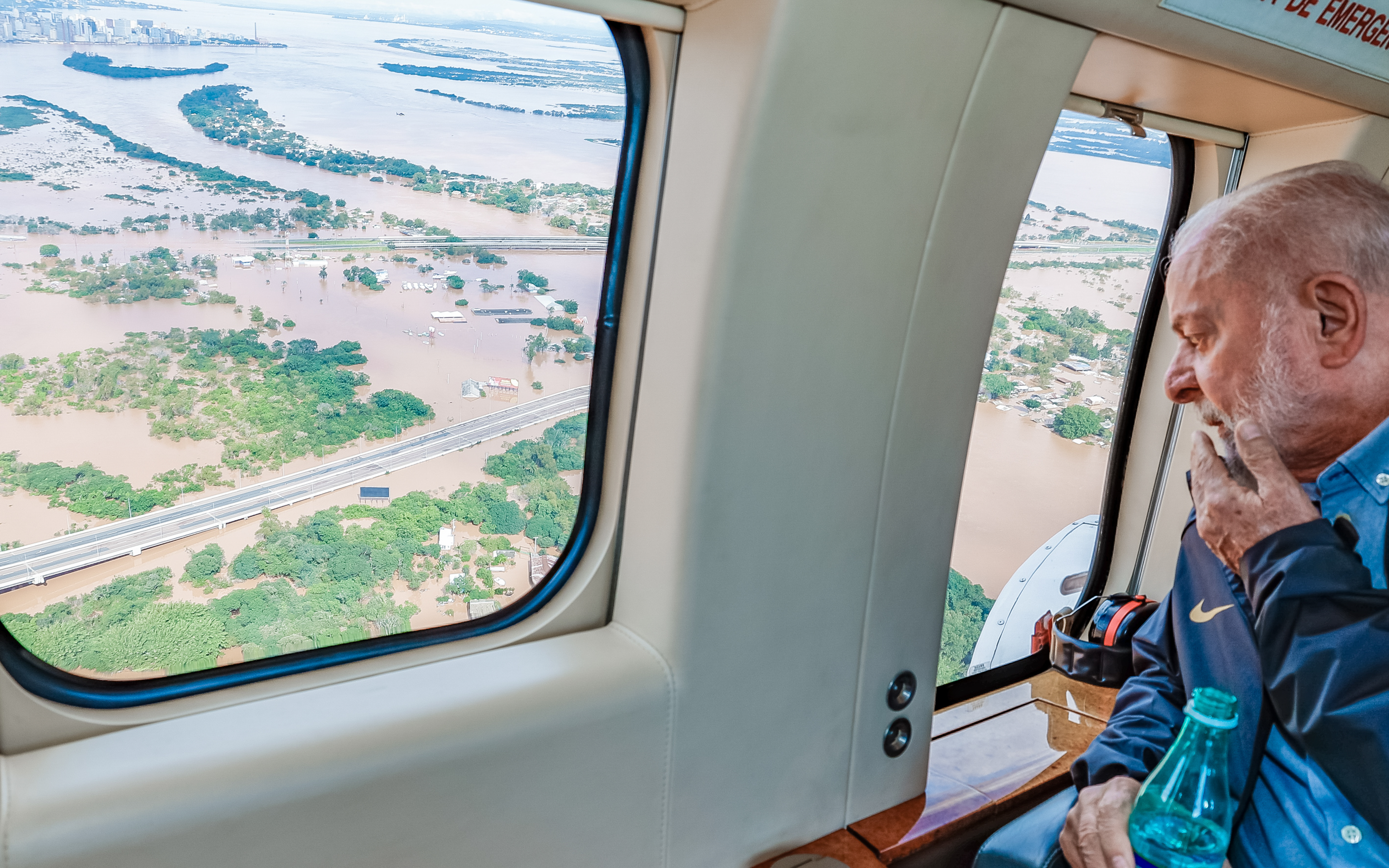
President Luiz Inácio Lula da Silva flying over flooded areas in Canoas on 5 May 2024

President Luiz Inácio Lula da Silva visited Rio Grande do Sul on 2 May, holding a public speech in Santa Maria. The federal government sent aircraft, boats, and more than 600 soldiers to help clear roads, distribute food, water, and mattresses, and set up shelters, while local volunteers also helped with search efforts. More than 1,100 soldiers from the Army, the Navy, and the Air Force, as well as more than 2,000 between BMRS officers and firefighters, were reportedly involved in rescue operations across the state. National Force and Civil Defense members were also sent by the state governments of Bahia, Espírito Santo, Goiás, Mato Grosso, Minas Gerais, Paraná, Rio de Janeiro, Santa Catarina, and São Paulo. The National Army also installed a 40-bed field hospital in the municipality of Lajeado.

Flamengo, Palmeiras, São Paulo, and Atlético Mineiro all offered their stadiums and facilities to the affected football clubs; the latter team also made a R$100,000 (US$20,000) worth donation to the regional charity fund through their Instituto Galo foundation, and other Série A and Série B teams shared details about fundraising campaigns on social media, while the CBF donated R$1 million (US$200,000) to the victims and opened a parallel campaign. Starting from 6 May, the Civil Defense hosted a charity campaign for food donations in São José do Rio Preto.

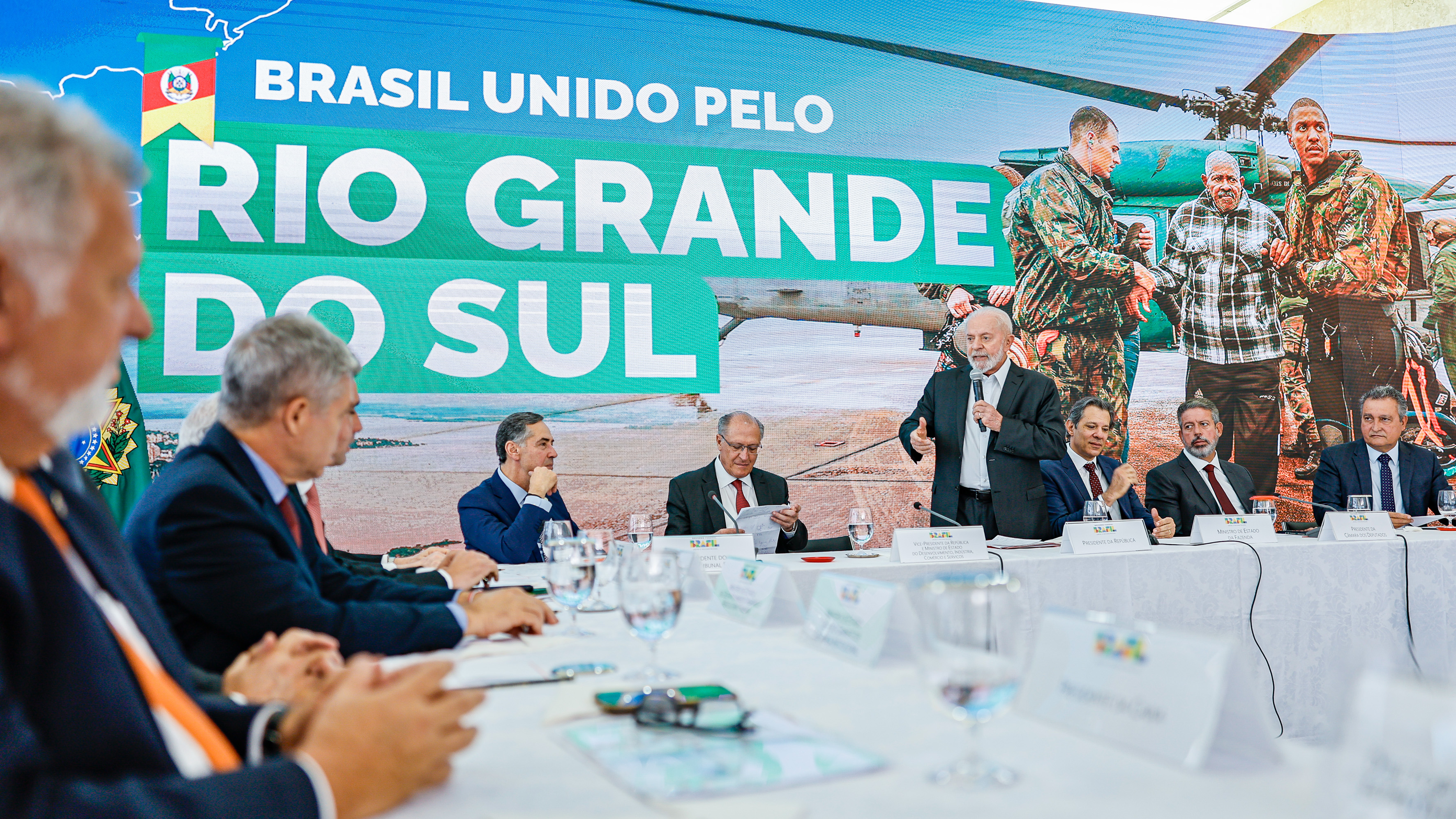
President Luiz Inácio Lula da Silva, Vice President Geraldo Alckmin, the Minister of Finance Fernando Haddad, and other government officials announcing federal resources for Rio Grande do Sul on 9 May 2024

On 5 May, after delivering the Angelus Address in St. Peter's Square in the Vatican City, Pope Francis expressed his solidarity to the victims of the floods; several other figures of the Brazilian Catholic Church commented on the disaster, including Archbishop of Porto Alegre and CNBB president, Jaime Spengler, as well as Archbishop of Santa Maria, Leomar Antônio Brustolin.

On 9 May, the Brazilian government, through the Minister of Finance, Fernando Haddad, announced R$51 billion (US$10 billion) in resources and benefits for the state of Rio Grande do Sul. The state-owned national bank Caixa Econômica Federal announced another R$66.8 billion (US$13.1 billion) in forms of financing and benefits.

==== Mobilization of military resources ====
On 6 May, the Brazilian Navy announced the dispatch of the largest warship in South America, the helicopter carrier Atlântico, which would depart Rio de Janeiro and head to the coast of Rio Grande do Sul. Atlântico was expected to carry 200 Marine Corps officers, 40 vehicles and eight between medium, and small vessels to help rescue stranded victims and transport supplies through flooded roads.

The Navy also mobilized the Oceanic Support Ship Mearim and the offshore patrol vessel Amazonas, with the latter carrying three small vessels. The two ships sailed to Rio Grande do Sul on 7 May. The following day, the frigate Defensora was also dispatched in order to transport donations and supplies. As of 11 May, 12,000 Brazilian armed forces personnel are on the ground for the relief operations.

The Santa Maria-based Horus squadron of the Brazilian Air Force assisted in rescue missions with Hermes 900 drones, locating 36 victims in need of rescue between 5–6 May and lasing their positions to rescue helicopters. A Hermes 900 drone crashed due to a "technical problem" in the morning of 8 May, in an accident pending investigation by CENIPA. A replacement drone was bought in September 2024.

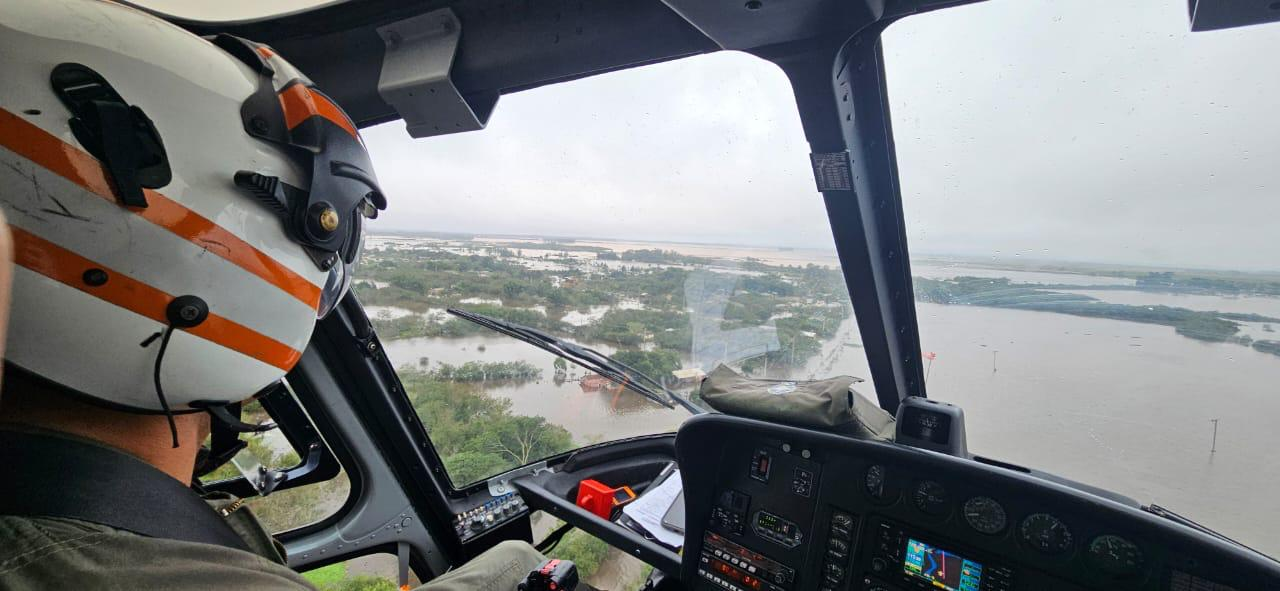
Brazilian Navy helicopter over flooded areas on 4 May 2024

==== Civil society ====
Since the start of the heavy rains, civilian volunteers have mobilized to rescue marooned families and to assist families rescued in gyms, schools, and churches. They used all-terrain vehicles, trucks, boats, water motorcycles, and other transportation to rescue people and animals from flooded areas. Residents of less affected cities also organized themselves to support the search for and assistance to homeless families, as was the case with residents of the municipality of Portão, in Porto Alegre, who formed a network of around 100 volunteers to work in the neighboring cities of São Leopoldo, São Sebastião do Caí, and Montenegro. Some volunteers also started using their own homes as shelters for the people affected or as kitchens to produce meals. In some cases, volunteers used surfboards to search for and rescue the people who were affected. Volunteers also focused on rescuing and sheltering pets; in some warehouses, shelters were set up to receive dogs and cats. In Canoas, a makeshift center had already received 600 dogs as of 7 May 2024. In the Mathias Velho neighborhood of Canoas, a horse dubbed "Caramelo" was stranded on a rooftop for four days before being rescued. Due to the insufficient number of fire departments, civil defense, and armed forces personnel in some areas of the state at the beginning of the relief operations, some people waited three days to be rescued. On 5 May 2024, the mayor of Canoas, Jairo Jorge, asked boat owners to help in the search voluntarily. As a measure to speed up rescues, a group from Centro Universitário Ritter dos Reis voluntarily and independently created an internet platform as a way of centralizing rescue efforts and also making it possible to make requests for help, with requests for help being transformed into geolocation points with routes to the location. As of 9 May 2024, it had already collaborated with more than 12,000 rescues. Other independent initiatives, such as Projeto Salva, support flood victims and animal rescues. Around 20 private helicopters have been used voluntarily to rescue people affected by the floods. On 10 May, private aircraft departing from São Paulo were responsible for transporting 2.5 tons of donations.

Universo Online reported that a group of volunteers were forced to retrieve thousands of firearms at Salgado Filho Porto Alegre International Airport by a representative of arms manufacturer Taurus Armas, saying that the representative misled them into launching what they were initially told to be rescue operations for people stranded at the airport, who then threatened to have them detained if they refused to proceed on security grounds.

==== International aid for humanitarian assistance ====
On 3 May 2024, the Venezuelan Minister of Foreign Affairs, Yván Gil, offered the Brazilian government support on behalf of the Venezuelan government and President Nicolás Maduro.

On 5 May, the government of Uruguay sent an Air Force (FAU) Delfin Bell 212 helicopter and its crew to Brazil and offered two drones and two rescue boats to assist in the rescues. A Lockheed Martin KC-130 plane from the FAU with equipment and humanitarian aid was also offered, but was refused by Brazilian authorities due to a lack of proper aerodromes, which were equally damaged by the floods.

On 6 May, the Argentine government, led by President Javier Milei, announced that they would send 20 Federal Police officers and divers from the Argentine Navy, as well as three helicopters and a C-130 cargo plane from the Argentine Air Force.

On 9 May, a humanitarian aid package was announced, consisting of approximately 2,500 tons of food, 48,000 liters of potable water, 5,000 hygiene and cleaning kits, 400 water filters, and about 5,000 bedding items transported by three Azul Brazilian Airlines planes in partnership with the Helping Hands project of The Church of Jesus Christ of Latter-day Saints.

On 10 May, the White House National Security Advisor, John Kirby, announced a donation of US$120,000 in resources and hygiene kits from the United States.

On 27 May, the USS George Washington, sailing through the Brazilian coast as part of its "Southern Seas 2024" deployment, conducted a vertical replenishment operation with the Atlântico, transferring 15 tons of humanitarian supplies from the nuclear aircraft carrier to the helicopter carrier as part of the relief efforts.

On 29 May, the Italian Minister of Foreign Affairs, Antonio Tajani, announced that the Italian government had sent a B-767 cargo plane with equipment and humanitarian aid, including medications, tents, electric generators and portable water purification devices, to Brazilian authorities. The Italian ambassador to Brazil, Alessandro Cortese, and the Italian consul general of Porto Alegre, Valerio Caruso, also visited Bento Gonçalves and Canoas, two of the areas affected by the floods. In an article written for Domani, trade-unionist and mediator Mario Giro urged Italian authorities to intensify their humanitarian efforts in Rio Grande do Sul as an act of respect towards the wide Italian Brazilian community settled in the region.

== See also ==
- 2023 Rio Grande do Sul floods
- Weather of 2024
- Caramelo (horse), a horse known for having spent at least four days on a roof during the floods
