= Vila Assunção =

Neighbourhood in Porto Alegre, Brazil

Coordinates: 30°06′S 51°15′W

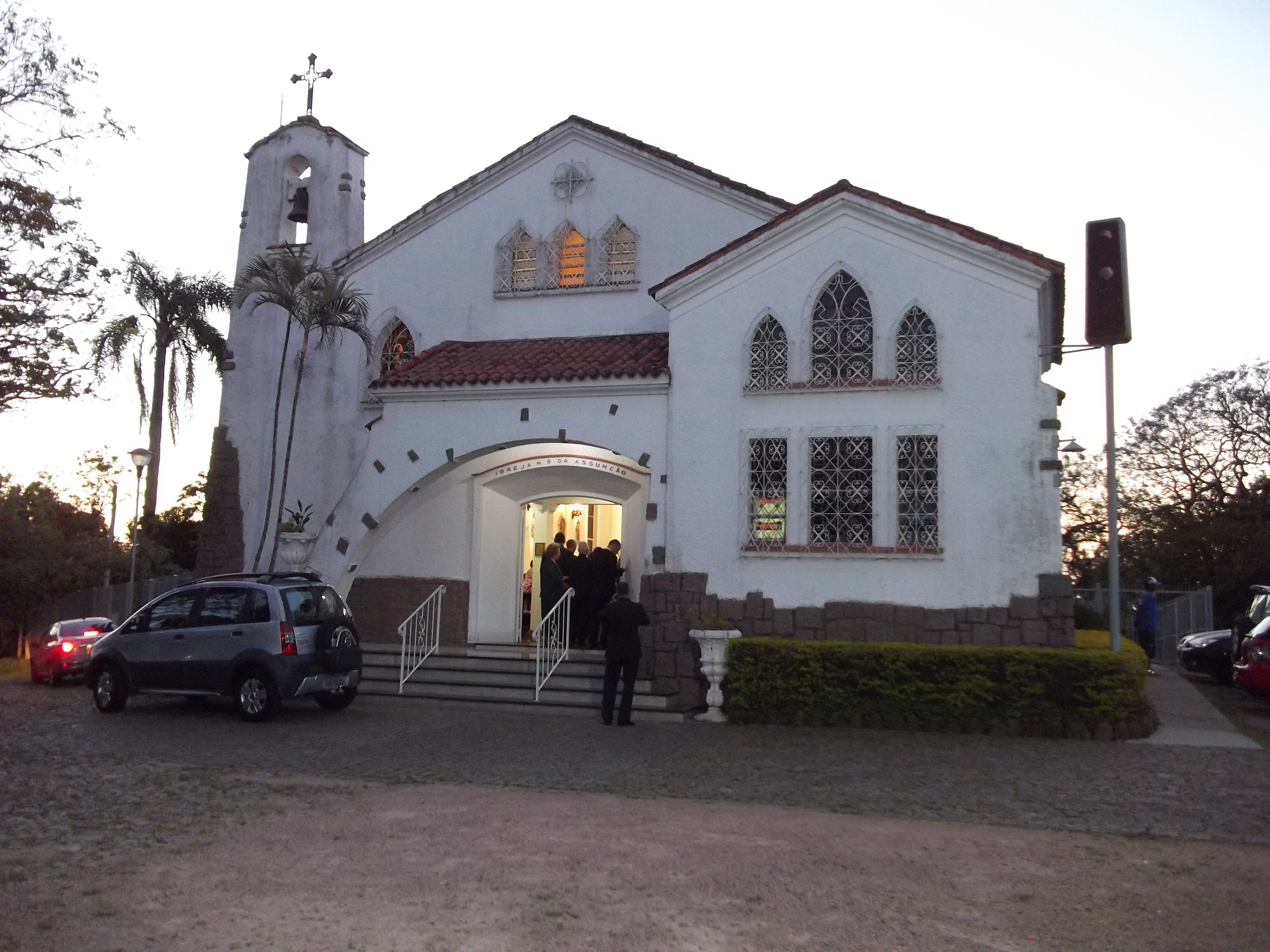
Igreja Nossa Senhora da Assunção, a church in Spanish colonial style.

Vila Assunção (meaning Assumption Villa in English) is a neighbourhood (bairro) in the city of Porto Alegre, the state capital of Rio Grande do Sul, in Brazil. It was created by Law 2022 from December 7, 1959, being located on the bank of Guaíba Lake.

Vila Assunção was named after José Joaquim Assunção, who lived here in his chácara (a rural property). When he died, his widow made a deal with the Di Primio Beck company in order to urbanize the region.

The neighbourhood is predominantly residential made up of people from the upper middle class and upper class. However, some upscale shops, restaurants and parties have been installed there in the last fifteen years, as well as in the neighbouring Tristeza.

The first inhabitants in Vila Assunção were a Tupi people, and that's the reason why there are streets and squares called Timbira, Guaraum, Araguaia, etc.

During the 1940s, due to its location on the bank of Guaíba Lake, Vila Assunção attracted many people interested in its beach.

== Famous residents ==
- Dilma Rousseff, from 2011 to 2016, President of Brazil
- Werner Schünemann, actor
