= Caramelo (horse) =

Brazilian horse notable for surviving a flood

Caramelo (lit. 'Caramel') is a horse (Note: Initially, it was believed to be a horse. However, the São Paulo State Security Secretariat (SSP) announced that it was a mare. Later on, the veterinary hospital of the Lutheran University of Brazil (Ulbra) confirmed that it was indeed a horse.) known for having spent at least four days on a roof in Canoas during the May 2024 Rio Grande do Sul floods.

== Rescue ==
Caramelo stranded on the roof of a house

The horse was stranded in a house in the Mathias Velho neighborhood, Canoas, during the floods that occurred in Rio Grande do Sul in May 2024. He spent about four days stranded. According to veterinarians consulted by CNN Brasil, he survived because he was probably very well hydrated and fed.

On 8 May, Caramelo began to be monitored and some teams unsuccessfully attempted the rescue. The mayor of Canoas, Jairo Jorge (PSD), told GloboNews that the rescue would require a helicopter. The rescue planning was done during the night with the São Paulo State Fire Department and the team of veterinarians who helped rescue other stranded animals during the flood, including two horses that were trapped on a building staircase.

On 9 May, the rescue was carried out by the Fire Department accompanied by a team of veterinarians. The team was mobilized by General Hertz Pires do Nascimento, commander of the Brazilian Army operations in Rio Grande do Sul. Five boats and a helicopter were made available for the rescue. Around 11 a.m., Caramelo was anesthetized, laid down, and placed in a boat, where saline solution was used to keep him hydrated. He reached dry land around noon, when the boat was removed with Caramelo inside and placed on a trailer, where he was dried and taken to the veterinary hospital of the Lutheran University of Brazil (Ulbra). Caramelo was described as docile by veterinarians and weighed between 450 and 500 kg (990 and 1,100 lb) when rescued. Two dogs that were stranded on a nearby roof were also rescued.

At the hospital, it was checked whether Caramelo was injured and he received intravenous sugar solution to replace the liquid he lost while stranded. The horse was initially fed with a pasty food, with veterinarians planning to transition to grass as he recovered. On 10 May, he had a stable clinical condition, but was still dehydrated.

== Impact ==
Caramelo became nationally famous when he was filmed by TV Globo helicopter on 8 May. His rescue was widely reported in Brazil. Some newspapers, such as Metrópoles and Correio Braziliense, claimed that Caramelo was a symbol of resilience during the flood. Veja magazine stated that Caramelo's rescue showed the government's negligence regarding the flood warnings. The president of the Supreme Federal Court, Roberto Barroso, described the scene as emblematic. The horse stirred up emotions on social media. It was internet users who nicknamed him Caramelo (lit. 'Caramel'). On 8 May, the hashtag #SaveTheCanoasHorse trended on X (formerly Twitter). In addition to rescue requests, he was portrayed in memes, and journalist Renato Peters created a cartoon of him. Celebrities like Felipe Neto pressured for his rescue. The rescue also gained international attention.

The rescue was followed by Eduardo Paganella, a reporter for RBS TV. The rescue was also broadcast live on Mais Você, and it moved Ana Maria Braga deeply. President Luiz Inácio Lula da Silva said he slept restlessly the night before the rescue and that Caramelo deserved "a good rest". First Lady Rosângela Lula da Silva also became emotional and said she was in contact with a stud farm where the horse would be transported. In response, comedian Whindersson Nunes posted a photo of actress Jade Picon in the soap opera Travessia washing clothes by hand in a river. Rosângela countered the post by writing that "he doesn't know that washing machines have been invented for a long time", but the comedian responded that "this tweet doesn't allude to household chores, it alludes to doing a lot of hassle for something, about getting your hands dirty and making a big fuss about something".

Shortly after his admission, some people showed up at the veterinary hospital claiming to be the owners of the animal. Giovanna Ewbank and Felipe Neto offered to adopt Caramelo.

== See also ==
- Caramelo (dog)
