= Ponta Grossa, Rio Grande do Sul =

Neighbourhood in Porto Alegre, Brazil

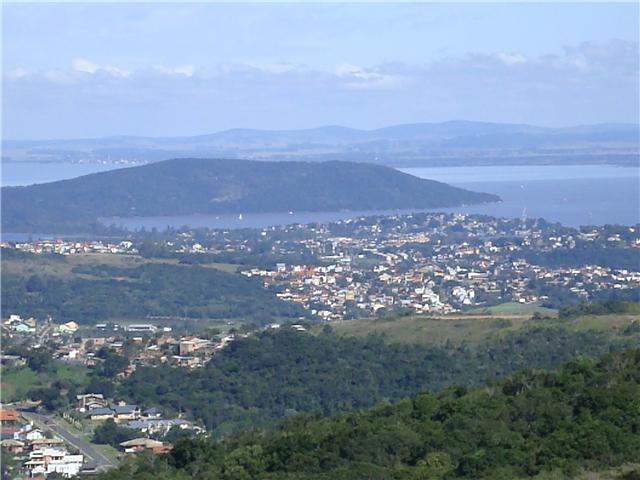
View of Ponta Grossa Hill from Santuário Mãe de Deus.

Ponta Grossa (meaning Thick Point in English) is a neighbourhood (bairro) in the city of Porto Alegre, the state capital of Rio Grande do Sul, in Brazil. It was created by Law 6893 12 September 1991, but had its limits modified by Law 9993 16 June 2006.

The neighbourhood was named after a 145-metre (476 ft) hill called Ponta Grossa, which is also a peninsula within Guaíba Lake. The name is quite old, because it was indicated in a map dating from 1763.

In 2000, there were 3,290 inhabitants in Ponta Grossa.
