= Tristeza, Porto Alegre =

Neighborhood in Porto Alegre

Coordinates: 30°07′S 51°15′W

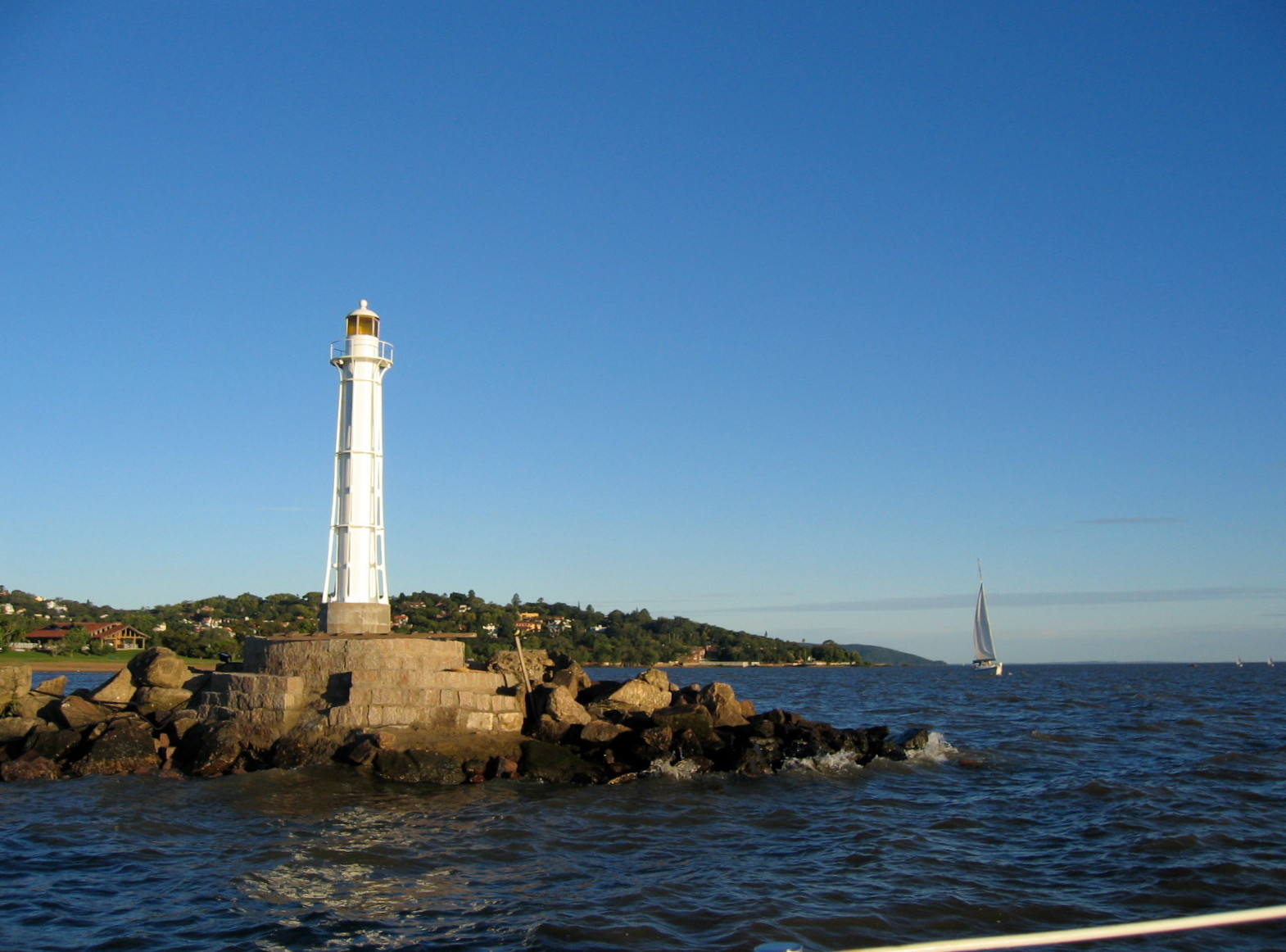
The lighthouse of Clube dos Jangadeiros, a nautical club in Tristeza.

Tristeza (meaning Sadness in Portuguese) is a neighbourhood in the city of Porto Alegre, the state capital of Rio Grande do Sul, Brazil. It was created by Law 2022 from December 7, 1959.

The neighbourhood was named after José da Silva Guimarães's nickname, Tristeza, who was its first dweller.

Tristeza embraces people from upper middle class to upper class, mainly in the three long blocks near the Guaíba Lake and in the Sétimo Céu area, that, although it's officially part of Tristeza, it looks more like Vila Conceição, because both were founded as the same batch of houses, the Vila Conceição batch.

Also, there is located a private school for children, Escola Creare.

== Notable residents ==
- Dilma Rousseff, former President of Brazil
