= Donaldo Ross =

Uruguayan footballer and manager (1904–1972)

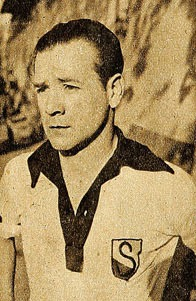
- Ross with Deportes Santiago in 1935

Personal information
- Date of birth: 1904
- Place of birth: Montevideo, Uruguay
- Date of death: 1972 (aged 67–68)
- Place of death: Guadalajara, Mexico
- Position: Midfielder

Senior career*
Years	Team	Apps	(Gls)
- Uruguay Onward
- Charley FC
1923	Defensor		
- Nacional SP
- Grêmio Santanense
- Cachoeira
1925–1926	14 de Julho		
1927–1929	Internacional		
1930	Pelotas		
1931	Urania		
- Circolo Sportivo Italiano
1933	Figueres		
1934	Barcelona	1	(0)
1935	Deportes Santiago		
- América de Rancagua

Managerial career
- Colo-Colo
- 1937: Rivadavia
- Juventud Junior
- Atlético Nacional
- Centro Atlético
- 1947: América de Cali
- 1949–1955: Once Deportivo
- 1955: Millonarios
- 1955–1957: Guadalajara
- 1957: Irapuato
- 1958–1961: Necaxa
- 1961–1962: Morelia
- 1962–1963: Necaxa
- 1963: CD Nacional
- 1965: Tepic
- 1966: CD Zamora
- 1967: Tepic
- 1971–1972: UAG
- * Club domestic league appearances and goals

Donaldo Ross (1904 – 1972) was a Uruguayan football player and manager.

== Early and personal life ==
Ross was born in 1904 in Montevideo. His brother was Conrado Ross.

== Career ==
Ross spent his early career in Uruguay with Charley and Defensor. He then played in Brazil for 14 de Julho, Internacional and Pelotas. He also had a stint in Spain with UE Figueres and Barcelona. He finished his career in Chile with Deportes Santiago and América de Rancagua.

After retiring as a player he became a manager, including for Colo-Colo in Chile, Millonarios in Colombia, and Guadalajara and Necaxa in Mexico.

== Later life and death ==
He died in Guadalajara in 1972, suffering an acute myocardial infarction whilst riding on the bus.
