= Serraria, Rio Grande do Sul =

Neighborhood in Porto Alegre

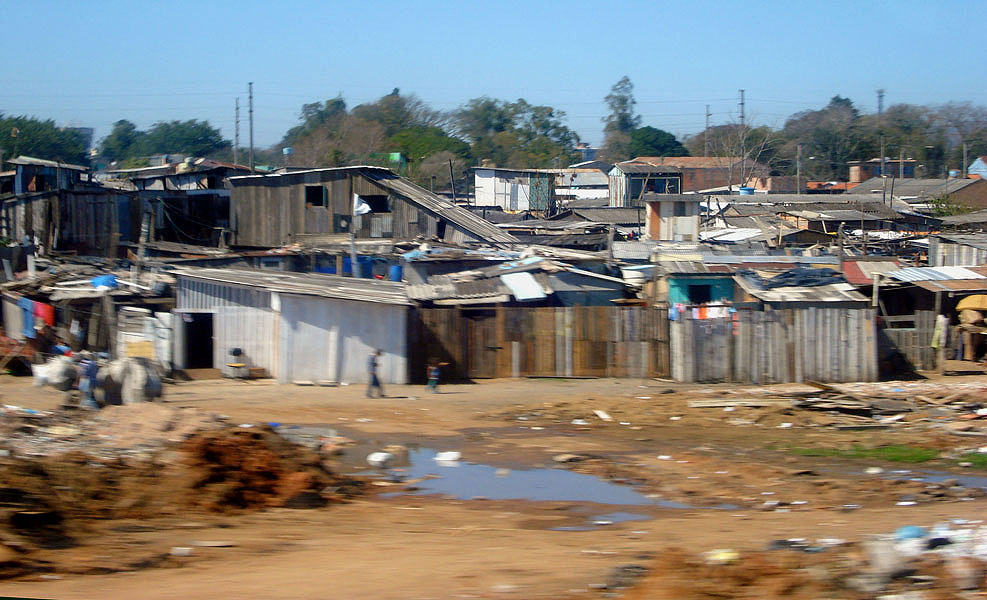
Aspect of Vila dos Sargentos.

Serraria (meaning Sawmill in Portuguese) is a neighbourhood (bairro) in the city of Porto Alegre, the state capital of Rio Grande do Sul, in Brazil. It was created by Law 6893 from September 12, 1991.

Serraria is a middle and lower class neighbourhood in Porto Alegre. It is also home to Vila dos Sargentos, a shanty-town located on the bank of Guaíba Lake.
