= List of hills of Porto Alegre =

Hills make up some 24% of Porto Alegre's area. Median height of Porto Alegre's hills is 147 meters (482.28 ft).

== List of Hills ==
#	Name	Height in m	Height in ft
1	Santana	311	1,020.34
2	Pelado	298	977.69
3	Polícia	291	954.72
4	São Pedro	289	948.16
5	Pedra Redonda	282	925.19
6	Glória	279	915.34
7	Teresópolis	262	859.58
8	Tapera	252	826.77
9	Companhia	224	734.9
10	Quirinas	211	692.25
10	Extrema	211	692.25
12	Agudo	210	688.97
13	Belém Velho	208	682.41
14	Abertas	173	567.58
15	Pasmado	170	557.74
16	Tiririca	149	488.84
16	Taquara/Beltrão	149	488.84
18	Santa Teresa	148	485.56
19	Ponta Grossa	145	475.72
20	Meireles	143	469.16
20	Goulart/Pinheiro	143	469.16
22	Osso	141	462.59
23	Alto Teresópolis	139	456.03
23	Primavera/Sepé Tiaraju	139	456.03
24	Cruz	120	393.70
25	Coxilha do Butiá	112	367.45
26	Santo Antônio	104	341.20
27	Espíndola	101	331.36
28	Menino Deus	98	321.52
29	Leão	78	255.90
30	Belém Novo	77	252.62
31	Difini	63	206.69
32	Arado	62	203.41
32	Sezefredo	62	203.41
32	Prado	62	203.41
35	Cuíca	51	167.32
36	Sabiá	49	163.59
37	Lami	48	157.48
38	Serraria	42	137.79
39	Boa Vista	41	134.51
39	Chapéu do Sol	41	134.51
41	Cego	30	98.42

== Sources ==
- "Morros." Prefeitura de Porto Alegre. 23 Sept. 2006
