= Régis Júnior =

Brazilian footballer

Personal information
- Full name: Régis Thadeu Rosa Júnior
- Date of birth: 30 August 1978 (age 48)
- Place of birth: Porto Alegre, Brazil
- Position: Centre-back

Youth career
- Internacional

Senior career*
Years	Team	Apps	(Gls)
1999	Caxias		
- * Club domestic league appearances and goals as of 21 October 2023

Régis Thadeu Rosa Júnior (born 30 August 1978), mostly known as Régis Júnior or Régis, is a Brazilian former professional footballer who played as a centre-back.

== Career ==
On 13 November 1999, in the match Santo Ângelo vs. Caxias, valid for the 1999 Copa Mais Fácil, Régis was punched in the back of the head by player Darzone. Régis was in a coma for 19 days and the player had to end his career due to the consequences. Darzone was suspended for 30 days and then resumed his career normally, retiring in 2012. At the time, SER Caxias was coached by Tite.

== Post career ==
After retiring, Régis graduated in Physical Education from ULBRA and worked as a real estate agent. He uses medication to combat severe headaches to this day.
