= Caramelo (disambiguation) =

Caramelo is a 2002 novel by Sandra Cisneros.

Caramelo may also refer to:

- Caramelo (film), a 2025 Brazilian film about a street dog
- Caramelo (dog), a Brazilian mixed-breed dog
- Caramelo (song), a 2020 single by Ozuna
- Caramelo (horse), a horse
- Mateus Caramelo (1994–2016), Brazilian footballer
- Diogo Caramelo (born 1992), Portuguese former footballer
