= Jardim Carvalho =

Coordinates: 30°03′16″S 51°08′50″W

Jardim Carvalho (meaning Oak Garden in English) is a neighbourhood (bairro) in the city of Porto Alegre, the state capital of Rio Grande do Sul, in Brazil. It was created by Law 6720 from November 21, 1990.

The Independência Hospital, linked to the Universidade Luterana do Brasil, is located in the neighbourhood.
