= 14 de Julho =

Partially collapsed hydroelectric dam

Coordinates: 29.0651°S 51.6746°W

14 de Julho is a partially collapsed hydroelectric dam, formerly with around 100 MW of power, that is located in the Das Antas River between the municipalities of Cotiporã and Bento Gonçalves in Brazil. The dam had an estimated capacity of 55.18 million cubic meters before its collapse. Its construction project started in 2004 and subsequently entered into commercial operation in 2008.

== Collapse ==
On May 2, 2024, the dam partially collapsed during heavy rains. After the collapse, the region has since been declared a state of emergency by Rio Grande do Sul state governor Eduardo Leite, and the Civil Defense issued a statement warning residents in regions around the Taquari River to leave their homes. The collapse of the dam created a two-meter (6.6-foot; 79-inch) wave that exacerbated the 2024 flooding of Rio Grande do Sul.

The Brazilian company Companhia Energética Rio das Antas (CERAN) later issued a statement stating that the dam collapse did not significantly alter the flow dynamics in the Taquari–Antas basin.
