= Pedra Redonda =

Neighborhood in Porto Alegre, Brazil

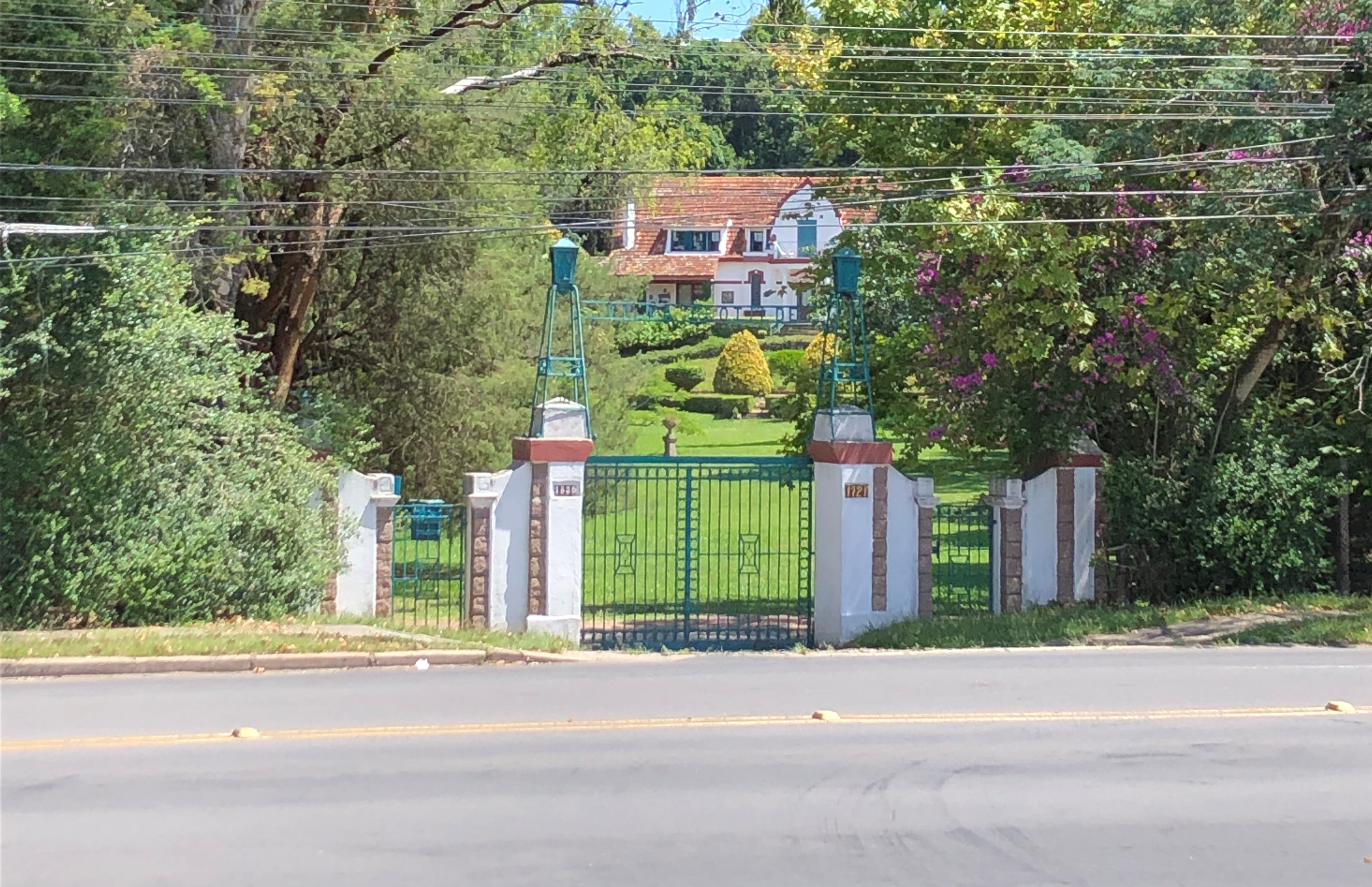
Vila Clotilde, an old house in Pedra Redonda.

Pedra Redonda (literally Round Stone in English) is a neighbourhood (bairro) in the city of Porto Alegre, the state capital of Rio Grande do Sul, in Brazil. It was created by Law 2022 from December 7, 1959.

The neighbourhood is known for its views of Guaíba Lake, and its proximity to the lake, having some large houses at the lake's edge, and some in other parts of the locality. Pedra Redonda residents include people from upper middle class to upper class.
