= List of mayors of Canoas =

The following is a list of mayors of the city of Canoas, in the state of Rio Grande do Sul, Brazil.

- Edgar Braga da Fontoura, 1940-1941
- Júlio Cardoso de Araújo, 1941
- Aluízio Palmeiro de Escobar, 1941-1945
- Nelson Paim Terra, 1945-1951
- Paulo Ribeiro, 1945
- José João de Medeiros, 1951
- Arthur Pereira de Vargas, 1951
- Sady Fontoura Schivitz, 1952-1955
- Sezefredo Azambuja Vieira, 1956-1959
- José João de Medeiros, 1960-1963
- Hugo Simões Lagranha, 1964-1971, 1983-1984, 1989-1992, 1997-2000
- Daniel Cruz da Costa, 1971-1973
- Geraldo Gilberto Ludwig, 1973-1978, 1978-1979
- Luiz Jeronymo Busato, 1978
- Oswaldo Cypriano Guindani, 1979-1983
- Ney de Moura Calixto, 1983
- Cláudio Bloedow Schultz, 1984-1985
- Francisco Biazus, 1985
- Carlos Loureiro Giacomazzi, 1986-1988
- Liberty Dick Conter, 1993-1996
- Marcos Antônio Ronchetti, 2001-2008
- Jairo Jorge, 2009-2016
- Luiz Carlos Busato, 2017-2021
- Jairo Jorge, 2021-2026
- Airton Jose de Souza, 2026-present

== See also ==
- Politics of Canoas
- History of Canoas
- List of mayors of largest cities in Brazil (in Portuguese)
