= Vila Conceição =

Vila Conceição (meaning Conception Villa in English) is a tiny neighbourhood (bairro) in the city of Porto Alegre, the state capital of Rio Grande do Sul, in Brazil. It was created by Law 2022 from December 7, 1959.

Vila Conceição is a residential neighbourhood located on the bank of Guaíba Lake, that embrace people from upper middle class to upper class. It is characterized by sophisticated houses situated in steep terrains, with curved, wooded and quiet streets, some of them leaned over the Guaíba Lake. The Vila Conceição is also known to be owner of a paradisiacal view to the Guaíba Lake, mainly the Sétimo Céu area.
