= Eldorado do Sul =

Municipality of Rio Grande do Sul, Brazil

- Municipality
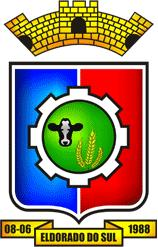
- Flag Coat of arms

- Location within Rio Grande do Sul

- Location in Brazil
- Coordinates: 30°5′2″S 51°36′57″W
- Country: Brazil
- State: Rio Grande do Sul

Population (2020)
  - Total: 41,902
- Time zone: UTC−3 (BRT)
- Website: Site Oficial

Eldorado do Sul is a municipality in the state of Rio Grande do Sul, Brazil. It is located in the metropolitan area of Porto Alegre, the state's capital and largest city, opposite the capital on the right bank of Guaíba River. Population: 41,902 (est. 2020).

Eldorado do Sul was hit badly by the 2024 Rio Grande do Sul floods, being completely engulfed. The mayor said that "the city has been 100% destroyed by these floods."

== See also ==
- List of municipalities in Rio Grande do Sul
