= Conrad Ross =

Uruguayan footballer and manager

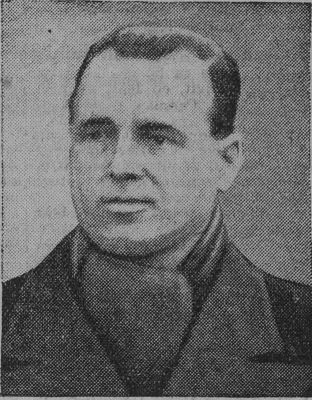
- Ross in 1936

Personal information
- Date of birth: 8 August 1908
- Place of birth: Montevideo, Uruguay
- Position: Forward

Senior career*
Years	Team	Apps	(Gls)
1919–1920	River Plate (Montevideo)		
1921–1922	Peñarol		
1923–1925	Portuguesa		
- Juventude
1932–1934	Urania Genève Sport		
1934–1935	Sochaux		

Managerial career
- 1932: Urania Genève Sport
- 1934–1939: Sochaux
- 1940–1941: Portuguesa
- 1942–1943: São Paulo
- 1945: Portuguesa
- 1946: Palmeiras
- 1947–1948: Portuguesa
- Guarani
- América-SP
- * Club domestic league appearances and goals

Conrad Ross, also known as Conrado Ross (born 8 August 1908) was a Uruguayan football player and manager.

== Early and personal life ==
Ross was born on 8 August 1908 in Montevideo. His brother was Donaldo Ross.

== Career ==
Ross spent his early career in Uruguay with River Plate (Montevideo) and Peñarol.

Ross began his career in Brazil with Portuguesa in 1923, later playing for Juventude.

Ross also spent time as a player in Switzerland with Urania Genève Sport and in France with Sochaux. Ross was also player-manager of both clubs.

He also managed Brazilian clubs Portuguesa, São Paulo, Palmeiras, Guarani and América-SP.
