= Ipira =

Coordinates: 27.4036°S 51.7731°W

- Municipality
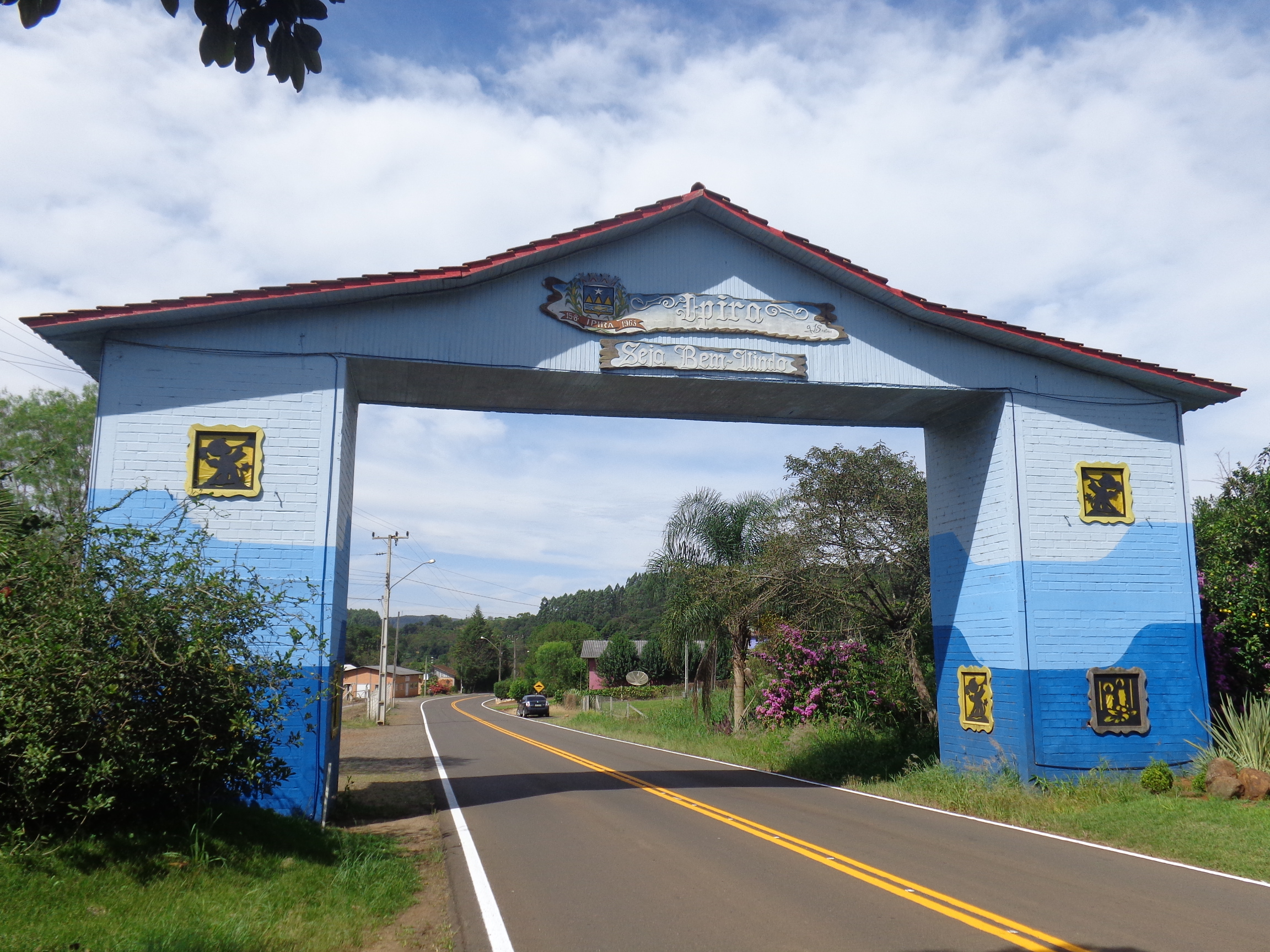

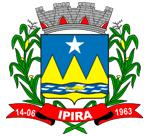
- Flag Coat of arms
- Interactive map of Ipira
- Country: Brazil
- Region: South
- State: Santa Catarina
- Mesoregion: Oeste Catarinense

Area
  - Total: 58 sq mi (150 km^{2})

Population (2020)
  - Total: 4,406
- Time zone: UTC -3

Ipira is a municipality in the state of Santa Catarina in the South region of Brazil. It is part of the "Concórdia" micro-region.

== History ==
The modern history of Ipira begins at the end of the nineteenth century with the arrival from Rio Grande do Sul, of the first colonists, in 1890. They settled various areas currently included in Ipira. Ipira itself dates from 1913 when Antônio Ko Freitag acquired a parcel of land from the railway company. Between 1915 and 1917 more settler families arrived from the Brazilian south, these coming from Montenegro.

== See also ==
- List of municipalities in Santa Catarina
