= Jairo Jorge =

Brazilian journalist and politician (born 1963)

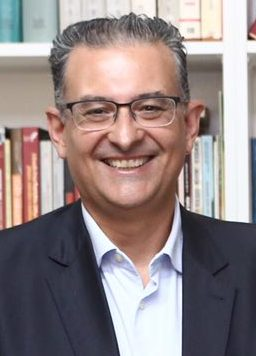
- Jairo Jorge in 2018.

Mayor of Canoas
- In office 1 January 2021 – 1 January 2025
- Preceded by: Luiz Carlos Busato
- Succeeded by: Airton José de Souza
- In office 1 January 2009 – 1 January 2017
- Preceded by: Marcos Antônio Ronchetti
- Succeeded by: Luiz Carlos Busato

Councilman of Canoas
- In office 1 January 1989 – 1 January 1993

Personal details
- Born: Jairo Jorge da Silva; 9 May 1963 (age 63) Canoas, Rio Grande do Sul, Brazil
- Party: PT (1984–2016); PDT (2016–2019); PSD (2019–present)
- Occupation: Journalist, politician

Jairo Jorge da Silva (born 9 May 1963) is a Brazilian journalist and politician who was elected mayor of the city of Canoas, in the state of Rio Grande do Sul, in 2020. He had previously served in the position from 2009 to 2017, as well as a councilman in the city from 1989 to 1993.

He was removed from the position by judicial authorities from 31 March 2022 to 28 March 2023 due to an investigation into funds diverted away from the city's health department. During this time period, his vice-mayor, Nedy Vargas, became mayor.

== Political career ==
In 1985, at 22 years old, Silva became a candidate to be the mayor of Canoas for the Workers’ Party (PT), reaching third place and, with his next run for office, was the most voted for councilman in his city and in the interior of the state of Rio Grande do Sul for that year. He also worked for Tarso Genro during his time as mayor of Porto Alegre in 2001, and was the interim state minister of Education in 2004. In 2006, he assumed the position of pro-rector at the Lutheran University of Brazil (ULBRA), coming into the position a little before a crisis hit the university to become a candidate for mayor.

Silva was elected mayor of Canoas on 26 October 2008 with 52.63% of the vote. He won in the second round against Jurandir Maciel, who was at that point the vice-mayor. Silva was the first mayor from the PT in the city's history. He was reelected in 2012 with 71.27% of the vote, compared to just 15.47% for the second place candidate, Gisele Uequed. It was the largest vote share of a candidate in the city's history. During his second term, Silva was rated in opinion polls as the mayor with the highest approval rating among the largest cities of Rio Grande do Sul. He had a 77.8% approval rating among the city's residents and the city's management had a 59.9% approval rating.

In 2016, not being able to rerun for reelection, pointed towards his vice-mayor Beth Colombo to succeed him. Colombo, who was then a member of the Progressistas (PP), joined the Republicanos to run. The PT, the party Silva formerly associated with, indicated Mário Cardoso as their vice-mayoral candidate. Colombo led the polls and was predicted to win in the first round, but instead received 45.79%, against 37.3% for Luiz Carlos Busato (PTB). In the 2nd round, Busato won the election for mayor, with 51.25% to Colombo's 48.75%.

After Colombo was not elected, Silva announced his disaffiliation with the PT. He was heavily criticized for, during the elections, not defending the PT's candidate in the municipality. That same year, he became affiliated with the Democratic Labour Party (PDT). The party announced Silva as their pre-candidate for the governor's race in Rio Grande do Sul in 2018. After initially leaving the mayor's office in Canoas, he began a series of visits to cities throughout Rio Grande do Sul during his pre-candidacy as governor of the state.

Silva restarted his journalism career in 2017, hosting the Domínio Público program on Sunday nights at TV Urbana. In the program, he interviews various public figures and hosts debates about education, innovation, and the future of Rio Grande do Sul.

Silva was cited by Alexandrino Oliveira, the former director of Odebrecht, in the middle of Operation Car Wash, as having received R$450,000 via a caixa 2 during his campaigns in 2008 and 2012. The Public Prosecutor's Office (MPF) in Rio Grande do Sul, requested that the Federal Police open an inquiry on the allegation. In his defense, Silva said that all of the funds were received legally by the national directory of the PT and constituted installment payments in those respective years. He also mentioned that of the 835 projects completed during his time as mayor, none were executed by Odebrecht.

In 2019, Silva announced that he had left the PDT, on the pretext that the PDT became part of the coalition of Busato's mayoralty. Afterwards, he announced he would run again for mayor in 2020. As a member of the Social Democratic Party (PSD), he won the election against Busato on 29 November 2020, with Nedy Vargas as vice-mayor. Silva returned to the mayoralty four years after being barred from his position. His main priority was addressing the crisis faced by the city in the face of the COVID-19 pandemic.

On 31 March 2022, he was barred agained by judicial decision by the 4th Criminal Court of the TJRS. He was also sentenced to 3 months of detention with substitution for allegedly illegally using resources from the city's National Health funds, and from the Hospital de Pronto Socorro's funds in particular, to pay for a traffic ticket. After a year, he returned to the mayoralty.
