= Cotiporã =

Municipality in Rio Grande do Sul, Brazil

Coordinates: 29°01′S 51°42′W

- Municipality
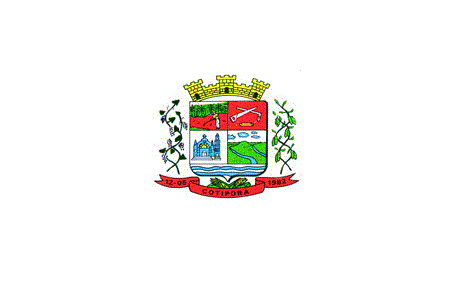
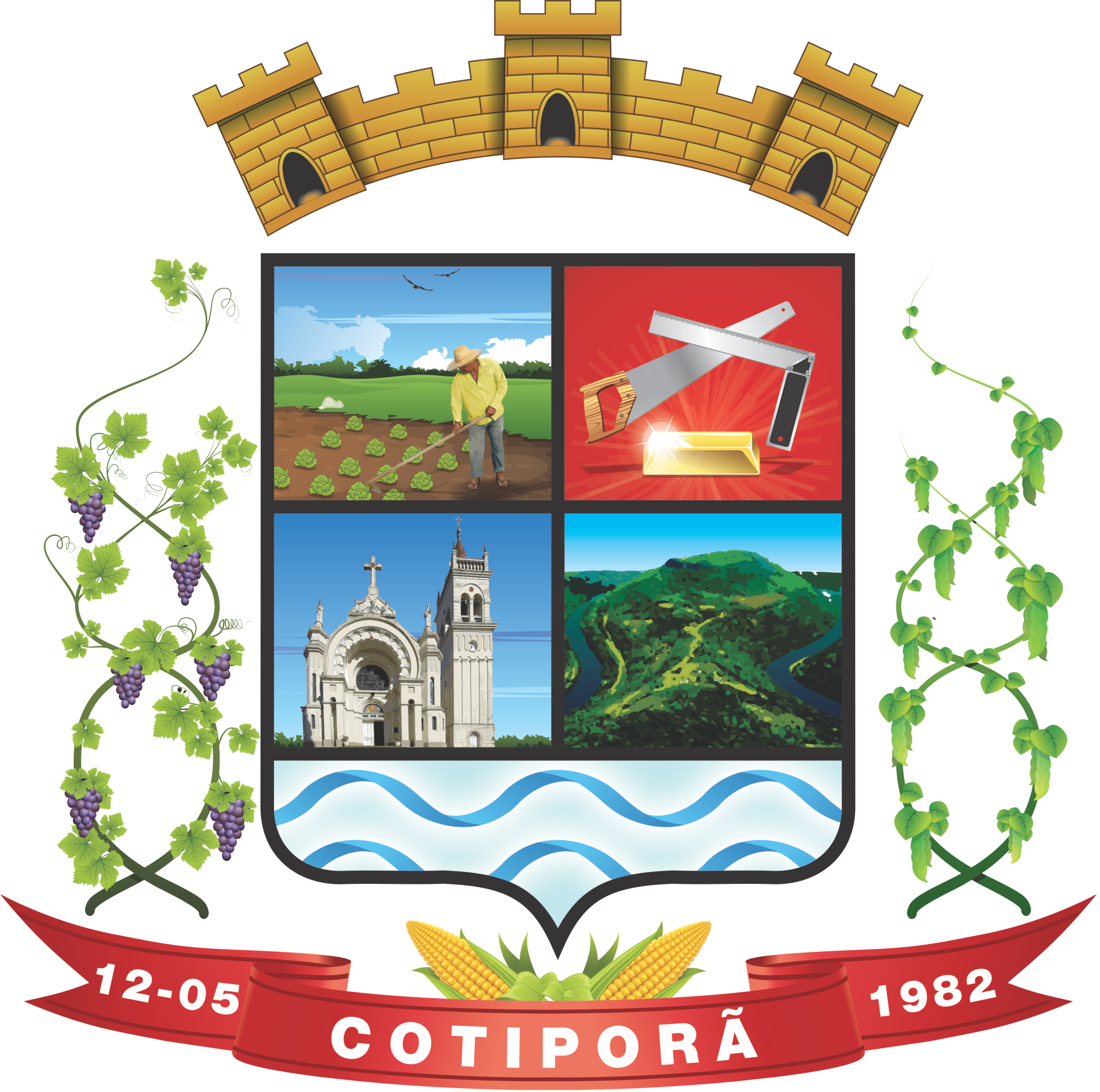
- Flag Coat of arms
- Interactive map of Cotiporã
- Country: Brazil
- State: Rio Grande do Sul
- Time zone: UTC−3 (BRT)

Cotiporã is a municipality in the state of Rio Grande do Sul, Brazil. As of 2020, the estimated population was 3,838.

== Gem robbery ==
A group of attackers forced open the door of a gem factory and put on the run from the police, nine people hostage. The attack took place on Sunday the 30 December 2012 in the village of the state of Rio Grande do Sul. After the attackers had blown open the door to the factory, the officers opened fire. Killing three attackers, some robbers managed to escape and in a nearby bar and a house they took nine people hostage. Among them were two men, six women and an eleven-year-old girl. The nine hostages were found on Sunday night unharmed. The police were on Monday the 31 December still after the fugitive offenders.

== See also ==
- List of municipalities in Rio Grande do Sul
