= Canoas =

Municipality of Rio Grande do Sul, Brazil

- Municipality
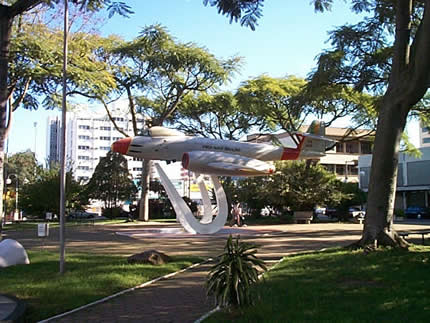
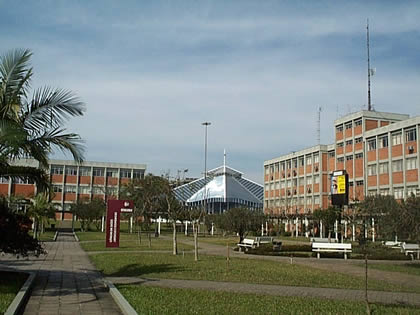
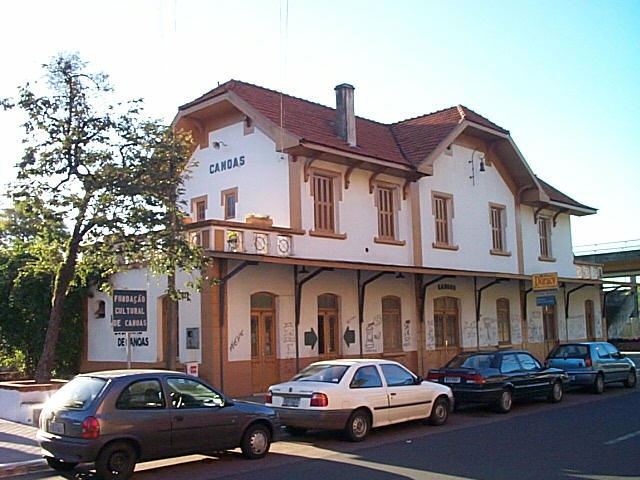
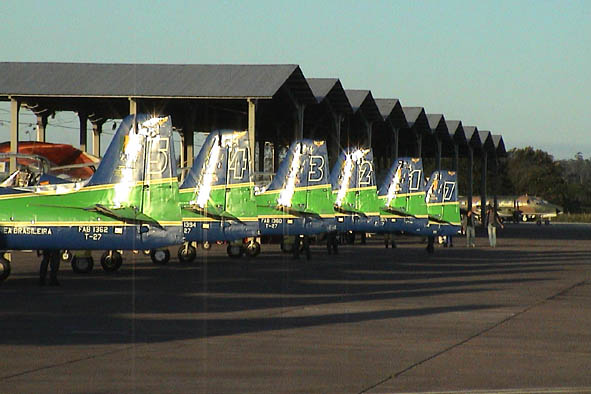
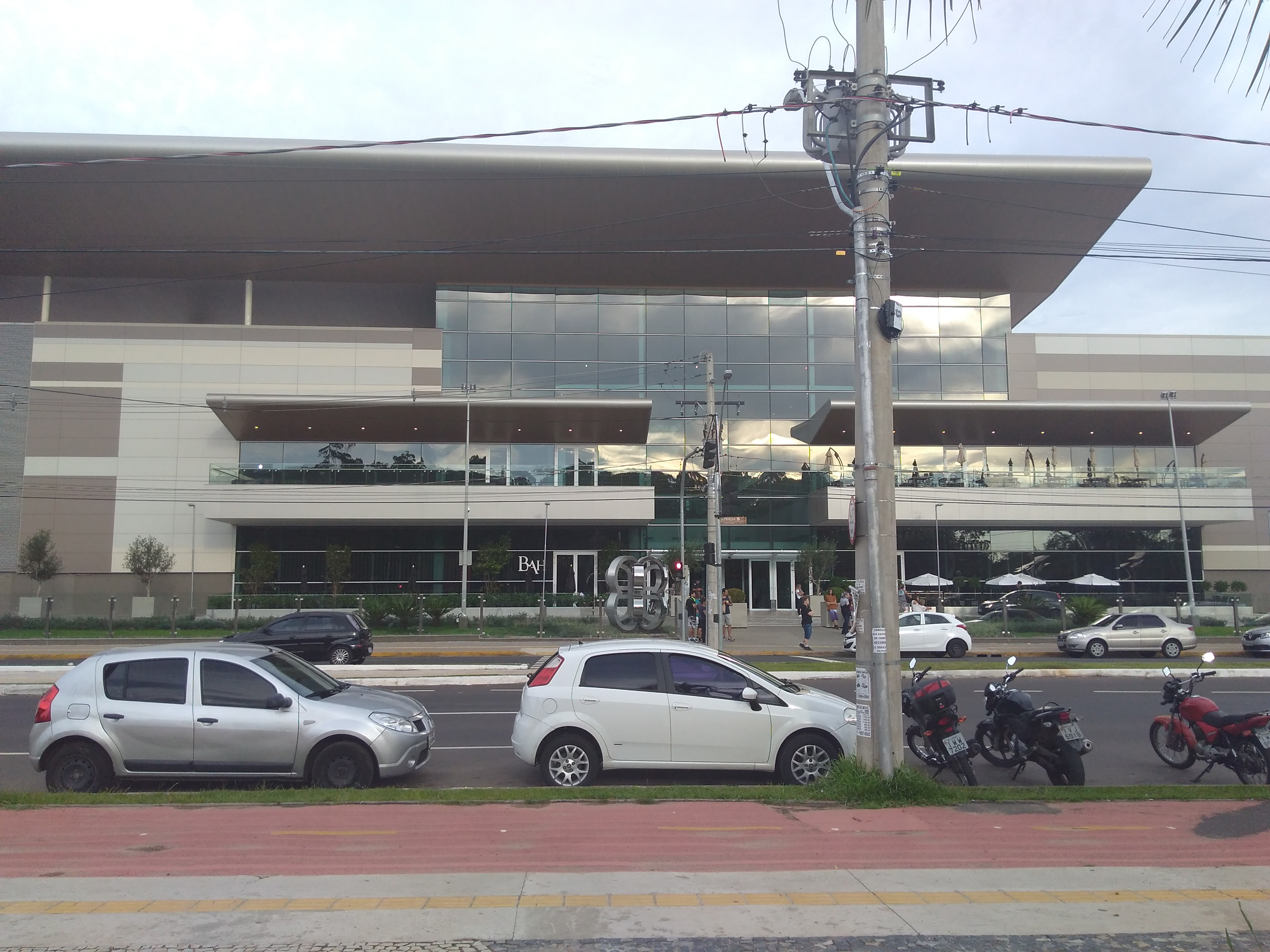
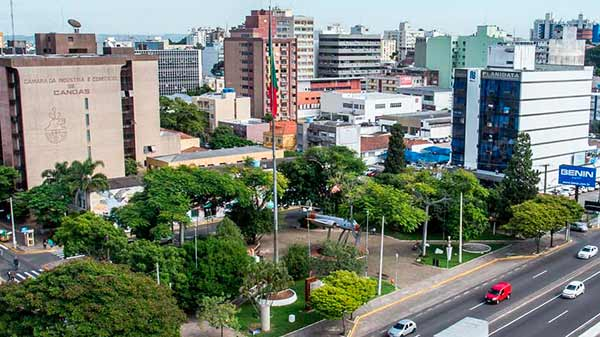
- From top to bottom, left to right: Praça do Avião; Ulbra Campus; Historical Railway Station; Canoas Air Base; ParkShopping Canoas; City Downtown.

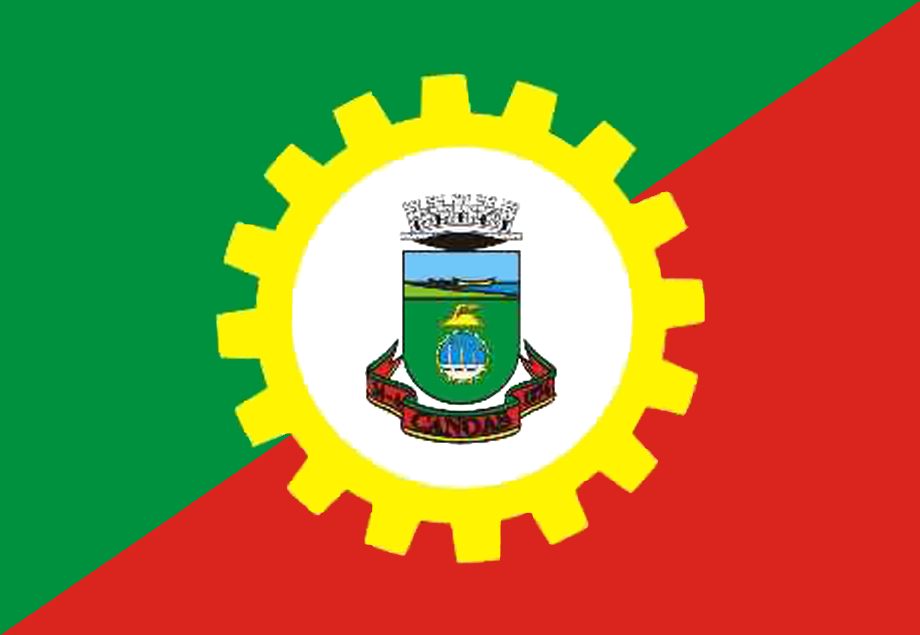
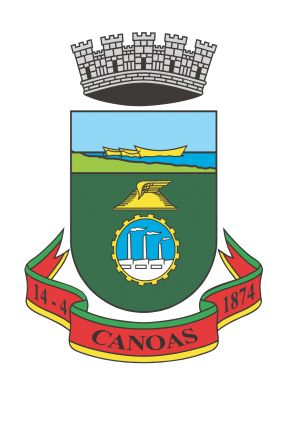
- Flag Coat of arms

- Location in Rio Grande do Sul, Brazil

- Location in Brazil
- Coordinates: 29°55′12″S 51°10′48″W
- Country: Brazil
- Region: South
- State: Rio Grande do Sul
- Established: June 27, 1939

Government
  - Mayor: Airton Jose de Souza

Area
  - Total: 131.097 km^{2} (50.617 sq mi)
- Elevation: 8 m (26 ft)

Population (2022 Brazilian census)
  - Total: 347,657
  - Estimate (2025): 359,840
  - Density: 2,651.91/km^{2} (6,868.41/sq mi)
- Time zone: UTC-3 (BRT)
  - Summer (DST): UTC-2 (BRST)
- Website: canoas.rs.gov.br

Canoas (Portuguese pronunciation: [kaˈnoɐs]) is a municipality in the state of Rio Grande do Sul, Brazil, forming part of the Greater Porto Alegre area. It is the largest municipality of the metropolitan region of Porto Alegre and the third largest municipality of Rio Grande do Sul. Officially declared a city on June 27, 1939, after its separation from São Sebastião do Caí and Gravataí, Canoas derives its name from the historical crafting of canoes in the area. It is the second largest city in the Porto Alegre metropolitan area, with the third-largest population and the third-highest GDP in the state. It is also ranked as the 79th most populous city in Brazil.

Canoas is an industrial and educational hub, drawing residents from surrounding municipalities. It hosts a campus of the Federal Institute of Rio Grande do Sul and several universities including Ulbra, UniRitter, Universidade La Salle, and IPUC. The city is positioned at an elevation of 8 meters (26 ft) above sea level, and is distinguished by the Gravataí and Sinos rivers that traverse its landscape.

== Etymology ==
The city's name, Canoas, which means 'canoes' in Portuguese, traces back to the area's early settlement period during the construction of the railway line from Porto Alegre to São Leopoldo in 1874. A significant local event was the use of a large timbaúva tree (Enterolobium contortisiliquum) for constructing vessels on what was then the Gravataí Farm. This site became known as Capão das Canoas, influencing the names of the railway station and subsequent settlement. The timbaúva tree is also recognized as the city's symbolic tree.

== History ==
The region that is now Canoas was originally inhabited by the Tapes Indigenous peoples until the arrival of Portuguese explorers and settlers in the early 18th century. Francisco Pinto Bandeira, a notable early settler, established the Gravataí Farm in the area by 1733. Over the following decades, the farm was subdivided and sold in smaller plots, leading to increased settlement.

The construction of the railway in 1871 to connect São Leopoldo and Porto Alegre marked a pivotal development for the area. The establishment of a railway station in 1874 catalyzed the growth of the settlement that would become Canoas. The use of local timber for canoe making at the station helped name the area Capão das Canoas.

Significant growth continued into the 20th century with the arrival of the Lasallian brothers in 1908, who founded a school that offered agricultural, primary, and secondary education. The military also played a crucial role in the city's development, particularly with the establishment of the 3rd Military Aviation Regiment in 1937, which was instrumental in advocating for the city's emancipation. Canoas officially became a city in 1939 and continued to expand rapidly, especially from the 1970s onwards, establishing itself as a key economic player in the state.

== Gallery ==
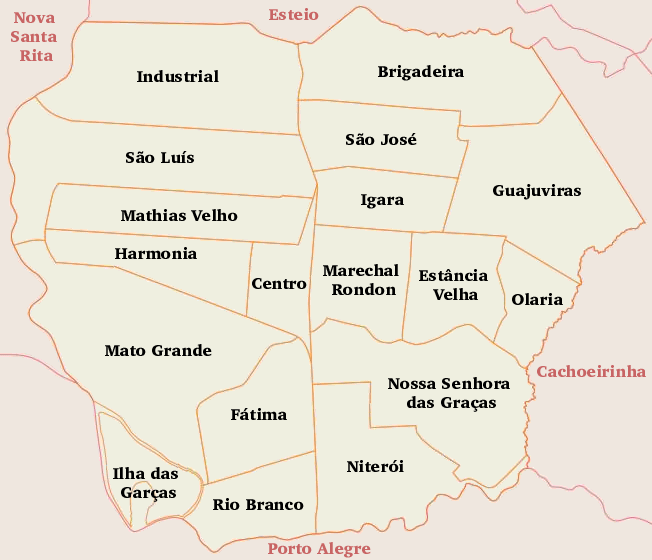
Canoas subdivisions

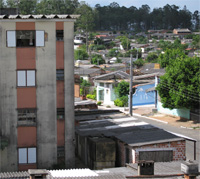
Guajuviras neighbourhood

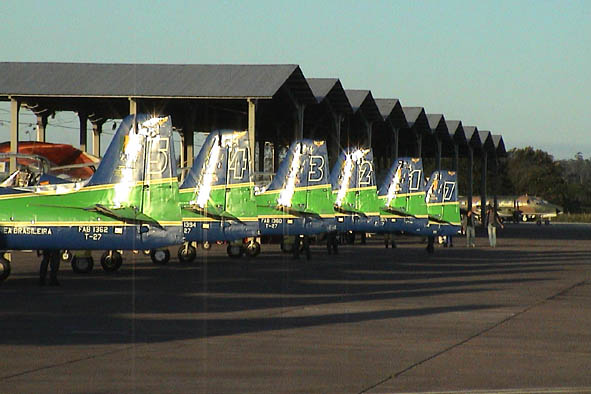
Canoas Air Base

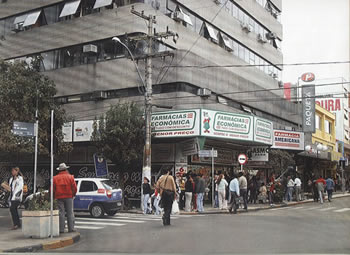
Downtown Canoas

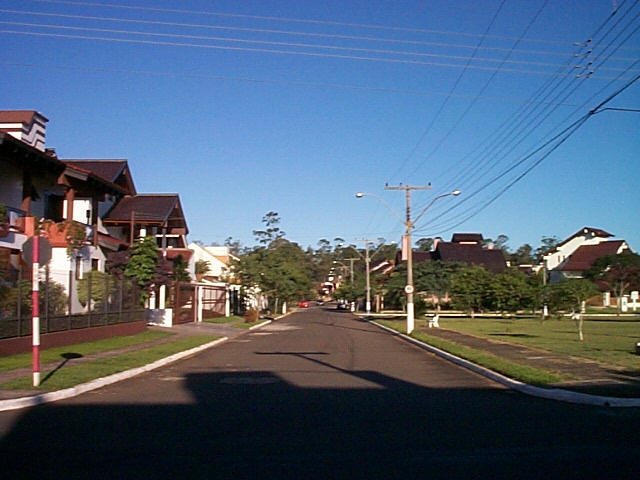
Getulio Vargas neighbourhood

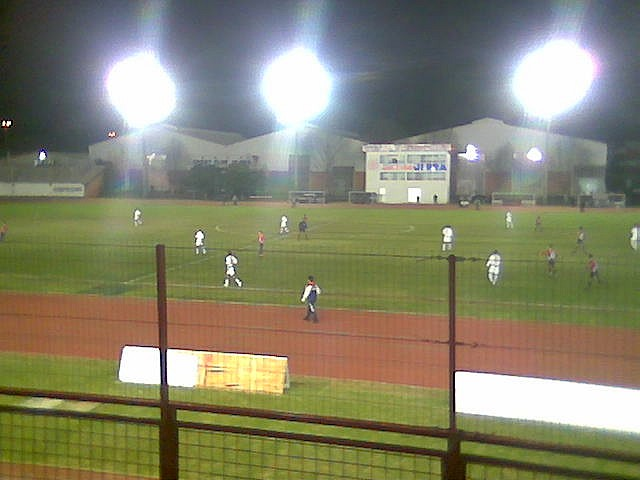
Football game at the Ulbra Sport Club in the São José neighbourhood

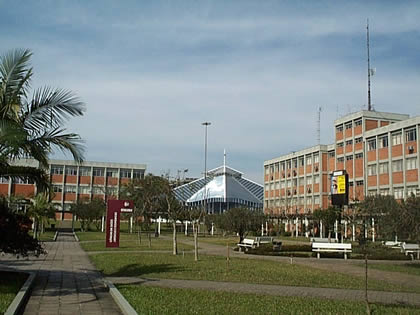
Ulbra University

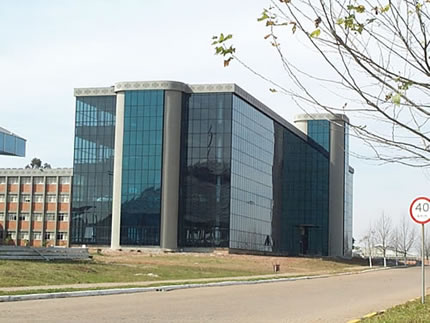
ULBRA Technological Museum

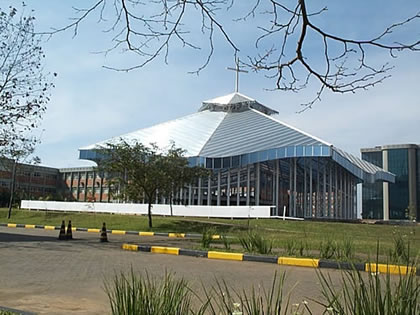
Chapel at the ULBRA

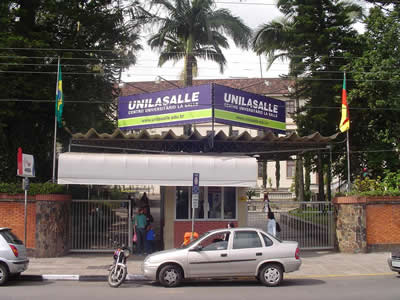
La Salle University

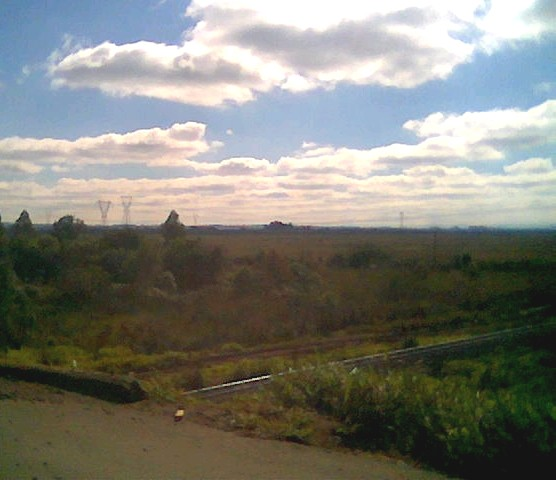
Old rail line in the Industrial neighbourhood

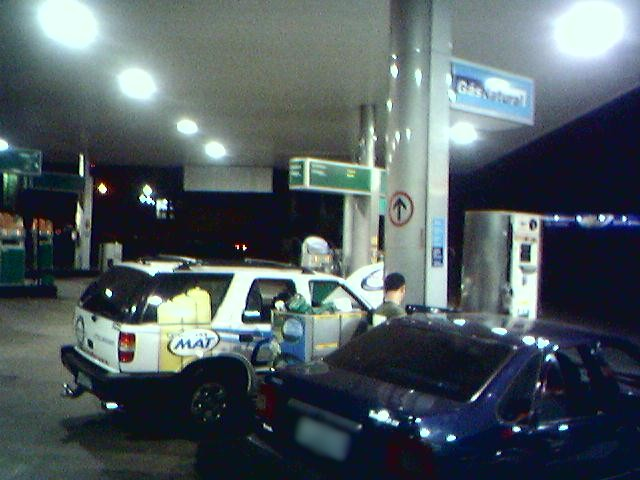
Gas station in the Igara neighbourhood

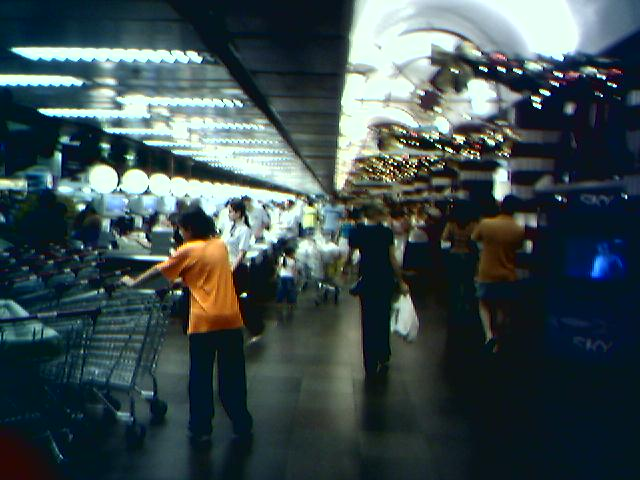
Zaffari Bourbon grocery store in the Getulio Vargas neighbourhood

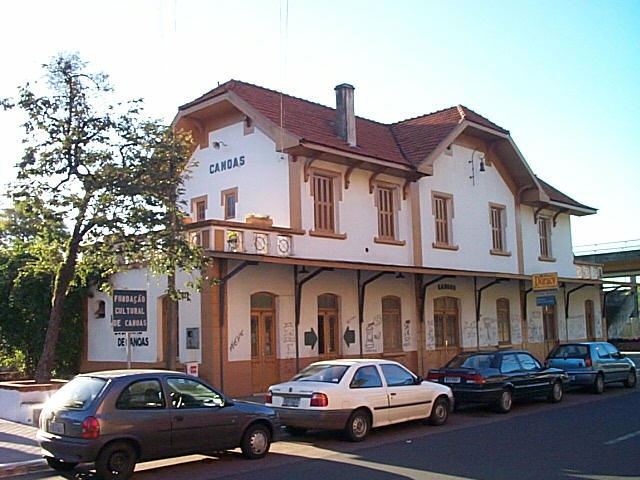
Cultural Foundation of Canoas in the historical train station building

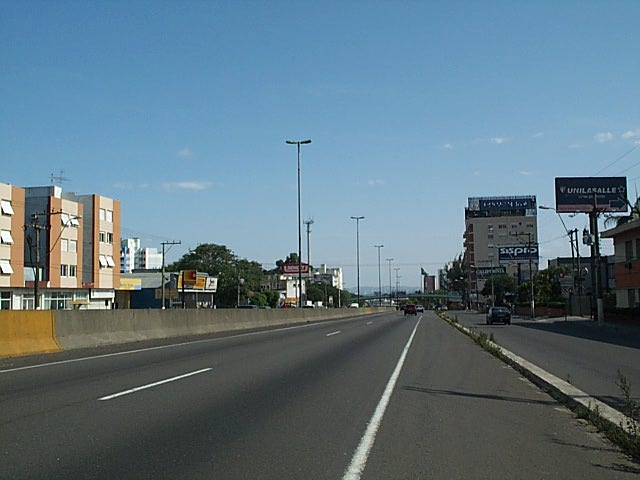
BR-116 Federal Highway in Canoas

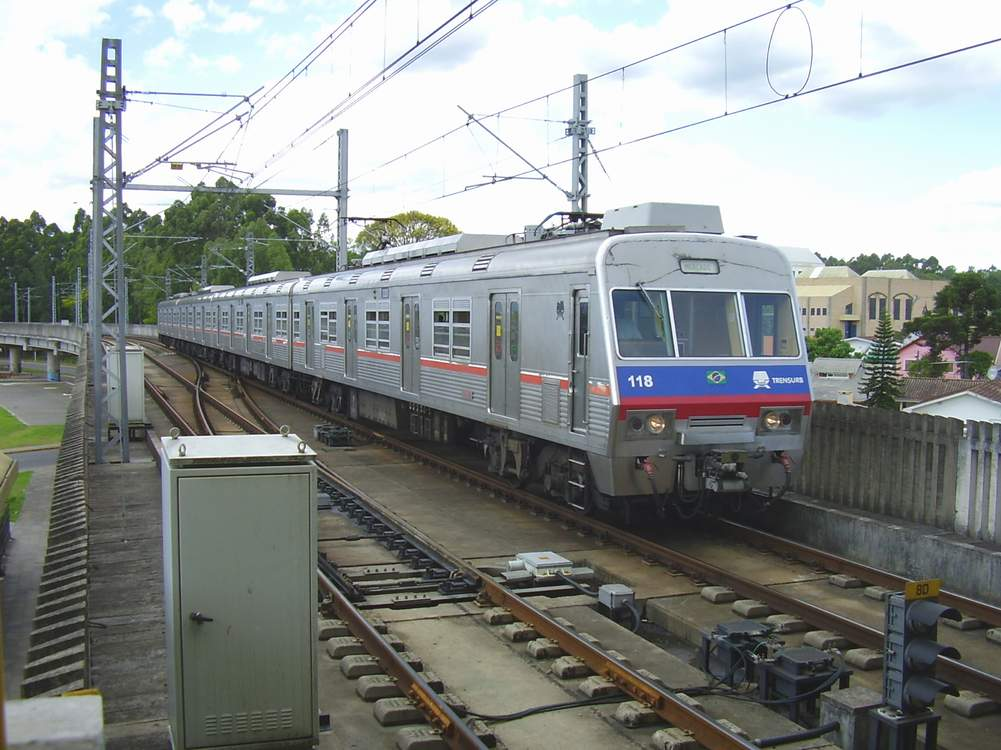
Urban Train that passes through Canoas

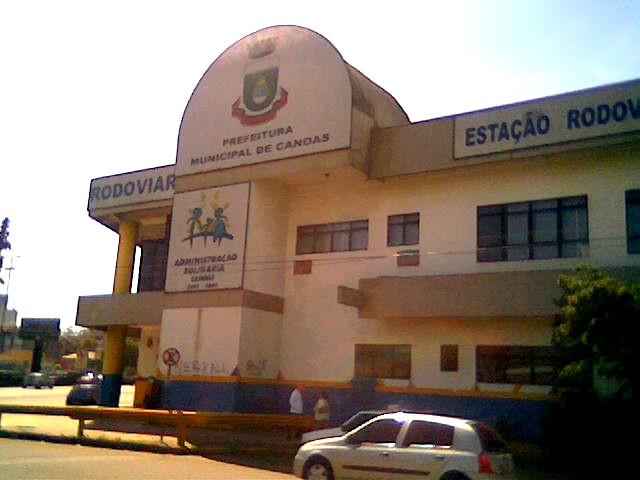
Canoas Intermunicipal Bus Station

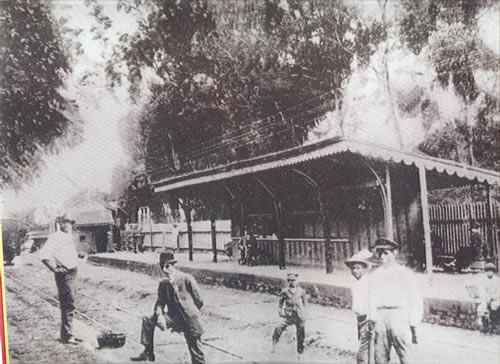
Canoas Train Station in 1874

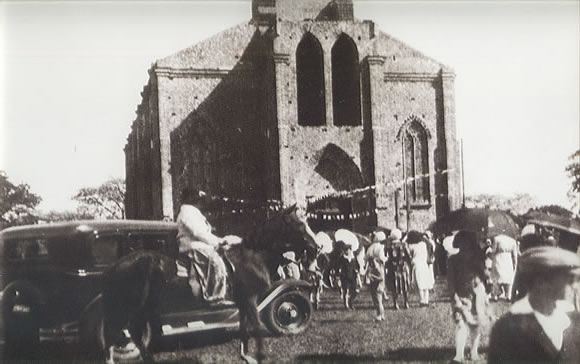
Main Catholic Church, 1931

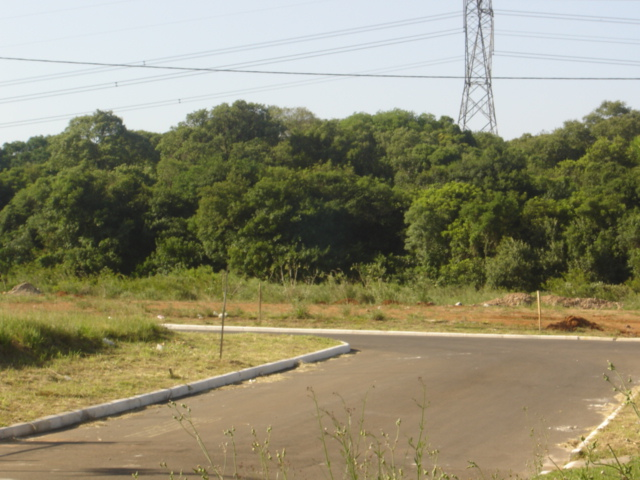
Typical vegetation in Canoas

== See also ==
- List of municipalities in Rio Grande do Sul
- Porto Alegre
- Alvorada
