= Lutheran University of Brazil =

Brazilian private non-profit university

- Universidade Luterana do Brasil
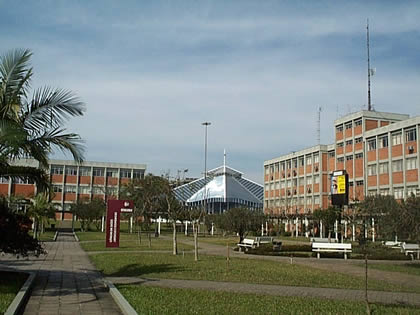
- Other names: ULBRA
- Former names: Canoas Colleges
- Motto: Veritas vos Liberabit
- Motto in English: "The truth will set you free."
- Type: Private non-profit
- Established: August 16, 1972; 53 years ago January 1988 (current name)
- Accreditation: Ministry of Education (Brazil)
- Affiliations: Council of Brazilian University Rectors
- Religious affiliation: Evangelical Lutheran Church of Brazil
- Rector: Marcos Fernando Ziemer
- Academic staff: 2,220
- Students: 60,000 (all campuses)
- Location: Avenida Farroupilha, 8001, Bairro São José, Canoas, RS, 92425-020, Brazil; 29.8872°S 51.1629°W
- Campus: Rio Grande do Sul: Canoas (main campus/rectory); Cachoeira do Sul; Carazinho; Gravataí; Guaíba; Porto Alegre; Santa Maria; São Jerônimo; Torres Rondônia: Porto Velho; Ji-Paraná Amazonas: Manaus Tocantins: Palmas Goiás: Itumbiara Pará: Santarém São Paulo: Sertãozinho
- Language: Portuguese
- Colors: Blue, white and red
- Website: www.ulbra.br

The Lutheran University of Brazil (Portuguese: Universidade Luterana do Brasil or ULBRA) is a university with campuses in several states throughout Brazil.

== History ==
The university has its roots in the parish school of St. Paul's Lutheran Church of Canoas (CELSP), in Canoas, Rio Grande do Sul that was founded in 1911. The first steps towards becoming a university was the creation of the Cristo Redentor College in 1969 under the direction of Reverend Ruben Eugen Becker.

In March 1972, in an effort to expand its offerings in higher education, the Evangelical Lutheran Community of São Paulo founded an administration college with fifty vacancies. In 1974, the Federal Council of Education authorized the operation of the Canoas Colleges.

In January 1988, the president of Brazil, José Sarney, allowed the creation of the Lutheran University of Brazil.

== Campuses ==
The university's headquarters is located in the city of Canoas, in the state of Rio Grande do Sul (the southernmost province of Brazil). Within this state, Ulbra also has campuses in the cities of Cachoeira do Sul, Carazinho, Gravataí, Guaíba, Porto Alegre, Santa Maria, São Jerônimo and Torres. Apart from these cities, the university also has campuses in the states of Amazonas (Manaus), Goiás (Itumbiara), Pará (Santarém), Rondônia (Ji-Paraná and Porto Velho), Tocantins (Palmas) and in the state of São Paulo.

== Academics ==
ULBRA offers several majors, including medicine, which the university became entitled to offer after building its hospital, located within the university premises and currently serving the community of Canoas and neighbouring cities.

== Athletics ==
The university has a football team that plays in the first division of the Campeonato Gaúcho, as well as having teams participate in many sports tournaments, including volleyball, basketball, judo, and athletics. As of 2007, Sport Club Ulbra have contested the Campeonato Brasileiro Third Division for the fourth time in a row, but have not been successful in their attempts towards promotion.

== Automobile museum ==
The school previously maintained a large museum of technology that had a collection of more than 200 vehicles from a Ford Model T to a 2000 Chevrolet Corvette and included the formula racing car driven by Emerson Fittipaldi when he won the Indianapolis 500 along with that race's pace car. In 2009, due to the institution's financial problems, the museum was closed and the collection auctioned. Currently, the Museum of Technology building houses the studios of Ulbra TV (a local educational TV station affiliated with TV Cultura), and Radio Mix FM 107.1.
