= Guaíba (water body) =

- Guaíba
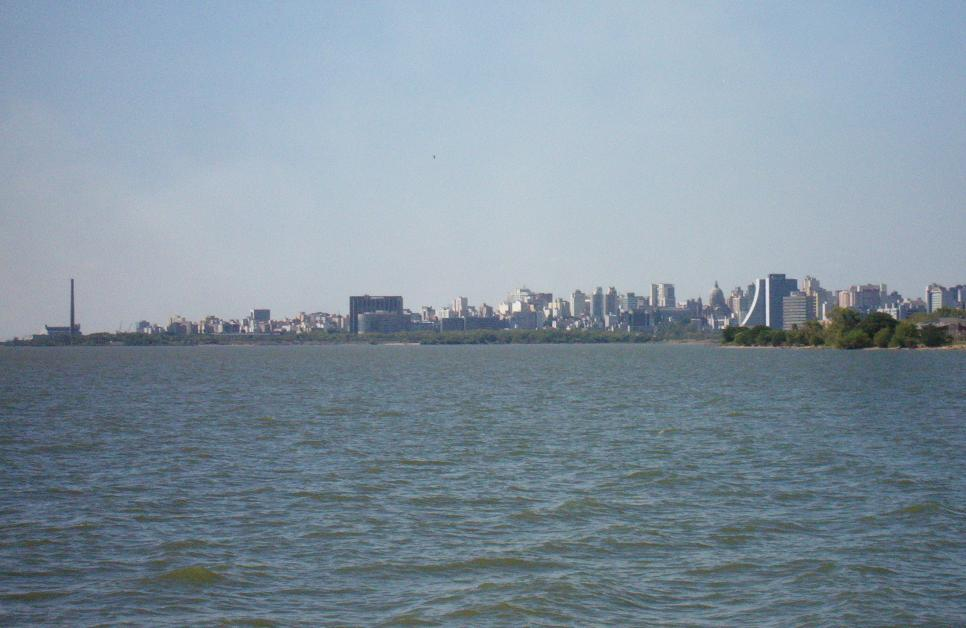
- Guaíba with Porto Alegre in the background

- Location within Brazil
- Location: Rio Grande do Sul, Brazil
- Coordinates: 30.2167°S 51.2333°W
- Type: Lake or river
- Settlements: Porto Alegre

Guaíba (Portuguese pronunciation: [ɡwaˈibɐ]) is a major water body in Rio Grande do Sul, the southernmost state of Brazil. It is commonly referred to either as a "river" (Portuguese: Rio Guaíba) or as a "lake" (Lago Guaíba). The Jacuí River, the Sinos River, the Gravataí River and the Caí River empty into Guaíba from the north, which in turn empties into the Lagoa dos Patos, the largest lagoon in South America further down south. The body of water covers 496 square kilometres (192 sq mi) in total.

Both Porto Alegre, the capital and most populous city of Rio Grande do Sul, and Viamão lie on its eastern shore. The cities of Guaíba, Eldorado do Sul and Barra do Ribeiro lie opposite to Porto Alegre, on the western shore. Guaíba is navigable, and is connected to the Atlantic Ocean through Lagoa dos Patos and its outlet channel, located further south, near the city of Rio Grande. A major flood occurred in 2024.

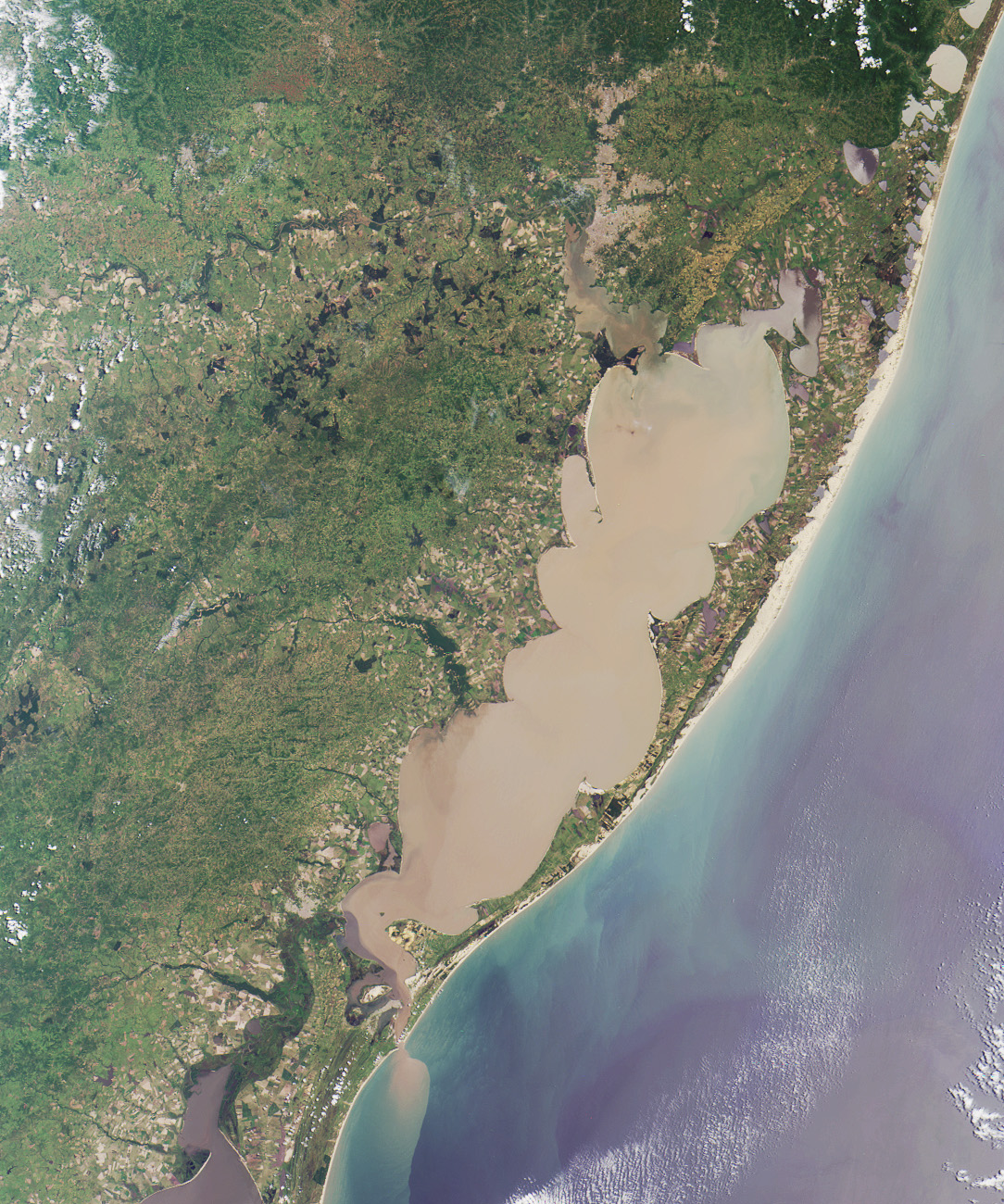
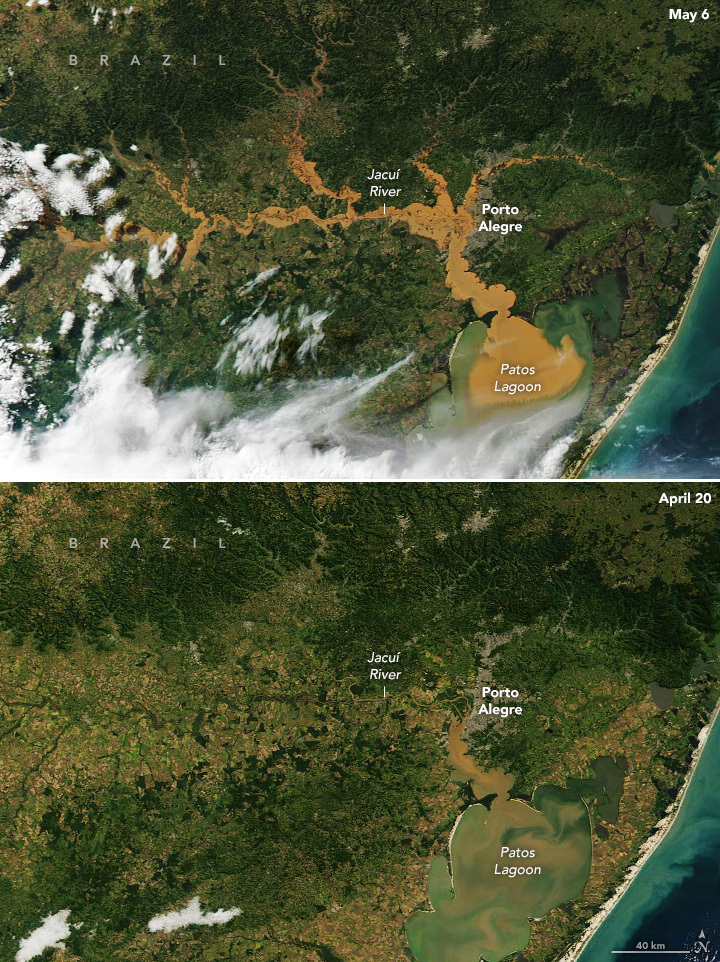
Left: Guaíba is the darker body of water to the upper left of Lagoa dos Patos;
Right: satellite images of the affected areas from the 2024 Rio Grande do Sul floods, during and before.
