= History of Rio Grande do Sul =

Pre-historic to modern history of Rio Grande do Sul

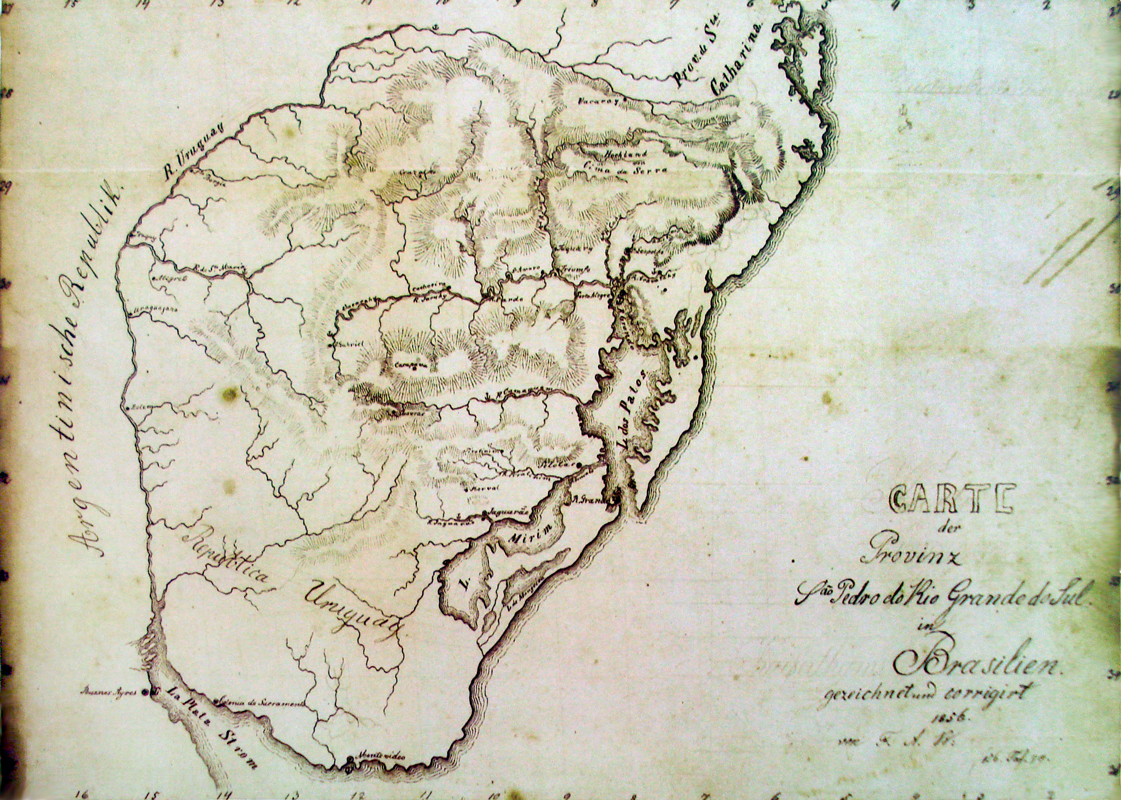
Herrmann Rudolf Wendroth: Map of the province of São Pedro do Rio Grande do Sul in 1852.

The history of Rio Grande do Sul begins with the arrival of humans in the region, around 12,000 years ago. Its most dramatic changes, however, occurred in the last five centuries, after the colonisation of Brazil. This most recent period took place amid several external and internal armed conflicts, some of which with great violence.

== Overview ==
Guilhermino César mentioned that the history of the state "is one of the most recent chapters in Brazilian history" because when polyphonic masses were already being sung in the Northeast, Rio Grande do Sul was still occupied by a handful of Portuguese villages and cattle estancias. The south-southeast was a "no man's land" where Spanish troops sent by Buenos Aires often marched, defending the interests of the Spanish Crown, the legal owner of the area at that time. Essentially, Rio Grande do Sul, until the end of the 18th century, was a virgin region inhabited by indigenous peoples. The only relevant signs of European civilization and culture in the entire territory until this time were a group of Jesuit reductions founded in the northwest, most notably the Sete Povos das Missões. However, being of Spanish creation, until recently the Missions were seen as a chapter apart from the state's history. But in recent years they have been assimilated into the integrated historiography of the state.

In the first half of the 19th century, after many conflicts and treaties, when Portugal obtained definitive possession of the lands that today make up the state, expelled the Spanish, dismantled the reductions, and massacred or dispersed the Indians, a society with a Portuguese matrix was established and an economy based mainly on charque and wheat began, leading to a cultural flourishing in the biggest centers of the coast - Porto Alegre, Pelotas, and Rio Grande. This growth relied on the contribution of many German immigrants (who cleared new areas and created a significant regional culture and prosperous economies) as well as on slavery. In 1835, began a dramatic conflict that involved the gauchos in a fratricidal war, the Ragamuffin War, with a separatist and republican character. After the war, society was able to restructure itself.

At the end of the century, trade grew stronger, immigrants of other origins such as Italians and Jews arrived, and at the turn of the 20th century, Rio Grande do Sul had become the third largest economy in Brazil, with a growing industry and a rich bourgeois class. However, it was still a state divided by serious political rivalries, and there were more bloody crises. At this time Positivism was outlining the government program, creating a dynasty of politicians inherited from Júlio de Castilhos that ruled until the 1960s and influenced all of Brazil, especially Getúlio Vargas, who in his origin was a castilhista. During the period of the military dictatorship, Rio Grande do Sul faced many difficulties with freedom of expression, as did the whole country, but the economic growth of the Brazilian Miracle provided for investments in infrastructure. By the end of the cycle, however, the state had accumulated enormous public debt.

In the last decades, the state has been consolidating a dynamic and diversified economy, although linked to the agricultural sector, and has gained a reputation as having a politicized and educated population. Even though there are many challenges to be overcome and great regional differences, in general, the state has improved its quality of life reaching indexes higher than the national average, has projected itself culturally throughout Brazil, and has begun a process of opening to other scenarios in the face of globalization, while it has started to pay more attention to its historical roots, its internal diversity, the minorities, and its environment.

== Prehistory ==
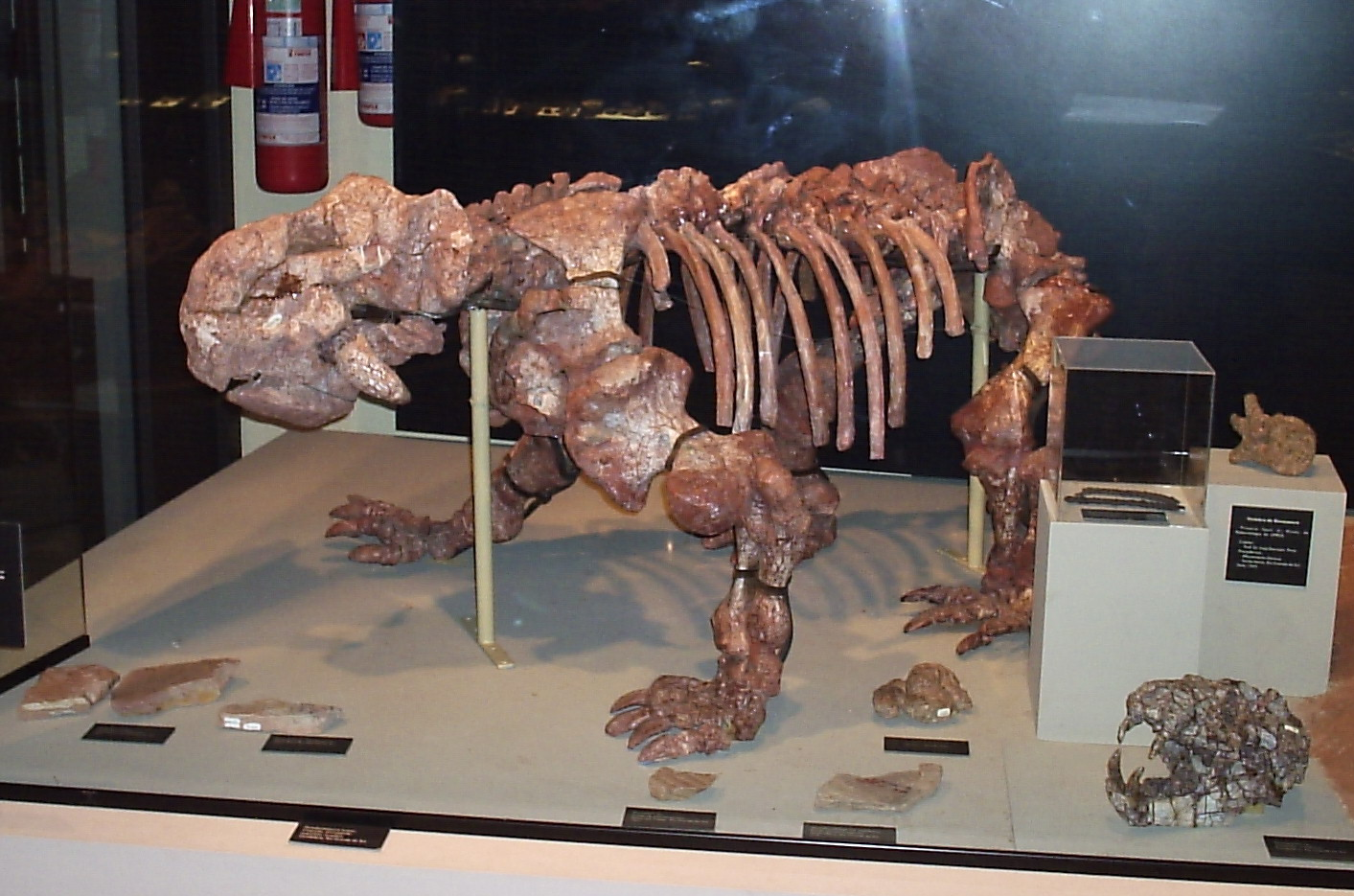
Dinodontosaurus fossil, Collection of UFRGS.

The geographical profile of Rio Grande do Sul was formed by successive transformations that began about 600 million years ago. This territory was once a sea, it was once a desert, and in several regions massive burial by lava flows took place. It is believed that it was only two million years ago that the geography was more or less defined as it is known today, when the sandy strip of coastline was fixed.

About 12,000 years before the present began human occupation, with the arrival of hunter-gatherer groups from the north. The prevailing thesis is that they originally crossed the Bering Strait in far northern North America, which was then dry because of global glaciation, and then migrated southward, occupying many spaces along this route over generations.

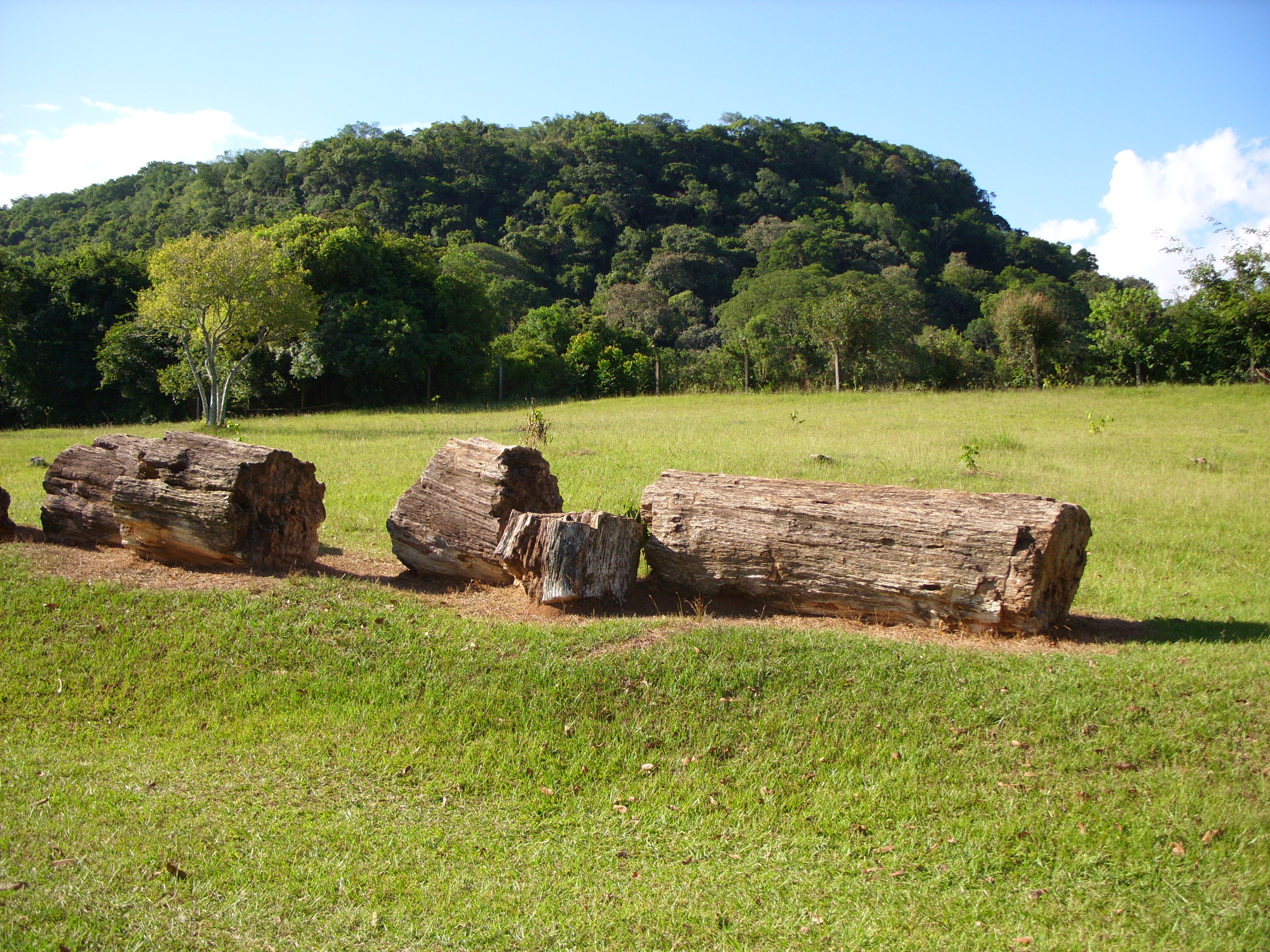
Petrified tree in the Paleobotanical Garden of Mata.

The first to arrive in the territory of Rio Grande do Sul found a region different from the one seen today. At 12,000 years BP, the glaciation that had covered all of Patagonia with ice and cooled the global climate, was beginning to recede, and the region's climate, drier and colder than at present, was warming and moistening. However, snow likely still fell in the region every winter. The sea level was rising, as it melted the glacial ice that had accumulated on the world, and flooded the coastal plain. The local vegetation was likely sparse, consisting mainly of savannah, with forests only on the highlands and riverbanks. The local fauna was also different, consisting of many giant species, such as the mylodons, glyptodons, and toxodons.

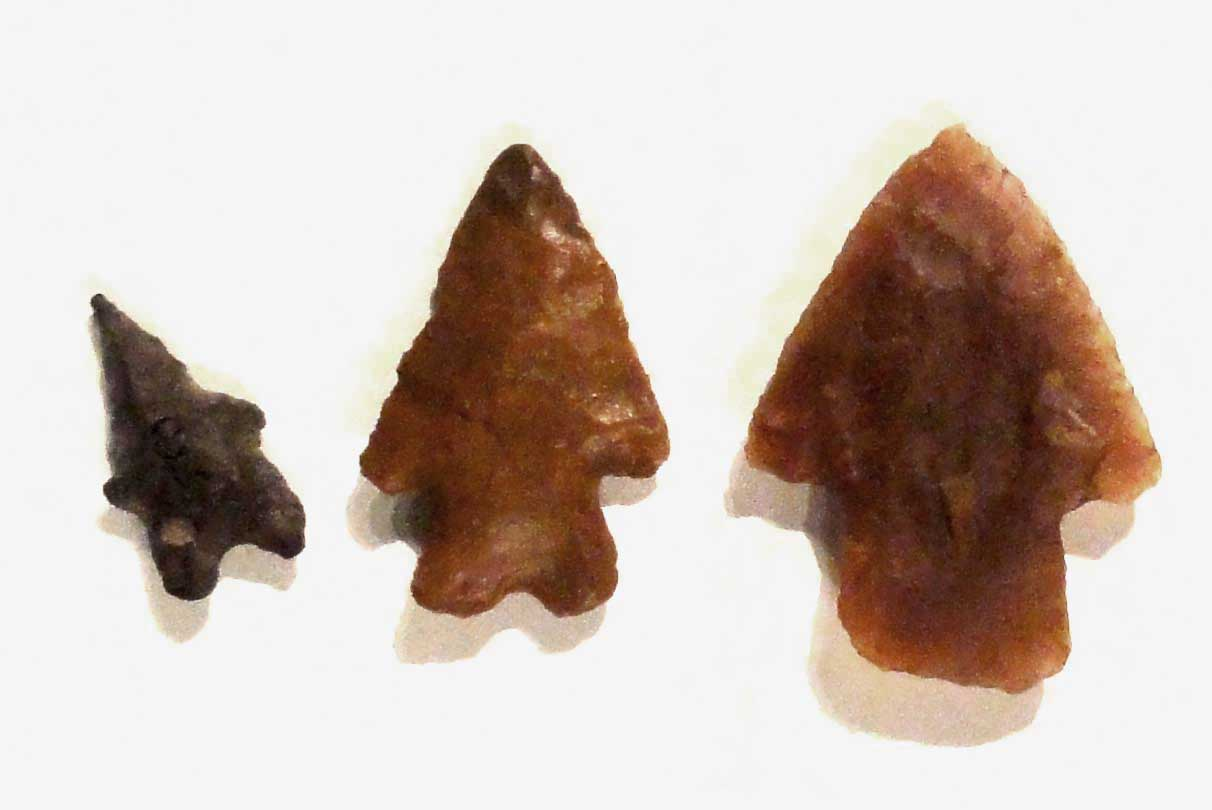
Chipped stone arrowheads from the Umbu tradition. UFRGS Museum.

Human settling occurred through the western border, along the Uruguay River, where the state today borders Argentina and Uruguay. The Alegrete municipality, located in this area, on the banks of the Ibicuí River, is the oldest archaeological site with human remains in the state, dating at 12,770 years old. These first peoples, who shared the same material culture, known as the Umbu tradition, lived by hunting and gathering in the plains of the pampa, among its open fields and riparian forests. They were nomadic and likely established temporary camps according to the seasonal abundance of certain natural resources, following animal migration routes or ripening seasons for edible vegetables.

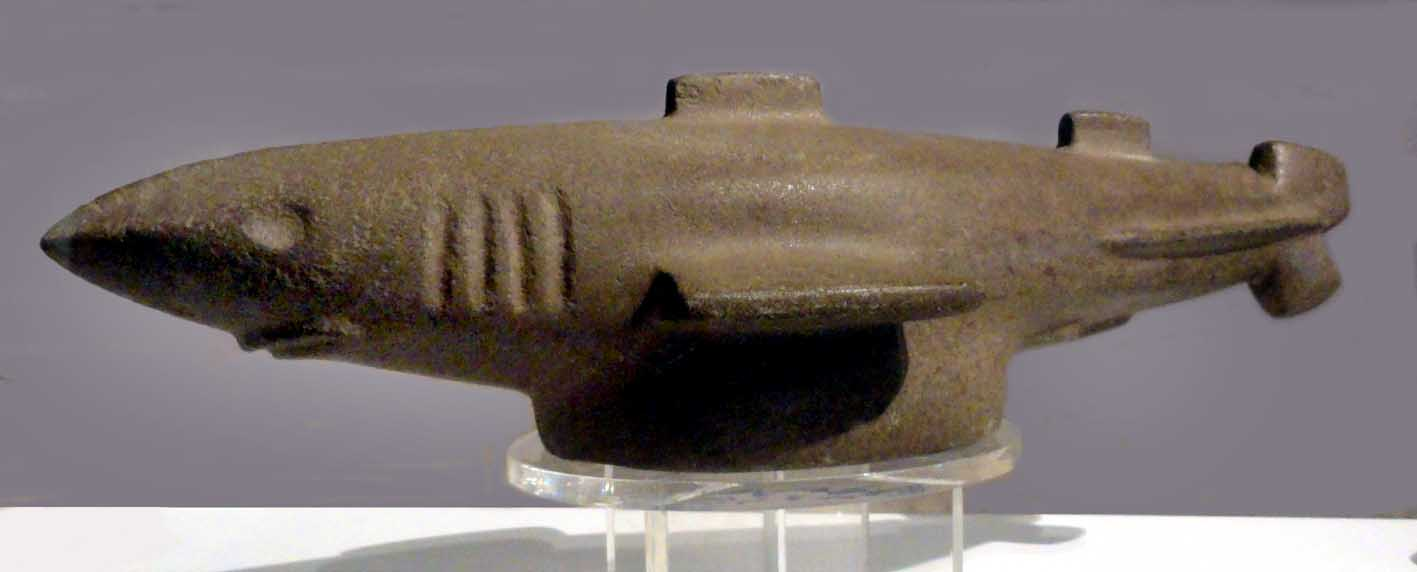
Stone sculpture of the Sambaqui tradition, representing a shark, Laboratory for Teaching and Research in Anthropology and Archeology of the Federal University of Pelotas (LEPAARQ-UFPEL)

They left relatively poor records. Archaeological sites include remains of settlements, food scraps such as animal bones and seeds, as well as personal adornments and lithic artifacts such as chipped stone arrowheads and spears, bolas, cutters, scrapers, and other tools. Their culture predominated for about 11,000 years, although it exhibited regional adaptations to the varied scenery of the territory, which is composed of different types of ecosystems. The climatic changes that the region went through over the millennia determined important modifications in the composition of the flora and fauna, to which the human populations had to adapt, and this was reflected in variations in their customs and cultures. During the climatic optimum, a period of a significant rise in global temperatures that occurred from 6 thousand years B.C. onwards, these peoples began to colonize the forests of the sierras and to climb the plateau. Rock engravings and tools adapted to woodworking appear, especially bifacial axes. The so-called Humaitá tradition was formed there.

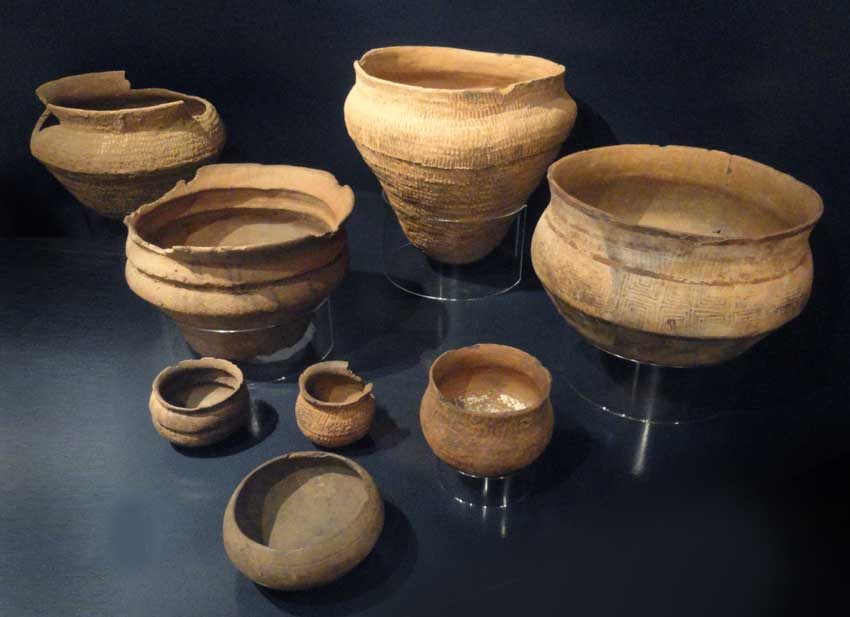
Guarani ceramics. UFRGS Museum.

Meanwhile, the conquest of the coast was being completed, forming a specific culture, the Sambaqui tradition, adapted to life by the sea and in the coastal plains. Characteristics of this tradition are the deposits of shells, crustacean shells, and fish remains that gave it its name, where one can also find burials and artifacts indicative of its association with the sea, such as hooks and net weights. There is also evidence of rudimentary agricultural practices, suggesting that they were sedentary, for at least part of the year. Other distinguishing features are the settlements on low artificial hills, known as cerritos, formed in floodplain areas of the coastal plain.

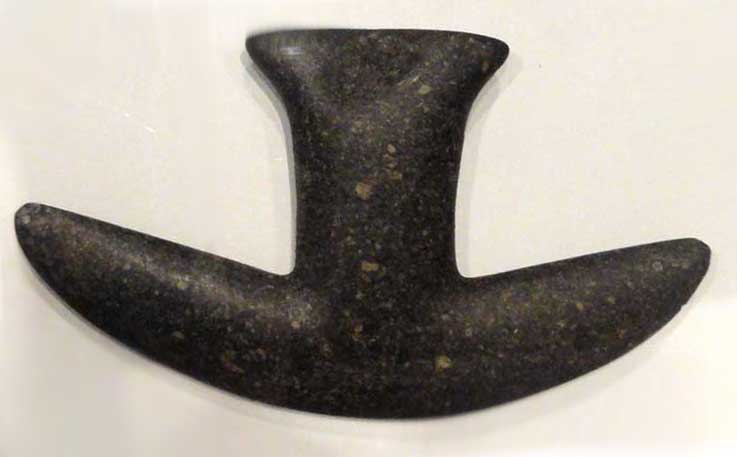
Jê people polished stone axe. UFRGS Museum.

Around 3,000 years BP, the climate cooled again and stabilized in a condition similar to the present one, producing new adaptations in the wildlife and human cultures that flourished. In the highlands and the plateau, where the climate remained relatively cold, with frequent snowfalls and frosts, the peoples of the Humaitá tradition, who colonized the area during the climatic optimum, needed to adapt, and then typical straw-covered underground shelters appeared, which could be organized into villages with several units.

Sometime later, coinciding with the beginning of the Christian era, the second great human wave arrives in the region, composed of Guaraní indigenous people from the Amazon. It is thought that they, too, may have been driven to migration by global climate change. They had a developed agricultural culture, domesticated animals, and mastered the technique of terracotta and polished stone. They colonized the forested valleys of the central depression, the coast, and part of the sierras, but avoided the higher and colder regions, and made little headway into the pampas, as they preferred warmer climates and the forested environment to which they were accustomed in the north. Their sites are distinguished from other traditions by the form of the settlements, in more stable and structured villages, and by the abundance of polished stone artifacts such as arrowheads, axes, macerators, and ceramic vessels of different shapes and decoration, techniques that are now observed to appear in the sites of other groups. Their influence also showed in the expansion of agriculture.

Another group to descend from the north along with the Guaranís were the Jês, of similarly developed culture, leaving a greater mark on the plateau, where they first influenced the peoples of the Humaitá tradition and soon supplanted them. But by the time Brazil was "discovered" in 1500, almost all of the state's Indians, who numbered 100,000 to 150,000 by scholarly estimate, were Guaranís or mixed with them. The groups least affected by this invasion were the Jês of the middle plateau, and the Charrúas and Minuanos, of the pampas.

== The beginning of European colonization ==
The territory that today constitutes Rio Grande do Sul already appeared on Portuguese maps, under the name of Capitania d'El-Rei, since the 16th century. Despite the Treaty of Tordesillas, which defined the end of the Portuguese lands at Laguna, Portugal was eager to extend its dominions to the mouth of the Rio da Prata. In the 17th century, bandeirantes from São Paulo began to roam the area in search of treasure and to enslave Indians. In this spirit, ignoring the treaties, on July 17, 1676, through a Royal Charter, Portugal delimited two captaincies in the south which together extended from Laguna to the Rio da Prata, donated to the Viscount of Asseca and João Correia de Sá. On November 22, 1676, the papal bull Romani Pontificis Pastoralis Solicitudo strengthened the Portuguese pretensions because by creating the bishopric of Rio de Janeiro, it established as its limits the coast and hinterland of the captaincy of Espírito Santo to the Rio da Prata. Soon after, the Portuguese Crown began to consider the occupation of the southern lands, legally Spanish.

=== Coastal occupation ===
The first expedition of conquest, organized in 1677, failed. Another, in 1680, under the command of Dom Manuel Lobo, managed to reach the Prata in January of the following year, founding the Colônia do Sacramento, with a prison and the first shelters for the colonists. Spain, at this time weakened by wars against France, despite attacking the colony, did not outline a more serious reaction to the Portuguese expansion and, in 1681, the Provisional Treaty was established, delimiting new borders in the region and recognizing Portuguese sovereignty over the left bank of the Rio de la Plata.

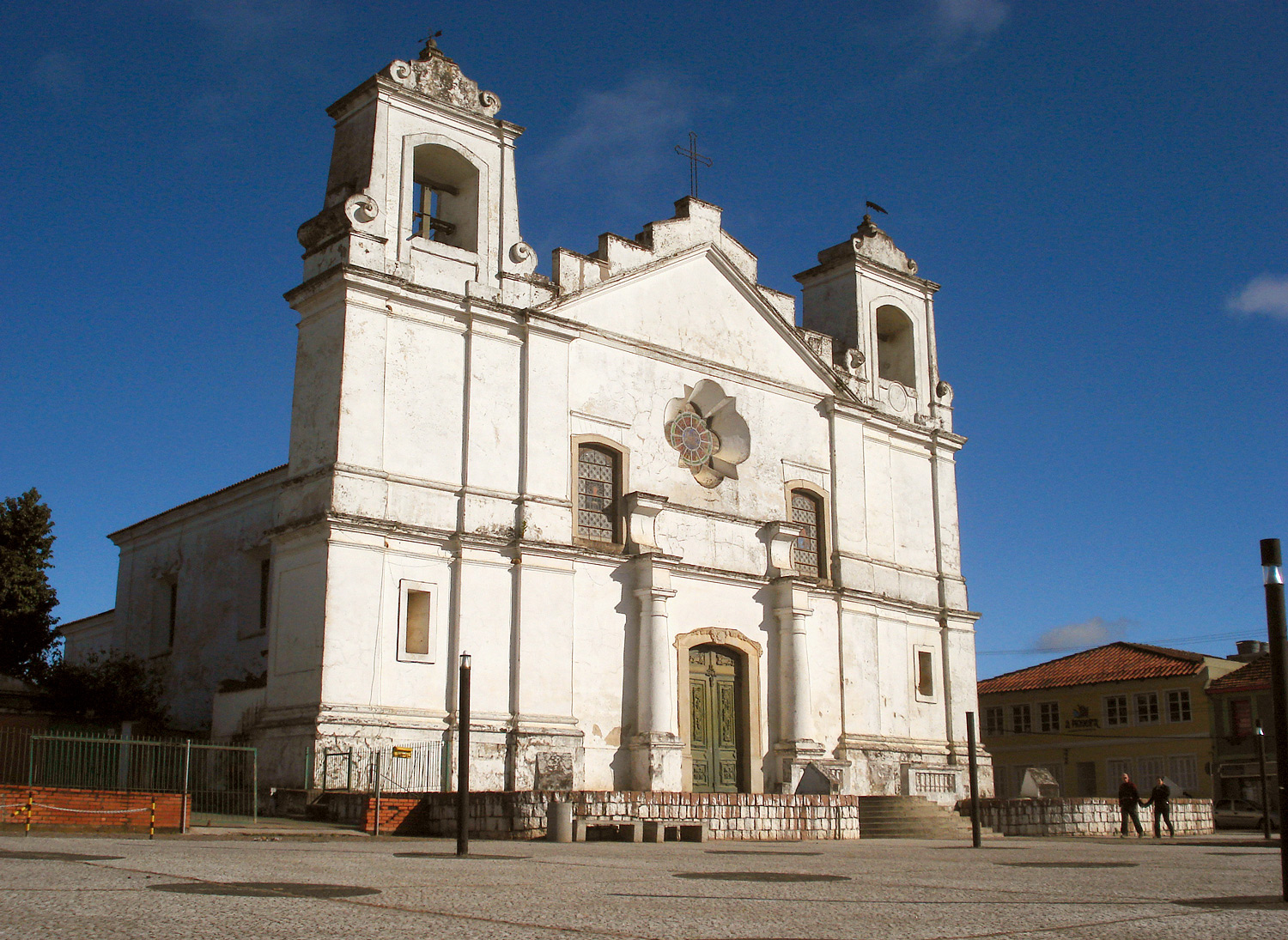
Mother Church of Viamão ("Matriz de Viamão") (1766 - 1769), one of the oldest churches in the state.

With the incentive of the establishment of this outpost, the Portuguese became interested in occupying the intermediate lands between the Sacramento and the captaincy of São Vicente. General João Borges Fortes, in his work "Rio Grande de São Pedro", observed that the bandeirante Francisco de Brito Peixoto was the pioneer in the occupation of the lands between Laguna and Colônia do Sacramento, beginning the Portuguese-Brazilian presence in Rio Grande do Sul:

When studying the settlement process of Rio Grande do Sul, the first character one comes across is that of Francisco de Brito Peixoto, who was the pioneer of the peaceful conquest of the lands between Laguna and Colônia do Sacramento, along the coastline. Founder, with his father, Domingos de Brito Peixoto, of the Laguna settlement, Francisco took his adventures and discoveries into the territory [...] in search of gold or silver deposits, either going down to the South, to the great La Plata estuary, capturing cattle and horses, perusing in these ventures lands that, under the domination of the Indians and Jesuits, belonged in fact to the Castilian sovereignty. If this sovereignty was exercised in fact, it was not recognized in law by the Portuguese court that claimed for Portugal, with the existence of the Colonia del Sacramento, the lordly domain of the northern bank of the River Plate.

From there, settlers coming from Laguna headed to Rio Grande, occupying the regions of Viamão. In 1732, the first sesmarias (abandoned land belonging to Portugal and handed over for occupation) were granted, and in 1737, a Portuguese military expedition, commanded by Brigadier José da Silva Pais, was charged with helping the colony, taking Montevideo and building a fort in Maldonado. After the failure of the latter, the brigadier decided to settle further north, free of the constant disputes between the Portuguese and the Spanish. Therefore, he sailed to the shore of Lagoa dos Patos, mistaken for the Rio Grande river, and arriving there on February 19, 1737, founded a prison and built the Fort Jesus, Mary, and Joseph, constituting the origin of the city of Rio Grande, the first center of government in the region. The location was a strategic point for the defense of the territory, being halfway between Laguna and Colônia do Sacramento.

The first settler families would arrive later that year, but the stretch between Rio Grande, Tramandaí and the fields of the Vacaria region, in the northeastern highlands, were also being settled independently, a situation made easier by the extension, by the tropeiros, of the Estrada Real Road from São Paulo to the Campos de Viamão. As early as 1734, there were already large cattle ranches in the area, the seeds of the first settlements were being sown and the ranchers began to request the granting of sesmarias. As of 1748, Azorean families, sent by the Portuguese Crown to colonize the state, began to arrive. They first settled in Rio Grande, and later others settled in the region of the future Porto Alegre, then still a small settlement built near the port of Viamão. From there, other groups advanced through the valleys of the Taquari and Jacuí rivers.

=== First European occupation of the countryside ===
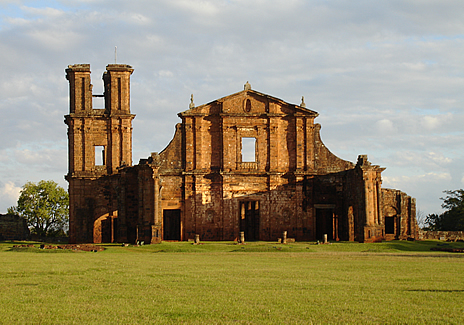
Ruins of São Miguel das Missões, today a World Heritage Site.

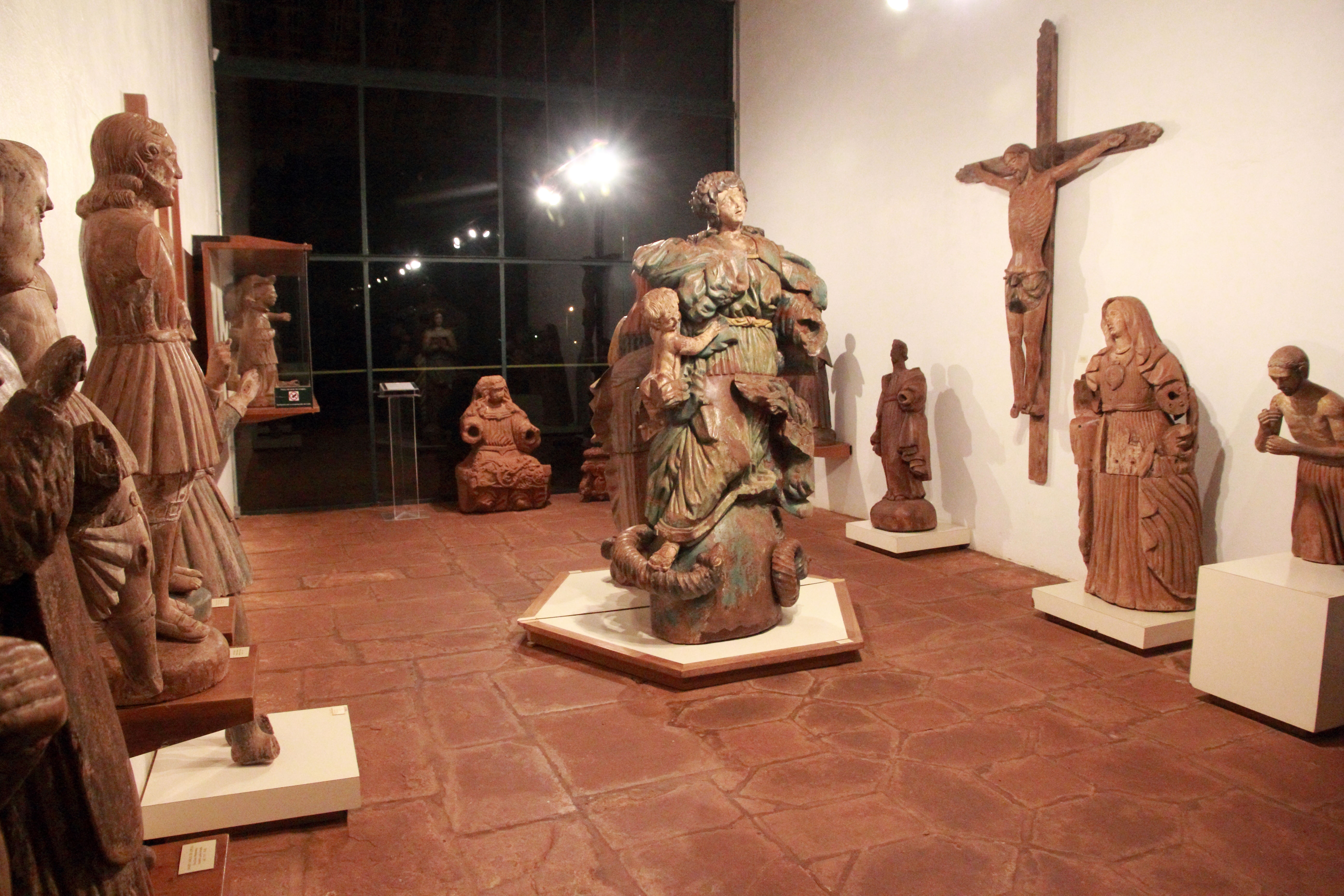
Missionary statuary collection at the Missions Museum.

Meanwhile, in the northwestern part of the state, the Spanish Jesuits, linked to the Jesuit Province of Paraguay, had established, since 1626, numerous highly organized villages, gathering a large indigenous population: The reductions, founded in the northwestern region near the Uruguay River and penetrating the central depression almost as far as Porto Alegre. Seven of them would come to be known as the Seven Peoples of the Missions, whose extraordinary flourishing included refined expressions of art in the European mold. The priests built a civilization apart from the conflicts that agitated the coast and left many records about the indigenous peoples, the geography, the fauna, and flora of the region, but their missions were eventually forgotten, and their most direct contribution to the history of the Portuguese state was summarized in the introduction of cattle, the development of herding techniques that would later be assimilated by the Portuguese, and the creation of their own mythology about the missionary culture, which today is gaining increasing prestige in the official discourse. They also left an extensive sculptural and architectural legacy, which if it were not for the looting and depredations it suffered in the 19th century, would be much larger and better preserved, documenting the opulence of their churches and the sophistication of the villages.

In the 18th century, a new agreement between the Iberian crowns, the Treaty of Madrid, would once again change the borders. This treaty signed on January 13, 1750, established the exchange of the Colônia do Sacramento for the Seven Peoples, whose indigenous populations would be transferred to the Spanish area beyond the Uruguay River. The demarcation of the new borders and the change of the villages did not go without difficulties. The Jesuits and the Indians protested, confrontation was expected, and the Marquis of Pombal ordered the Portuguese Legate, Captain-general Gomes Freire de Andrade, not to hand over Sacramento without first receiving the Sete Povos. The situation worsened and the expected conflict broke out in Rio Pardo, giving rise to the so-called Guaraní War, which would decimate a large number of Indians and dissolve the Missions. In the episode emerged the legendary figure of the indigenous leader Sepé Tiaraju, today considered a hero of the state and a martyr to the cause of the Indians.

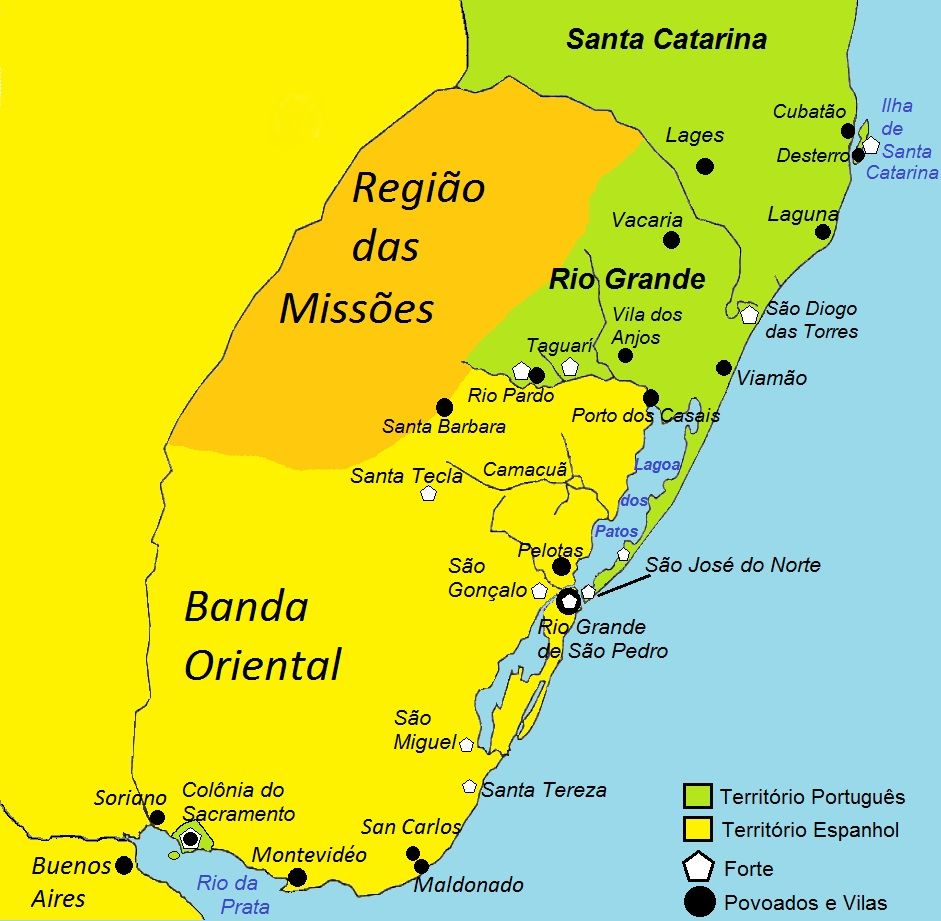
Portuguese territory in Rio Grande do Sul (in green) in 1775

After the Guaraní War, Portugal began to pay more attention to the captaincy, which by this time had just over seven thousand inhabitants, distributed in about 400 estancias and a few hamlets and villages. It was detached from Santa Catarina and linked directly to the headquarters in Rio de Janeiro, having a civil governor instead of a military commander. When the Governor of the province of Buenos Aires, Pedro de Cevallos, learned that the Treaty of Madrid (1750) had been annulled through the Treaty of El Pardo (February 12, 1761) and therefore the line of the Treaty of Tordesillas had to be re-established, he wrote twice to the Governor of Rio de Janeiro, Gomes Freire de Andrade, Count of Bobadela, (who was also responsible for the government of Rio Grande and Santa Catarina), asking for the return of the Spanish territories occupied by the Portuguese.

In 1763, taking advantage of the conflict between Portugal and Spain in the Seven Years' War, Pedro de Cevallos attacked and conquered half of the territory of the captaincy of Rio Grande do Sul along with its capital which was the town of Rio Grande, causing the mass flight of the population and forcing a hasty move of the capital to Viamão. The Portuguese territory was then reduced to a narrow strip between the coast and the valley of the Jacuí River. In 1773, the capital was transferred from Viamão to Porto dos Casais (today Porto Alegre), given its privileged location. In 1776, the town of Rio Grande was retaken by Portuguese settlers in the Spanish-Portuguese War. On October 1, 1777, the First Treaty of San Ildefonso ended the colonial war and gave Portugal definitive possession of the territory of Rio Grande do Sul, except for the Missions, which remained in Spanish possession. Some years later, in the War of 1801, the territory of the Sete Povos das Missões would finally be conquered by the gauchos and annexed to the Portuguese Crown through the Treaty of Badajoz. By the end of the 18th century, there were about 500 active estancias in Rio Grande do Sul.

=== The estancia model and the formation of the "gaucho" ===
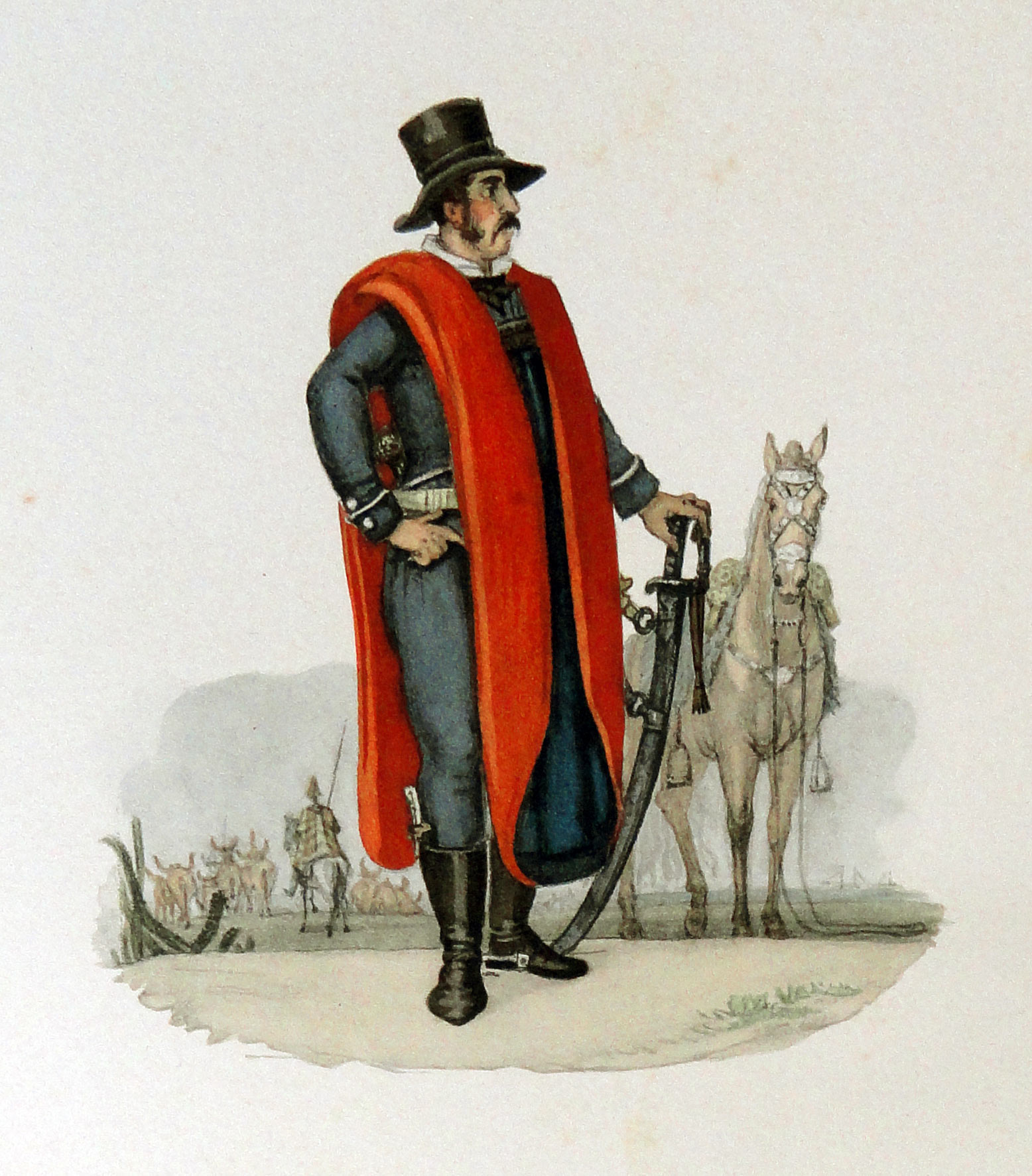
A gaucho portrayed by Debret in the early 19th century.

With the peace of Santo Ildefonso treaty, the granting of sesmarias to those who had distinguished themselves in the war increased, and this class of soldiers, now landowners, was the origin of the gaucho pastoral aristocracy, consolidating the estancia regime as one of the economic bases of the region, but also giving rise to a large number of abuses of power, as the land owners lacked sense of justice, law, and humanity. The royal administrators themselves grew rich at the expense of the province and accumulating vast lands. Each sesmeiro (owner of a sesmaria) compared to a powerful overlord who catered primarily to his own interests and imposed them by force. Repeated complaints reached the Crown, but always with little result. Life on the estancia was precarious, only the lords could afford some luxury in a large house, which looked like a fortification, with thick walls and bars on the windows. Around it were grouped the senzala and free families, who came in search of protection and received a portion of land in exchange for a commitment of servile fidelity to the owner, producing food and manufactured goods mainly for the master. The dwelling of these aggregates was a mud hut covered with straw, deprived of all comforts. A period account, left by Felix Azara, describes the environment:

They have a barrel for water, a guampa for milk, and a spit for roasting meat. The furniture doesn't go beyond about three pieces. The women walk barefoot, dirty, and ragged. Their children are raised seeing only rivers, deserts, vagrant men running after the beasts and bulls, killing themselves coldly as if they were beheading a cow.

Despite the problems generated by the practically unrestricted freedom of action of the large estancieiros (owner of an estancia), the Portuguese Crown needed them to ensure the occupation of the territory, which faced a state of chronic military tension given the Rio Grande situation as an unstable frontier, and being needed as suppliers of capital, carts, horses, cattle and soldiers, as well as other goods essential to sustaining the military activity. At the same time, the war brought opportunities for the estancieros for enrichment and increased power through territorial expansion and capture or smuggling of the cattle herds that still lived free. In a province whose population was massively rural, this context formed an eminently militarized society.

Many estancias produced a considerable variety of agricultural products and a primitive industry, making the property self-sufficient and alleviating some of the poverty of the bulk of the population. There was entertainment in the bolichos, small trading, drinking, roadside male gathering houses, and religious festivals in the local chapel that brought together the entire small community and attracted groups from other estancias. In these meetings, the folklore of Rio Grande do Sul began to form, in the telling of causos (accounts of feats and extraordinary facts) around the fire, in the horse races, in the exchange of experiences about the countryside life, in the absorption and transformation of local indigenous myths.

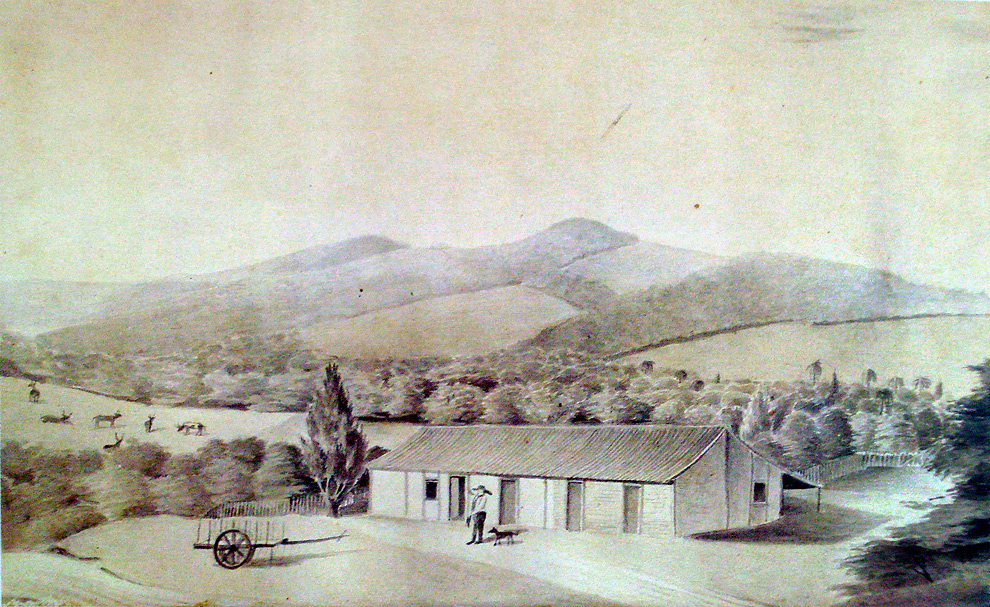
Wendroth: A typical rural property in the central region of Rio Grande do Sul in the mid-19th century.

The estancia employee was, thus, one of the shapers of the prototypical figure of the gaucho, (Note: Today gaucho is also a synonym for the people native to Rio Grande do Sul, being used more often in this sense.) a figure that was actually "constructed" by the local intelligentsia in the 20th century, but which today is the inspiration for an important part of the state's culture and sense of identity. Another part of the character of this entity, a part that concerns insubordination and freedom, was borrowed from the wandering people of lawless men, made up of Indians who escaped from the missions, smugglers, hide hunters, adventurers, slaves, and outlaws, who roamed in predation over the free cattle fields.

Various names were given to this population, among them faeneros, corambreros, índios vagos, gaudérios, guascas, and gauchos. They lived in bands on their own, eating meat and drinking mate and moonshine, dressed in simple clothing adapted to constant life on horseback, facing days of intense cold in the winters, having to sleep, as a rule, in the open air. They were always a danger to the ranchers, especially the poorer ones, and were constantly involved in raids with the Spanish on the border. Their relations with the kingdom's officials were ambiguous. On the one hand, they competed for the prey of loose cattle, but they could also be hired to do the same service for a lord or to perform military tasks with an official detachment. In 1803, their number reached four thousand in a total population of thirty thousand.

Until then, the colonizers' interest in cattle was limited to the hide, which was of great importance in the colony's daily life. The meat was only for family consumption, and any surplus was discarded. The free herd is estimated to have numbered about 48 million herds and a million horses. After 1780, the free cattle started to become scarce, but a new and large market opened up for the meat that was discarded, starting the charqueadas culture, whose product went to the Northeast to feed the slaves of the sugar mills.

=== 19th century ===
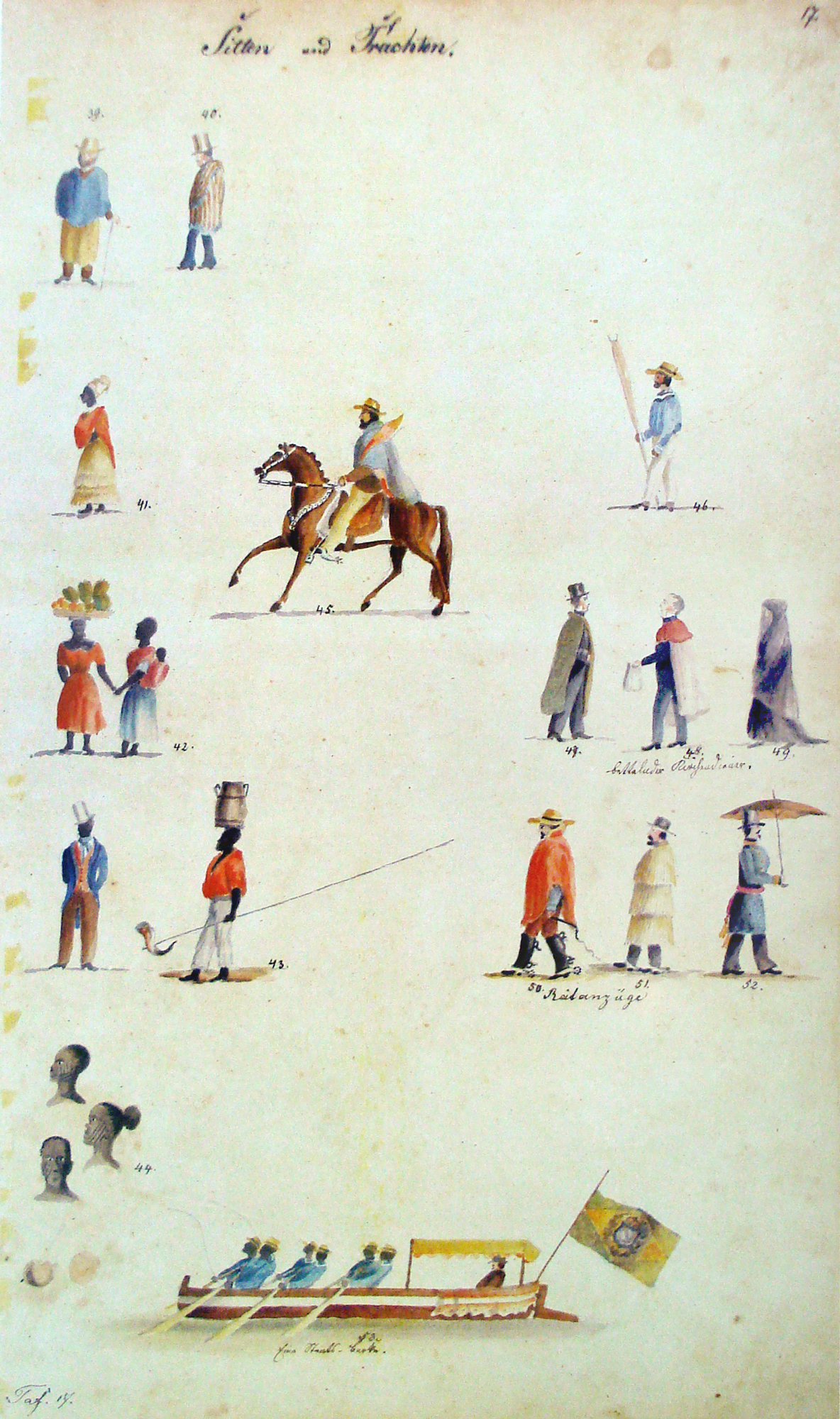
Wendroth: Typical people of Rio Grande in the mid-19th century

After the War of 1801, the Treaty of Badajoz, redefined the borders of the state, giving the Missions to Portugal, with Sacramento remaining with Spain. Thus began a period of administrative, social, and economic organization In the few urban centers, such as Porto Alegre, Rio Grande, Viamão, Pelotas, and Rio Pardo, society began to be structured. An Englishman, J. G. Semple Lisle, visiting Rio Grande at that time, left a very favorable testimony about the good reception he received and the helpful manners of the people, whose hospitality "exceeds anything I have seen in other parts of the world.... I could fill a volume with an account of the acts of kindness with which we have been cumulated."

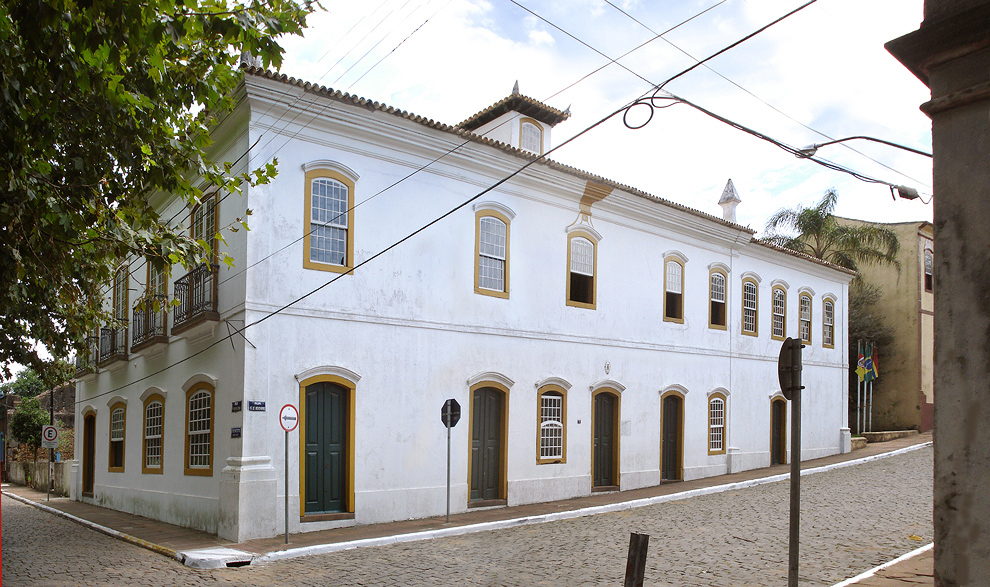
Triunfo City Hall, with its Portuguese colonial architecture

Porto Alegre had about four thousand inhabitants and its life as a capital was beginning to be clearly defined, as well as growing as an economic force, assuming the position of the largest market in the south. Its commerce was strengthened by the growing activity of the port, located at the confluence of the two main internal navigation routes. Meanwhile, Pelotas was establishing itself as the biggest center of charque production and through it, an urban aristocracy was being born, although it was to separate from Rio Grande only in 1812, becoming Freguesia de São Francisco de Paula (receiving the name Pelotas a few decades later). On September 19, 1807, the captaincy gained its autonomy and in 1809 was elevated to General Captaincy ("Capitania Geral"), composed of only four municipalities: Porto Alegre, Santo Antônio da Patrulha, Rio Grande, and Rio Pardo, which divided among themselves the entire extension of the state.

The peace was short-lived, as in 1811 the state was already involved in a new international dispute, now aroused by the revolution started by Artigas in Buenos Aires that intended to unify all the states of the Plata. Montevideo resisted and asked for help from the Prince Regent Dom João, who sent troops from the state of Rio Grande do Sul to fight under the command of Dom Diogo de Souza, the so-called Peacemaker Army. In the wake of the military advance across the pampas, cities such as Bagé and Alegrete were founded. The army withdrew soon after, after the signing of an armistice, only to be replaced in 1816 by an even larger battalion from Portugal, composed of veterans of European wars, to repel the invasion of the Missions by Artigas. The fighting ended with the annexation of the Banda Oriental, present-day Uruguay, to the United Kingdom of Portugal, Brazil, and the Algarves under the name of the Cisplatina Province, which in practice became an extension of Rio Grande.

In 1822, with the Independence of Brazil, the captaincy became a province, the first elected Assembly was constituted and received its first civilian governor, José Feliciano Fernandes Pinheiro, the author also of the first general history of the state, the Anais da Província de São Pedro. At this time, the total population reached around 90 thousand. In the rural area, the settlements multiplied, and Jaguarão, Passo Fundo, Cruz Alta, Triunfo, Taquari, and Santa Maria appeared. Auguste de Saint-Hilaire, visiting it in the 1820s, considered it beautiful, with varied commerce, many workshops, and two-story houses, with beautiful and vigorous people, but deplored the dirtiness of the streets. About the administration of the Province, his opinion was condemnatory:

The abuses reached their peak, or rather, everything was abuse. The various powers were confused and everything was decided by money and favors. The clergy was a disgrace to the Catholic Church. The magistracy, without probity and honor....The jobs were multiplied to infinity, the income of the State was dissipated by employees and their godchildren, the troops did not receive their pay; the taxes were ridiculously distributed; all the employees squandered public goods, the despotism of the subordinates reached their peak, in everything arbiterism and weakness went hand in hand with violence.

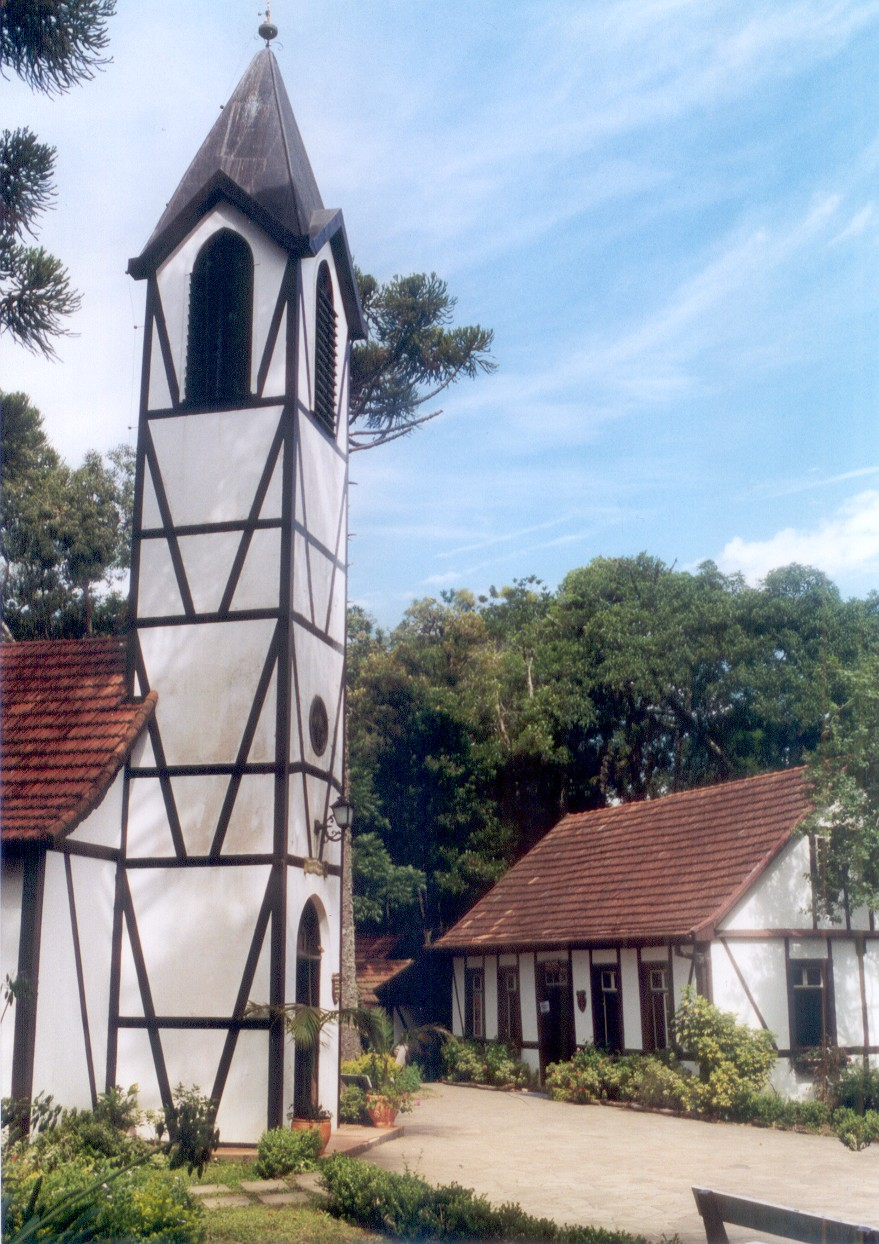
German half-timbered architecture in Nova Petrópolis

The year 1824 was marked by the beginning of German colonization in the state, an initiative of the imperial government to populate the south, which aimed to dignify the manual labor, form a middle class independent of the landowners, swell the forces of defense of the territory, and boost the supply of the cities. The government's immigration policy also included the desire to "whiten" the Brazilian population, which until then was mostly black and mestizo. This would be repeated at the end of the century, with the incentive to the immigration of Italians, Iberians, and Slavs.

Arriving in Porto Alegre, the immigrants waited until the definition of their land and the granting of initial provisions. In this city, the remaining groups gave rise to the Navegantes neighborhood. The bulk of the contingent, however, headed to the region north of the capital, concentrating around the Sinos River, forming the initial nuclei of cities such as Novo Hamburgo and São Leopoldo, and clearing the surrounding woods to settle rural properties. The waves of German immigrants would continue to arrive throughout the 19th century, totaling more than 40,000 individuals, and the settlement centers they founded developed prosperous economies and characteristic regional cultures.

The wars, however, continued. The state was the base of operations during the Cisplatine War aiming to recover the territory of the Cisplatine Province for the United Provinces of the Río de la Plata. There were some skirmishes and a great confrontation in Gaucho territory, the Battle of Ituzaingó, considered to be the biggest battle ever to take place in Brazil. Fructuoso Rivera reconquered the Seven Peoples of the Missions for the United Provinces, but with the signing of the Preliminary Peace Convention in 1828, the Missions were returned - but not before being pillaged by the retreating army, which loaded 60 carts with precious objects and works of art. Brazil eventually surrendered Cisplatina by the Preliminary Peace Convention, which created the Oriental Republic of Uruguay.

After this, the Missions, which were no longer in good condition since the expulsion of the Jesuits, entered into rapid decay and their population dispersed. Losing their references, many Indians turned to alcohol and crime, or were forcibly incorporated into the Brazilian and Platinum militias, while women turned to prostitution. Others occupied themselves on the cattle ranches, becoming peons and taking on the struggles of the countryside, and contributing to the mythology of the "gaucho." However, their situation, in general, was precarious, they were considered irredeemable outcasts, and one traveler, noting the abandonment they were decaying into, described them as "a bagasse of people."

However, the political and economic situation in Rio Grande became increasingly unstable. After the transfer of the Portuguese court to Brazil in 1808, there were changes in the power relations between the government and the local rural-military elite that shook the old alliance that was in place during the time of the conquest of the Rio Grande territory, and increased competition between different sectors in search of closer ties to the monarch and the favors he dismissed. After the Independence of Brazil, instability worsened with changes in the tax system that were harmful to the interests of the agrarian elite and the charqueadores, generating growing opposition to Emperor Pedro I and his generals and ministers. A period of new alliances was forged during the Cisplatina matter as for the estancieros, the annexation of a new and vast territory gave them access to large additional resources, but the loss of this advantage with Uruguay's independence caused dissatisfaction and economic losses. Making matters worse, the pressure of the Crown on the province increased, imposing unwanted governors, curtailing the autonomy and the militia activity of the estancieros, extinguishing old sources of income of the elite linked to governance (such as the tithes collection contracts), and increasing taxes on merchants and charqueadores. These factors, among others, would soon lead to the outbreak of a major revolt.

=== Ragamuffin War ===
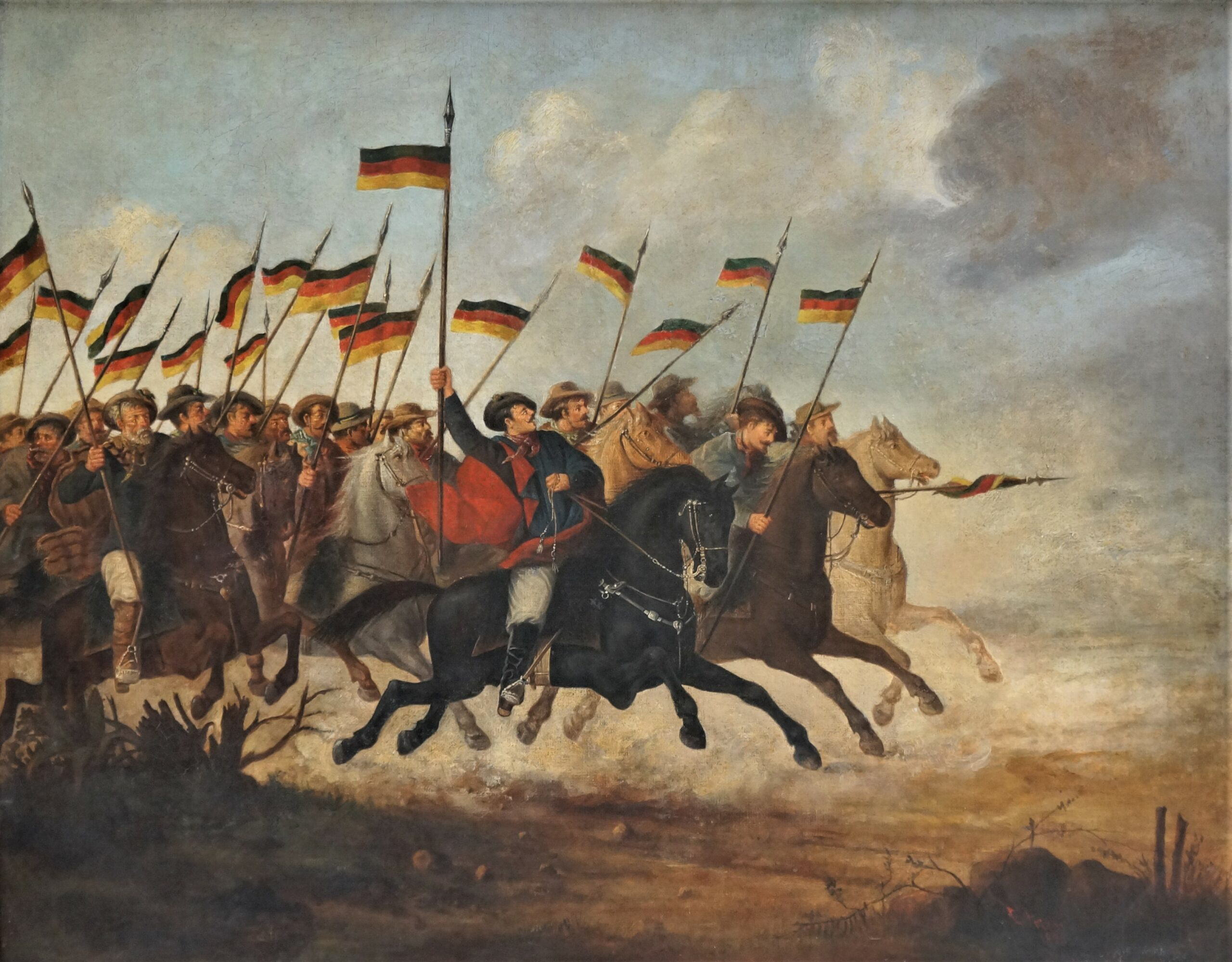
Guilherme Litran: Ragamuffin Cavalry Charge ("Carga de Cavalaria Farroupilha"), collection of the Júlio de Castilhos Museum.

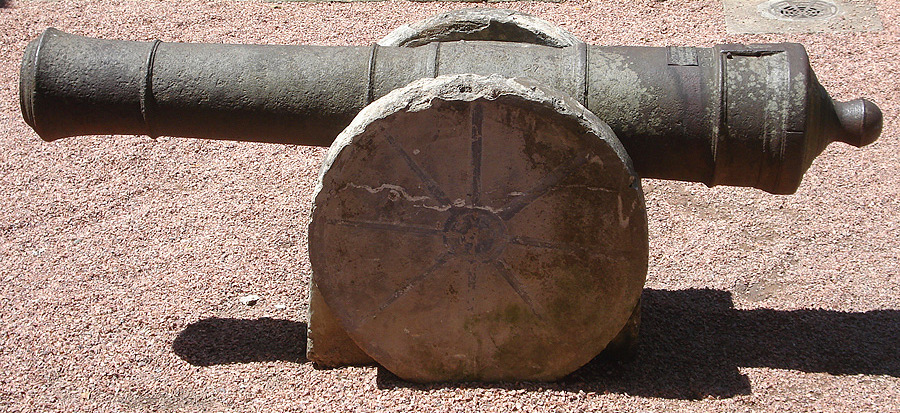
One of the cannons used by the Ragamuffins. Collection of the Júlio de Castilhos Museum.

In 1835, the Ragamuffin War began, one of the most dramatic and bloody episodes in the history of Rio Grande do Sul, which lasted ten years and claimed between 3,000 and 5,000 lives. The revolt was born due to a multiplicity of factors. Besides those already mentioned, there were the complaints against the inefficiency of the provincial government, the economy was declining as well as the elite's ability to influence national politics, there were successive agricultural losses due to natural plagues (increasing the difficulties to maintain the productive capacity of the estancias), competition from charque platino (jerky from the plains) damaged the main economic base of the province, military salaries were delayed, the imperial government blamed the gauchos for defeats in important battles during the Cisplatine War, transformed the public war debt into the province's debt, and remained oblivious to the protests. According to Marcia Miranda, the province had been devastated by the enemy, but the Empire continued to despoil it:

In 1831, the profound crisis manifested by the exhaustion of the old forms of reiteration of that society seemed to have reached its climax. Thus, the news of the abdication of Pedro I, which was received with a celebration in the provincial capital, raised hopes that the reconstruction of the national state could be redirected. It was hoped that the Regency would give the province more equal treatment concerning the others. However, these expectations of rebuilding the relations of the past were frustrated. In the first years of the 1830s, the Regency reforms gave new dimensions to the old divisions and added new sources of internal conflict, creating conditions for the schism between sectors of the Rio Grande do Sul elite. The association of interests between the warlords and the Crown that had given them, in the past, the autonomy of action and shared with them instruments of resource extraction no longer existed. The province was left to reveal itself against the Empire.

With the growing dissatisfaction against the government, accused of making a harmful policy to the state, rebels in Porto Alegre expelled the president of the Province from the capital on September 20, 1835, later taking the city. Thus, the movement acquired a separatist and republican character, which caused the imperial government to react. In a short time, Porto Alegre was recaptured; the countryside forces, however, continued to oppose the Empire. The war ended in 1845, with the gaucho forces under the command of the Duke of Caxias, when both sides signed the Peace of the Poncho Verde. This treaty provided for a general amnesty for the insurgents, payment of compensation to the military chiefs, and release of the surviving slaves who had fought in the war.

This revolt, which resulted in the proclamation of the short-lived Rio-Grandense Republic, and managed to dominate about half of the state, spreading as far as Santa Catarina, mobilized two-thirds of the national military force, being sent to suppress it. In this interval of time, the already weakened economy of the province collapsed. Despite decreed measures for improvement in the productive sector, the revolutionaries never managed to organize the administration of their new Republic. After the war, the imperial rulers were also unsuccessful administratively, with nineteen of them succeeding each other in only ten years. Despite the final defeat of the ragamuffins, the war served to accentuate the regionalist spirit: With the consolidation of the estancieros' power, the balance of power in Rio Grande do Sul's relations with the Empire was altered, causing the war to become a symbol of identity in the construction of the state's memory.

=== Growth and new conflicts ===
Although severely traumatized by the war, with its human and material losses and its ruptures in the networks of mutual trust, the state's recovery was fast. The national situation was favorable: The government of Dom Pedro II was for the first time running a surplus, and the monarch wanted to pacify local tempers. With the restoration of institutions, the installation of town halls was encouraged in several cities and the administration of justice was normalized. The largest urbanization projects received funds to improve the infrastructure and public services, the Lagoa dos Patos was marked, several associations of merchants and producers were formed, new waves of German immigrants were arriving, coal mining was being developed, and people were already thinking about railroads to transport people and the state's production. In 1851, the state received a project very similar to the current one, with the rectification of the borders with the Republic of Uruguay. In 1854, there were already conditions to found the first regional bank, the Banco da Província. In 1895, the Banco Nacional do Comércio was created.

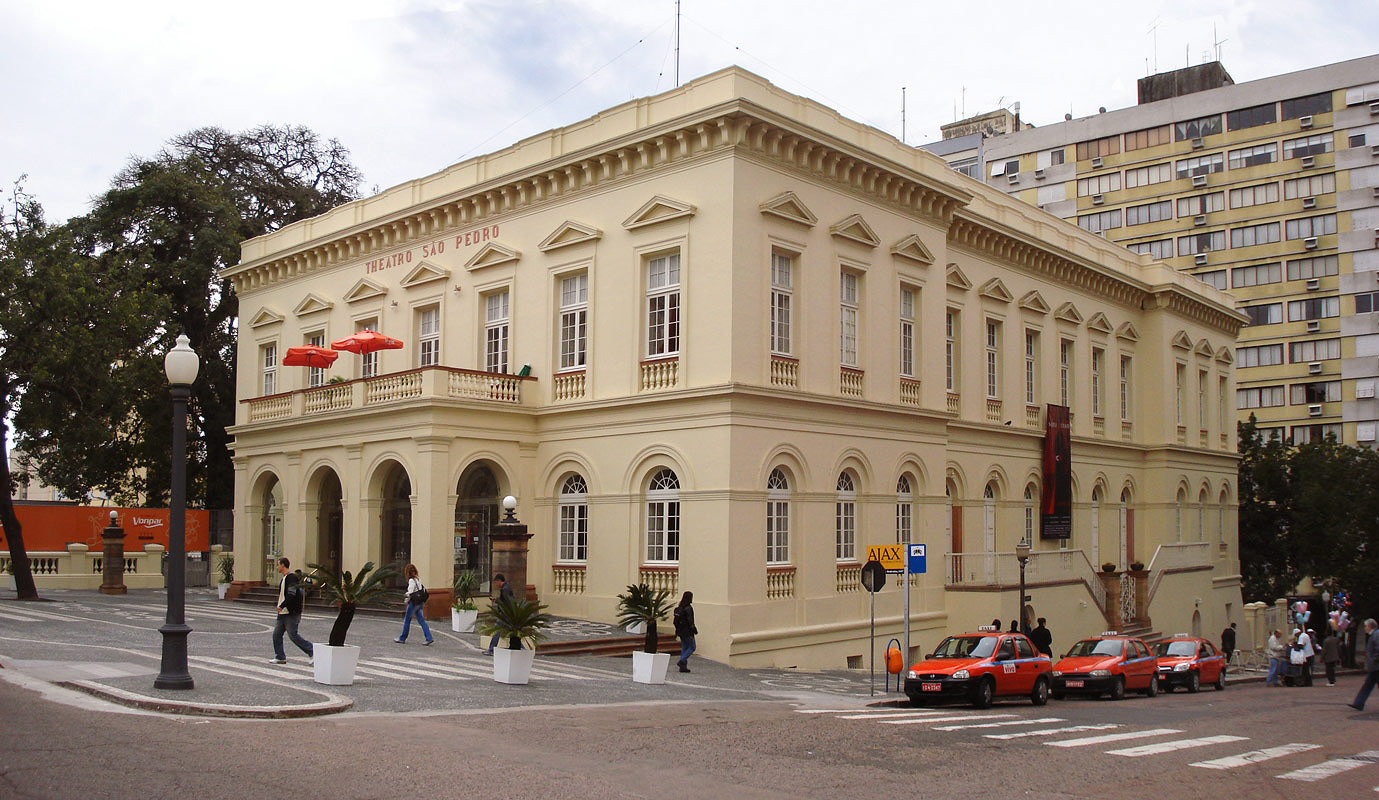
São Pedro Theater.

The cultural repercussions of this surge of progress were also significant. In 1858, Porto Alegre inaugurated a grand opera house, the São Pedro Theatre. Literary saraus became fashionable, and in 1868, the Parthenon Litterario Society was founded in the capital, bringing together the Rio Grande do Sul intellectuals. In this circle shone the first important educators, politicians, doctors, artists, and poets of the state, such as Luciana de Abreu, Caldre e Fião, Múcio Teixeira, Apolinário Porto Alegre, Karl von Koseritz and several others.

The settlement of the new German immigrants, who continued to arrive, however, was made more difficult. Changes in state laws made land acquisition more onerous for settlers and imposed a compulsory mortgage on the land until it was paid off, and private initiatives to attract new Germans were not always successful. There were also bloody confrontations with remnants of the indigenous peoples in the cleared areas, and violent events among the Germans themselves, such as the Revolt of the Muckers. Even so, the colonization as a whole prospered, brought the cultivation of potatoes, citrus, and tobacco, introduced beer, promoted industrialization, handicrafts, private education, and polyculture, and founded a series of other cities, such as Estrela, São Gabriel, Taquara, Teutônia, and Santa Cruz do Sul, which soon became the largest tobacco-producing centers. In addition, the Germans organized themselves into cultural societies where classical music was practiced and plays were staged and noted for their fight for religious freedom and the abolition of slavery.

In 1864, came another war, between Brazil and Paraguay. Brazil was invaded by Solano Lopez and the state sent more than ten thousand men to the front. The Paraguayan War directly affected only three Gaucho cities: São Borja, Itaqui, and Uruguaiana, which were attacked several times, but after a year the direct conflict moved to other places, and the state as a whole was relatively little shaken. Due to the remarkable performance of the gaucho General Osório in the conflict, the state's prestige grew appreciably. He was one of the founders of the Liberal Party in the state, which from 1872 onwards began an upward march to finally dominate the Gaucho political situation. With his death, room was made for another brilliant personality, the monarchist Gaspar da Silveira Martins, who created the newspaper A Reforma and held several public positions, including President of the Province. He would be called "the owner of Rio Grande", such was his influence.

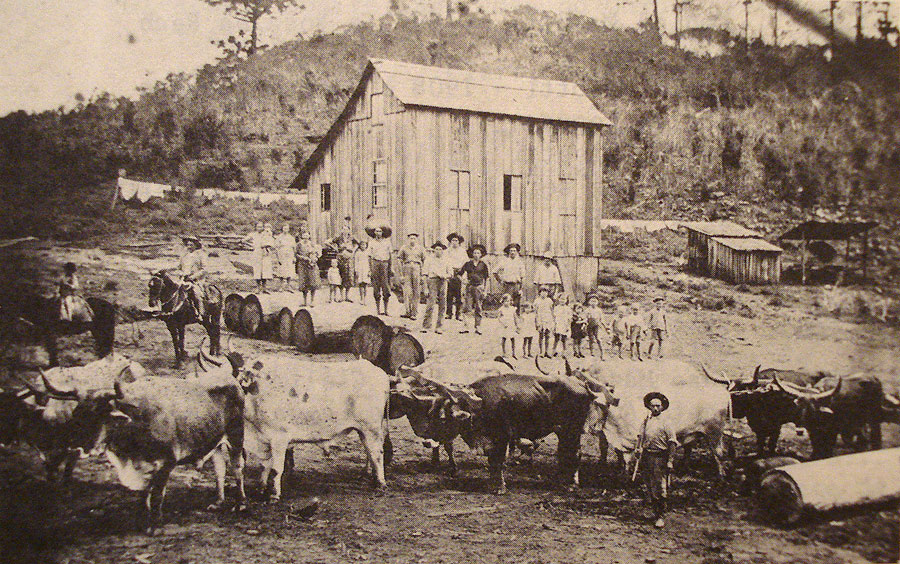
Italian rural property in the Caxias do Sul region, late 19th century.

As of 1874, the train already circulated between the capital and São Leopoldo, starting the modernization of the modes of transport in Rio Grande do Sul. The year 1875 marked the arrival of the first waves of Italian immigrants, in a new official colonization project, to be settled in the Sierra Geral, north of the area occupied by the Germans. Anticipating the Italian occupation of the area, the Kaingang Indians who inhabited it were subjected to a new genocide by the so-called "bugreiros", gunmen hired especially to "make room" for the immigrants.

Despite the predictable difficulties of occupying a virgin region, and the limited government support to the settlers, the enterprise was successful, and until the end of the century, about 84 thousand Italians would arrive in the state, besides smaller groups of Jews, Poles, Austrians, and other ethnicities. Through this new immigration wave, cities such as Caxias do Sul, Antônio Prado, Nova Pádua, Bento Gonçalves, Nova Trento, and Garibaldi were founded, and new products such as grapes, embutidos, and wine were introduced. As had happened with the Germans, a very prosperous and characteristic culture was created in the region, with its dialect, habits, and architecture. The state was going through a phase of real flourishing, there were already about 100 kinds of industries in activity, which evolved from handicrafts and manufactures, and in 1875 the society felt able to publicly display the result of their efforts in the first general exhibition, mounted in the War Arsenal of Porto Alegre. The event's catalog included 558 products, ranging from clothing, heavy machinery, and precision instruments to clocks and works of art. The exhibition was a success, hailed as "a feast of labor" by the press.

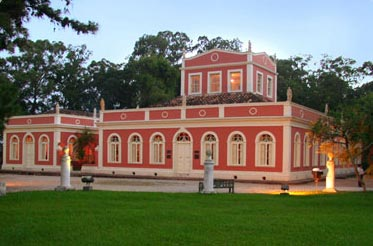
Manor of the Baron of Três Serros, in Pelotas, today the Museum of the Baroness.

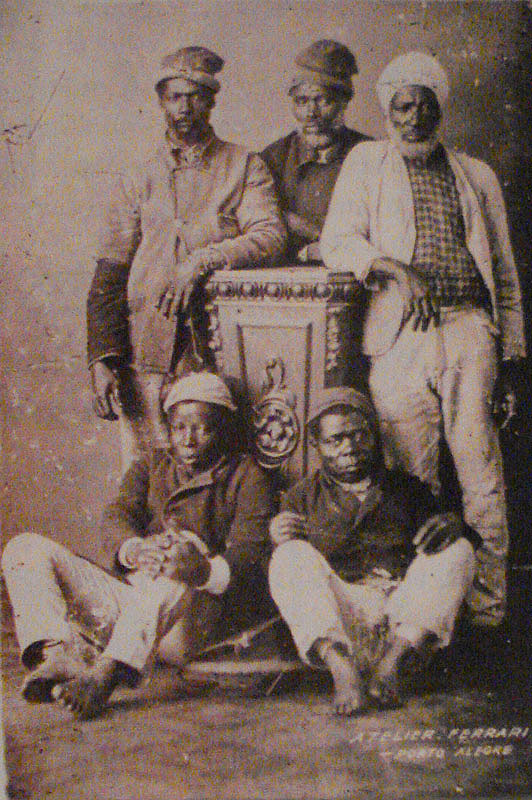
One of the first groups of freed blacks in Porto Alegre, c. 1884.

Despite the growth of several cities, Porto Alegre and Pelotas became the economically predominant in the state, when the charque cycle entered its apogee. Around 300 thousand cattle were slaughtered annually in the region's charqueadas, generating great profits for the local elite. The charque allowed for the purchase of fine porcelain, the latest French fashion clothes, crystals, luxury furniture, and elegant houses. In the newspapers, chroniclers were proud that in their city not a single public building was paid for by the state government, everything was financed by the locals. On a visit to the city, Count D'Eu observed: "Pelotas is the favorite city of what I call the Rio Grande aristocracy. Here is where the rancher, the gaucho who is tired of raising oxen and taming horses in the Campanha hinterland, comes to enjoy the ounces and the coins he has gathered in such a task.

Even with the progress it brought, the charcoal industry imposed an exhausting, unhealthy, and degrading workday on the workers, almost all of them slaves. According to Ester Gutierrez, "besides all the rudeness of the work and the treatment given to the slave population, the continuously reigning bad smell, the dirt and the presence of beasts and poisonous and pestilent animals, the internal space of the charque production accompanied the macabre, grim, fetid and pestiferous picture that dominated its environment." The charque industry was also a place where the workers were forced to work, and where they had to work for a long time.

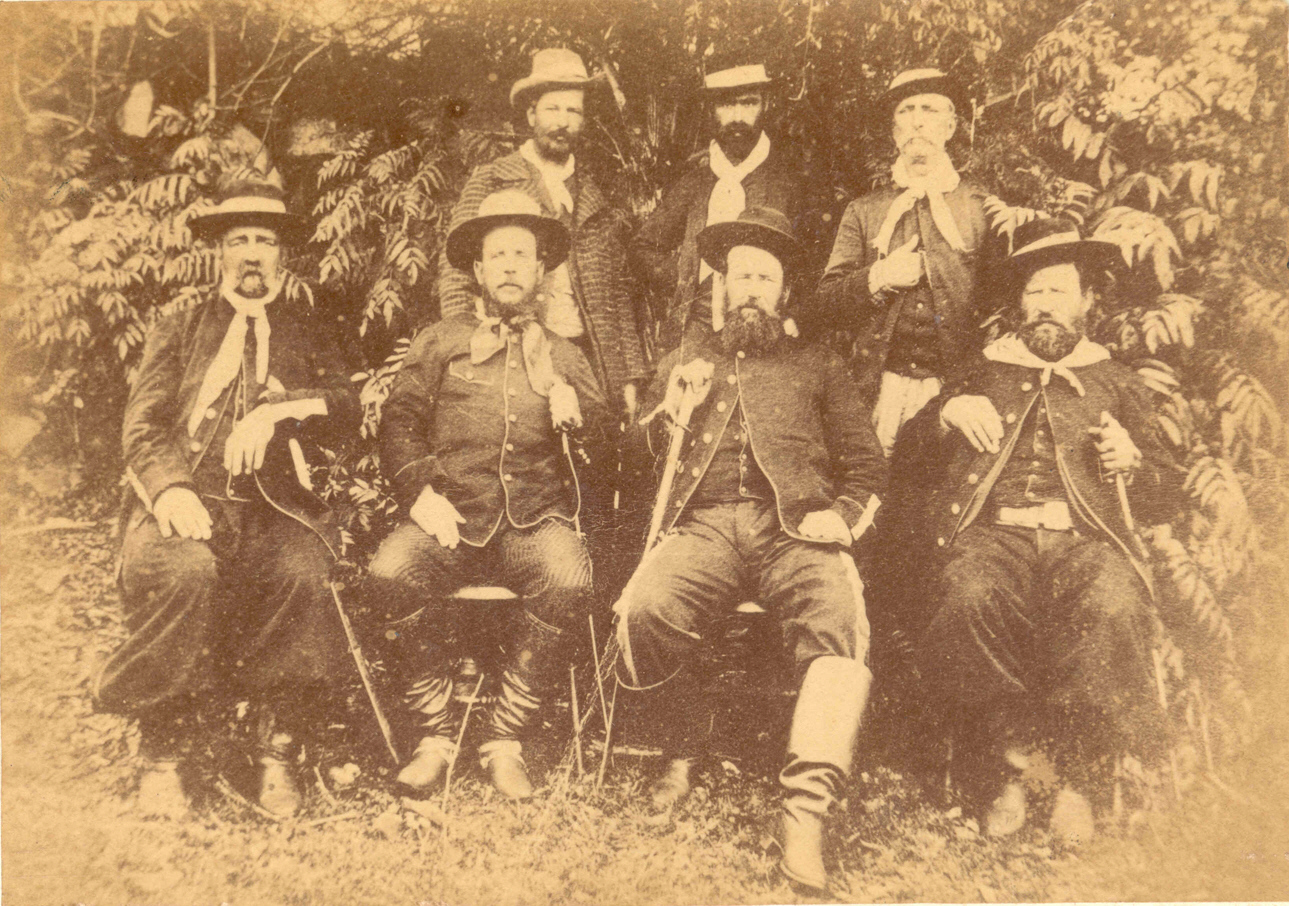
Aparício and Gumercindo Saraiva, leaders of the Federalist Revolution, appear in this photo, seated in the center

While this economic cycle continued, in politics the situation began to change. In 1881, a group of young people led by Júlio de Castilhos returned to their homeland, after a period of studies in São Paulo, where they came into contact with active intellectuals and the positivist philosophy. The abolitionist campaign was gaining ground in the streets and Castilhos immediately took the lead in the movement, at the same time that he created a differentiated Republican Party, the Partido Republicano Rio-grandense (PRR), inspired by Positivism, whose communication medium was the influential newspaper A Federação. Beginning in 1884, through the initiative of the Abolitionist Center of the Literary Parthenon, with the decisive mobilization of the PRR, other parties, and large segments of society, the process of freeing the nearly eight thousand slaves in the state was initiated, four years before the proclamation of the Lei Áurea. The freedmen, however, would not easily find a place in the labor market, gathering in ghettos and villages, suffering privations and discrimination of all kinds, and obtaining low-paid jobs.

At the dawn of the Republic, Júlio de Castilhos became secretary of the government and then participated in the drafting of the new Constitution in Rio de Janeiro. Approved on July 14, the first election for a Constitutional presidency was held on the same day, and Castilhos won with 100% of the votes. But political rivalries had reached a point of no return. The Federalist Party (formerly Liberal Party) fought for centralization and the parliamentary system; the Republican Party, for the presidential system and provincial autonomy. After several changes of government, a new civil war broke out in 1893, the Federalist Revolution, led by Silveira Martins, an old adversary of Castilhos, who was once again in power. While in the Ragamuffin War scenes of nobility, honor, and altruism could still be seen, throughout the Federalist Revolution, cruelty and villainy became widespread. Décio Freitas says it was the most violent of civil wars in all of Latin America, and others who have written about it never cease to reiterate expressions of horror. It lasted more than two years and claimed more than ten thousand lives, imprinting a stain of fratricidal hatred that to this day marks the memory of the state.

With the defeat of the rebels in 1895, Júlio de Castilhos concentrated on himself the absolute control of the state. The opposition was completely disarticulated and the main leaders of the rebels were either killed or went into exile, accompanied by some 10,000 supporters. Then began a long political dynasty that would rule the State for decades, and influence all of Brazil through one of its disciples, Getúlio Vargas. Castilhos controlled the entire state administrative machine through a network of loyal subordinates, interfering directly in the life of the municipalities. An enthusiastic supporter of Positivism, he guided his administration with his ideas of order, morality, civilization, and progress, but he gave little value to popular opinion, as revealed in his disregard for the vote, being repeatedly accused of rigging elections. In his circle, he was seen as an enlightened one, and even though he exercised dictatorial power, he overlooked old offenses and did not obstruct the work of the press, allowing considerable freedom of expression. His charisma was strong, and his government was praised even by his opponents, such as Venceslau Escobar, who admired his "breadth of vision, realizing and projecting progressive measures". In fact, in his government the state definitively entered modernity, updating an obsolete colonial administrative heritage that until then had been based mainly on improvisation. His first concern was to reorganize justice, transportation, and communications. He supported immigrants and fostered the development of the rural area. In 1898, he left the government assuring the continuity of his program through the election of Borges de Medeiros in an election without adversaries.

== 20th century ==
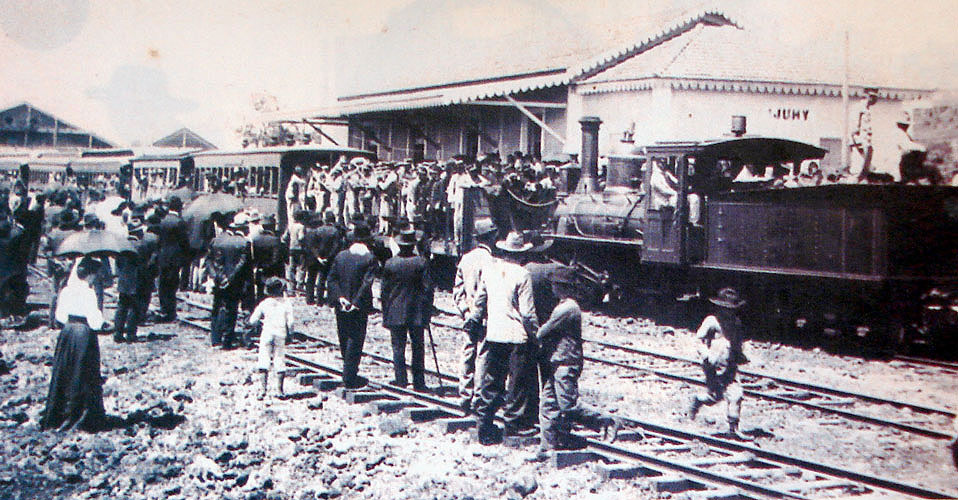
Arrival of the train in Ijuí.

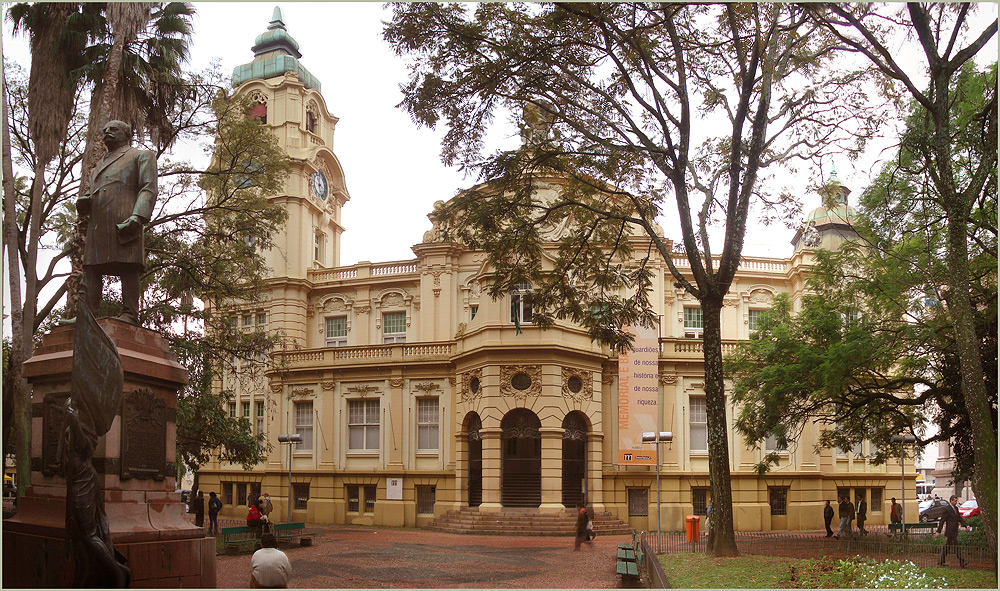
The main facade of the building of the former Post and Telegraphs, today the Memorial of Rio Grande do Sul, built during the great phase of civil construction of Porto Alegre in the early twentieth century.

When Borges came to power, Rio Grande do Sul had around one million inhabitants. Castilhos still ruled state politics as head of the PRR, and nominated Borges once again for President of Rio Grande do Sul at the end of his first term. While Castilhos was a charismatic figure, Borges built an image of discretion and modesty, disliking ostentation and personal publicity, but as his mentor, he kept a tight rein on the power system and was another efficient administrator, whose motto was "no expenditure without revenue". He reorganized the tax system and finished the reform of the Judiciary started by Castilhos, encouraged production by immigrants and small industry, and supported improvements in municipal services by expanding water, electricity, and sewage networks, nationalized railroads, and the port of Rio Grande. He maintained a distant relationship with the federal government, and because of this, the state ended up being disadvantaged with a meager transfer of funds.

When he was about to run for a third term, the opposition presented a strong opponent, and Borges had to find another name, Carlos Barbosa, who ended up winning and running a government of continuity. In the following election, Borges returned to government, managed to be reelected for a fourth time, and carried out another important administration. He faced one of the biggest waves of strikes in the state's history but was conciliatory with the strikers. He raised the salaries of public employees and enacted protectionist measures for essential products such as beans, rice, and lard. However, he had to borrow substantially from abroad to finance his intense program of public works. In Porto Alegre, he was one of the drivers of a construction fever that reshaped the profile of the urban landscape, erecting many luxury public buildings and carrying out several urbanization works, since the city was to be "the business card of Rio Grande". Several inland cities at that time already exceeded ten thousand inhabitants, where businesses multiplied and society formed a new stratification. Bagé, Uruguaiana, Caxias do Sul, Rio Pardo, as well as the capital since a long time imitated the refined habits of the Pelotas people, enjoying cafés, cinema and theater.

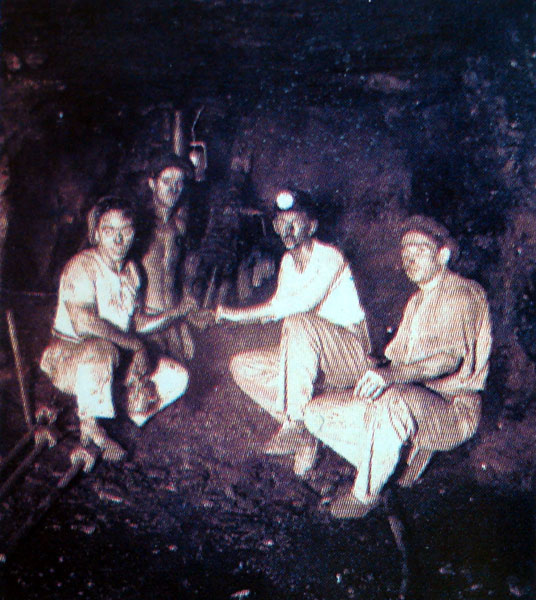
Coal workers, early 20th century. Collection of the Coal Museum.

At the beginning of the century, the state reached the third position in the national economy. The 1900 census counted 1,149,070 inhabitants; 67.3% were illiterate and 43% of jobs were in rural areas. Of the total inhabitants, almost 300,000 were workers; of these 56,000 were women, 49,000 were artisans or had a trade, and 31,000 were in commerce. There were also 3,165 "capitalists," as the big industrialists and merchants were called, and 4,455 civil servants. But the demands of fast-paced progress resulted in the working classes' lives being arduous. Although industrialization in various sectors had brought some progress, it was still primitive and required a lot of hard labor. Wages were low and barely covered the most basic sustenance; the factory environments were not primordial in terms of comfort and salubriousness; on the contrary, by today's standards, they were places of slave labor and dens of disease dissemination. In many factories discipline was still imposed by whipping, employees were subjected to periodic searches and paid heavy fines for minor infractions, and children and women usually worked the same hours as adult men, which could be as long as fifteen hours.

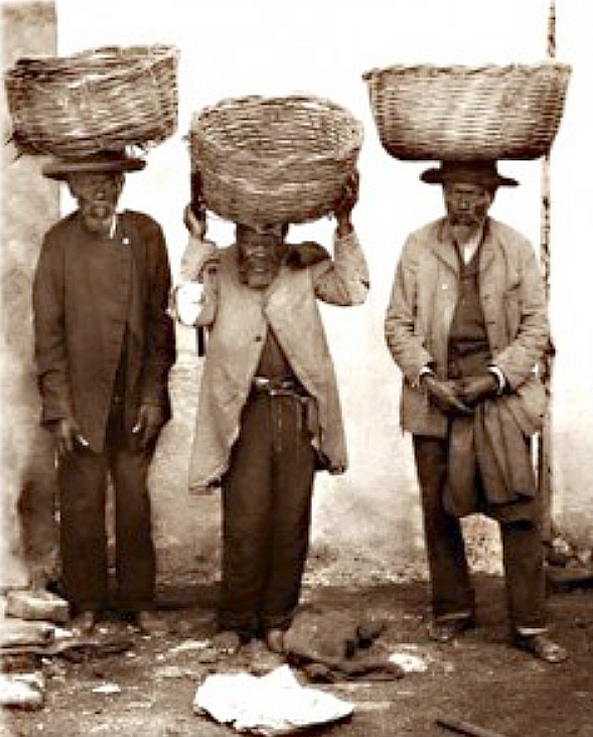
Blacks from Porto Alegre in 1895.

In the countryside, the workload was even heavier - which lasted all day, every day of the year, involving the whole family, and often with uncertain results. In view of these oppressive conditions, from very early on urban workers and rural settlers were forced to find guarantees and assistance on their own, through mutual aid associations and unions, which strengthened the class, giving it the opportunity for articulation and public expression. Along with modernization, the proletarianization of the labor force began, and with it the number of strikes and popular demonstrations against government policies, demanding better conditions, increased. From 1890 to 1919, the workers held 73 local strikes and three general strikes in years of explosive organization, when anarchist and socialist ideas predominated. Exerting an effective pressure, the strikes often had favorable results for the workers.

the process of industrialization and urbanization that was established at the end of the 19th century and beginning of the 20th century demanded from the Brazilian society new forms of social and political organization. The black workers who had been the support of the primitive accumulation of capital in the charqueadas of Rio Grande do Sul, with the beginning of the immigration process in 1824, would increasingly occupy the edges of the emerging capitalism. In the cities, most of them lived in the worst places, in the tenements, on the hills, and in flooded areas; in the rural areas they became servants and godchildren who worked to eat and live on the lands of the former masters. In the post-abolition period, anti-black racism was the fundamental component of the construction of Gaucho ideology and culture. The situation of blacks remained particularly precarious. According to José Antônio dos Santos,

Systemic racism produced an important consequence in local historiography, which practically hid the Black in historical narratives and reinforced the myth that circulated since the previous century that a sort of "racial democracy" had existed in the state, where slaves were treated kindly and had a much higher quality of life than in other states. At the same time, for many decades the blacks would be denied recognition of their important participation in the history of the construction of Rio Grande do Sul culture, while officialdom erected the figure of the gaucho as the mainstay and paradigm of this culture, but dismissing the contribution of immigrants.

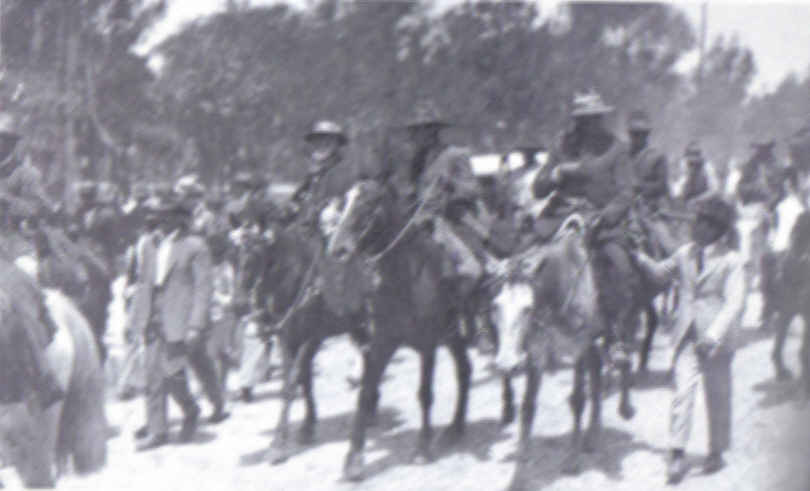
Zeca Netto, Maragato leader and his troops occupying Pelotas during the 1923 Revolution.

In a rapidly changing scenario, the old pastoral oligarchy, which had become enormously rich and ennobled during the empire, and still maintained at the end of the 19th century the monopoly of the most important means of production, faced with the growing concentration of commercial and industrial activities in the urban centers, found itself losing money, political space, and influence. The result was the last of the great civil wars in the state, the Revolution of 1923, called "A Libertadora" ("The Liberator"), which sought to end the continuism of Borges de Medeiros. The riot barely reached the gates of the cities, as it was limited to the countryside, and was an unequal confrontation. On one side were the rebels, disorganized, outnumbered and with precarious ammunition, using weapons from the time of the Ragamuffin War, and on the other the Military Brigade, well trained and equipped with machine guns and a great volume of soldiers. The insurgents lost the war and Borges stayed on for a fifth term, but had to renounce a sixth reelection. The federal government was not involved, except as an intermediary in the talks that led to the Peace of Pedras Altas, sealed on December 14, which was a very equable and conciliatory agreement. It made possible an agreement between the Maragato (liberators and assisists) and Chimango (republicans, borgists) factions.

On the Federation side, there were advances and retreats in the economic sector. At first, the government tried to placate the estancieros by suspending the importation of cheaper charque Platino but soon after it would forbid the flow of Brazilian products through foreign ports, which was another blow to the charqueiros on the western border, which used the port of Montevideo. Charque exports dropped by half, as did chilled meat. The Gaucho economy in the end of these first thirty years of the 20th century was only saved by the growing gains in industry and commerce, capable of sustaining new advances in the cultural field. In the following year, another source of unrest would appear in the western frontier, with the formation of the Prestes Column ("Coluna Prestes"), while the state government sent 1200 soldiers to help in the combat against the tenentist insurgents in São Paulo. These movements, however, had far less repercussion in Rio Grande do Sul and took place mainly in other states.

=== Culture ===
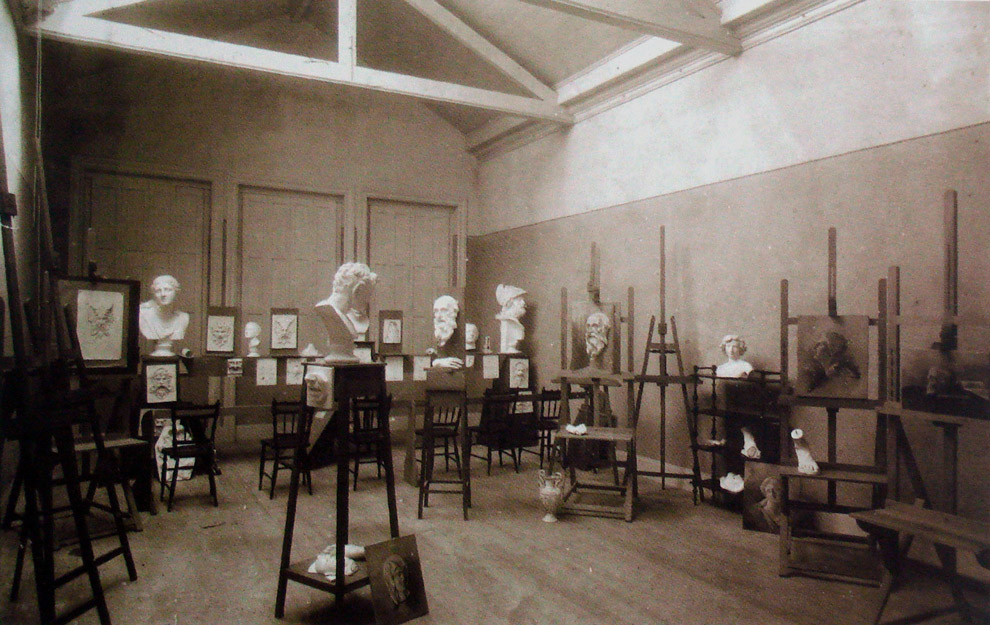
The sculpture studio at the Institute of Fine Arts in 1915.

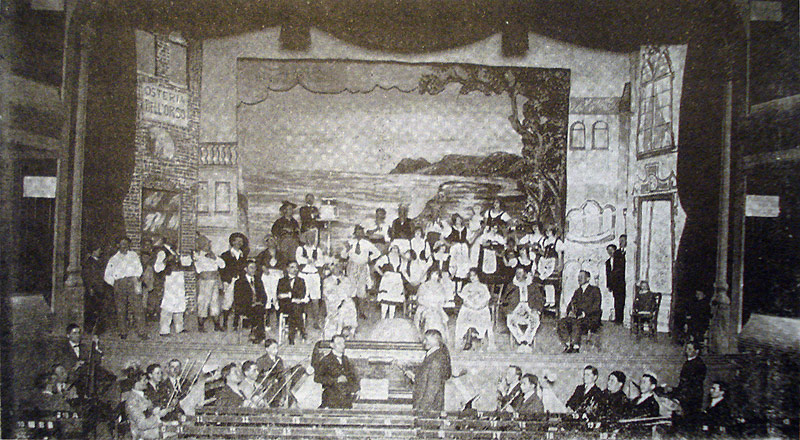
Scene from an operetta set in Caxias do Sul, 1922.

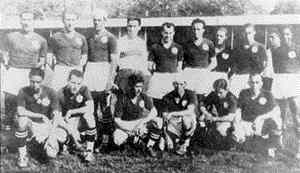
The Internacional team, Citadin Champion in 1922.

The first big cultural events of the 20th century happened in 1901: the foundation of the Rio-Grandense Academy of Linguistics aggregating many journalists, poets, and writers, such as Caldas Júnior, Marcelo Gama, Alcides Maia, and Mário Totta, and the realization of another general exhibition in Porto Alegre, with three thousand exhibitors showing the most modern technologies and products that moved the economy. Soon afterward, the first museum in the state was founded, the Julio de Castilhos Museum, created in 1903. In the same year occurred the first event entirely dedicated to the arts, the 1903 Salon, promoted by the Gazeta do Commercio. This salon, according to Athos Damasceno, was "the first contest to give the arts in Rio Grande do Sul a statute of autonomy (...) legitimizing them as an object of approval and social distinction".

Another landmark was the foundation of several university degrees in Porto Alegre - Medicine, Chemistry, Pharmacy, Law, and Engineering - plus the Institute of Arts of the University of Rio Grande do Sul, including music and fine arts courses, which would concentrate art production in the capital and would be the only significant institutional reference until the mid-1950s in these fields of studying, teaching, and production of art. Some of the most notorious names of a local painting of the beginning of the century who went through the Institute are Pedro Weingärtner, a member of the evaluation boards, along with Oscar Boeira, Libindo Ferrás, João Fahrion, and some foreign masters and professors. Important names in literature and poetry also emerged, such as Augusto Meyer, Dyonélio Machado, and Eduardo Guimarães. The State Public Library reopened with major expansions in 1922, contributing significantly to energizing local academics.

In music, the activities of the Club Haydn of Porto Alegre stood out, organizing many recitals promoting European and Brazilian authors, complementing the schedule at Theatro São Pedro, where stars such as Arthur Rubinstein and Magda Tagliaferro performed, and the first operas from Rio Grande do Sul, Carmela, by José de Araújo Viana, and Sandro, by Murillo Furtado, were staged. Theatrical and opera companies circulated frequently in the countryside theaters, small vocal and instrumental ensembles of erudite repertoire already existed in several cities, and the consolidation of regionalist and popular musical expressions of the Hispanic-Portuguese, the blacks, and the descendants of immigrants in their colonies was noticeable. Also noteworthy is the qualified teaching provided by the Institute of Fine Arts, where Viana acted along with Tasso Corrêa, Libindo Ferrás, Olinto de Oliveira and some other masters. Cinema was becoming a very popular fashion, and sports already had clubs such as Grêmio and Internacional, which would be great forces in Brazilian soccer years later.

=== 1930's to 1960's ===
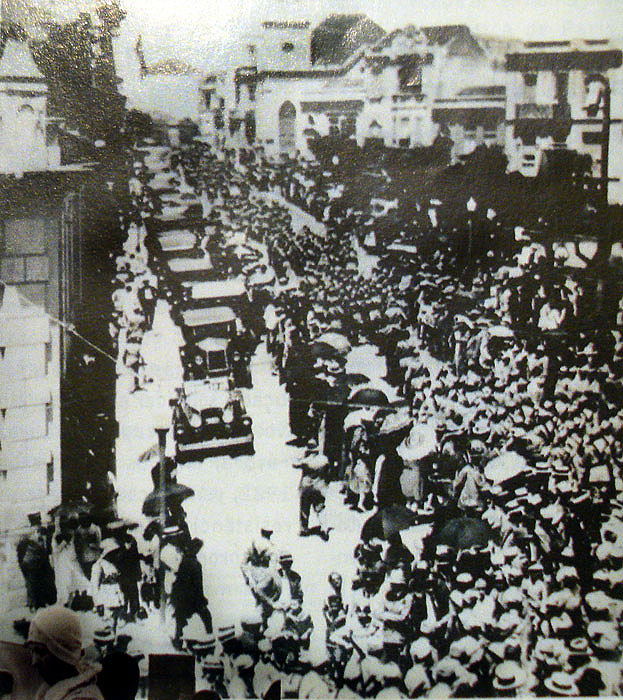
Street demonstrations in Porto Alegre in favor of the Revolution of 1930.

In 1928, Getúlio Vargas succeeded Borges de Medeiros, and was another castilhista in power. He sought the support of the estancieros, representing the class before the federal government, and protecting the unions they were organizing. Finding transportation costs to be the biggest problem, he expanded the railroads and encouraged the state's first airline, the future VARIG. To facilitate credit, he founded the Banco do Estado do Rio Grande do Sul. His greatest achievement, however, was the dissipation of old political rivalries that had long plagued Rio Grande do Sul. The fruit of this was the construction of the Liberal Alliance, of which he was the candidate in the national elections in 1930, losing, however to Júlio Prestes. But the latter would not take office, being deposed by the Revolution of 1930, which elevated Vargas to the presidency with decisive participation of the gauchos.

Getúlio Vargas assumed the government using his castilhist political heritage and the experience he had with the gaucho unions. It is said that it was a phase of "gauchization" of Brazilian politics, but tempered with the tenentist ideals. He decreed intervention in the states and through the 1934 Constitution introduced important reforms such as secret and compulsory voting for those over 18, women's suffrage, and the creation of Labor court and Electoral Justice. His government instituted a version of castilhismo known as populism, as it sought to attract the popular classes in the construction of a new society. However, this was not enough to silence the opposition, and in a short time movements were organized in various parts of the country to remove him from the Catete. In Rio Grande do Sul, the opposition found strength in José Antônio Flores da Cunha, the intervenor appointed by Vargas himself, and in intellectuals such as Dyonélio Machado, one of the local leaders of the left-wing National Liberation Alliance (ALN). Vargas' reaction was harsh - Flores da Cunha had to go into exile and ALN members were violently repressed, with torture being used.

On the other hand, several reforms imposed by the federal government were not being carried out in the state, as the industrial and commercial elite resisted giving up traditional rights. New strikes were organized, workers' organizations broke off relations with the Ministry of Labour and Employment, and the atmosphere became tense again in production circles. State politics also continued to be turbulent, because at that time, Brazil, frightened by the "Bolshevik threat", was largely influenced by European totalitarian regimes like Nazism and Fascism. The repercussion of this in the state was particularly intense because the descendants of Italian and German immigrants had identified with what was happening in their ancestral countries, and by this time these groups constituted large and strong colonies, accounting for 50% of the total population and income of the state, and some of their representatives reached positions of eminence in business and politics, such as the Intendant of Porto Alegre, Alberto Bins, of German origin, who in public statements expressed his sympathy for Nazism. The Germans soon began to flaunt their political preferences in marches dressed in military garb and carrying swastika flags, while the Italians boasted of their ethnicity and achievements, encouraged by Mussolini himself. Still, others adhered to Integralism, of a similar character.

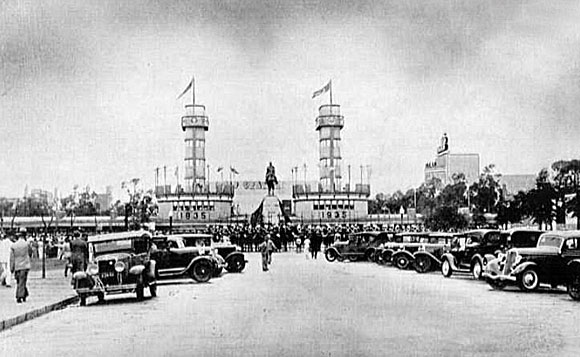
Opening of the 1935 Exhibition in Porto Alegre.

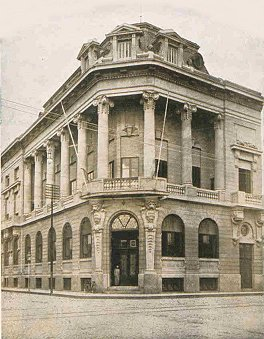
Headquarters of the Pelotense Bank.

Despite the turmoil, the economy recovered quite well after the world economic crisis of 1929. It had relatively no effect on the state, except for its financial sector, with the bankruptcy of important banks such as the Pelotense Bank, which sealed the beginning of a long period of economic stagnation for Pelotas and other cities. However, at this time, Rio Grande do Sul was supplying a significant portion of the national market with its agricultural production. In 1935, to celebrate the centenary of the Ragamuffin War, another general exhibition was organized in Porto Alegre, the biggest the city had ever seen. Besides presenting the fruits of the gaucho economy to society, it had a cultural section and was also important for having introduced modern architecture to the south, which was henceforth to constitute the main architectural style employed in the state until the 1980s, revolutionizing the conceptions of gaucho urbanism.

The right-wing movements culminated in 1937 with the creation of the Estado Novo (New State) through a new coup d'état by Getúlio Vargas, who imposed a fascist Constitution. The euphoria of the descendants of immigrants, who gathered in marches throughout the state to acclaim the new regime, was soon undone, as Vargas began to orient policy toward the construction of a sense of national identity, and thus all foreigners began to be severely censored, initiating a time of persecution and repression in the colonies, and instead of collaborators in the process of growth and population, immigrants began to be seen as potential enemies of the homeland. The process reached its extreme with Brazil's entry into World War II against the Axis countries, with heavy economic and social consequences for the immigration region, including the colonies in the capital.

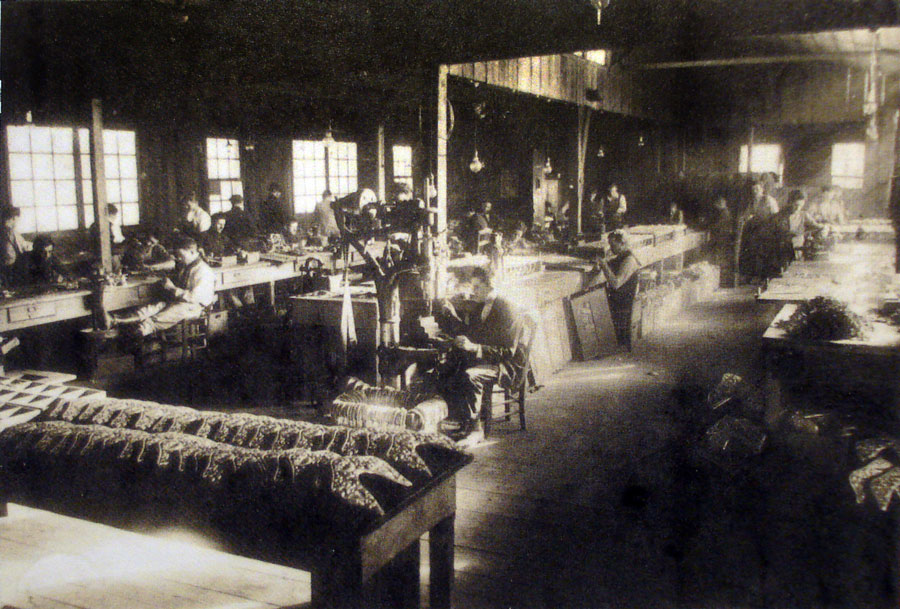
Abramo Eberle Metal Works, 1940s-50s.

In the economy, the trend was the unification of the national market, with the loss of regional dynamism. At a time when some industries from the state of Rio Grande do Sul were already projecting themselves nationally, such as Eberle, Renner, Berta, and Wallig, it was becoming easier for national competitors to penetrate the Rio Grande do Sul market. At the same time, the colonial economies based on family businesses weakened, starting a process of economic devaluation of traditional crafts and manufacturing cottage industries, and cooperatives. This negative impact on the colonies also triggered the rural exodus in the state and the appearance of the first slums in Porto Alegre. However, the state government tried to minimize the problems with protectionist measures on exportable products, investing in the transport sector, sympathizing with the issues of the productive sector as a whole, as well as creating a network of health centers.

With the end of WWII and the concomitant deposition of Vargas, democratic institutions began to be re-established, and in 1947 a new governor was elected, Walter Jobim, committed to the proposal of expanding the electrification of the colonies to avoid rural exodus. To this end, he built several power plants, a program that was continued by his successors. During his administration, a new State Constitution was approved, expanding the powers of the gaucho legislature. Getúlio Vargas was deposed but maintained his prestige, and soon became the leader of the Brazilian Labor Party (PTB), which had in the state one of its largest electoral bases. Thus the appeal to the masses and nationalism, and the fight against leftist tendencies, were still alive. The state politics was divided between the Libertarian Party, spokesperson for the cattle-raising elite; the Social Democratic Party, defending the interests of the agro-industrial bourgeoisie,]; and the PTB, acting for laboriousm, the new version of Varga's populism, which had in Alberto Pasqualini its local mentor. Getúlio Vargas ended up being reelected (this time in direct elections) to the Presidency of the Republic, consecrating Laboriousm as a line of government.

Varga's suicide in 1954 was intensely felt in Rio Grande do Sul, with street demonstrations taking place. Politics was facing a change, and a few weeks after the tragic event the Labor Party lost the governor's election, with Ildo Meneghetti taking over as an electoral phenomenon, until then unprecedented in Rio Grande do Sul. Of Italian descent, his rise to the state's highest office was a clear indicator that the discrimination faced by immigrants during the previous years had been overcome. He had already been mayor of Porto Alegre twice, where he left a solid legacy, prioritizing popular housing. But as governor, he was unable to accomplish many goals.

The state was entering an economic crisis where, despite the growth in the number of industries and the introduction of new and profitable crops such as soy, it was no longer an importer of labor, but an exporter. And Meneghetti's situation as an opponent of the new president Juscelino Kubitschek left the state on the sidelines of federal investments among Developmentalism. He was succeeded by Leonel Brizola, who followed the labor tradition. His government was guided by a Construction Plan, which aimed to improve infrastructure and expand the school network. Meneghetti took over foreign companies, founded the State Savings Bank of Rio Grande do Sul, re-equipped the police, stimulated a statewide agrarian reform, created the Gaúcho Institute for Agrarian Reform, and stimulated the creation of large companies such as the Alberto Pasqualini Refinery and Aços Finos Piratini. His most dramatic performance was the launching of the Legality campaign in 1961, which took crowds to the streets, when the Piratini Palace, where he had been entrenched, was voted to be bombed by the federal military leadership, which, due to the disobedience of the soldiers, ended up not happening.

=== Culture and other indicators between 1930 and 1960 ===
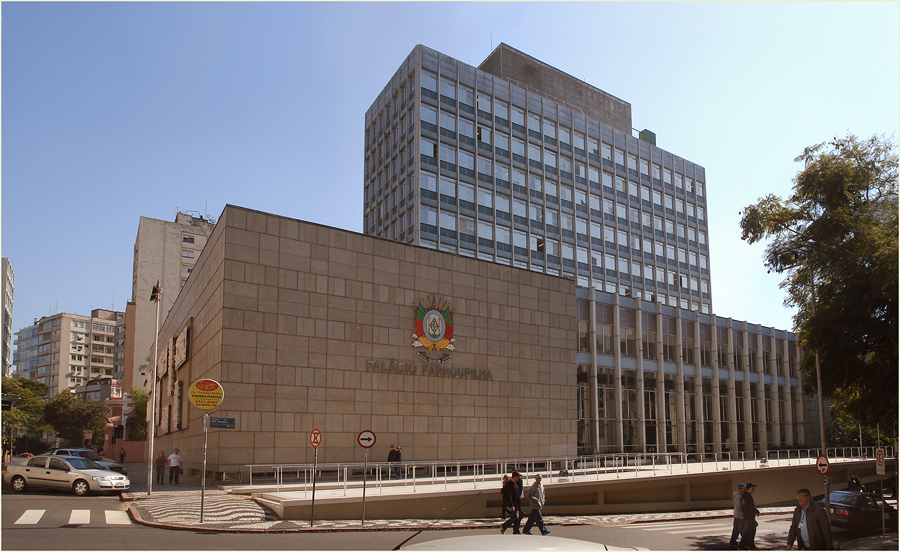
Farroupilha ("Ragamuffin") Palace, built in 1955.

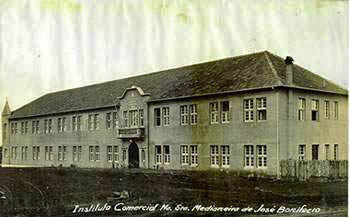
Medianeira Marist School of Erechim, in 1935.

In culture, the main movements of these thirty years took place in the capital. It was relevant in this period the creation, in 1934, of the University of Porto Alegre, which was the predecessor of the University of Rio Grande do Sul. By the end of the 1930s, Modernism was already stimulating an intense debate among the intellectual elite about the new directions that art was taking. This movement was introduced in Porto Alegre first by the graphic arts, with emphasis on illustrations in magazines such as Revista do Globo, which had a large circulation, and in its workshops a group of talented illustrators, some of whom would later define the profile of the best local and state art. Among them were Ernest Zeuner, Edgar Koetz, Francis Pelichek, and João Fahrion For blacks, who until then had been continuously despised by society, the year 1943 represented the initial milestone of their mobilization, when the Union of Men of Color was founded, which five years later would already be branching out to ten other states of the Federation.

Porto Alegre in the 1950s already had its layout largely transformed by modernist architecture, which included major improvements in the urban plan and large public buildings. The city was holding its Book Fair, had a museum specially dedicated to the arts (MARGS), a federal university (UFRGS), was hearing concerts by its new orchestra (OSPA), and names such as Mário Quintana, Aldo Obino, Lupicínio Rodrigues, Dante de Laytano, Aldo Locatelli, Érico Veríssimo, Manuelito de Ornelas, Paixão Côrtes, Walter Spalding, Bruno Kiefer, Túlio Piva, Barbosa Lessa, Armando Albuquerque, Ado Malagoli, and Ângelo Guido, among many others, were references in the fields of literature, poetry, historiography, traditionalism and folklore, fine arts, music, and art criticism.

At the turn of the 1960s, Porto Alegre's bohemian life had been enriched with strong political and cultural spheres, bringing together an expressive group of influential intellectuals and artistic producers, aligned to existentialism and communism. Between the end of the previous decade and the years preceding the coup in '64, avant-garde theater plays were staged, with polemic approaches that challenged the status quo; the plastic arts showed a realistic/expressionist feature, often of a social, regionalist, and pamphleteering nature, with artists such as Francisco Stockinger, Vasco Prado, Iberê Camargo, and members of the Bagé Group (active in the capital) and the Porto Alegre Engraving Club standing out. By this time Livraria Vitória had become the major arena for philosophical and political discussion.

In the 1950s, the state had one of the best life prospects in the country. The life span of the population extended on average until 55 years old, 30% above the national average, while child mortality was half of the Brazilian one; the incidence of tuberculosis was in clear decline; the fluoridation of drinking water had begun; there were around two thousand doctors in activity and more than twenty thousand hospital beds available. Education throughout the state reached an advanced level, expanding to rural areas, and with large schools operating in many cities, which often relied on the efforts of religious institutions, especially Catholics, who, besides schools, also maintained hospitals, asylums, and other welfare works. By the end of the 1950s, there were more than two thousand elementary schools, and colleges multiplied, reaching almost 150. The number of cities with more than five thousand inhabitants reached about 70, and the conurbation of Porto Alegre with neighboring cities was evident, forming a metropolitan region with more than 800 thousand inhabitants when the total of the state exceeded 5 million.

=== Military dictatorship ===
In 1962, Meneghetti was reelected, in a coalition that had the support of large conservative forces, while the Labor party was divided with the emergence of Fernando Ferrari's renovating Laboriousm. Meneghetti represented the most sensible option for those important sectors of society that, fearing the communist advance, were preparing the military coup of 64, when the governor played a major role. He articulated decisive connections with national leaders and, on the afternoon of April 1, 1964, transferred the state government to Passo Fundo, in Operation Farroupilha ("Ragamuffin"), in order not to be deposed by the resistance that was being organized in Porto Alegre by the forces loyal to João Goulart. On the 3rd, when Goulart was in the countryside, about to retire into exile in Uruguay, Meneghetti returned to the capital, led by a combined force of units from the Army's 3rd Infantry Division, based in Santa Maria, and troops from the Military Brigade.

The military movement was consolidated through force. Immediately there were reactions in various spheres, including anti-coup street demonstrations, but all were violently repressed. The mayor of Porto Alegre, Sereno Chaise, was arrested, along with hundreds of people. However, they were mostly released in the first week. Repression remained the usual resource for preserving the new order, justified as a national security measure, and soon there were more arrests, along with the closing of newspapers, peasant leagues, unions, and the Student Union, revocation of politicians, extinction of parties and purges of professors from universities. It also created a system of indirect elections for governor. The main theoretician of the regime was the Rio Grande do Sul general Golbery do Couto e Silva, who became head of the National Intelligence Service, although he was not a hardliner. Until 1968, the students remained the main force of opposition to the military, challenging them in several confrontations. That same year Institutional Act 5 was created, which unleashed a new cycle of impeachment, generalized censorship of the press, and the officialdom began to use torture and death as a means of silencing opposing voices.

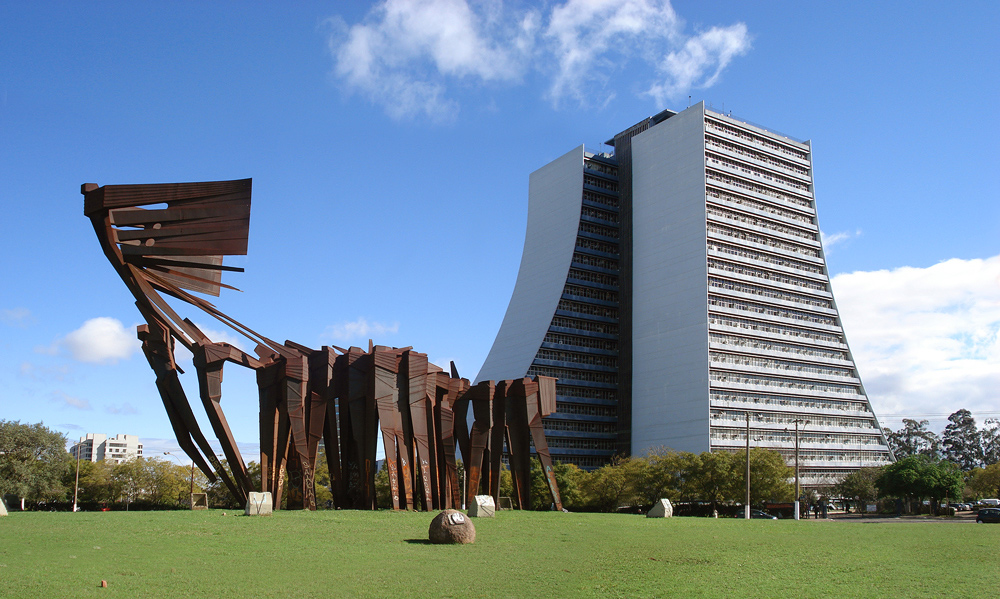
State Administrative Center, built in the 1970s, with a monument by Carlos Tenius in the foreground celebrating Azorean colonization in Porto Alegre.

Entering the 1970s, the military regime was going through its strictest phase, but at the same time the country was entering a phase of euphoria with the economic acceleration, in a cycle known as the Brazilian Miracle, when growth reached more than 10% a year. With this, large public works were carried out in the cities, especially in Porto Alegre, and the state became one of the engines of the national economy through the huge increase in soybean cultivation, then the main product of the state and the most important item in Brazil's exports, with subsidized credit, tax exemptions and massive investments in the mechanization of crops. With soybean on the rise, the producers became richer, the concentration of land increased, and public income was also used to expand the medical and school assistance networks. However, mechanization drove the workers out of the countryside, aggravating rural flight. The emphasis on only one productive sector, protected by various incentives, eventually unbalanced the state's economy with a severe fiscal crisis, exacerbated with the rise in oil prices, leading to public deficit and severe foreign debt.

In the middle of the decade, with the support of the Catholic Church, the opposition managed to reorganize itself around the Brazilian Democratic Movement (MDB), the only authorized opposition party. In 1974, the first "free" political debate broadcast by Brazilian television took place in Porto Alegre, when the Rio Grande do Sul senatorial candidates Paulo Brossard, from the MDB, and the incumbent Nestor Jost faced each other. The planning and the realization of this event were done with caution by TV Gaúcha, avoiding the most sensitive points of polemics, but even so it was a watershed. The result of the elections confirmed the predominance of the MDB in the whole country, and the softening phase of the military regime was slowly beginning. Governor Sinval Guazzelli thus had to dialogue with the opposition in order to govern. But other sectors of the government, more radical and unhappy with the new concessions, conceived independent actions of repression in order to demoralize the governor.

The kidnapping of Lilian Celiberti and Universindo Diaz was emblematic. They were taken to Uruguay, tortured and convicted of political crimes, as part of Operation Condor, a political-military alliance between the various military regimes in South America with the aim of coordinating the repression of opponents of these dictatorships. Still, the distension process was irreversible. In 1979, in pioneering initiatives, the state began a process of amnesty for the politically persecuted, when the Assembly honored those who had been expelled, the Porto Alegre City Council rehabilitated councilmen, and the Cruz Alta City Council readmitted public servants expelled by the military. At the same time, the parties were allowed to function again and the union movement was reborn in Rio Grande, with the outbreak of several strikes, but not without facing violent repression, the same happening with the articulation of the Landless Workers' Movement.

==== Intellectual resistance ====
In those years of lead, with the environment strictly controlled, independent intellectual life survived in ghettos. One of the most famous was "Esquina Maldita", in Porto Alegre, located in front of the central campus of the UFRGS. According to Nicole dos Reis, it was

a point of discussion of local and national political issues by the intellectuals and artists of the time. It was an emergence of a space of contestation in a neighborhood, Bom Fim (...) as the main point of sociability of the components of this social network.

Juremir Machado da Silva complements, reinforcing its importance, by saying that it was a space in which

the struggles for women's emancipation were intensified, respect for homosexuals was strengthened, sexism was fought, the dreams of open relationships and sexual freedom were radically lived. In other words, we started to defend differences. Through the Esquina Maldita, Porto Alegre plunged into everyday plurality, walked toward the right to uniqueness, and went deeper into the examination and refusal of moral conservatism.

== Recent History ==
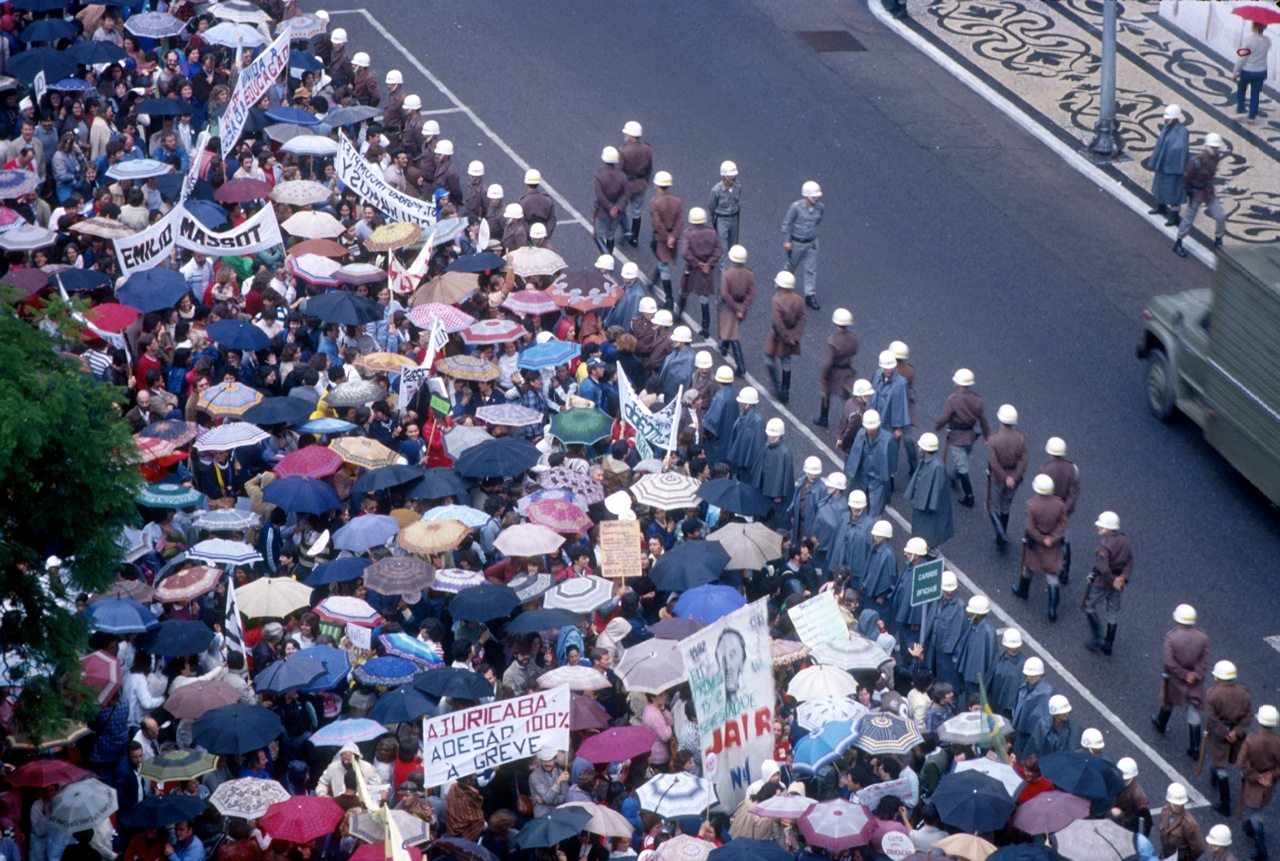
Teachers protest in front of the Piratini Palace, 1985. Photo by Luis Geraldo Melo

The movement for the re-democratization of Brazil finally won in 1985, amidst intense mobilization of society. In Porto Alegre, the rallies for Diretas Já gathered 200,000 people. But when Pedro Simon, the first democratic governor, took office, the state was on the verge of bankruptcy, with a 4,185% increase in the public deficit in the previous two years alone. Several protest movements erupted among the productive classes and several other sectors of society, such as teachers and public servers. Even though Simon managed to clean up part of the state finances, he did not have a surplus for many investments. One of the measures adopted by the government was the creation of the Regional Development Councils (Coredes), for the application of possible investments following the priorities indicated by regional leaders. At this time, the municipality of Porto Alegre instituted the Orçamento Participativo (Participatory Budget) program, to share with society the responsibility for decisions, soon to become an administrative model for other cities; the MERCOSUR was articulated, and given its strategic geographical location, the state assumed a prominent role.

Further ahead, Governor Antônio Britto started a controversial administration that involved the downsizing of the state's staff through a voluntary dismissal program and the reduction of commissioned positions, selling and closing down public companies, reorganizing the state's financial system, and seeking to attract foreign investments through large tax exemptions and incentives. The 2.3 billion reais he raised from the privatizations were not applied to direct economic development but were spent mainly on amortizing the public debt, and the lack of government incentives caused the industry to enter into crisis, bankrupting several small and medium-sized companies. Olívio Dutra, of the Workers' Party, ran a government focused on social causes, settling formerly landless workers in the countryside and creating reservations for the indigenous; he encouraged education; created employment programs for young people; supported the police, and took his experience with Participatory Budgeting to the state level in Porto Alegre. But when he handed over the office to Germano Rigotto, the state debt reached 4 billion reais. Without the means for major investments, Rigotto devoted himself to raising external resources to cover the debt, reduced government spending, and established alliances with the other southern governors, seeking to create strong lines of dialogue with the various sectors of society.

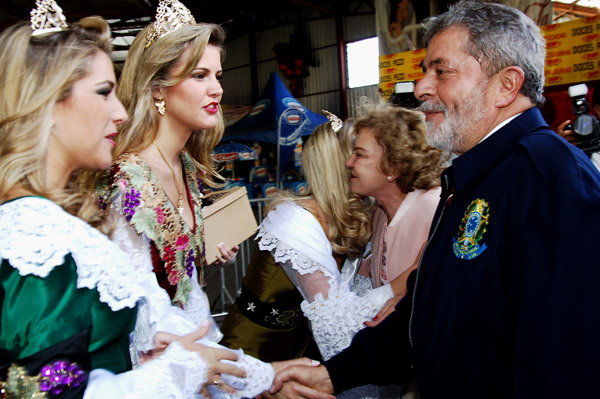
The Festa da Uva queen and princesses greeting the presidential couple.

Although Rio Grande do Sul is one of the most heavily indebted Brazilian states, with about 30% of its assets (2005) in the form of active debt, practically all of it under judicial collection, and being forced to recently borrow US$1.1 billion from the World Bank for public debt restructuring, its general situation at present is positive. According to the 1998 United Nations report, the state achieved an HDI higher than the national average, with 0.869 points, driven by good income distribution and the high level of schooling, with illiteracy remaining below 10%. In 2007, the state GDP was the fourth largest in Brazil, reaching R$175 billion, and the GDP per capita was R$15,800. Life expectancy is around 70 years old, and the total population has surpassed 10 million, 80% of which lives in urban areas.

About 40% of the state resources are generated in the countryside. Production festivals such as the Festa da Uva, Expointer, Fenasoja and Fenarroz have become international events, where large business deals are made. Rio Grande do Sul is also currently one of the largest producers and exporters of grains in the country, and these factors, together with the good conditions of the roads, telecommunications and energy, and the state government's economic development programs, place it as the most attractive Brazilian state for national and foreign investments. Universities have become active regional research centers in various fields, introducing a number of new techniques and technological resources in the productive sectors and deepening intellectual production, fostering the economies and culture of the areas where they are located with highly qualified work. The state government has also joined this academic effort by investing in research in science and technology, and there are several official programs to support researchers.

The good overall position of the state hides, however, regional disparities. In the west, child mortality rates are among the highest in Brazil; traditional cultures in the former colonies show serious impoverishment in the face of widespread modernization; large urban concentrations face difficult challenges in housing, pollution, employment, security, and other basic infrastructure and service issues. The area under cultivation is shrinking, and large trade, service, and industrial networks compete with small businesses, disrupting small regional markets, a symptom of the globalization that has characterized the world economy in recent years.

Another area where problems are growing is the environment. Even though the state invests many resources on several fronts and the subject is part of the school curriculum since primary levels, the balance of its environmental policy has been poor, and institutions, academics, and environmental organizations have been denouncing the scrapping and inefficiency of the control apparatus and institutional infrastructure, the creation of contradictory legislation and the action of corruption schemes. This is a context that has caused profound damage to nature on a large scale, brought countless species to the brink of extinction, depleted or misused their natural resources, and caused diseases in the population, as well as compromising the future of new generations. Problems of pollution, mismanagement, and depletion of water sources in all the major watersheds are becoming especially serious, with several water bodies of enormous importance in critical situations in almost their entire length, such as the Lagoa dos Patos, Lake Guaíba, and the Sinos River; the deforestation of the Atlantic Forest, which preserves only 7% of its original cover and is under constant pressure; the pollution of soils, water, and food by pesticides, using almost twice the national average in a country that is notorious in the use of these chemicals, and the desertification of the pampa, associated with the introduction of rice, pine, and eucalyptus monocultures and overexploitation of cattle.

=== Culture and society ===
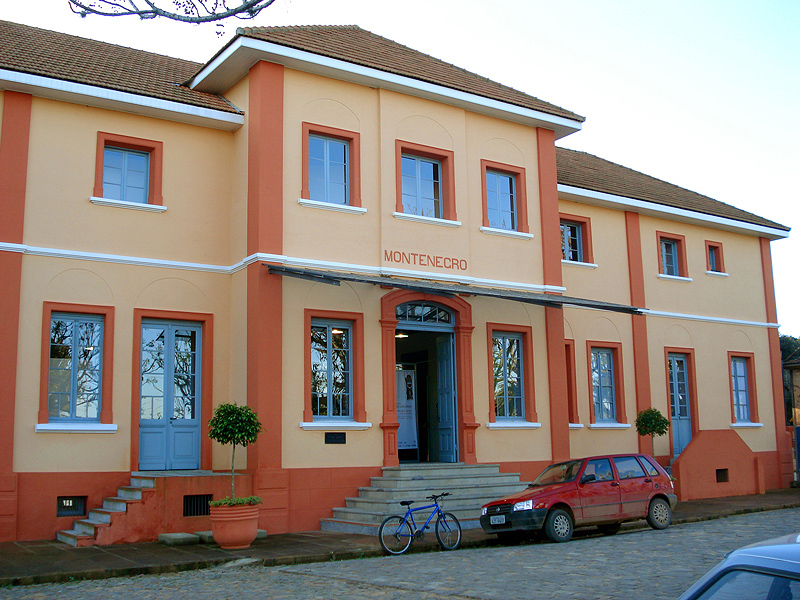
Montenegro's House of Culture, in the former railway station building.

The last decades have confirmed Rio Grande do Sul as an important, dynamic, up-to-date and politically engaged voice on the Brazilian cultural scene. Throughout the state, there are cultural centers and universities in intense activity. In an overview of this period, some points stand out:

- The recovery of the social memory, of the non-material culture and folklore, revealed in the rescue of the gaucho figure, the immigrants, the black and other minority groups, of the material goods with the preservation of the ancient architecture and the multiplication of historic-artistic museums, and in the large investments in culture, heritage, and cultural tourism.
- The creation of a decidedly cosmopolitan culture in large urban centers.
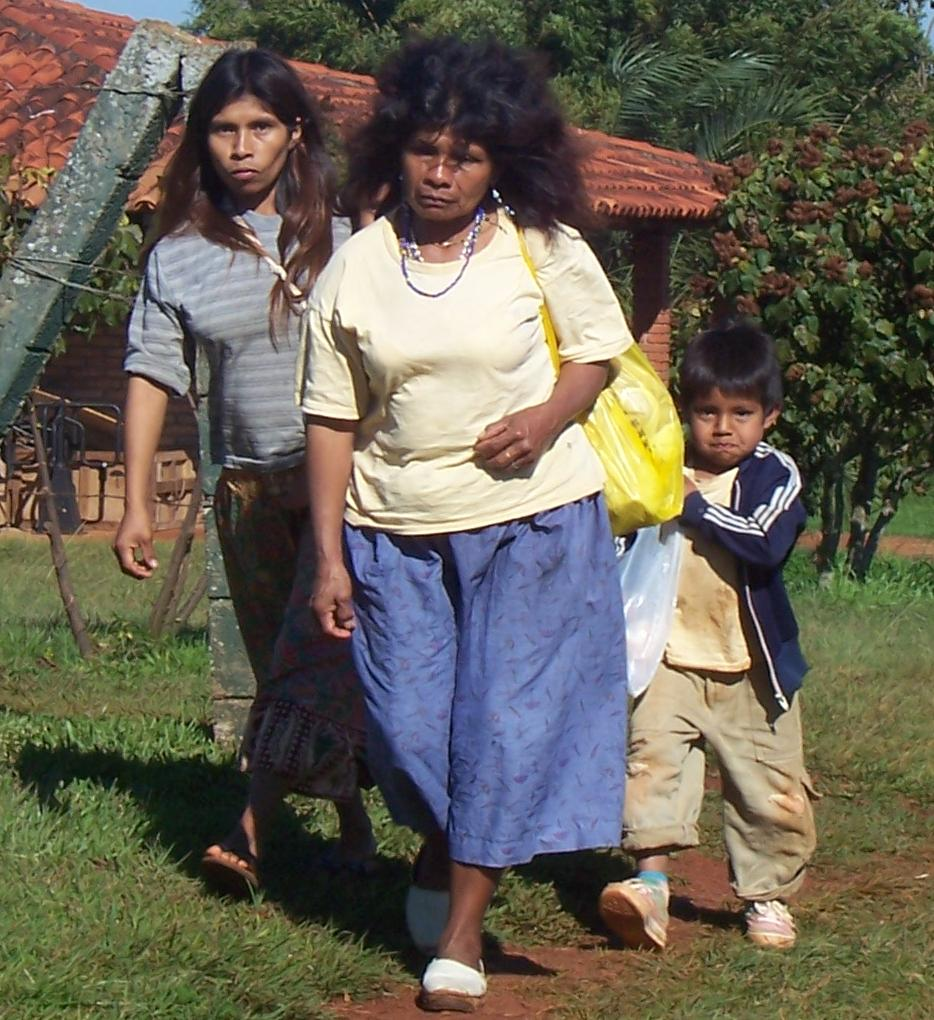
  Guaraní Indians in São Miguel das Missões.
- The awareness about the problems of the environment, with the surging of ecological movements and the evidence of governmental interest in the creation of environmental laws and preservation areas (which increased tourism).
- The revelation of the state of abandonment and poverty in which the indigenous populations found themselves.
- The problematization of social coexistence in cities, with the increase in crime rates with threats to life and property, generating a general feeling of insecurity. In all areas with deficiencies, remedial measures have been taken, although much remains to be done and complaints from society are constant.

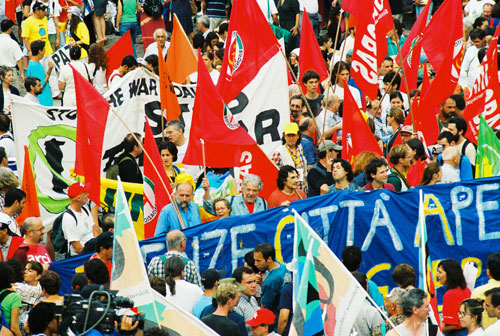
Opening march for the 2003 World Social Forum.

In the early 1980s, civil society was beginning to regain its space of political representation. The state artistic production, as well as the civil one, which had been kept under the pressure of censorship and rearticulated itself in a highly politicized form, claiming the normalization of Brazilian institutional and cultural life. Porto Alegre would lead the main advances. Sandra Pesavento states that in this period

in Porto Alegre begins the local movement 'Deu Pra Ti anos 1970' that celebrated the end of the decade. The generation that had grown up with AI-5 and the disinherited of the 1960s and 1970s claimed another country and another city in their dreams.

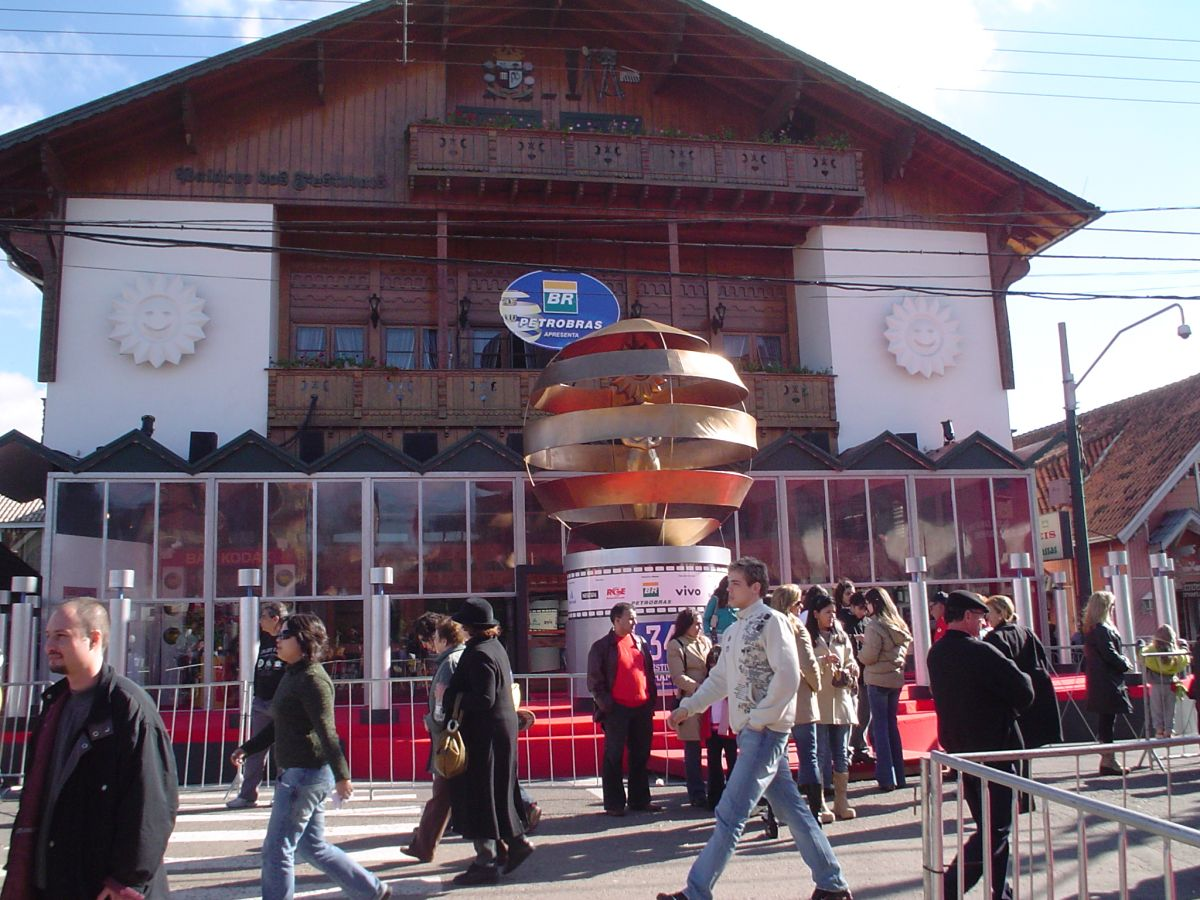
Gramado's Festivals Palace.

In this new panorama of urban life in Porto Alegre, one of the most important spaces was the district of Bom Fim and its bars, forming almost an independent republic in the heart of the city. The main leaders of the protestatory activity of the time gathered there, people with different ideologies, who lived utopias transformed into lifestyles - such as punks, rockers, along with filmmakers, philosophers, and poets - which would result in the definition of the identity of an entire generation. It was the effervescence point of the underground and pop music scene, with the emergence of several bands and singers who marked the local music, such as Os Replicantes, Bebeto Alves, Os Cascavelletes, Nei Lisboa, TNT, Graforréia Xilarmônica. Juremir Machado da Silva clarifies:

We created a combat territory. Those who were questioning social values were living there. But, more than that, the discussion of a political project for society was on the agenda.

Other areas that grew were theater and cinema, with the occurrence of big festivals such as the Gramado Festival and Porto Alegre em Cena, and the appearance of many talented directors. Literature, fine arts, poetry, music, philosophy, and other branches of the arts and humanities followed the flourishing. Some of its artists, like Roberto Szidon, Vera Chaves Barcellos, Luis Fernando Verissimo, Jorge Furtado, Moacyr Scliar and Regina Silveira, are recognized internationally. The state hosts an important biennial, the Mercosur Biennial, hosts shows and spectacles from Brazil and abroad, and organizes events of great repercussion, such as the World Social Forum. Sports have also seen great progress; athletes such as Daiane dos Santos and Ronaldinho Gaúcho are world-famous stars; sailors Nelson Ilha, José Luís Ribeiro and Fernanda Oliveira have won many Pan-American medals, including an Olympic one, André Luiz Garcia de Andrade was twice Paralympic medalist with gold in Athens, while Internacional and Grêmio, already long established, are soccer teams that are among the best known in Brazil, having both won several international titles and possessing large fan bases.

==== The reconstruction of the "gaucho" ====
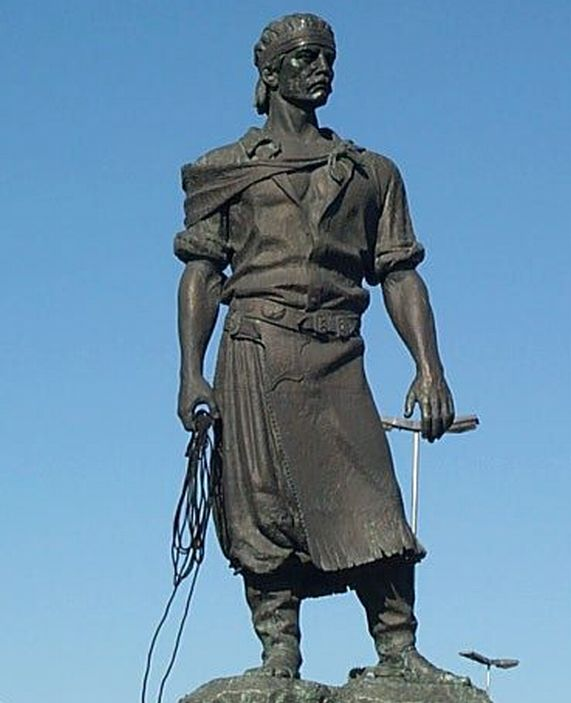
Statue of the Laçador ("Statue of the Lassoer"), the symbol of the state capital.

Today, for the rest of Brazil, the term "gaucho" became synonymous with the natives to Rio Grande do Sul. The rehabilitation of the gaucho figure, one of the strongest symbols of the state identity had a phase of interest between the end of the 1940s and the beginning of the 1950s, due to the rapid disappearance of the countryside traditions with the economic progress and the internationalization of customs. At this time, Barbosa Lessa and Paixão Cortes appeared as leading figures in this process, initiating a series of anthropological studies when this science was barely recognized in the state. According to Cortes:

It was the height of Pan-Americanism. To give the reader an idea, if a peasant left home for the city, he carried a change of clothes to replace his bombachas when he arrived. If he didn't do this he was looked down on. He was considered a second-class citizen. In the city, mate itself was only consumed inside the house and away from the windows. While modernism was the order of the day, a group of young high schoolers went in search of their roots (...) The gaucho always existed as the centaur of the pampas, the monarch of the coxilhas linked to an epic, historical, and political fact, and no more than that. But this is a poetic figure that emerged to become a symbol. And symbols are important to maintain the identity of the people. But this image already existed. What we did was recover it and give it another dimension. Until then, the social and recreational aspect was unknown. It was "Boi Barroso", "Prenda Minha" and that was it. We closed the musical and choreographic repertoire of Rio Grande. There were the records of Cezimbra Jacques and Simões Lopes Neto, there was "O Balaio", for example. But how do you dance? How is it sung?

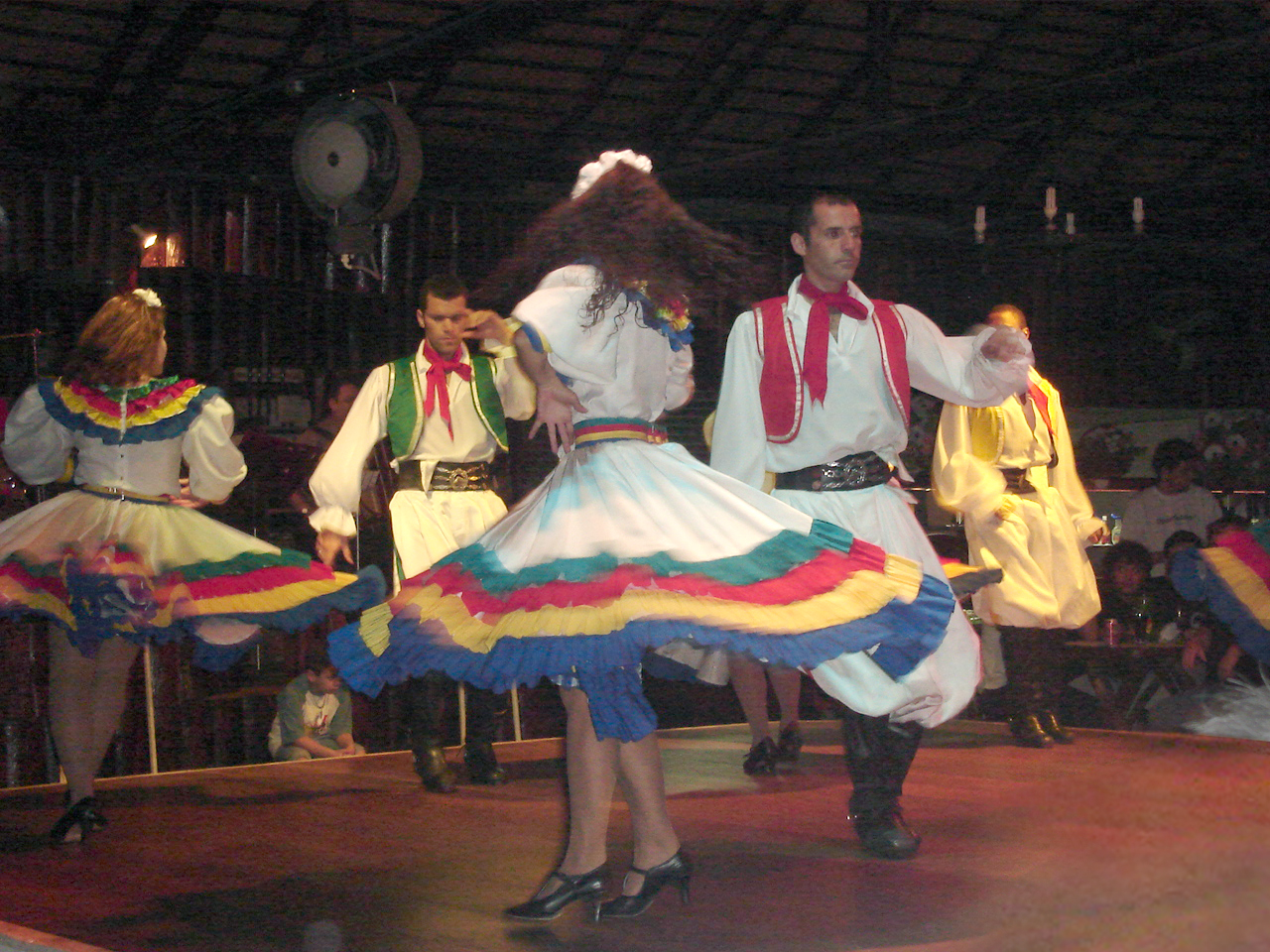
Gaucho dance presentation.

This search was in its origin linked to a desire for historical reconstruction, and paradoxically began in the urban environment. On April 24, 1948, those folklorists, together with a group of young students, founded in Porto Alegre the Center of Gaucho Traditions 35. There they drank mate and imitated the countryside habits, among them the charla (conversation) that the cowboys entertained in the sheds of the estancias. Barbosa Lessa recalls that:

We had no great pretensions of revolutionizing the world, although we did not agree with that type of civilization that was imposed on us in every way (...) we did not intend to write about the gaucho or the barn: from the very first moment, we embodied in ourselves the figure of the gaucho, dressing and speaking in the gaucho fashion, and we felt owners of the world when we gathered on Saturday afternoons around the open fire.

Since then, the traditionalist movement slowly gained visibility and became a true lifestyle for many people, even in urban centers. In the 1960s, articles and lectures on the subject appeared, as well as Teixeirinha In 1971, the first Califórnia da Canção Nativa took place, which branched out into hundreds of other similar festivals throughout the state, where aspects of pop music were also assimilated. These festivals gave space to politically engaged expressions that led to integration between regionalisms from various countries of the Southern Cone, whose histories had many points of contact. But it was in the 1980s that the rhythm of this process grew enormously, to the point of gaining support from the official culture, attracting sympathizers from cultural origins other than the countryside, such as Germans and Italians, and inspiring the creation of hundreds of Centers of Gaucho Tradition, beyond state borders, even abroad. In 1980, about nine hundred thousand gauchos (11.5% of the total) lived outside Rio Grande do Sul, taking their local traditions with them. It is also true that such massive, often uncritical and uninformed dissemination has given rise to the formation of mystifying stereotypes and spurious hybridisms, which have been questioned both in academic research and in popular culture.

==== The many "gauchos" ====
Scholars have increasingly noted that the traditional gaucho does not encompass the contemporary demographics of Rio Grande do Sul. Over the past decades, different ethnic and cultural segments have gained greater visibility in the state's cultural landscape. Regions with Italian and German heritage host folkloric festivals that foster tourism, academic research, literature and film. In many parts of the state, one can still find living and spontaneous manifestations of the old customs. Meanwhile, urban centers have developed distinct linguistic traits and cosmopolitan habits, intertwined with their respective traditions. Additionally, historical research involving Afro-Brazilian, Jewish, Polish and other minority communities has contributed to a broader, more inclusive understanding of the historiography and artistic expression of Rio Grande do Sul.

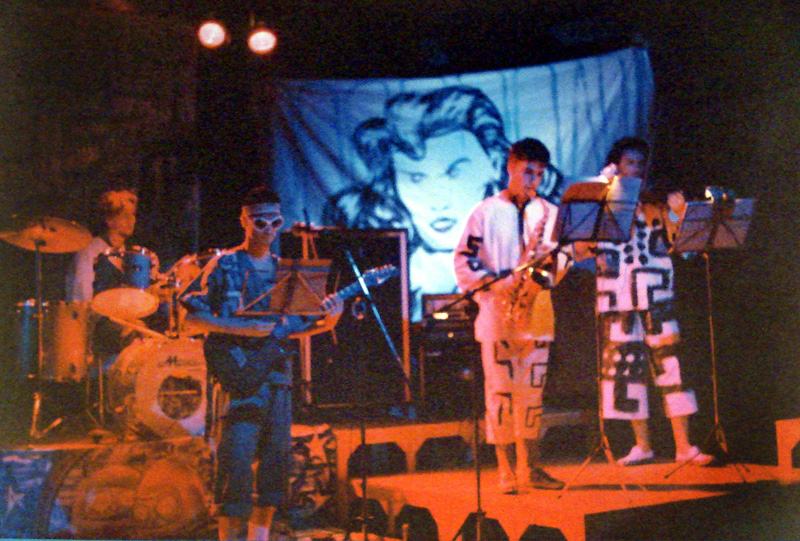
Concert by the alternative rock band Aristóteles de Ananias Jr.

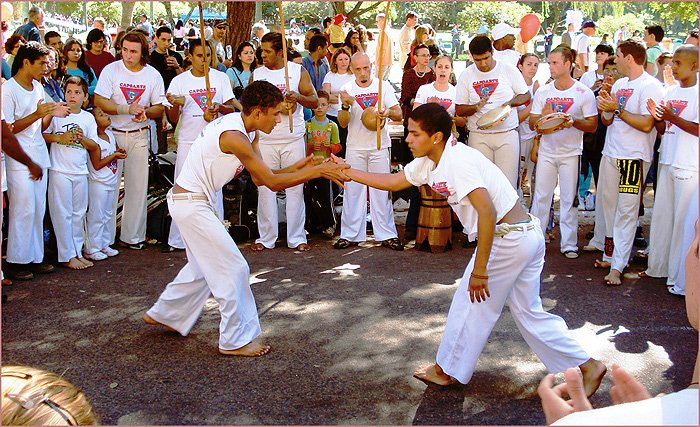
Capoeira circle at Brique da Redenção.

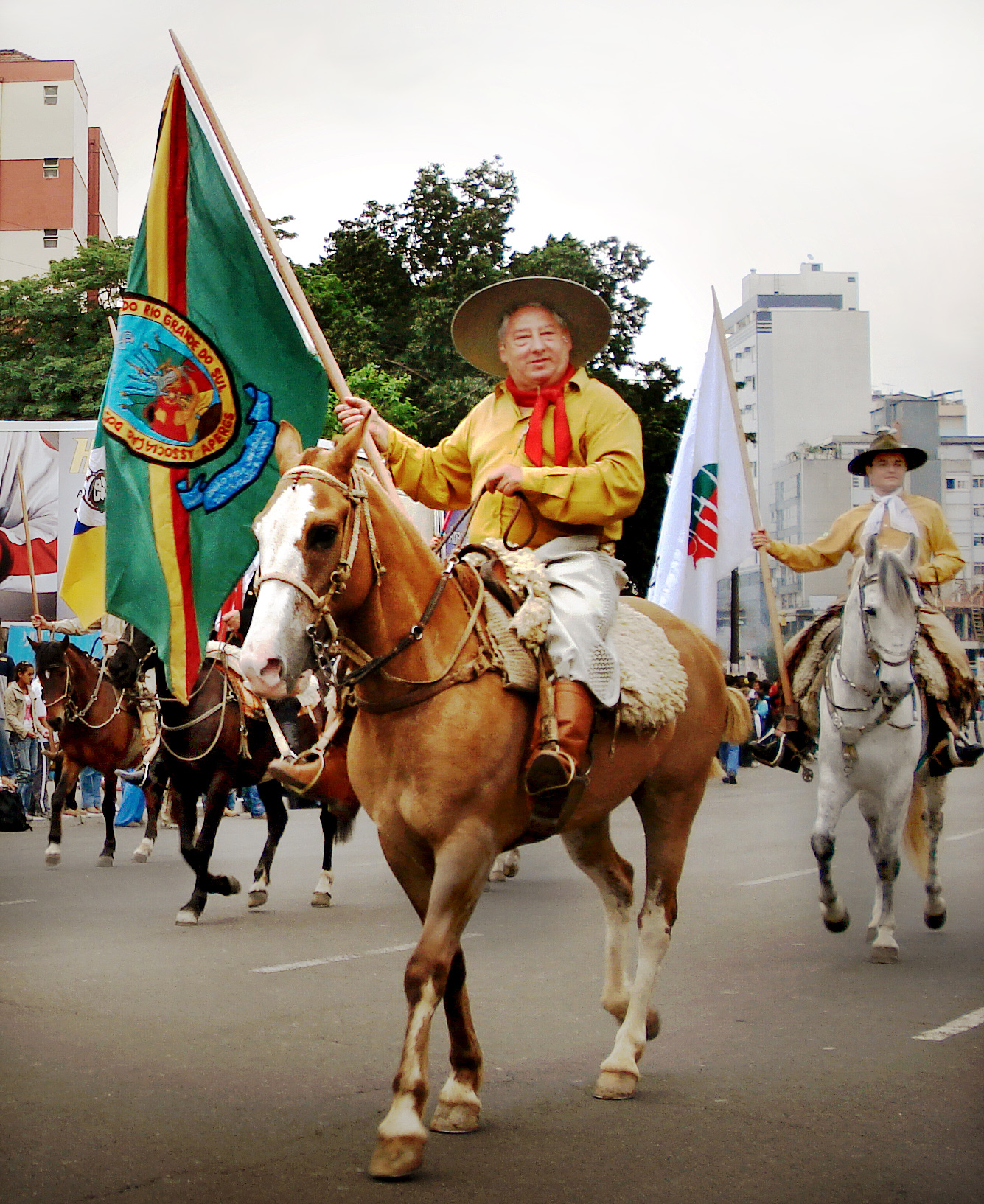
Gaucho parading in the Farroupilha Week.

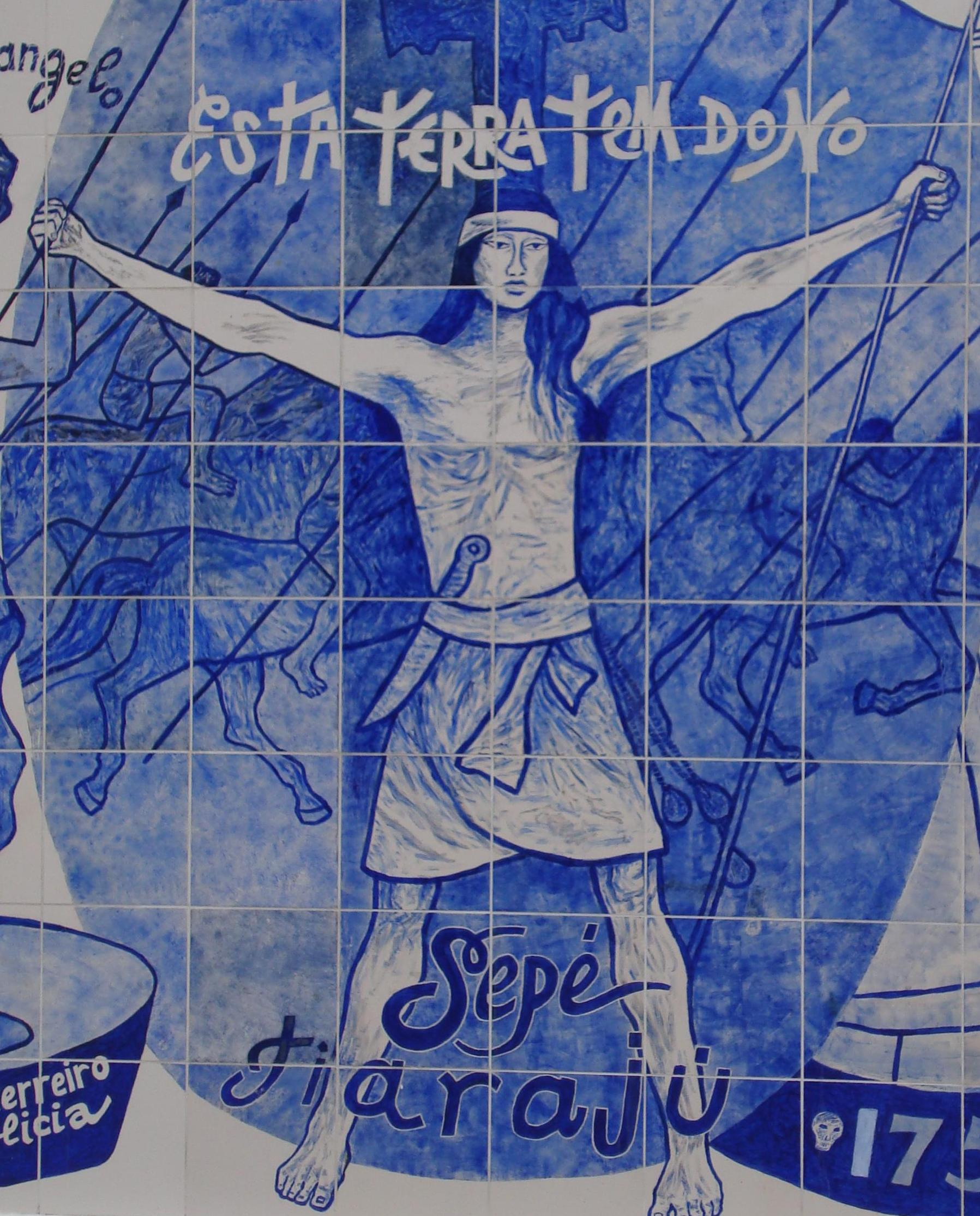
Image of Sepé Tiaraju at the Memorial of Epopeia Riograndense.

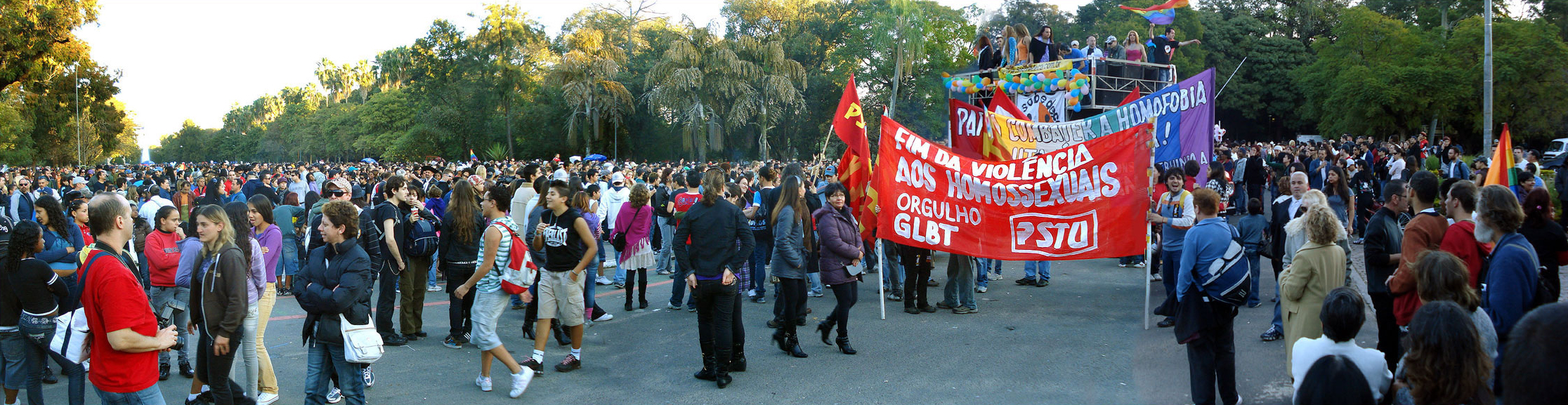
LGBT Free Parade in Porto Alegre.

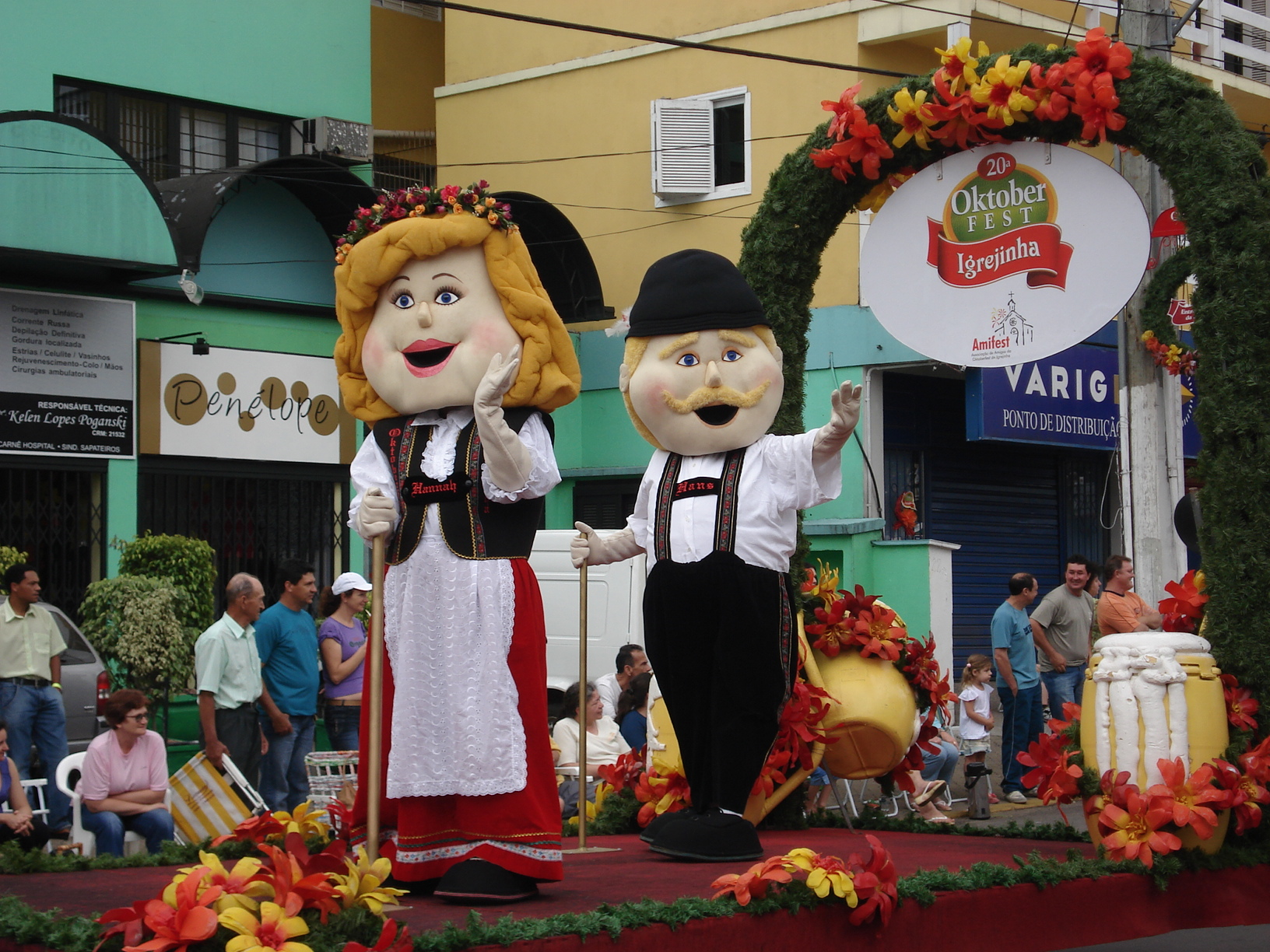
Float in the Oktoberfest of Igrejinha.

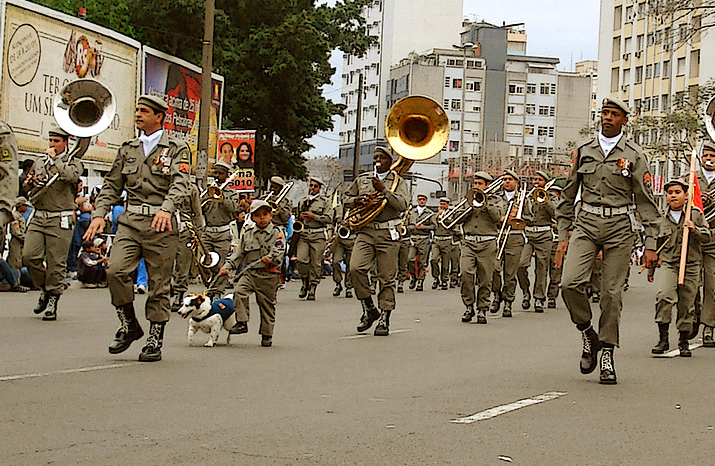
Military Brigade Band in parade in Porto Alegre

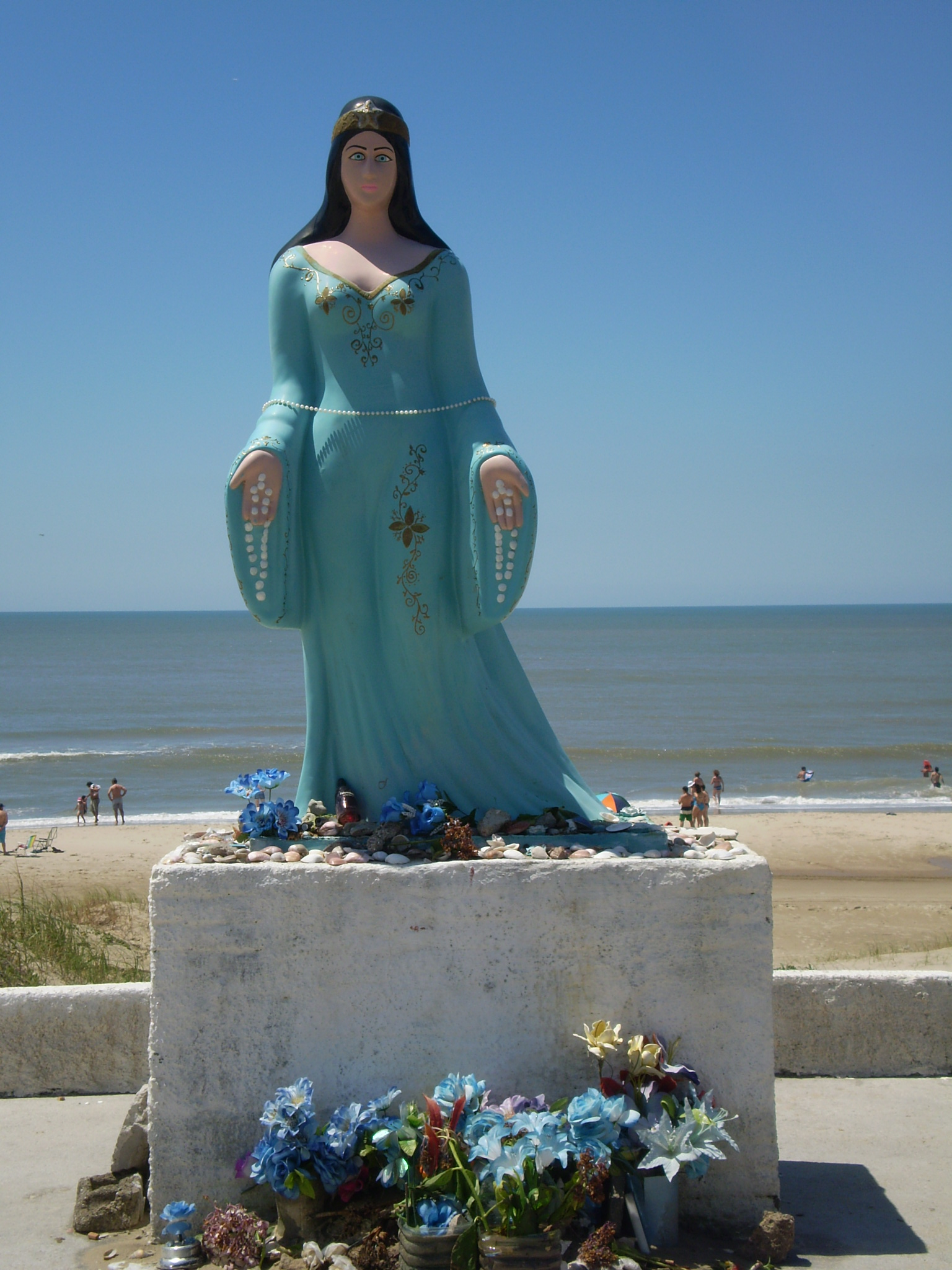
Iemanjá Statue in Barra do Chuí

== See also ==
- History of Paraná
- History of Brazil
- History of Porto Alegre
- History of Caxias do Sul
- List of municipalities in Rio Grande do Sul
- African culture in Rio Grande do Sul
- German colonization in Rio Grande do Sul
- Environmentalism in Rio Grande do Sul
- 2024 Rio Grande do Sul floods
- Historic and Geographic Institute of Rio Grande do Sul

== Bibliography ==
- Trevisan, Armindo (1978). A Escultura dos Sete Povos (in Portuguese). Porto Alegre: Movimento/IEL/INL.
- Miranda, Maria Eckert (2009). A Estalagem e o Império: crise do Antigo Regime, fiscalidade e fronteira na Província de São Pedro (1808-1831) (in Portuguese). Hucitec.
