= Painting in Rio Grande do Sul =

Artistic aspects of Rio Grande do Sul

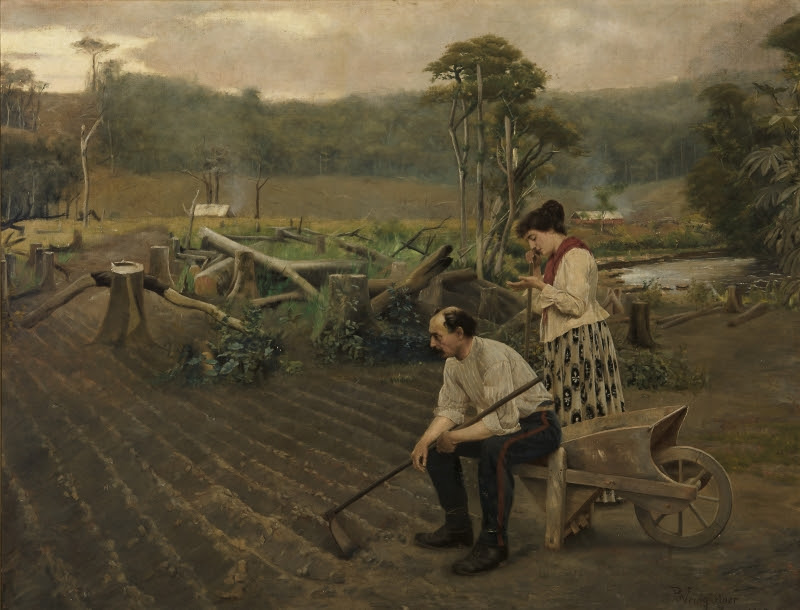
Pedro Weingärtner: Tempora mutantur, 1898, oil on canvas, MARGS collection.

Painting in Rio Grande do Sul, as an independent art, developed at the end of the 19th century. It originated in the port cities of Porto Alegre, Pelotas and Rio Grande. The first evidence of pictorial art in Rio Grande do Sul appeared as decoration for religious temples, public buildings and palaces.

Until the beginning of the 19th century, Rio Grande do Sul was an area still in the process of settlement with ill-defined borders and an incipient culture. The most significant cultural episode occurred between the 17th and 18th centuries during the Jesuit Missions in the northwest of the state, at the time under Spanish possession. The different political and military turbulences throughout the 18th and 19th centuries hindered the locals from having enough time, resources and educational bases to develop their culture.

In the 1920s, modernism began to spread, clashing with academic tradition and conservative cultural sectors, and triggering a public controversy that lasted until the 1950s. At the same time, especially through the actions of the Institute of Fine Arts, painting as an autonomous artistic genre become established and prestigious. The market developed, researchers and critics multiplied, updates from abroad were increasingly incorporated and an original character for southern production emerged for the first time. Between the 1960s and 1970s, painting in Rio Grande do Sul entered a crisis. New aesthetics emerged, such as pop art and the new figuration. Other avant-gardes that questioned the primacy of painting and the concept of a work of art also appeared. They focused on the idea, the creative process and the hybridization of different techniques and materials used in unusual combinations.

In the 1980s, painting in Rio Grande do Sul made a significant comeback, revisiting the past critically while globalizing and consecrating plurality as the typical current language. By the end of the 20th century, it had become a national reference, following national and international trends. At the same time, important artists remained unmoved by the appeals of regionalism and focused on the mythical figure of the gaucho and on historical scenes and characters. Rio Grande do Sul developed a vast and richly diversified collection of paintings, a public to appreciate them and a large group of institutions capable of studying, preserving and exhibiting them. Porto Alegre remains the most important center, while amateur painting flourishes in the countryside. There is a large bibliography on specific aspects of painting in Rio Grande do Sul, but general studies are still lacking.

== Beginning and first stage ==
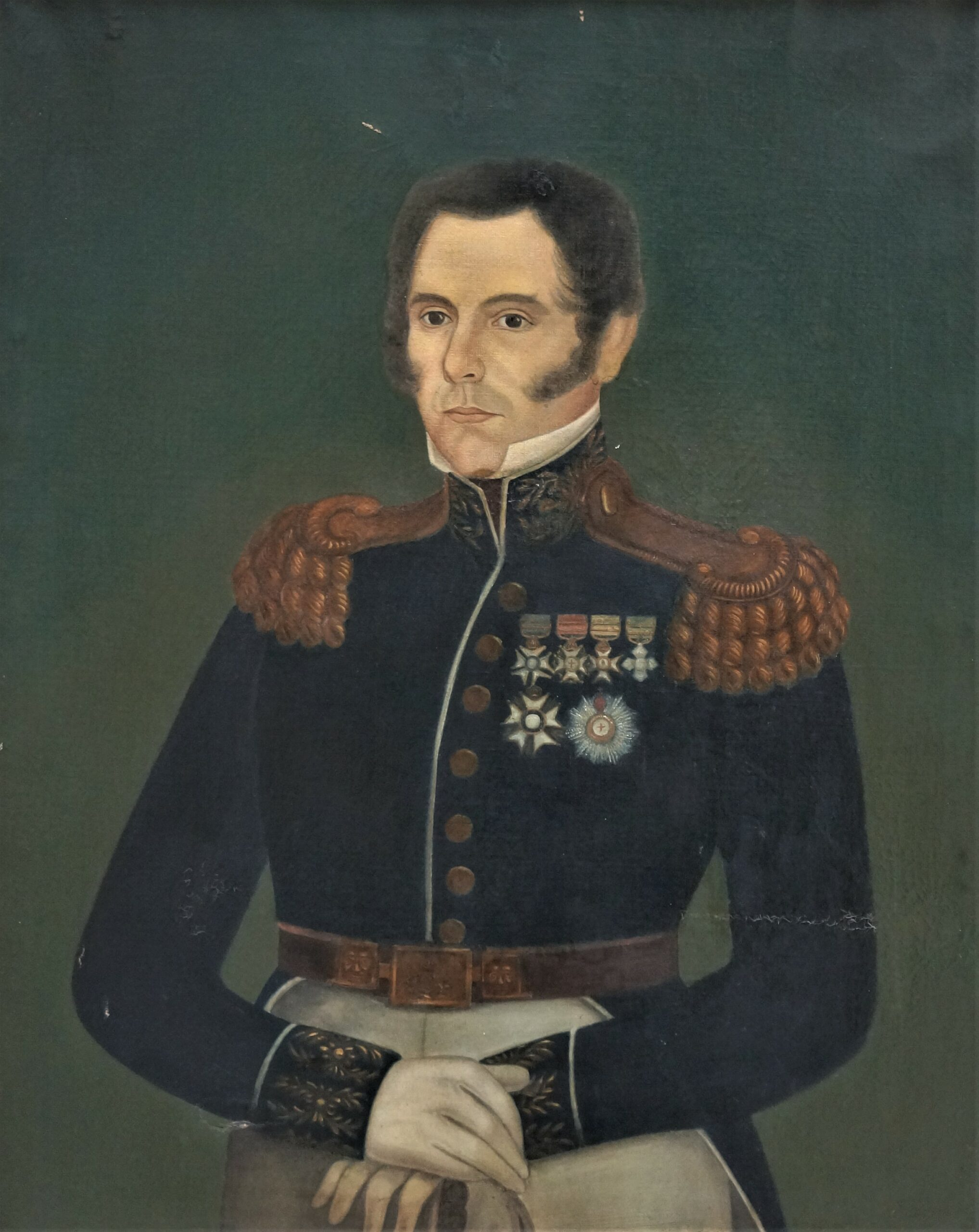
Unknown author: Portrait of Bento Gonçalves, c. 1844–46, oil on canvas, Júlio de Castilhos Museum collection.

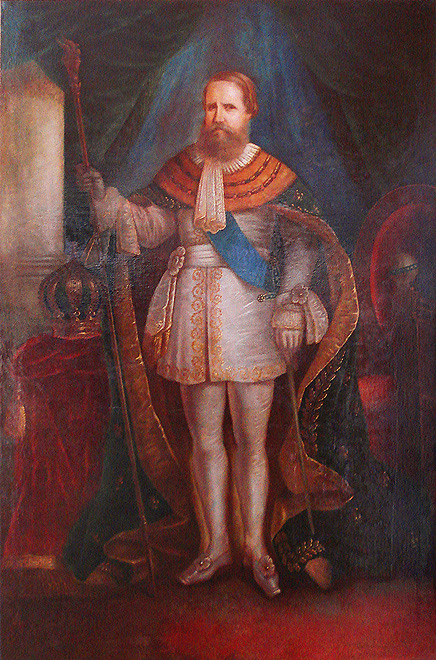
Antônio Cândido de Menezes: Portrait of Dom Pedro II, mid-19th century, oil on canvas, Júlio de Castilhos Museum collection.

Until the beginning of the 19th century, Rio Grande do Sul's history was characterized by militarism. The territory was controlled by Spain and the government's main concern was to stabilize and defend the borders. Until 1821, the most remarkable cultural event in the area was sponsored by Spanish Jesuits, who founded several missions in the central-northwestern region in the 17th century to acculturate indigenous people, which favored the creation of a hybrid culture guided by the missionaries. In Porto Alegre, there were few conditions for art to prosper, a situation that remained unchanged until the Ragamuffin War, a military incident that lasted from 1835 to 1845. The first notices about painting date back to the late 18th century and mention artisanal painters who left mural decorations in churches, although their names have not been kept.

In the middle of the 19th century, traveling artists began to arrive. They were the first to contribute to the painting of Rio Grande do Sul. The most notable were João de Deus, from São Paulo, the first famous set designer to work in the state; Alphonse Falcoz, a Frenchman who graduated from the Imperial Academy of Fine Arts; Manoel José Gentil, from Bahia; Eduardo Timoleon Zalony, who was active in Rio Grande and Porto Alegre, and introduced the technique of painting on glass; Jean-Baptiste Debret, a member of the French Mission, and Herrmann Wendroth, a German mercenary.

At the time, many people interested in art had established in Pelotas and Porto Alegre, including Guilherme Litran and Frederico Trebbi. They laid the foundations for education and the formation of a small market, and trained several disciples who would continue their legacy. However, the scene was mainly dominated by amateurism until the 1890s. The situation began to change with the work of Antônio Cândido de Menezes, the first successful painter born in the state. He graduated from the Imperial Academy of Fine Arts and worked extensively in Porto Alegre as an artist and teacher.

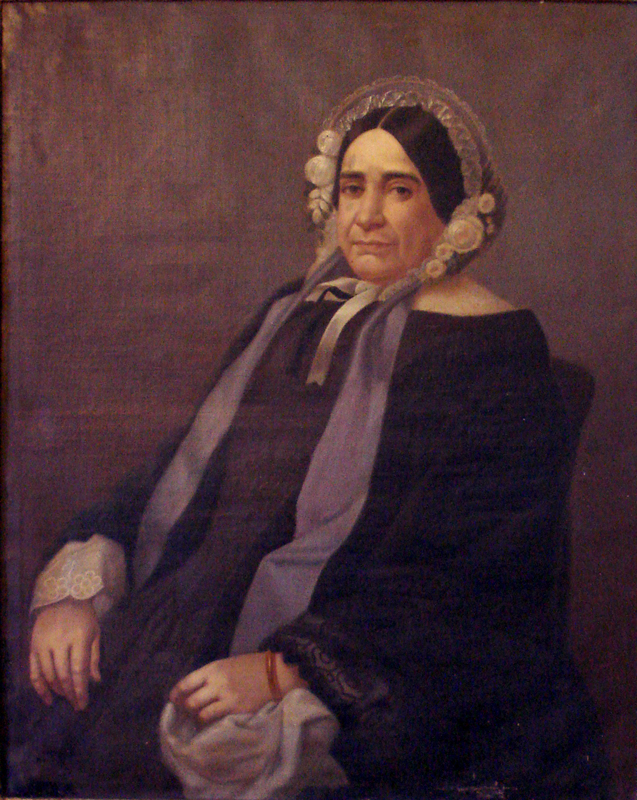
Unknown author: Benevolent member of the Beneficência Portuguesa, late 19th century, oil on canvas, Beneficência Portuguesa de Porto Alegre collection.

By the end of the 19th century, Rio Grande do Sul's economy was reasonably structured and society began to express varied interests in art, including theatrical performances, classical music, opera and literary soirees. The large influx of European immigrants provided the cultural elements to spark the first significant movements in painting, although it occurred almost exclusively in Porto Alegre. A bourgeoisie with purchasing power, who could afford to buy art and decorate their homes with murals, began to emerge. The creation of the Sociedade Partenon Literário, formed by the intellectual community of Rio Grande do Sul, and the first art salon in 1875, included in the Exposição Comercial e Industrial, where Grasselli, Menezes and Theodor Bischoff exhibited, were important. In 1883, the idea of creating a school of arts in Porto Alegre based on the European academies was proposed by set designer Oreste Coliva, but it failed.

The first generation of female painting teachers, including Edilia Azarini, Margarida Ahrons and Dorothea Alruz, emerged. At the time, women represented the majority of practitioners, whose participation in the salons was acclaimed and production approached the decorative arts and domestic gifts. A more erudite group includes the important series of official portraits of benefactors of the Beneficência Portuguesa and Santa Casa de Misericórdia. Smaller, isolated, semi-amateur figures such as Pietro Stangherlin and Antônio Cremonese also practiced painting in Caxias do Sul and Farroupilha.

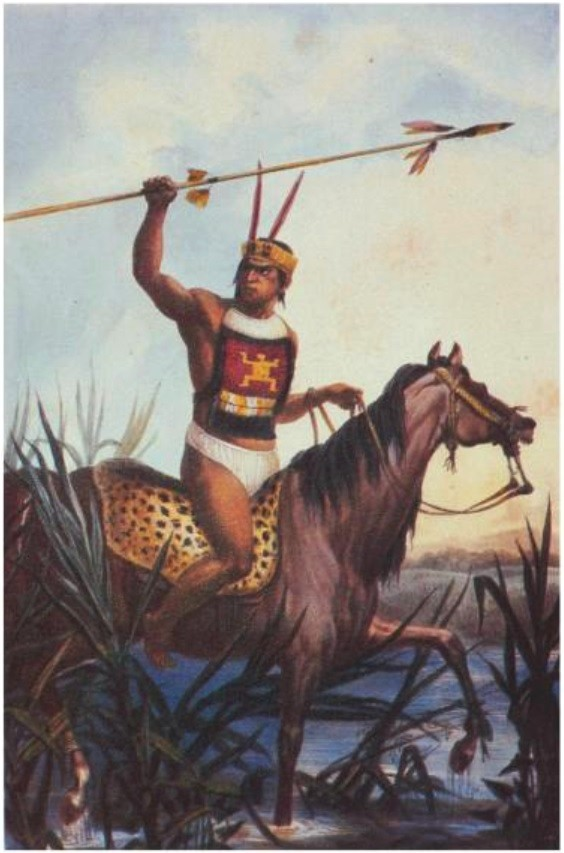
Debret: Chef de Charruas Sauvages, watercolor, c. 1822.

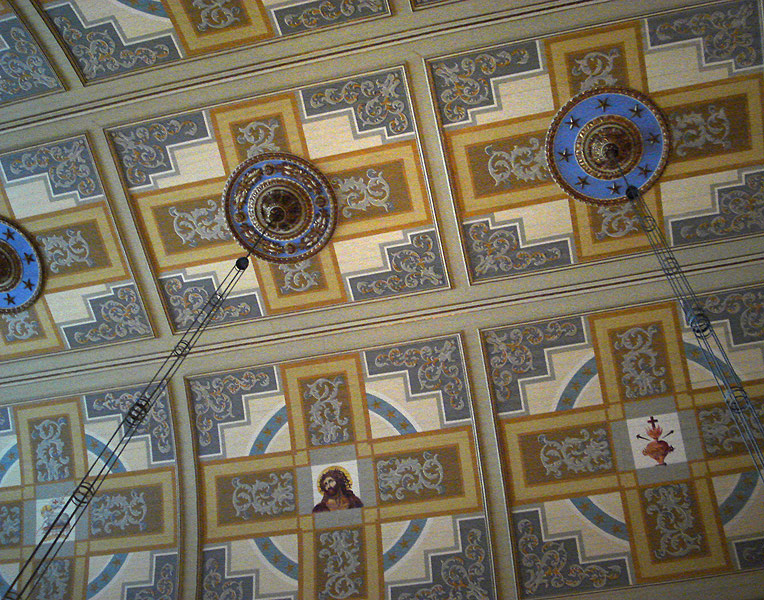
Attributed to Germano Traub: Decorative painting on the ceiling of the nave of the Church of Sorrows, second half of the 19th century.

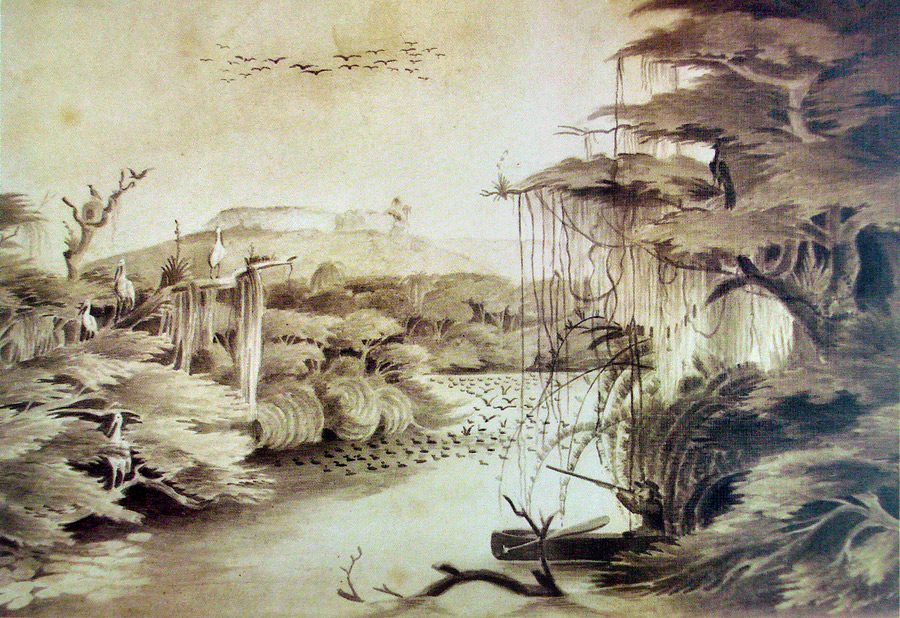
Wendroth: View of the Sinos River, aquarela, 1852.

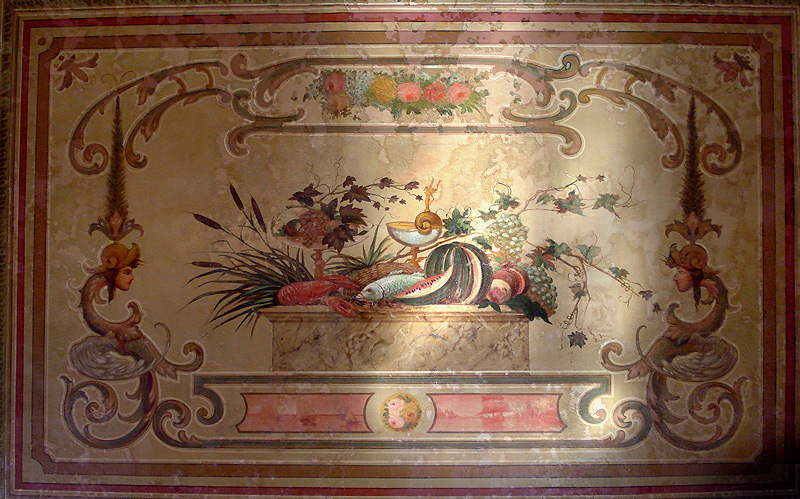
Detail of the mural decoration at the Câmara Manor House.
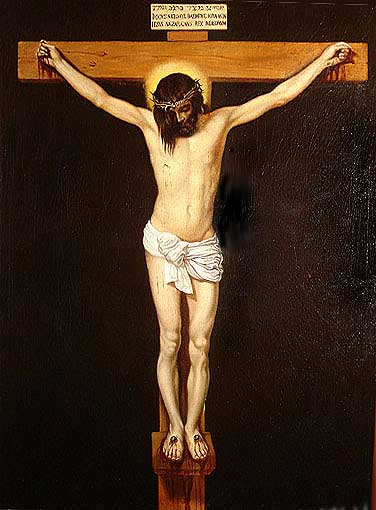
Guilherme Litran: Christ crucified, oil on canvas, second half of the 19th century, copy by Velázquez. MARGS collection.

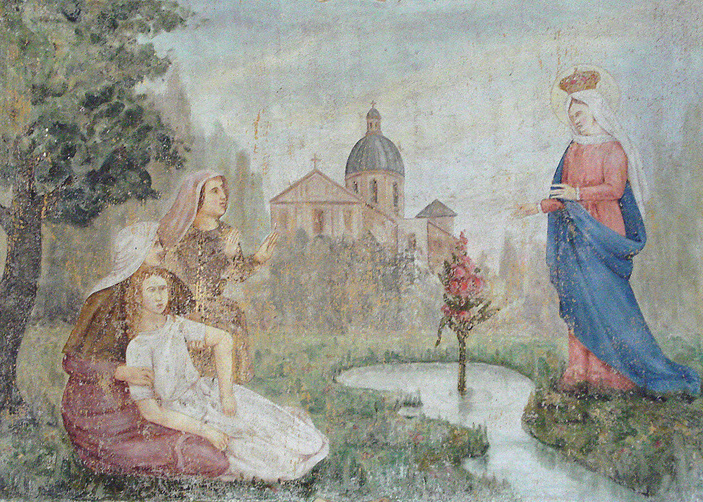
Antônio Cremonese: Miracle of Our Lady of Caravaggio, c. 1880. Main chapel of the Old Sanctuary of Our Lady of Caravaggio, Farroupilha.

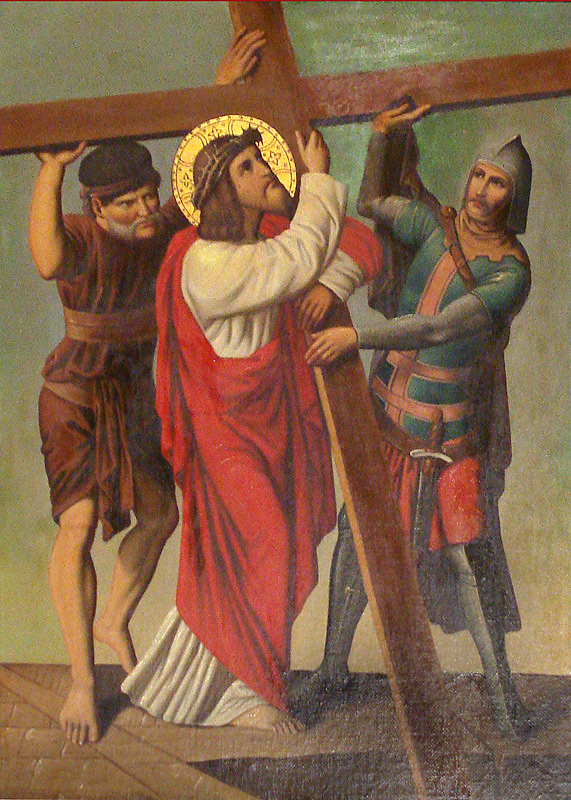
Author unknown: Jesus is helped by Simon Cyrene, oil on canvas, c. 1900, Chapel of Our Lord of the Steps of Santa Casa.

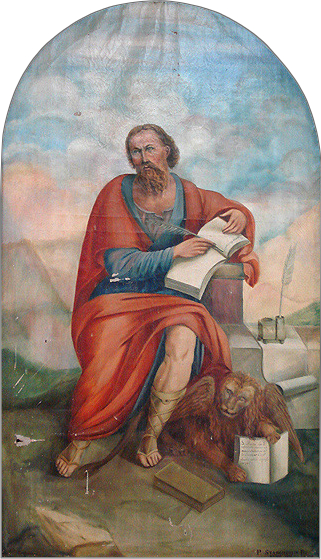
Pietro Stangherlin: St. Mark the Evangelist, 1890, oil on canvas, Municipal Museum of Caxias do Sul.

== Creation of an identity ==
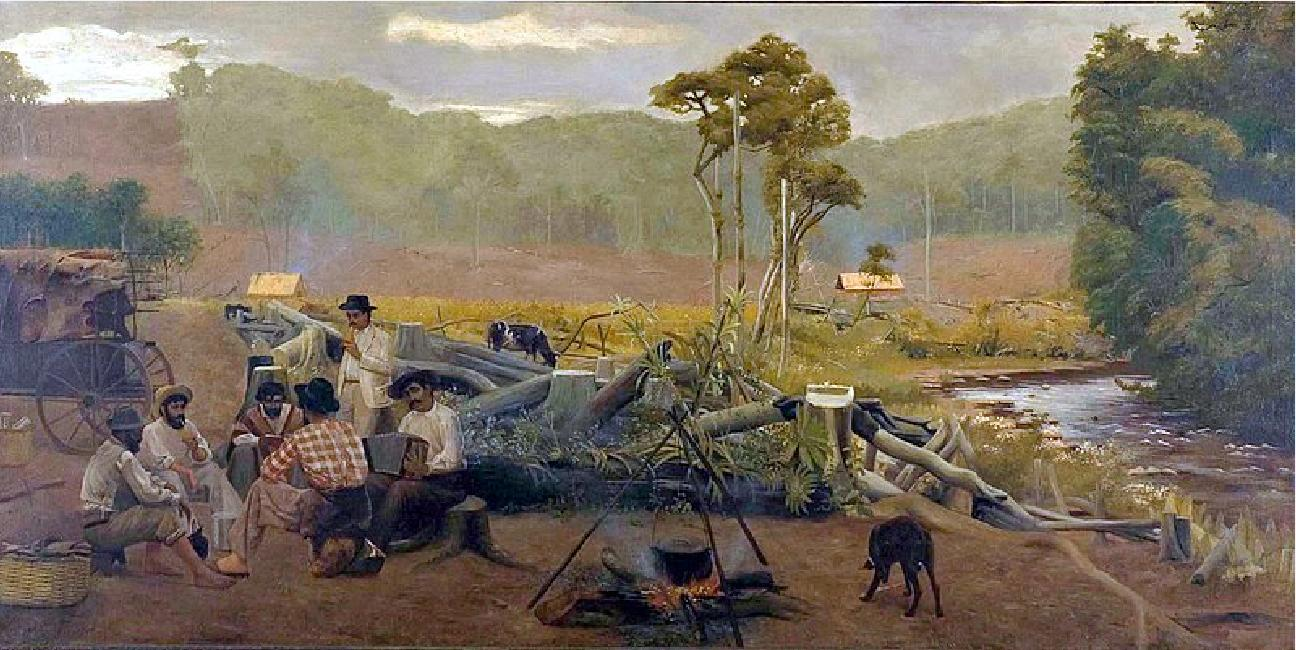
Pedro Weingärtner: Carreteiros gauchos chimarreando, oil on canvas, 1911. Aldo Locatelli Art Gallery.

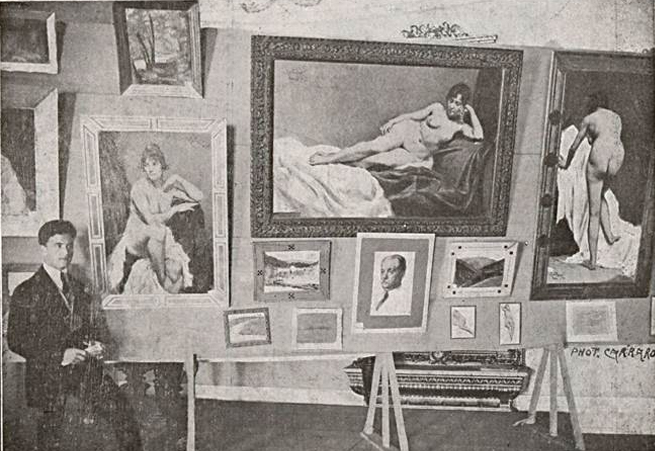
Exhibition by Leopoldo Gotuzzo at the Clube do Comércio in Porto Alegre in 1919.

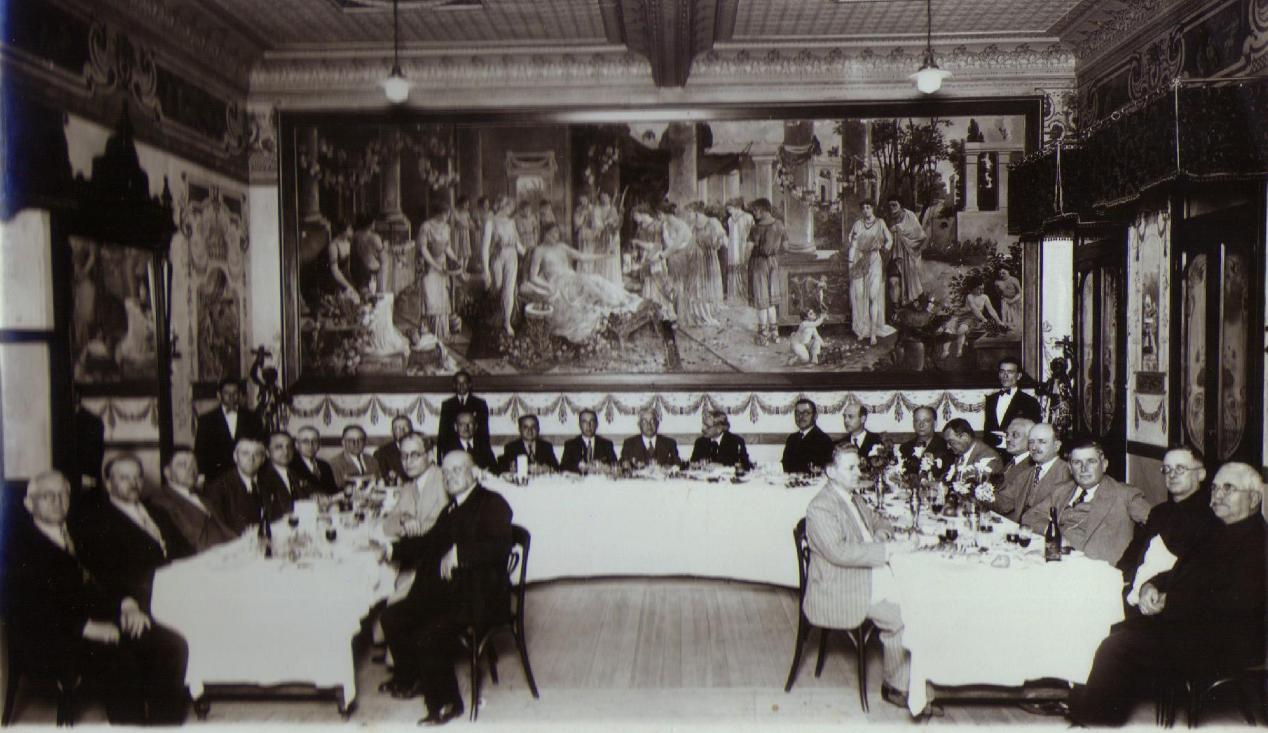
Banquet at the Rocco Confectionery showing decorative paintings and a large academic scene by Ferdinand Schlatter with a mythological motif, c. 1920–1930.

From the end of the 19th century, native painters emerged, such as Augusto Luiz de Freitas, author of monumental canvases, and Pedro Weingärtner, the greatest figure of the first generation of painters from Rio Grande do Sul. Weingärtner trained in Europe and developed an internationally renowned career until the 1920s. He worked on a wide variety of themes, such as genre scenes, mythological scenes, landscapes and regionalist scenes. Weingärtner and Freitas pursued the traditions of great academic painting, combining neoclassical, realist and romantic references.

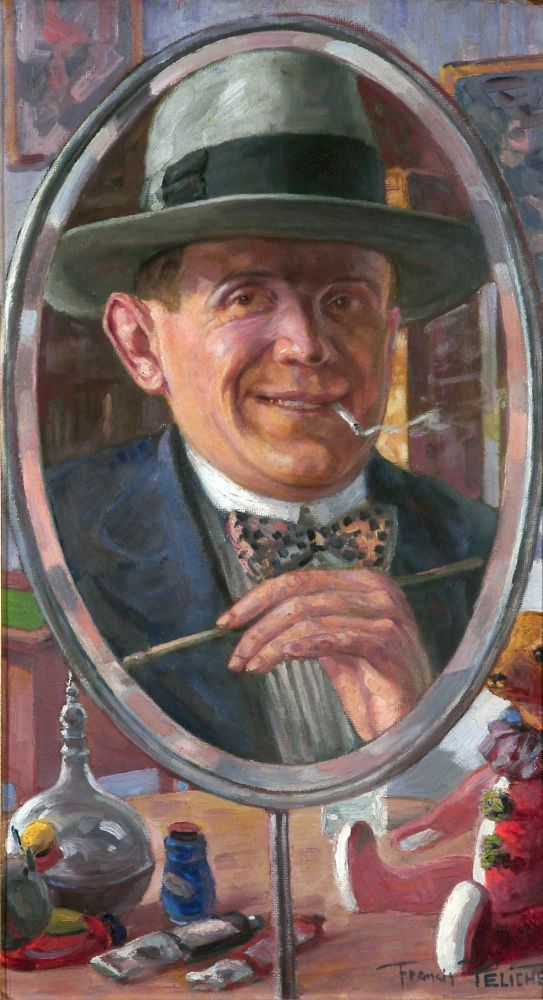
Francis Pelichek: Self-portrait, Barão de Santo Ângelo Art Gallery

Positivism also influenced the arts in Rio Grande do Sul by pursuing progress and democracy in order to achieve a significant and peaceful social life. The arts were valued as an instrument of social education, but the system was precarious. There were no art museums or structured academies; in 1893 the first gallery in Porto Alegre opened as a separate room in the Ao Preço Fixo bazaar. Despite the limited support structure and the small market, the press regularly reported the novelties in painting. At the time, Porto Alegre counted hundreds of painters, both professional and amateur. Many offered classes and private schools provided an introduction to the basic techniques of painting and drawing, while decorative mural painting in homes and public buildings became fashionable. Painting became known and appreciated. Dozens of painters, many from the countryside, participated in the 1901 exhibition in Porto Alegre.

The next generation of artists was born in the 1800s, but their work flourished in the first decades of the following century. Oscar Boeira, Afonso Silva, Libindo Ferrás and João Fahrion joined the group. Foreign artists such as Eugenio Latour, Francis Pelichek and Luiz Maristany de Trias also made significant contributions. Leopoldo Gotuzzo exhibited in Porto Alegre but pursued most of his career in Rio de Janeiro. Their distinctive feature was their ability to assimilate important lessons from impressionism, evident especially in the work of Boeira and Maristany. They eased the academic rigor in drawing and the organization of space, using the stain as an expressive resource and showing a new sensitivity to the effects of light, which prepared the way for the more radical innovations of the moderns.

In 1903, the first event entirely dedicated to the plastic arts, promoted by Gazeta do Commercio and featuring Weingärtner, Romualdo Prati, Francesco Manna, Augusto de Freitas and Libindo Ferrás, occurred. According to Damasceno, it was "the first event to grant the arts of Rio Grande do Sul an autonomous status, [...] legitimizing them as an object of social approval and distinction".

=== Institute of Fine Arts ===
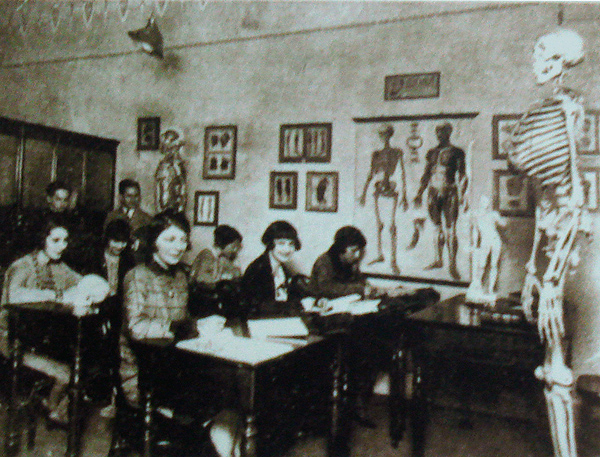
Anatomy class at the institute led by Libindo Ferrás, 1928

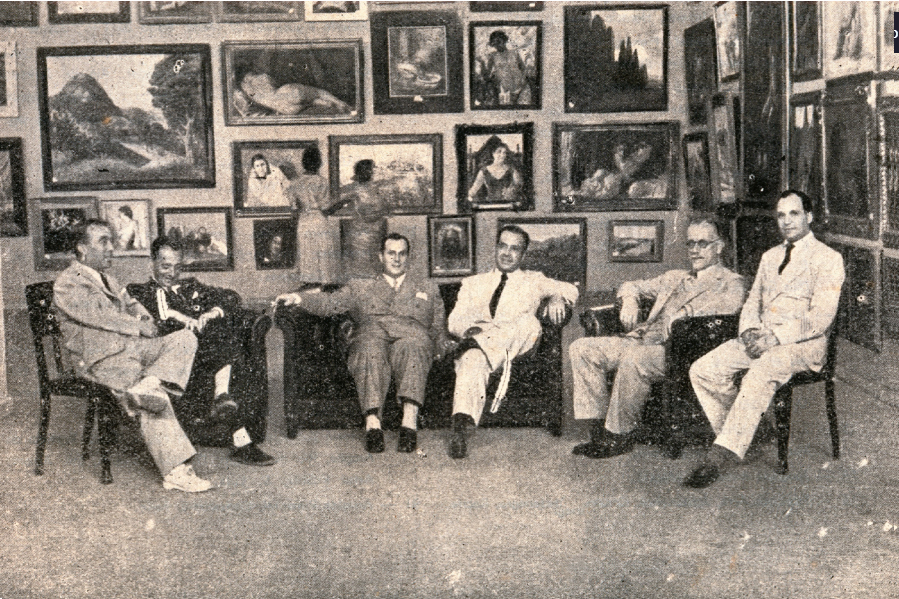
Members of the jury of the II Salon of the Institute of Fine Arts, 1941

In 1908, the prestige of the plastic arts among official and cultural elite circles led to the foundation of the Free Institute of Fine Arts, later the Institute of Fine Arts (IBA), predecessor of the current Institute of Arts at UFRGS, which concentrated the production of erudite art in Porto Alegre and was the most significant institutional reference in Rio Grande do Sul until the mid-1950s regarding the study, teaching and production of painting. For a long time, the place remained the stronghold of academicism due to the connection with the government and the conservative elite. Researcher Círio Simon, who compiled the history of the institution, stated that "it was created by art amateurs as the culmination of the civilizing project formed by the free higher education schools that were the origin of the first university in the region", but soon professionals joined in and "assumed their role as agents, beginning to express the autonomy of art, taking advantage of their institutional place".

Despite the promotional role played by the IBA, prejudice against professional artists remained strong. The classes were seen as leisure or social adornment by society. Although the Painting program had been planned since the IBA's creation, it was approved in 1926. The institution's orientation applied criteria derived from the traditional 19th century schools and the connection with the state government remained intact. Libindo and Pelichek taught painting at the institute until the 1930s, including special guests such as Weingärtner, Boeira and Torelly.

== Modernism ==
=== Beginning ===
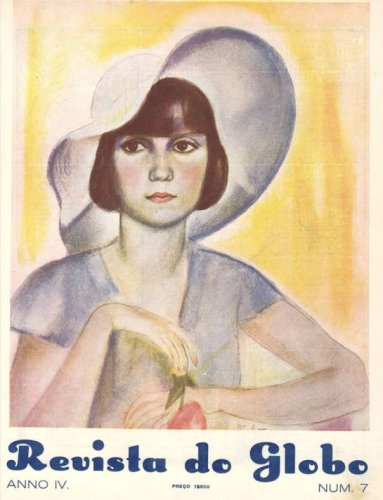
Cover of Revista do Globo with illustration by Francis Pelichek, year IV no. 7, 1932.

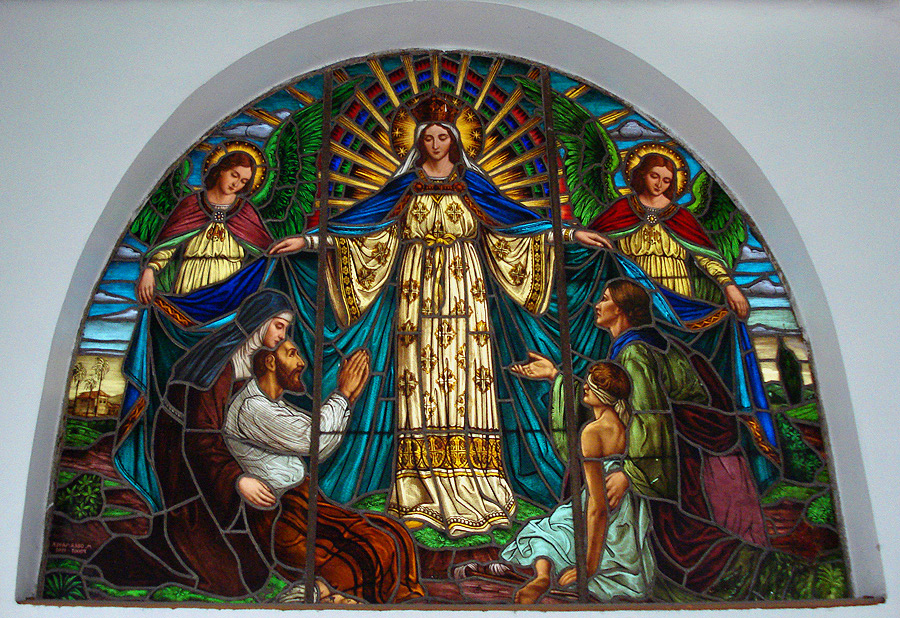
Casa Genta stained glass window at Santa Casa in Porto Alegre.

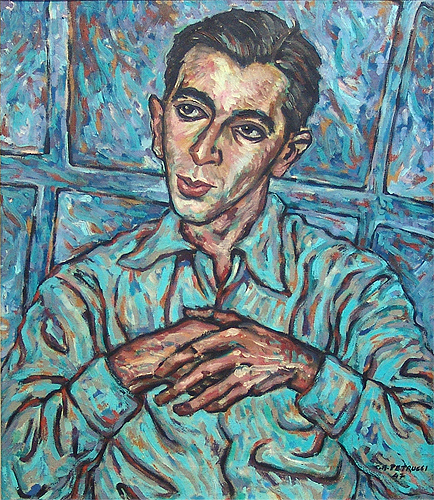
Carlos Petrucci: Portrait of José Lewgoy, 1947, oil on canvas, MARGS collection.

The relative isolation and peculiar characteristics of Rio Grande do Sul's economy and cultural background created the conditions for the renewal of modernism to proceed in a different way. In the state, the synthesis between 19th century academic schools and positivist ideological painting was considered the most modern art, while the schools of the international avant-garde, such as expressionism and cubism, were gradually introduced through the illustrations published in magazines such as Máscara, Revista do Globo and Revista Kodak. The graphic arts were a good alternative market for the more inquisitive painters of the time. Photography also contributed to the development of a new approach to painting, as reflected in Weingärtner and other portrait painters who were active at the time.

Other signs of modernization emerged through the influence of João Fahrion, who had returned from training in Europe, where he frequented the avant-garde and became a respected illustrator and teacher. Helios Seelinger's presence in Porto Alegre also gathered a group of artists, leading to the conception of the 1924 Autumn Salon, which would publicly open the debate between tradition and modernity and establish a local link with the renewal movements occurring in Brazil's central region. Weingärtner's last exhibition happened in 1925, but despite being well received by the press, the reviews mentioned the overall changes. The number of visitors was low and the show closed early without many sales. The painted stained glass windows produced by Casa Genta and Casa Veit became popular and were used in banks, town halls, homes, schools and churches. The field, as well as traditional sacred painting, is still little studied.

Official institutions and the general public opposed the bolder and more challenging manifestations of the modern era. The society of Rio Grande do Sul developed on an agricultural model, maintained mainly by landowners who had no interest in changing the situation. Commerce and industry were beginning to become economically important forces, but their principles were equally conservative. Modernism delayed establishing a presence in Rio Grande do Sul and only became a dominant force decades later. Encouraged by the Rio-grandense Republican Party and expressed in literature and the plastic arts, a local mythology began to be formulated about the figure of the gaucho, an artificially constructed stereotype that synthesized the local ethnic differences and generated a cultural cohesion capable of driving the state forward politically on the national scene. A symbol of identity, freedom, courage and virility, the gaucho, who is also a typical representative of conservatism, founded a symbolic identity that still has wide popular appeal and defines many public actions.

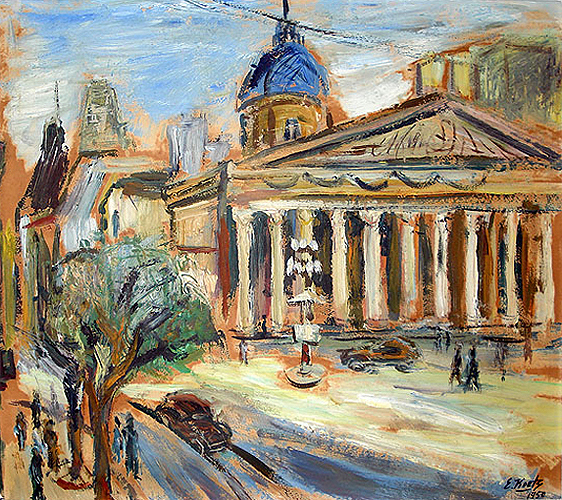
Edgar Koetz: Cathedral of Buenos Aires, 1950, oil on canvas, MARGS collection.

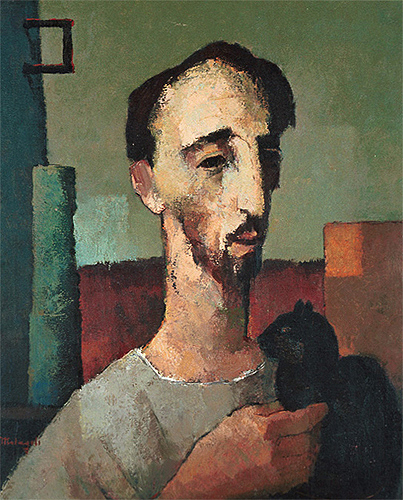
Ado Malagoli: The black cat, 1954, oil on canvas, MARGS collection,

In 1936, when Libindo Ferrás moved to Rio de Janeiro, the Institute of Fine Arts was incorporated into the University of Porto Alegre. In 1939, the curriculum was expanded and reformed, and João Fahrion, José Lutzenberger, Luiz Maristany de Trias became professors. In the same year, a salon was organized with the participation of national artists, especially teachers from the National School of Fine Arts, which promoted the dissemination of local art in the center of Brazil. Another incentive emerged with the founding of the Associação Riograndense de Artes Plásticas Francisco Lisboa in 1938, formed mainly by artists who were dissatisfied with the established art system. They also created an annual salon of great tradition, whose partners were Carlos Scliar, Guido Mondin and Carlos Alberto Petrucci. Exhibitions were proliferating in the city, despite still being held in stores and banks.

Throughout the 1930s and 1940s, painting of Rio Grande do Sul gained credibility and the consumer market grew. There was also an intensification of the theoretical-ideological debate between the supporters of modernism and those who defended the traditional schools. Art criticism, still incipient and relatively amateurish, despite praising the innovative spirit of the modernists, still adhered to humanist criteria inherited from the 19th century based on supposedly perennial values in art and regional symbolism. Ângelo Guido and Aldo Obino, two of the most important art critics of the time, heavily attacked the modernists, basing their opinions on the alleged negative moral effects that art had on the public. For them, modernist art was subversive, deformed, superficial, unpleasant and disseminated values that threatened the established social order, while academism was seen as a style that provided aesthetic pleasure due to the fidelity to ideal models of perfection and plastically represented a peaceful and harmonious social model. In 1942, some members of the Associação Francisco Lisboa signed an anti-modernist manifesto, accusing the moderns of being a destructive influence on society and local traditions, due to their alleged affiliation with socialism and their lack of ethical and Christian values. They created the Modern Fine Arts Salon to mark their protest, which was organized to ridicule modern art.

A more consistent defense of modernism came from Manoelito de Ornellas, who had participated in the Verde-Amarelo Group, and organized the Newcomers' Salon in 1944, through the State Department of Press and Propaganda, with the aim of stimulating avant-garde research. At the same time, Scliar, one of the most active proponents of aesthetic renewal, along with Manoel Martins, stood out with the first works with a social background. Other artists active at this time were Benito Castañeda, João Faria Vianna, Edgar Koetz and Gastão Hofstetter; the last two were linked to the illustration workshop of Revista do Globo, where Ernest Zeuner was a key figure, creating an important school of graphic artists.

=== Consolidation ===
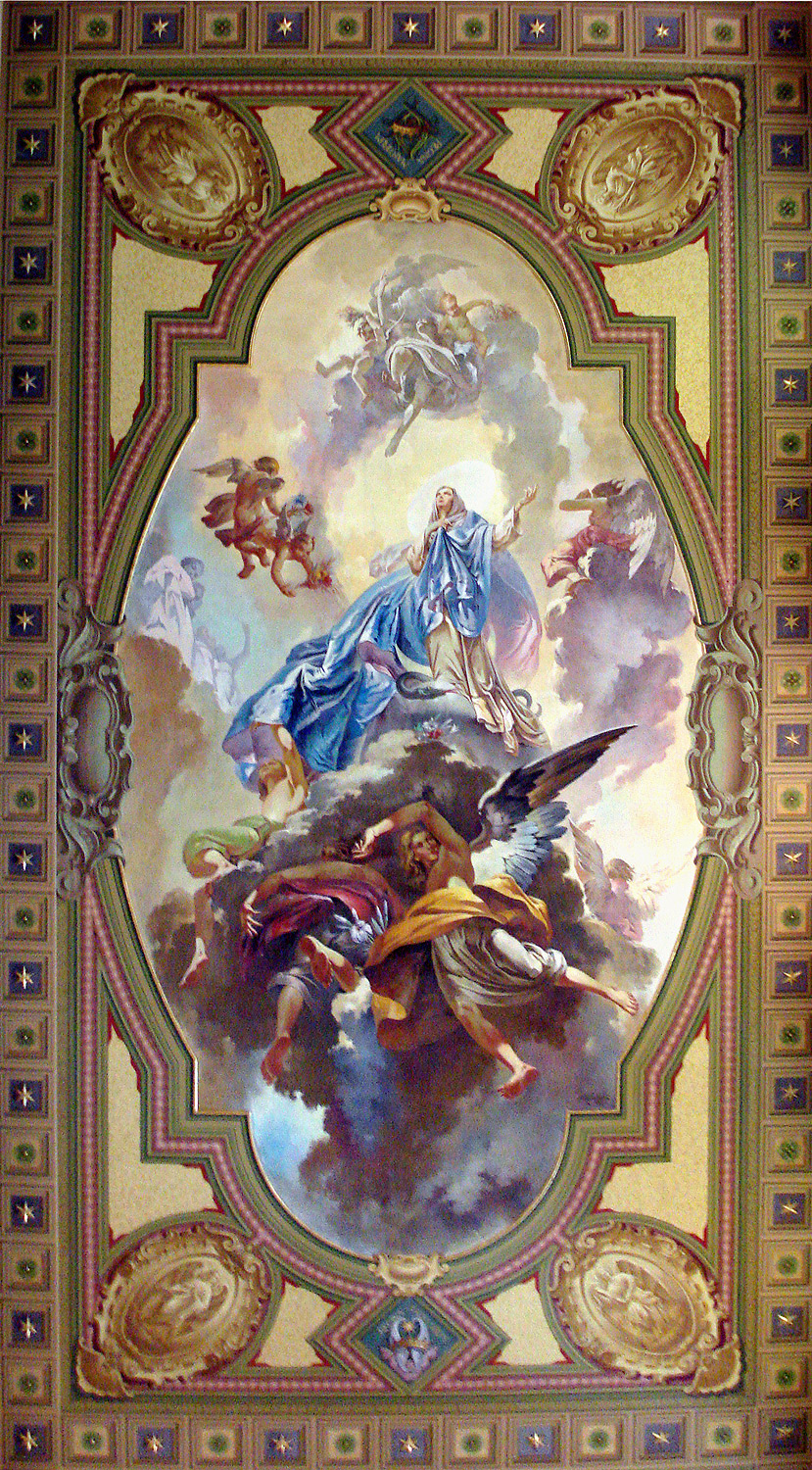
Aldo Locatelli: Ascension of Mary, ceiling of the Cathedral of Santa Maria.

In the 1950s, Porto Alegre consolidated its leadership of the state in artistic matters. Society had more access to education and information, IBA renewed the teaching staff and artists received more respect. In Pelotas, the School of Fine Arts was founded, the salons expanded, the first important galleries appeared, abstract painting experiments began with Paulo Flores and Glauco Rodrigues, and two new presences had a major impact on the art scene: Ado Malagoli and Aldo Locatelli. In 1954, the Rio Grande do Sul Museum of Art (MARGS) was created.

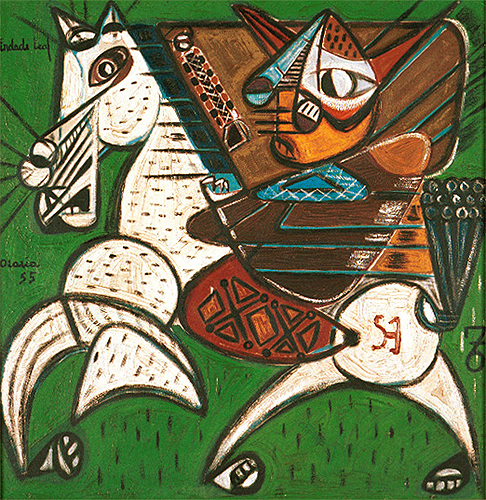
Geraldo Trindade Leal: Ginete, 1955, oil on canvas, MARGS collection.

Malagoli came from São Paulo to teach at the IBA and took over as head of the Culture Division of the State Education Department, where he guided the state's public art education, and as head of the Museum of Art. At MARGS, he acquired the first group of paintings for the museum's collection using state funds. His approach was progressive and the first art exhibitions promoted by the museum favored modern art. He invited painters such as Portinari, Frank Schaeffer, Di Cavalcanti, Manabu Mabe and Tikashi Fukushima. As a teacher, he assembled a team of talented painters known as the Núcleo Malagoli, whose influence lasted until the 1970s, especially on Rubens Cabral, Alice Soares, Alice Brueggemann, Joel Amaral, Regina Silveira, Fabrício Marques Soares, Iná Fantoni, Paulo Porcella, Suelly Kelling, Nelson Wiegert, Maria Lídia Magliani and Marilene Pieta.

Locatelli brought from Italy the muralist tradition derived from Michelangelo, also influenced by Piero della Francesca and the Italian Futurists, such as Umberto Boccioni. He also taught at the IBA, where he tried to develop in his students an appreciation for idealistic art with a social function. He created works such as the sacred decoration of the Church of San Pelegrino in Caxias do Sul, the Cathedral of Our Lady of the Conception in Santa Maria and the regionalist panels in the Piratini Palace. He and Emilio Sessa, his collaborator, were great exponents of mural and religious painting in the state, genres rarely practiced in Brazil.

In the 1950s, there was an affirmation of regionalism, which had national repercussions through the graphic arts, the activities of the Bagé Group and the Bagé and Porto Alegre engraving clubs. Danúbio Gonçalves, Plínio Bernhardt, Glênio Bianchetti and Glauco Rodrigues were printmakers and painters who called their painting "terrorist, absurd and without technique", typifying the more experimental modernism. The group's activity influenced others such as Carlos Alberto Petrucci, as well as contributing to greater general acceptance of modernist principles.

At the end of the 1950s, with modernism established and without opposition from the IBA, which had been the academic stronghold, official efforts turned to the goal of bringing Rio Grande do Sul up to national standards, such as São Paulo and Rio de Janeiro. In 1958, a Brazilian Arts Congress was held with the participation of Pietro Maria Bardi, Quirino Campofiorito, Mário Pedrosa, Sérgio Milliet to debate a variety of topics. There was also the Pan-American Salon, whose aim was to emulate the São Paulo International Art Biennial. However, the local possibilities were overestimated and the project didn't continue. Other artists emerging during this period were Geraldo Trindade Leal, Vitorio Gheno, Yeddo Titze, Sobragil, Edy Carollo and José de Francesco. Neiva Bohns summarized the conditions of Rio Grande do Sul art at the end of the 1950s as follows:

In the 1950s, the most diverse tendencies came together, not always peacefully, in the same territory, and in the same period of time: artists and teachers with a classical-academic background were still active, while modernists from different factions were settling in more and more solidly. Contesting both, and displeasing everyone, more radical manifestations began to emerge that would lead, a short time later, to the dissolution of the boundaries between artistic languages and the contestation of the institutions that consecrated art and artists. In other words, when Rio Grande do Sul was finally able to boast of having an "art system" in the process of consolidation, made up of schools, museums, galleries, critics and a buying public, the art that was being produced was already fundamentally contesting the validity of these institutions.

=== Other centers ===
In 1922, Santa Maria created a School of Arts and Crafts, where Frederico Lobe and Salvatore Parlagreco taught. In 1963, the University of Santa Maria launched the Faculty of Fine Arts, attracting students from all over the region. Eduardo Trevisan, besides being a painter, was one of the founders of the Municipal Institute of Culture.

Since 1949, Pelotas had an active School of Fine Arts supported by Locatelli and Emilio Sessa, which was later annexed to the University of Pelotas. In 1967, the University of Caxias do Sul incorporated the painting course offered for some years by the City Hall. Locatelli made an impression in Caxias do Sul when he created several billboards in the city. These centers showed conservative tendencies and catered to a small audience, but they were already the basis of regional centers for the teaching, production and consumption of art. The other cities in the state offered little in this field; their most promising talents, such as Glauco Pinto de Moraes, from Passo Fundo, and Iberê Camargo, from Restinga Seca, sought education and training in Porto Alegre.

== Decline of modernism and new avant-gardes ==
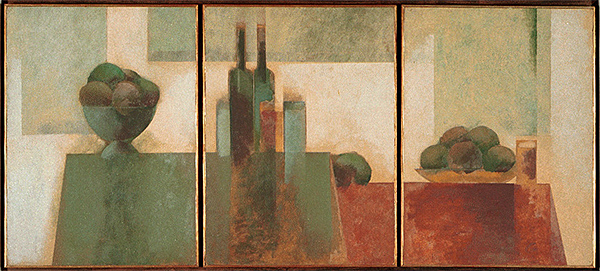
Carlos Scliar: Still life, 1960, waxed tempera on canvas, MARGS collection.

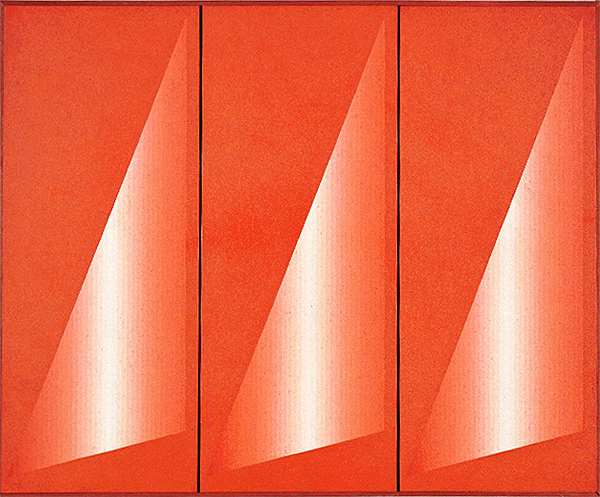
Jader Siqueira: Triptych I, 1977, oil on canvas, MARGS collection.

The 1960s witnessed the real modernization of painting in Rio Grande do Sul and the beginning of individualization and the affirmation of specific characteristics. According to Marilene Pieta, overcoming the inconsistency of previous research and the continuous oscillation between progressive and outdated formal models, the avant-garde, previously marginalized, "forces social endorsement and awaits the new artistic status that will allow its aesthetic project to be permeated and absorbed by society."

In 1961, Iberê began a cycle of lectures and painting classes at the Porto Alegre City Hall's Atelier Livre, commercial galleries sprang up and abstractionism gained popularity with Flores, Iberê, Titze, Rodrigues, Petrucci, Ênio Lippmann and Suelly Kelling. Despite official funding, the institutions were still lacking in many aspects. The tensions between tradition and modernity had not settled completely and limited the expansion and self-sustainability of the market, which was small and restricted almost exclusively to Porto Alegre.

The 1960s and 1970s witnessed an upsurge in cultural movement, especially in Porto Alegre, the main center of progress and debate. New aesthetics, such as conceptual art, concretism, pop art and new figuration, emerged in the state during international conflicts. New artists appeared, such as Leo Fuhro, Jader Siqueira, Léo Dexheimer, Carlos Carrion de Britto Velho, Antônio Soriano, Paulo Peres, Clara Pechansky, Nelson Jungbluth, Cláudio Carriconde and Waldeny Elias. Pedro Escosteguy is also notable for being the pioneer of Brazilian conceptual art, although he worked for most of his career in the center of Brazil.

The new aesthetics gave additional impetus to research into new plastic forms and languages and new means of expression. Following the international movement, hybrid works incorporating techniques, procedures and materials alien to traditional painting appeared. The subject matter diversifies and begins to address problems of the big city and politics; the human body is often portrayed in ways that are not flattering or ideal and becomes a support for painting, and the whole system of education, production, signification and circulation of art is questioned. During this period, an interest in the process developed to the detriment of the product. These aspects were further developed by artists linked to the KVHR Group, the Nervo Óptico Group and Espaço N.O. at the end of the 1970s, who ventured into radical innovation.

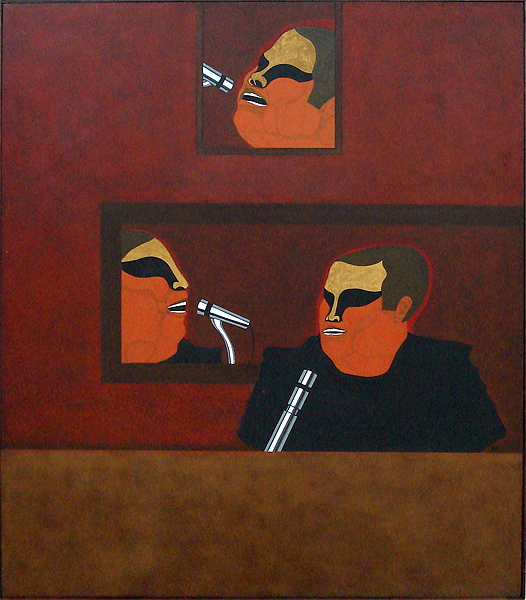
Britto Velho: Painting No. 2, 1977, acrylic on canvas, MARGS collection

Despite the emergence of new horizons regarding research after the military regime was established in 1964, artists perceive a regression in other areas. A major achievement was the consolidation of Atelier Livre as an alternative space for the creation and study of painting and other arts. Originating from lectures given by Iberê Camargo in 1961, it began its activities as a painting studio at the top of the Public Market, but in 1978 it was installed in new, spacious and equipped premises. It was a free and very democratic space of intense activity with workshops, theaters and courses for various artistic techniques that served as a school for many prominent names and as an alternative to the official education, with more restricted access, offered by the Institute of Arts at UFRGS. Ana Alegria, Regina Ohlweiler, Fernando Baril, Paulo Porcella, Danúbio Gonçalves, Henrique Fuhro, Vera Wildner and Britto Velho, all important names in Rio Grande do Sul painting, studied there.

In the 1970s, the Visual Arts Salon of the Institute of Arts at UFRGS was created, where abstraction gained official recognition. The creation of the Ernesto Frederico Scheffel Foundation in Novo Hamburgo, which houses the large collection of Ernesto Frederico Scheffel, is a unique case in the state. Naïve painters such as Paulina Eizirik, Otaciano Arantes, Maria di Gesù, Carlos Alberto Oliveira and Olegário Triunfo also appeared, while Carlos Mancuso and Nathanael Guimarães made their mark as watercolorists.

== Postmodernism ==
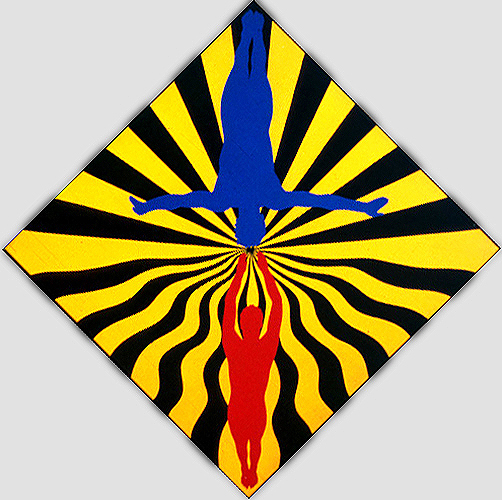
Milton Kurtz: Quasi contacto, 1989, acrylic on canvas, MARGS collection.

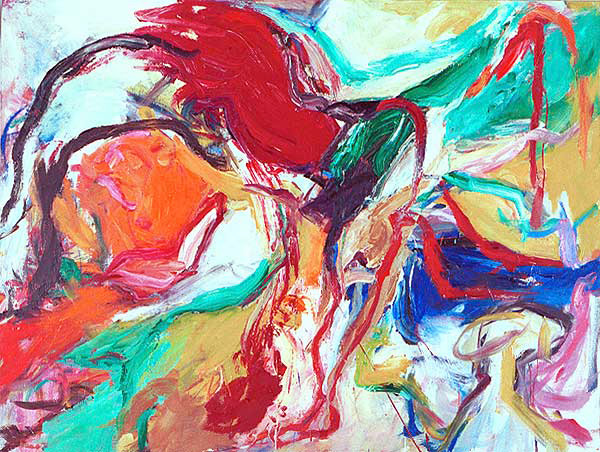
Regina Ohlweiler: The first flight of the blue bird, oil on canvas, 1990, MARGS collection.

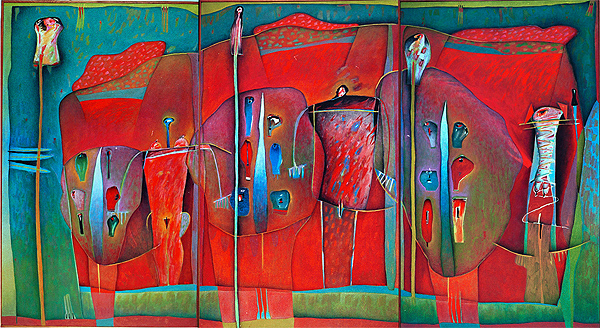
Maria Tomaselli: Three weeks, acrylic on canvas, 1995. MARGS collection.

The conceptual and practical controversy between the avant-garde and the academics, which began in the 1920s and 1930s with the introduction of modernism and was exacerbated by the political, social and aesthetic transformations of the 1950s and 1970s, continued into the 1980s. The most interesting development was the change in the objectives of artistic practice, as changes in the relationship between the artist and the public, in the concept of the work and also in the market, fueled by an increasingly voracious and internationalizing capitalism, led to the search for a regional artistic identity.

The change in perspective led some artists to think that "gaucho art" had existed in the past, but had dissolved because of the internationalization of contemporary art and the globalization of culture in general. Others bet on regionalism, associating it with folklore and popular art, or distinguishing certain specific procedures and identifying them as peculiar to Rio Grande do Sul. In the field of criticism, it was a period of decline, with the notable exceptions of Carlos Scarinci, Angélica de Morais and Luiz Carlos Merten, while academic research was gaining strength and the search for further training beyond graduation became more frequent among artists.

The easing of the military regime and the dynamism of the national economy also favored activity in the field of art. In 1984, the exhibition Como Vai Você, Geração 80? took place in Rio de Janeiro, where painting re-emerged in a celebratory spirit from an unstable and painful period, influenced by European and American schools such as the pioneers of action painting, neo-expressionism and fauvism, heralding the postmodern movement, dominated by reinterpretation and revival of historical styles. In 1985, the São Paulo Biennial organized the Grande Tela, a show in which painting was dominant. Two years later, Iberê Camargo became the center of a group of artists featured in the Viva a Pintura show at Rio's Petit Galerie.

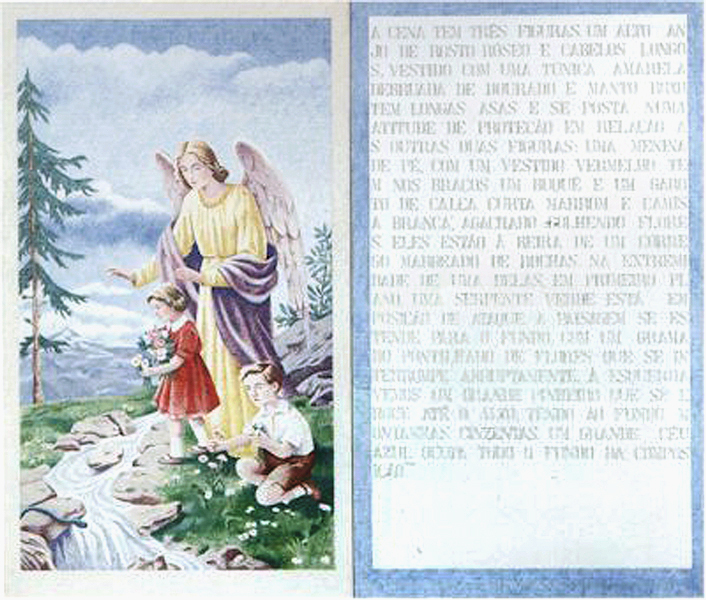
Alfredo Nicolaiewsky: Guardian Angel, acrylic on canvas, 1993.

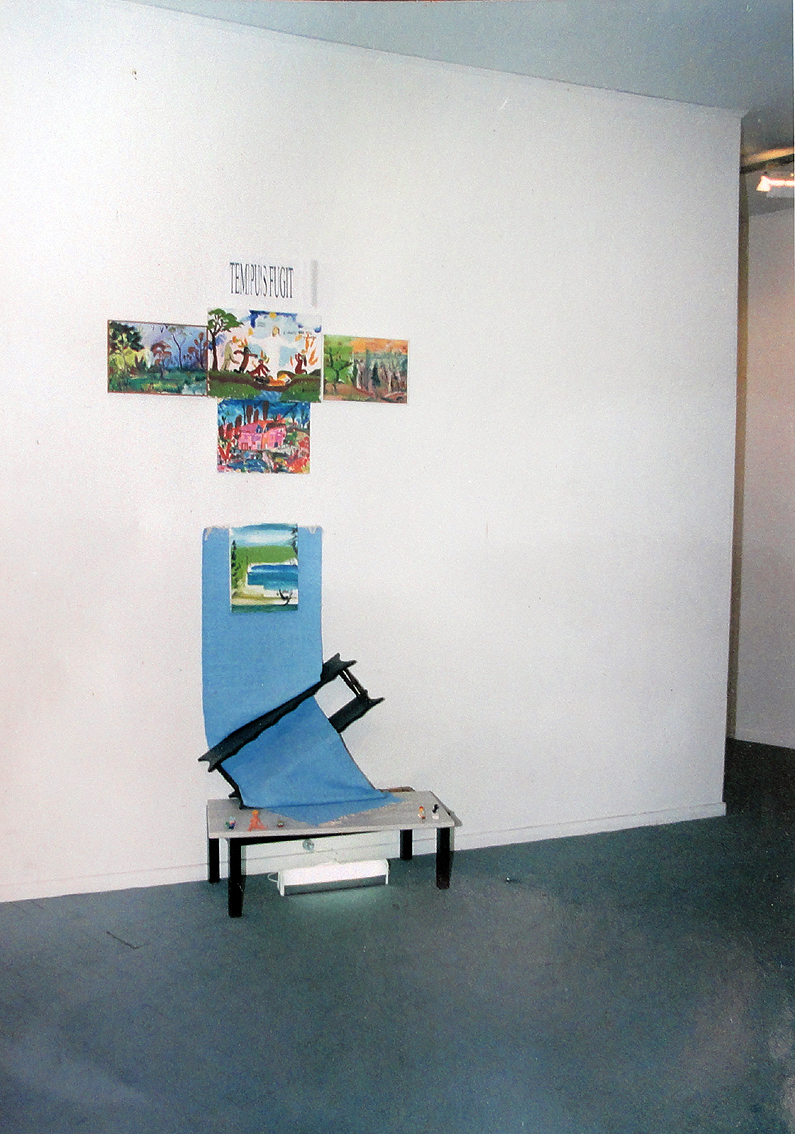
Tempus fugit, part of the installation Simplégades with paintings and other objects by Ricardo Frantz, in the group show Remetente, Espaço Cultural ULBRA, 1998, Porto Alegre.

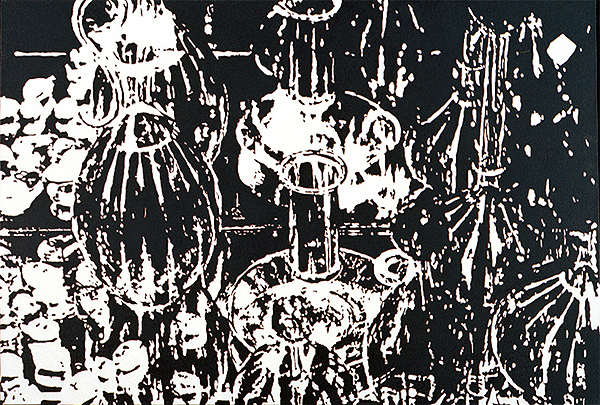
Mário Röhnelt: Untitled, 1991, acrylic on canvas, MARGS collection.

At that time, Mário Röhnelt, Milton Kurtz and Romanita Disconzi, linked to Nervo Óptico and Espaço N.O., and Alfredo Nicolaiewsky, elaborating elements of conceptual art towards a new pictorial visuality, exploring the relationship between painting and the graphic arts, photography and mass culture in a pop atmosphere, stood out. Maria Lídia Magliani began a successful career tackling the oppressed condition of women, Antônio Soriano, Clébio Guillon Sória and Antônio Gutierrez cultivated regionalist figurativism and Maria Tomaselli Cirne Lima used imagery inspired by Brazilian folklore and indigenous traditions. Galleries opened a few years earlier, such as Guignard (1970), Eucatexpo (1975), Delphus (1978) and Cambona (1978). The first art auctions took place, the Oficina de Arte Gallery was able to keep artists under contract and several art books and catalogs began to circulate.

Renato Heuser, Karin Lambrecht and Regina Ohlweiler followed the principles of informal abstraction; Gisela Waetge engaged with drawing; Petrucci and Ivan Pinheiro Machado focused on hyper-realism; Yeddo Titze pursued modernism; Heloísa Schneiders da Silva and Ruth Scneider revived expressionist figuration, and Fernando Baril and Britto Velho updated surrealism. They formed a large and dynamic generation of excellent painters and active teachers. In 1986, MARGS held an exhibition of contemporary painters from the Berlin School, which had a major impact on the new generation of painters from Rio Grande do Sul.

In the 1990s, popular artists solidified their careers and young artists made their debut in galleries such as Tina Presser and Arte&Fato, and in the João Fahrion Project, run by MARGS and the State Institute of Visual Arts (IEAVI). Many of them sought to form independent collective projects, showing their work in spaces that allowed them more autonomy and freedom and questioning the institutionalized system of art production, exhibition and consecration. The Plano B (1997) and Remetente (1998) exhibitions stand out as proposals for renovating collective actions, although not exclusively dedicated to painting. The generation includes Richard John, Marilice Corona, Chico Machado, Ubiratã Braga, Nelson Wilbert, Teresa Poester, Tatiana Pinto, Paula Mastroberti, Elton Manganelli, Alexandre Arioli, Eduardo Vieira da Cunha, Hô Monteiro, René Ruduit, Eduardo Haesbaert, Adriano Rojas, Eduardo Miotto, Gelson Radaelli, Antônio Augusto Frantz Soares, Cynthia Vasconcellos and Ricardo André Frantz.

The new generation was also characterized by its presence at major national salons, exhibiting assiduously in other states and abroad, by being aware of the latest developments on the international circuit, by having a strong sense of individualism and professionalism, consciously planning their careers, and by actively seeking better intellectual preparation by joining postgraduate courses and research groups. At the time, the Museum of Contemporary Art (MACRS) had an intensive program with exhibitions by national painters such as Dudi Maia Rosa, Carlos Vergara and Marcos Giannotti; the Chamber Salon and the Young Artist's Salon held their most popular editions; the Gasômetro Power Station Cultural Center and the Mario Quintana House of Culture became major cultural venues, and the Iberê Camargo Foundation was created. Rio Grande do Sul also hosted the Mercosur Biennial, which has been held in parallel with the Biennial B since 2007.

Currently, painting in Rio Grande do Sul is committed to multiplicity and freedom and works under the impact of globalization, with changes in the art system that remove the local scene as an effective leader and sponsor and suffers from competition from new media and a shrinking market. Retrospective exhibitions of local historical figures were organized by Caixa Econômica Federal (Caixa Resgatando a Memória, with shows by Trindade Leal, Petrucci, Boeira, Libindo, Pelichek, Koetz, Peres) and MARGS (Gheno, Escosteguy, Malagoli, Danúbio and Weingärtner). These retrospectives represented a significant advance in theoretical studies on the history of painting in Rio Grande do Sul, reaching a level of high professional qualification.

MARGS also held large national historical exhibitions with collections from the National Museum of Fine Arts and the Museum of Modern Art in Rio de Janeiro, and presented international exhibitions such as Florença - Tesouros do Renascimento with Italian paintings, and Arte na França 1860-1960: o Realismo, with French collections. Postgraduate courses in Visual Arts at the Institute of Arts and the Specialization Course in Plastic Arts at Pontifical Catholic University of Rio Grande do Sul (PUC) were consolidated. However, a general history of painting in Rio Grande do Sul was not collected and the available studies are all limited to some specific aspects or certain historical periods.

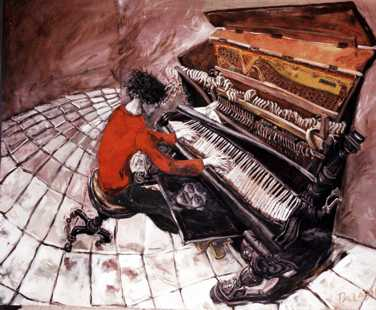
Paula Mastroberti: Daniel, acrylic on canvas, 1991.

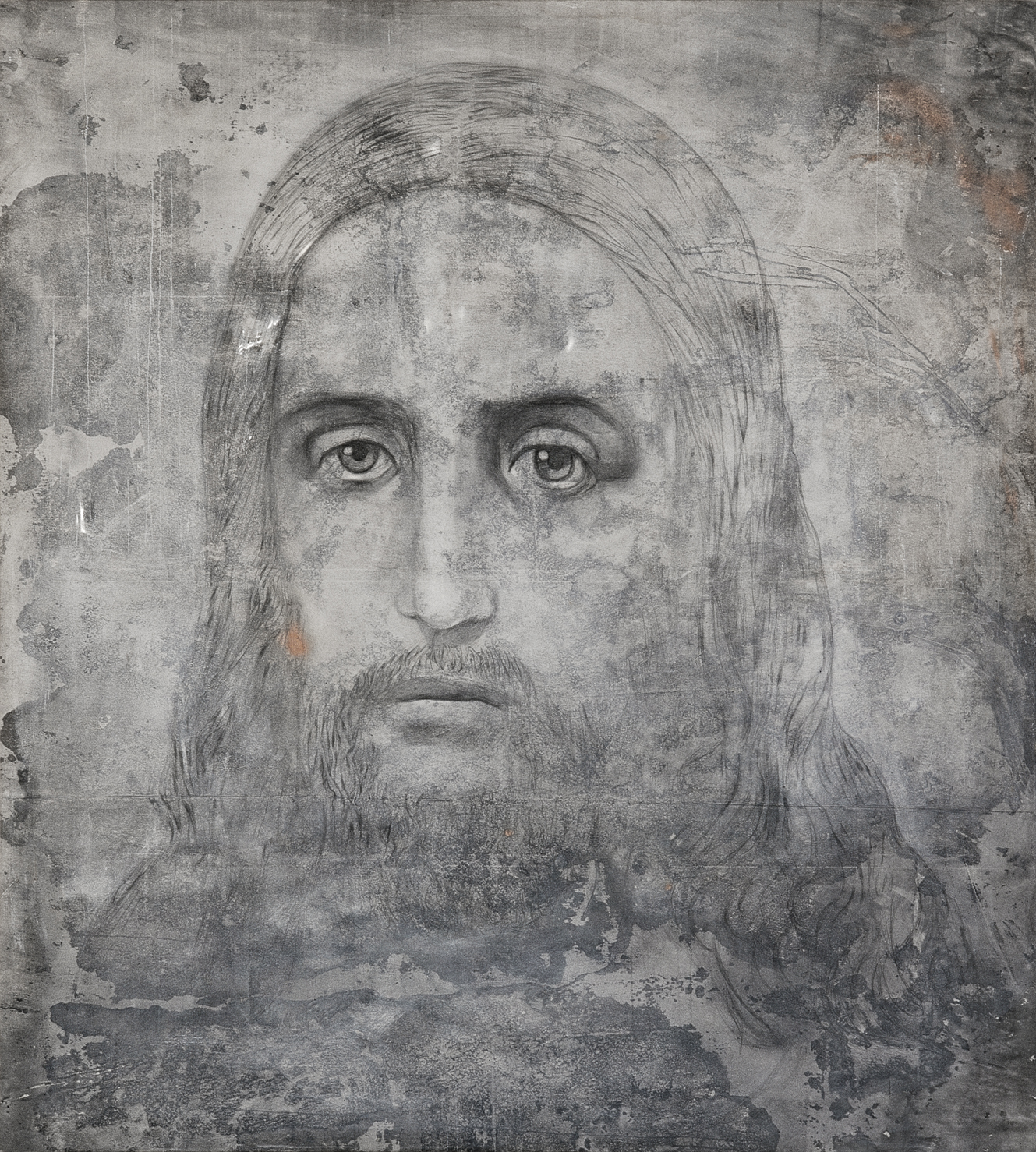
Richard John: untitled (Morphing Jesus series), graphite and acrylic on canvas, 1995.

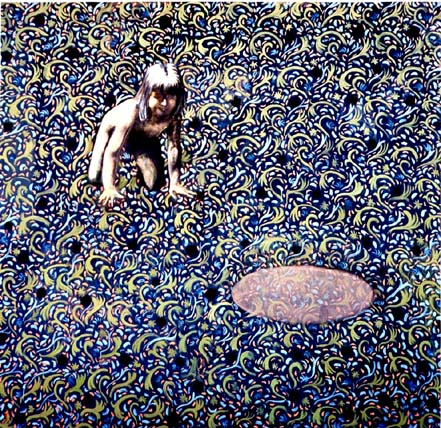
Marilice Corona: untitled, acrylic on canvas, 1996.

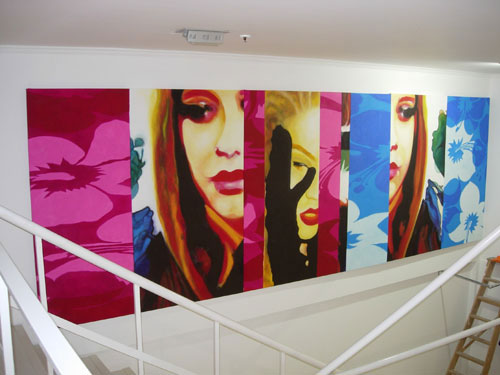
Eduardo Miotto: untitled, oil on canvas, 2007.
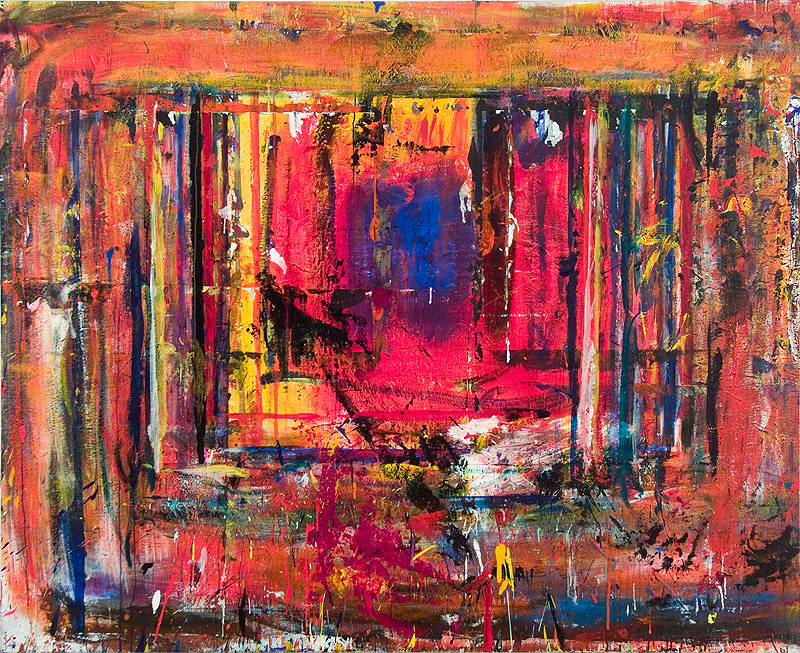
Antônio Augusto Frantz: untitled (Unrealized Paintings series), acrylic on canvas, 2004/2006.

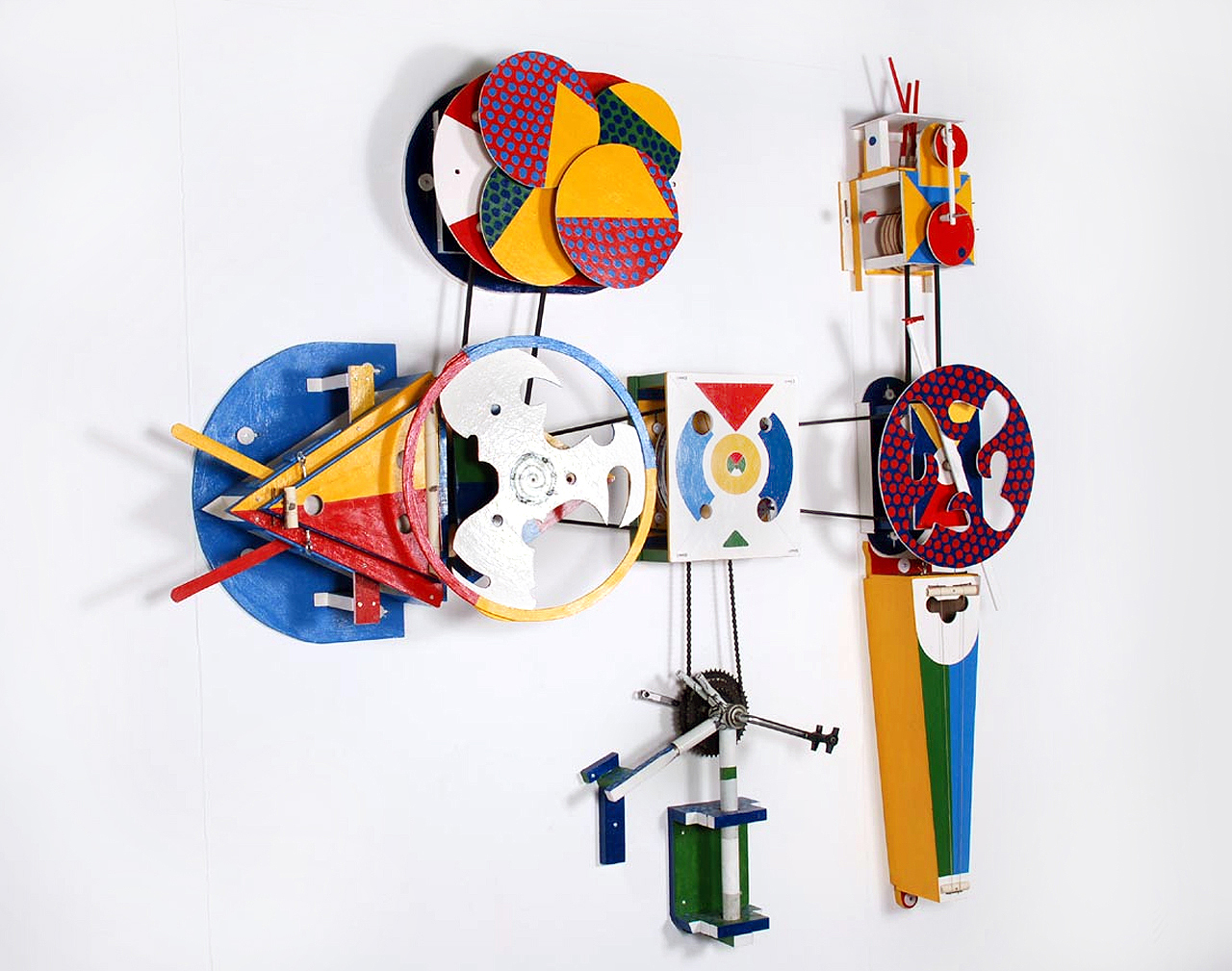
Chico Machado: deraierendelouer, painting on mobile, manipulable and sound support, various materials, 2007.

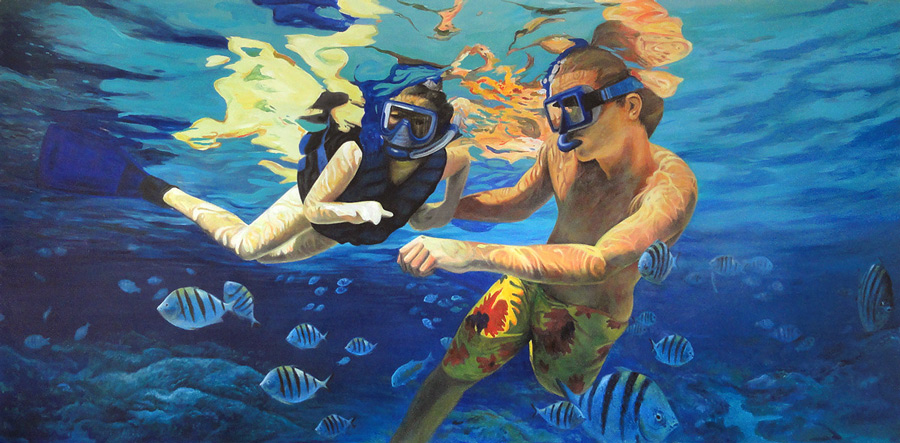
Ricardo Frantz: Initiation, acrylic on canvas, 2012.

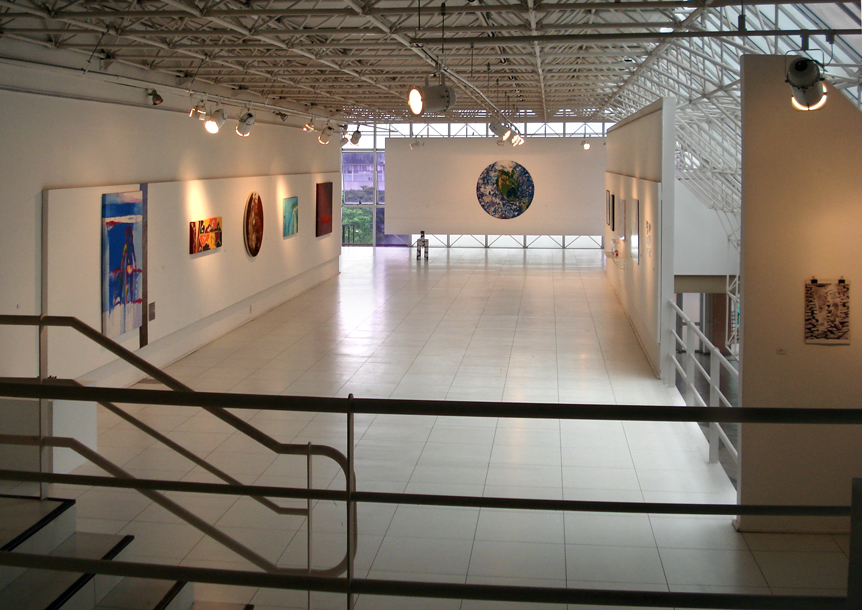
Xico Stockinger Gallery at the Mario Quintana House of Culture with an exhibition of paintings, 2008.

== News ==
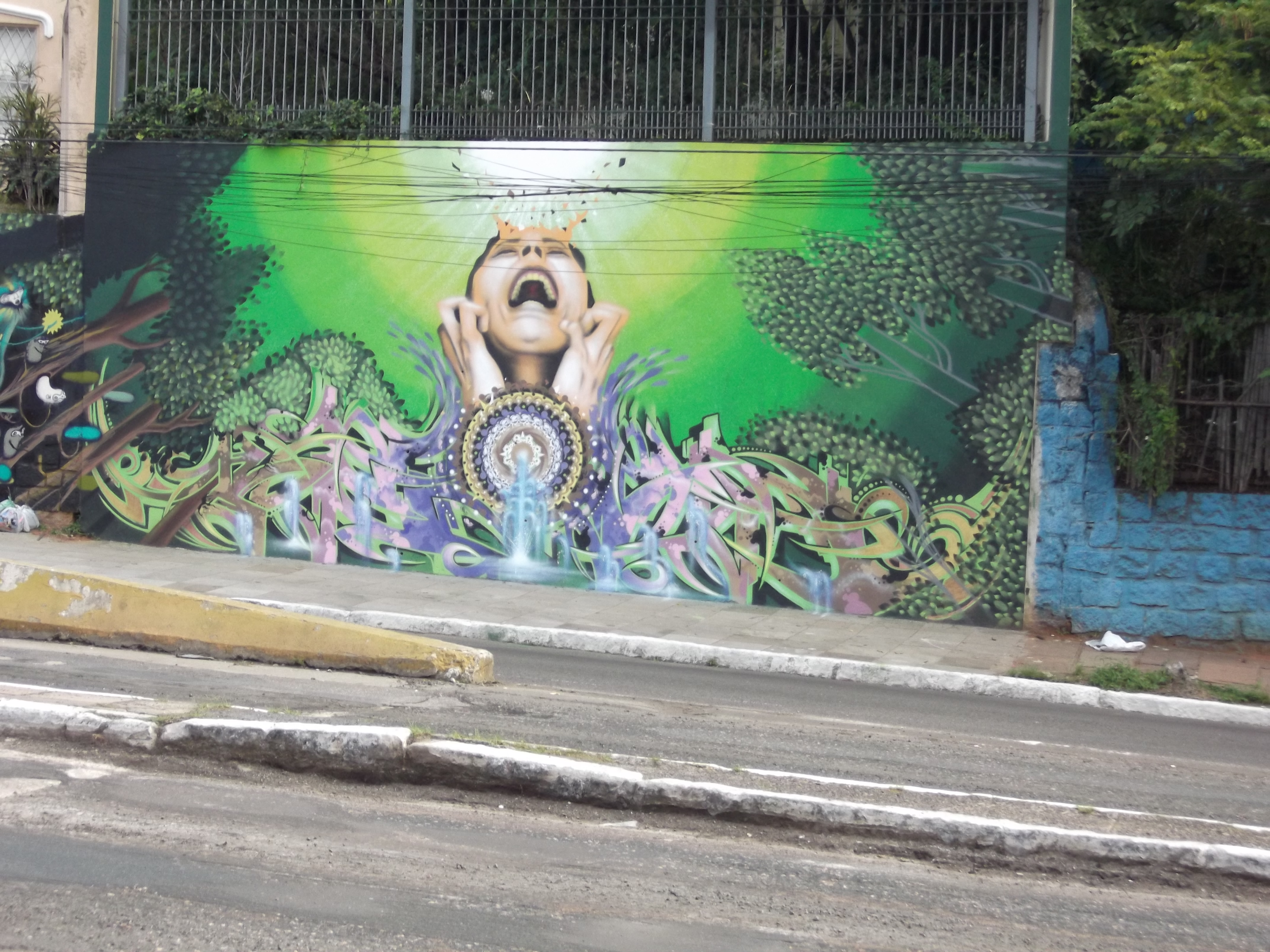
Graffiti in Porto Alegre.

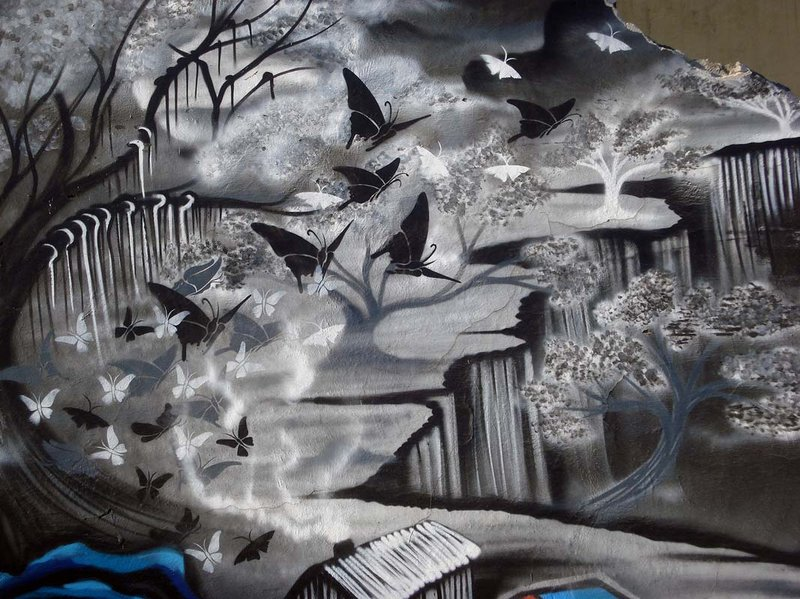
Graffiti in Porto Alegre, 2008.

Currently, painting in Rio Grande do Sul is developed in several cities, such as Santa Maria, which holds a Latin American Salon and has an important university; Pelotas, with UFPel Arts Institute, Leopoldo Gotuzzo Museum, Leisure and Tourism Foundation, Rogério Prestes and Lenir de Miranda; Montenegro, with FUNDARTE courses and the Montenegro Art Museum; Passo Fundo, with the work of Ruth Schneider and the Ruth Schneider Museum; Novo Hamburgo, with FEEVale's post-graduate course in Visual Poetics, and Caxias do Sul, with a large group gathered around NAVI. Painting exhibitions are often held in smaller towns, demonstrating the widespread popularization in Rio Grande do Sul.

Over the last years, graffiti has become a popular form of art, especially in Porto Alegre. Despite being an illegal practice, it has spread to other cities and influenced the cultured production of several artists from the younger generation. In central Brazil, graffiti developed an artistic quality recognized by a number of critics and attracted the attention of the curators of the São Paulo International Art Biennial in the 1980s.

In Rio Grande do Sul, graffiti has become an important method for strengthening social and cultural ties between young people, citizenship training, education about respect for diversity, and aesthetic, political and heritage awareness. It receives frequent media coverage and integrates projects developed by different institutions, such as the painting of Trensurb trains, Santander Cultural's Transfer exhibition and the installation of a Street Art Public Gallery at the Trensurb Bus Station. The exhibition Metropolitanos - A Nova Urbanidade em Exposição, held in 2012 by the MACRS, invited a large group of painters linked to street art. In 2013, the Pão dos Pobres Institute promoted the Aproximação festival, dedicated to urban art combined with talks, exhibitions and street activities.

== See also ==
- History of Rio Grande do Sul
- Brazilian painting
