= Rio Grande do Sul Museum of Art =

Art museum in Rio Grande do Sul, Brazil

Coordinates: 30.0291°S 51.2317°W

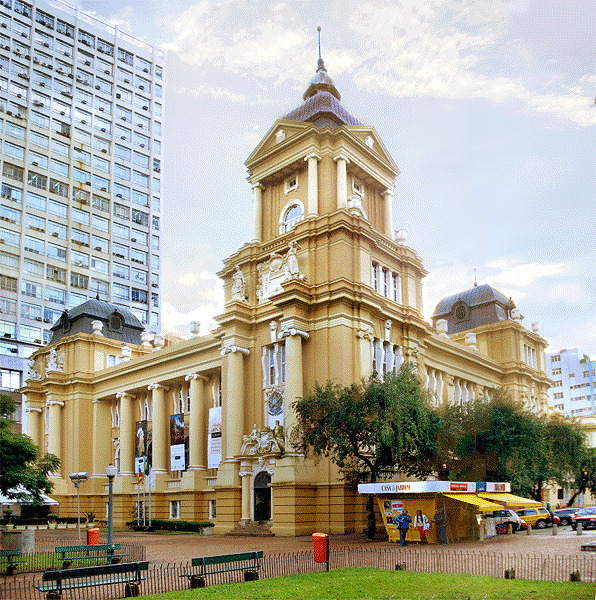
Main façade

The Rio Grande do Sul Museum of Art (in Portuguese: Museu de Arte do Rio Grande do Sul Ado Malagoli - MARGS) is an art museum in the State of Rio Grande do Sul. It is located in the centre of Porto Alegre. Its eclectic building, national heritage, is one of the most noteworthy historic buildings in Porto Alegre. Its design is usually attributed to Theodor Wiederspahn, a German-Brazilian architect, although important local historian and artist Fernando Corona ascribes it to Germano Gundlach.

== History ==
The museum was formally created by the state government through Decree 5065, in 1954, without any seat or collection. Soon afterwards the state Secretary of Culture, José Mariano de Freitas Beck, invited Ado Malagoli, a renowned painter born in São Paulo who had just arrived in Porto Alegre in order to teach at the Institute of Fine Arts, to lead the organization and establishment of the museum.

Malagoli started gathering some paintings dispersed among the state institutions and, provided with funds, purchased other pieces in São Paulo, mainly of stars of Brazilian painting as well as of some European authors, and in Rio Grande do Sul, from local contemporary artists. The museum finally opened to the public in 1955, installed in the foyer of São Pedro Theatre, showing those first acquisitions, some 120 pieces. In the 1960s the museum moved to an apartment on Salgado Filho Street, and in 1978 to its current building, which was adapted to receive staff and collection. At this time the collection had expanded to comprise over one thousand works, most of them donated, since the state funds ceased to be granted after Malagoli resigned in 1959.

In the 90's the building underwent major restoration and renewal of its equipment, becoming able to receive international exhibitions, like as tapestries from Musée d'Orsay, paintings from the Uffizi and Museu Nacional de Belas Artes, pieces of decorative art from the Petit Palais, and other important institutions.

== Collections ==
The museum currently houses a collection of over 2,600 objects of nearly all kinds of visual arts. The collection's core is formed by art from Rio Grande do Sul, being specially important the paintings and works on paper. Major local artists in the collection are Iberê Camargo, Pedro Weingärtner, Vasco Prado, José Lutzenberger, Carlos Petrucci, Luiz Maristany de Trias, João Fahrion, Ado Malagoli, Glênio Bianchetti, Carlos Scliar and Libindo Ferrás. There is also a little but interesting collection of Brazilian art, with pieces by Cândido Portinari, Emiliano di Cavalcanti, Lasar Segall, Arthur Timótheo da Costa, Antônio Parreiras and others, and some nice paintings from European masters of the end of the 19th century.

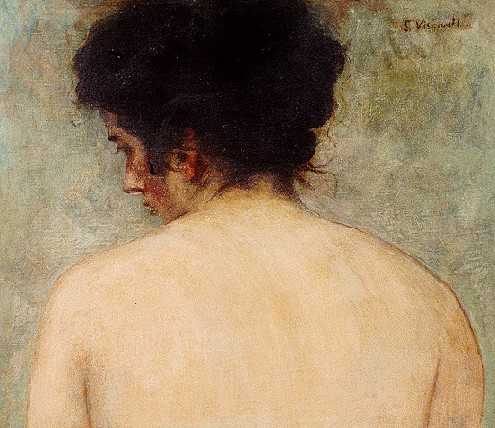
Eliseu Visconti: Dorso de mulher (1895)

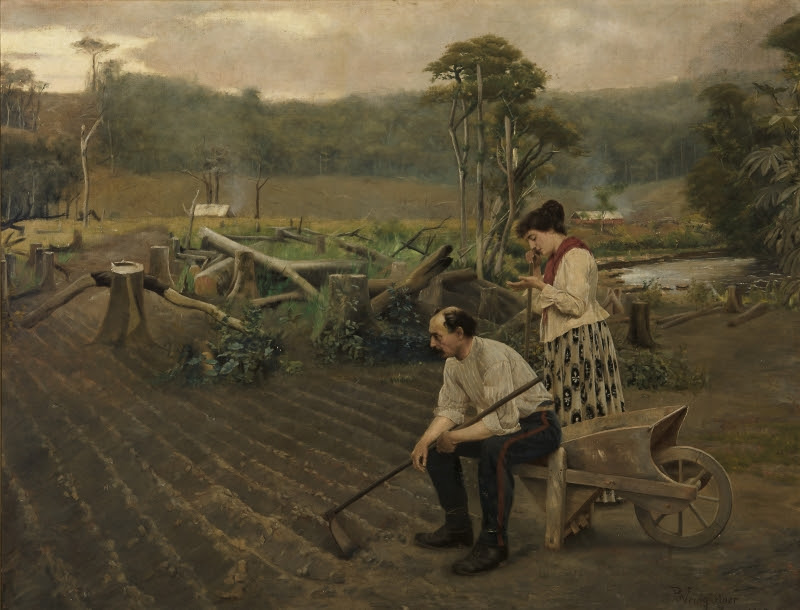
Pedro Weingärtner: Tempora mutantur (1898)

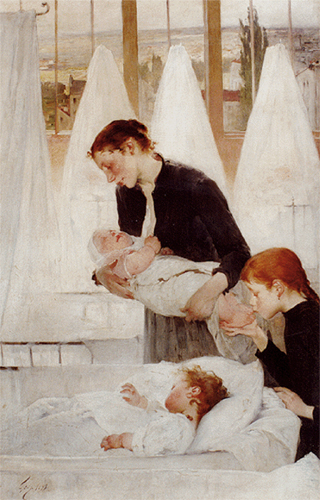
Henry-Jules-Jean Geoffroy: The nursery (1899)

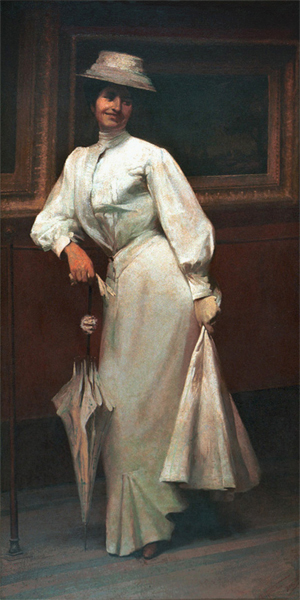
Arthur Timótheo da Costa: Lady in white (1906)

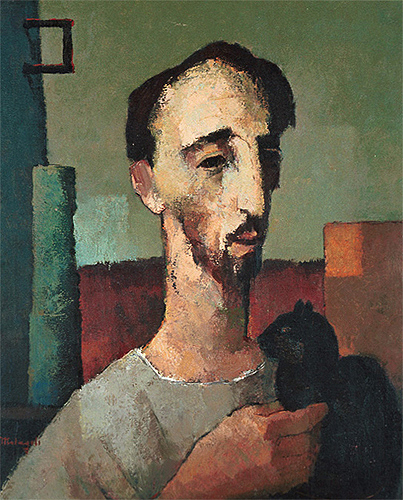
Ado Malagoli: The black cat (1954)

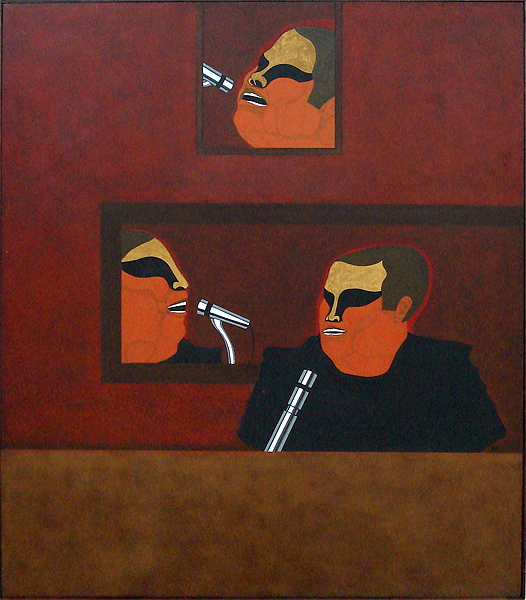
Britto Velho: Painting # 2 (1977)

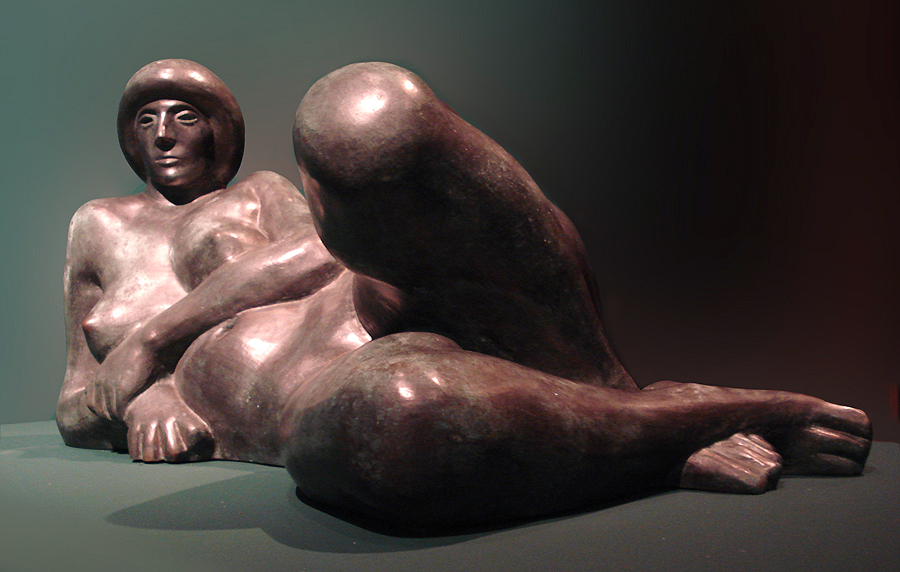
Vasco Prado: Model resting, bronze (1988)
