= José Lutzenberger =

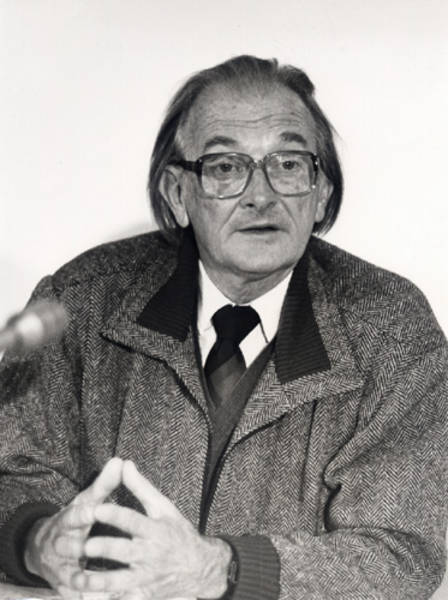
- Lutzenberger in 1988
- Born: José Antônio Kroeff Lutzenberger; 17 December 1926; Porto Alegre, Rio Grande do Sul, Brazil
- Died: 14 May 2002 (aged 75); Porto Alegre, Rio Grande do Sul, Brazil
- Occupations: Agronomist; environmentalist
- Father: Joseph Franz Seraph Lutzenberger
- Awards: Right Livelihood Award

José Antônio Kroeff Lutzenberger (17 December 1926 – 14 May 2002) was a Brazilian agronomist and environmentalist. In 1988, he was awarded the Right Livelihood Award for his "contribution to protecting the natural environment in Brazil and worldwide".

== Biography ==
He was born in a German-Brazilian family in Porto Alegre, the capital city of southernmost state of Rio Grande do Sul, as the only son of architect Joseph Franz Seraph Lutzenberger. He graduated in Agronomy at the Federal University of Rio Grande do Sul in 1950. For more than 15 years he worked in Germany, Venezuela and Morocco for a German chemical company, BASF.

In 1971, Lutzenberger founded the Associação Gaúcha de Proteção ao Ambiente Natural (Agapan), an environmentalist organization. He became famous for defending the environment together with Magda Renner, Hilda Wrasse Zimmermann, Giselda Castro and others during the time of military government in Brazil. He was appointed to the Environment Ministry in the Fernando Collor de Mello federal government, in the early 1990s.

"He was Brazil's first internationally known environmental activist, and the fact he was chosen environment minister in Brazil's first democratically elected government in 30 years was just one indication of the tremendous mark he made in that area," said Stephan Schwartzman, senior scientist at Environmental Defense.

In 1987 Lutzenberger founded a group called Gaia, which focused on global issues, and a year later he won the Right Livelihood Award in recognition of his work.

Like millions of others in southern Brazil, the Kroeff-Lutzenberger family was bilingual, speaking both Portuguese, the national and official language of the land, but also German, a strong regional language in the state of Rio Grande do Sul. Lutzenberg also achieved a high level of fluency in English, Spanish and French.

The Guarita State Park in Torres, Rio Grande do Sul, was renamed the José Lutzenberger State Park in his honor in January 2003.

== Death ==
Lutzenberger died in 2002 at the age of 75. He was buried as he wished – naked, without a coffin, close to a tree in a farm he restored, the Rincão Gaia in Pantano Grande, Rio Grande do Sul.

== See also ==
- Riograndenser Hunsrückisch
- Environment of Brazil
- Summers Memo
