= Summers memo =

1991 memo on trade liberalization

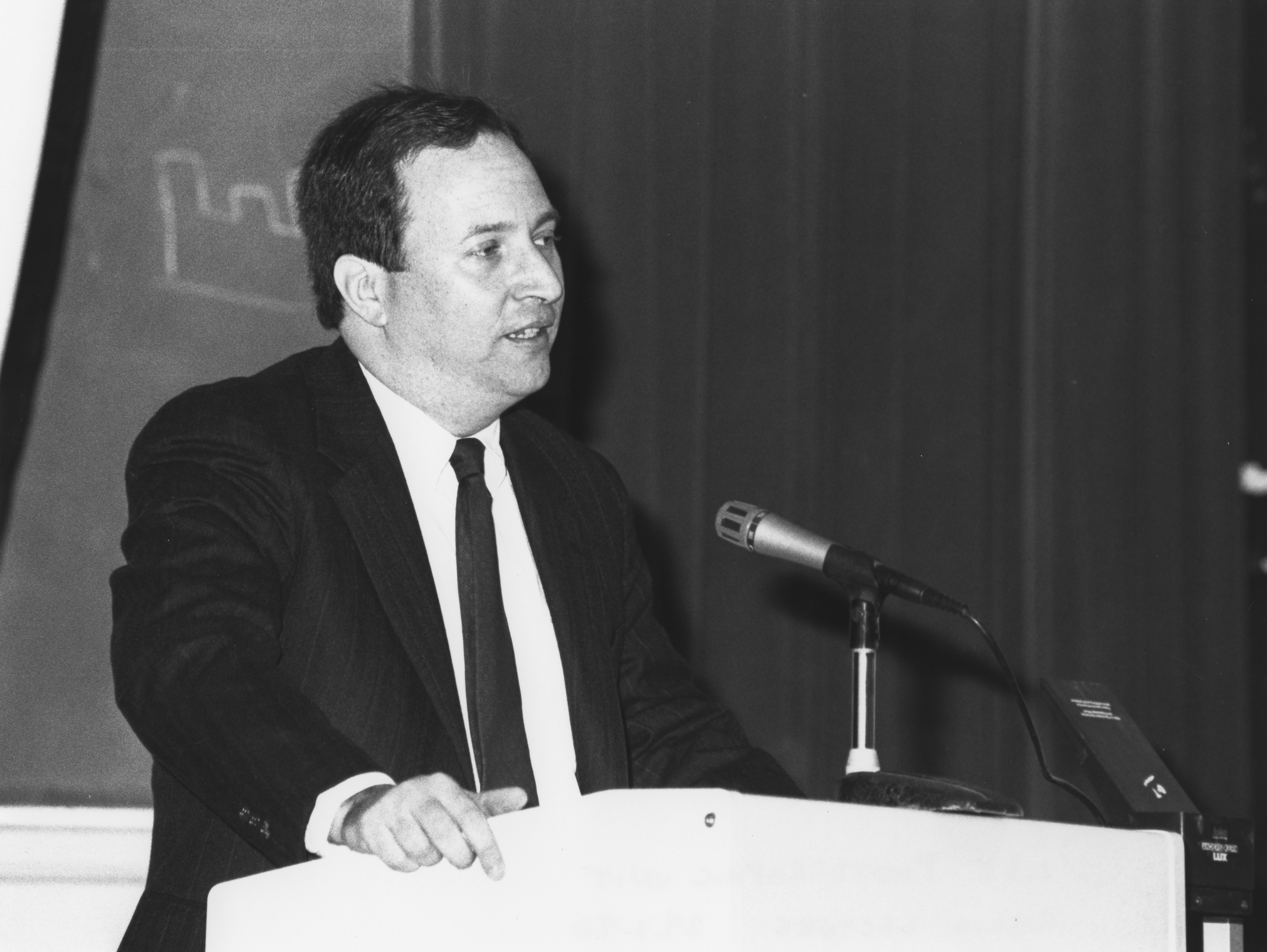
Larry Summers in 1990

The Summers memo was a 1991 memo on trade liberalization that was written by Lant Pritchett and signed by Lawrence Summers who was then Chief Economist of the World Bank. It included a section that both Summers and Pritchett say was sarcastic that suggested dumping toxic waste in third-world countries for perceived economic benefits.

After the material was leaked by Roberto Smeraldi of Friends of the Earth to Jornal do Brasil on February 2, 1992. Pritchett (who worked under Summers) stated that he had written the memo and Summers had only signed it, and that it was intended to be "sarcastic". According to Pritchett, the memo as leaked was doctored to remove context and intended irony, and was "a deliberate fraud and forgery to discredit Larry and the World Bank".

Daniel Hausman and Michael McPherson have argued that the satirical section might seem to be based in economics as a science, but in fact contains strong moral premises which cannot be removed and still leave the argument intact. Brazil's environment secretary Jose Lutzenberger argued that it demonstrated "the arrogant ignorance of many conventional 'economists' concerning the nature of the world we live in".

== Text of the excerpt ==
DATE: December 12, 1991
TO: Distribution
FR: Lawrence H. Summers
Subject: GEP

'Dirty' Industries: Just between you and me, shouldn't the World Bank be encouraging MORE migration of the dirty industries to the LDCs [Least Developed Countries]? I can think of three reasons:

1) The measurements of the costs of health impairing pollution depends on the foregone earnings from increased morbidity and mortality. From this point of view a given amount of health impairing pollution should be done in the country with the lowest cost, which will be the country with the lowest wages. I think the economic logic behind dumping a load of toxic waste in the lowest wage country is impeccable and we should face up to that.

2) The costs of pollution are likely to be non-linear as the initial increments of pollution probably have very low cost. I've always thought that under-populated countries in Africa are vastly UNDER-polluted, their air quality is probably vastly inefficiently low compared to Los Angeles or Mexico City. Only the lamentable facts that so much pollution is generated by non-tradable industries (transport, electrical generation) and that the unit transport costs of solid waste are so high prevent world welfare enhancing trade in air pollution and waste.

3) The demand for a clean environment for aesthetic and health reasons is likely to have very high income elasticity. The concern over an agent that causes a one in a million change in the odds of prostrate[sic] cancer is obviously going to be much higher in a country where people survive to get prostrate[sic] cancer than in a country where under 5 mortality is 200 per thousand. Also, much of the concern over industrial atmosphere discharge is about visibility impairing particulates. These discharges may have very little direct health impact. Clearly trade in goods that embody aesthetic pollution concerns could be welfare enhancing. While production is mobile the consumption of pretty air is a non-tradable.

The problem with the arguments against all of these proposals for more pollution in LDCs (intrinsic rights to certain goods, moral reasons, social concerns, lack of adequate markets, etc.) could be turned around and used more or less effectively against every Bank proposal for liberalization.

— Lawrence Summers,

== Coverage ==
Extensive news articles and discussion regarding this memo were included in the US Senate hearing records for Summers' nomination to Under Secretary of the Treasury for International Affairs in 1993. In this hearing, Summers stated:

The memo was drafted in my office at the World Bank as a comment on a research paper that was being prepared by part of my staff at the World Bank.

As drafted, the memo sought to clarify the strict economic logic by using some rather inflammatory language, not to make any kind of policy recommendation. And I obviously reviewed the memo inadequately before I signed it.

It made no attempt and was never intended in any way as a serious policy recommendation. No sane person favors dumping toxic waste near where anybody lives or thinks that places could be made better off with more toxic waste.
