= Maria Lídia Magliani =

Brazilian painter, designer, engraver, illustrator, costume designer and set designer

- Born: 1946; Pelotas
- Died: 2012 (aged 65–66); Rio de Janeiro
- Citizenship: Brazil
- Occupations: illustrator, painter

Maria Lídia dos Santos Magliani (Pelotas, 1946 – Rio de Janeiro, 2012) was a Brazilian painter, designer, engraver, illustrator, costume designer and set designer.

== Biography ==
Born into a family of artists, she decided to become a painter. In 1963, she entered the Fine Arts course and graduated from the UFRGS School of Arts in 1966. She was the first black woman to graduate from the institution. In the same year, she held her first solo exhibition at Galeria Espaço. She continued her studies with Ado Malagolii. In the 1970s she produced illustrations for newspapers in Porto Alegre. She left Rio Grande do Sul in 1980, settling first in São Paulo, later in Minas Gerais and, from 1997, in Rio de Janeiro.

Her work is characterized by themes influenced by the feminist movement and by using neo-expressionist aesthetics to reflect on the country's political situation and the condition of women and the female body in society. Even so, she made a point of not declaring herself a militant.

In 1966 she held her first solo exhibition in Porto Alegre and in 1967 she took part in the 3rd National Contemporary Art Salon in Campinas alongside artists Anna Maria Maiolino, Alice Brill, Amelia Toledo, Regina Vater and Teresinha Soares. Throughout her career, she has had more than 100 solo and group exhibitions, and her works are now in museums in Rio Grande do Sul, Santa Catarina, Rio de Janeiro and São Paulo.

Towards the end of her life, when she was already invisible to institutions, she suffered financial difficulties. She died in 2012, aged 66, from cardiac arrest.

Currently, the Estudio Dezenove gallery in Rio de Janeiro is responsible for documenting and organizing the collection of her work.

== Exhibitions ==
- 1966 1st Solo Exhibition, Galeria Espaço, Porto Alegre, Brasil
- 1967 3rd Salão Nacional de Arte Contemporânea de Campinas, São Paulo, Brasil
- 1977 Solo Exhibition, Institute of Brazilian Architects, Rio Grande do Sul Department
- 1979 Artistas Gaúchos, Embassy of Brazil in the United States, Washington, D.C., United States
- 1981 Desenho e Gravura no Rio Grande do Sul, Museu de Arte do Paraná (MAP), Curitiba, Brazil
- 1983 Maria Lídia Magliani, Center for Brazilian Studies, Assunção, Paraguay
- 1983 17th Bienal de São Paulo, São Paulo Biennial Foundation, São Paulo, Brasil (Curator: Walter Zanini)
- 1987 Retrospective Exhibition, Rio Grande do Sul Museum of Art, Porto Alegre, Brasil

== Awards ==
- 1993 Panorama of Brazilian Art, São Paulo, Brazil (Honorable Mention)
- 46th April Salon, Fortaleza, Ceará, Brazil (honored)

== Collections ==
- São Paulo Museum of Modern Art (MAM-SP), São Paulo, Brasil
- Pinacoteca do Estado de São Paulo, São Paulo, Brasil
- Rio Grande do Sul Museum of Art (MARGS), Porto Alegre, Brasil
- Pinacoteca Barão de Santo Ângelo, Porto Alegre, Brasil
- Galeria Espaço Cultural Duque, Porto Alegre, Brazil
- Rio Museum of Art (MAR), Rio de Janeiro, Brasil
- Santa Catarina Art Museum (MASC), Florianópolis, Brasil
- Museu Afro Brasil, São Paulo, Brasil
- Vera Chaves Barcellos Foundation, Porto Alegre, Brasil
- Museum of Contemporary Art of Rio Grande do Sul (MACRS), Porto Alegre, Brasil
