= Magda Renner =

Brazilian environmentalist

- Born: Magda Elisabeth Nygaard Renner; 31 December 1926; Porto Alegre
- Died: 11 October 2016 (aged 89)
- Occupations: Environmental activist, ecologist, writer, teacher

Magda Elisabeth Nygaard Renner (known as Magda Renner) (Porto Alegre, Rio Grande do Sul; 1926 – 11 October 2016) was a Brazilian environmentalist, activist, and ecologist.

Magda Renner began her work in environmental conservation with the co-founding of the "Ação Democrática Feminina Gaúcha" (ADFG) in 1964, with fellow environmentalist Giselda Castro. The organization later became the "Núcleo Amigos da Terra Brasil" (NAT/Brasil), and joined Friends of the Earth International in 1983.

Considered a charismatic and articulate figure, Renner became one of the most influential environmentalists in the state of Rio Grande del Sul. Her trajectory and that of Giselda Castro, were narrated in the documentary Substantivo Feminino, by journalist Daniela Sallet, with testimonies from Brazilian activists and foreigners.

== Career ==
=== Founding NAT/Brasil ===
Magda Renner began her work in environmental conservation with the co-founding of the "Ação Democrática Feminina Gaúcha" (ADFG) in 1964, with fellow environmentalist Giselda Castro. After attending a conference titled "The four basic principles of ecology" by environmentalist José Lutzenberger at the Association of Agronomists in 1972, Renner was further inspired to engage in environmental causes.

Originally created as a movement "by women for women", the ADFG later became the "Núcleo Amigos da Terra Brasil" (NAT/Brasil), a civil society organization of public interest dedicated to the protection of the environment, sustainable development and social justice. NAT/Brasil joined Friends of the Earth International in 1983.

=== Important campaigns ===
Some of her most important areas of action included struggle for sustainable societies, as well as the protection of Coastal areas, waters, climate and forests. Renner's campaigns focused on consumption and consequently garbage production and recycling at the local level. Her actions included the fight against the red tide that hit the Rio Grande do Sul coastline in the 1970s caused by the sinking of a boat carrying toxic chemicals on the coast of Uruguay; after the controversy surrounding this event, the name of the ADFG was always associated with the fight against pesticides. Renner was one of the founders of an international network against the abuse of pesticides, the Pesticide Action Network (PAN), and acted as its representative before the Agriculture Commission of the United States Congress in 1985.

Renner also campaigned against the burial of waste from Porto Alegre in the islands of the Guaíba River. Her work there and the increased recognition of her name, together with the campaigning by other environmental groups, led to the creation of the Banhados do Delta Biological Reserve. Renner learned to promote her messages through megaphone, leaflets on the streets, and in newspapers outside the social columns, with the support of her family.

In 1974, Renner's work earned her the Personality in Ecology Award by the Brazilian newspaper Zero Hora. In the 1980s, she held Protests on the problems arising from the installation of the Triunfo Petrochemical Complex, which ended up helping the group of companies to become a model of environmental responsibility. Renner's involvement with the international environmental movement began with an invitation to the United States by the US Embassy in Rio Grande do Sul, where she first met Friends of the Earth, and after which the ADFG was invited to become part of Friends of the Earth International. It was after the integration that the ADFG allowed men to join.

Renner's environmental lobbying was decisive during the drafting of the 1988 Constitution. She was invited to join the National Environment Council as soon as it was founded, but declined; Renner was invited again when José Lutzenberger was the Environment Minister, and she accepted. During this time, Magda Renner participated as the Brazilian representative in the NGO committee of the International Bank for Reconstruction and Development.

== Legacy ==
In 2012 the Legislative assembly of Rio Grande do Sul, on the initiative of Congresswoman Marisa Formolo, created the "Hilda Zimmermann, Giselda Castro and Magda Renner Ecology Pioneers Award" which highlights actions in defense of the environment. According to Formolo, 'the name of the award is a way of honoring women who have always had an ecological concern. We also want to pay tribute to these three magnificent warriors of ecology, who in very difficult times took on the defense of the environment'.

Considered a charismatic and articulate figure, Renner became one of the most influential environmentalists in the state. Her trajectory and that of Giselda Castro, were narrated in the documentary Substantivo Feminino, by journalist Daniela Sallet, with testimonies from Brazilian activists and foreigners.

== Family life and death ==
She was married to businessman Otto Renner, son of A. J. Renner, one of the greatest entrepreneurs in Rio Grande do Sul. With her husband she had children Telma, Felicitas, Cristiano and Mathias. She died in 2016 due to Alzheimer's disease, diagnosed 13 years earlier.
