= Romualdo Prati =

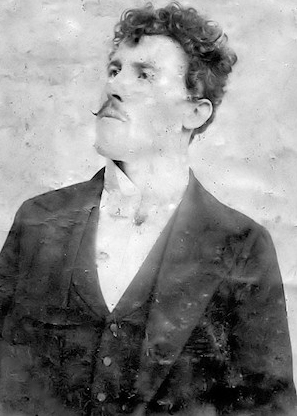
Romualdo Prati (c. 1900)

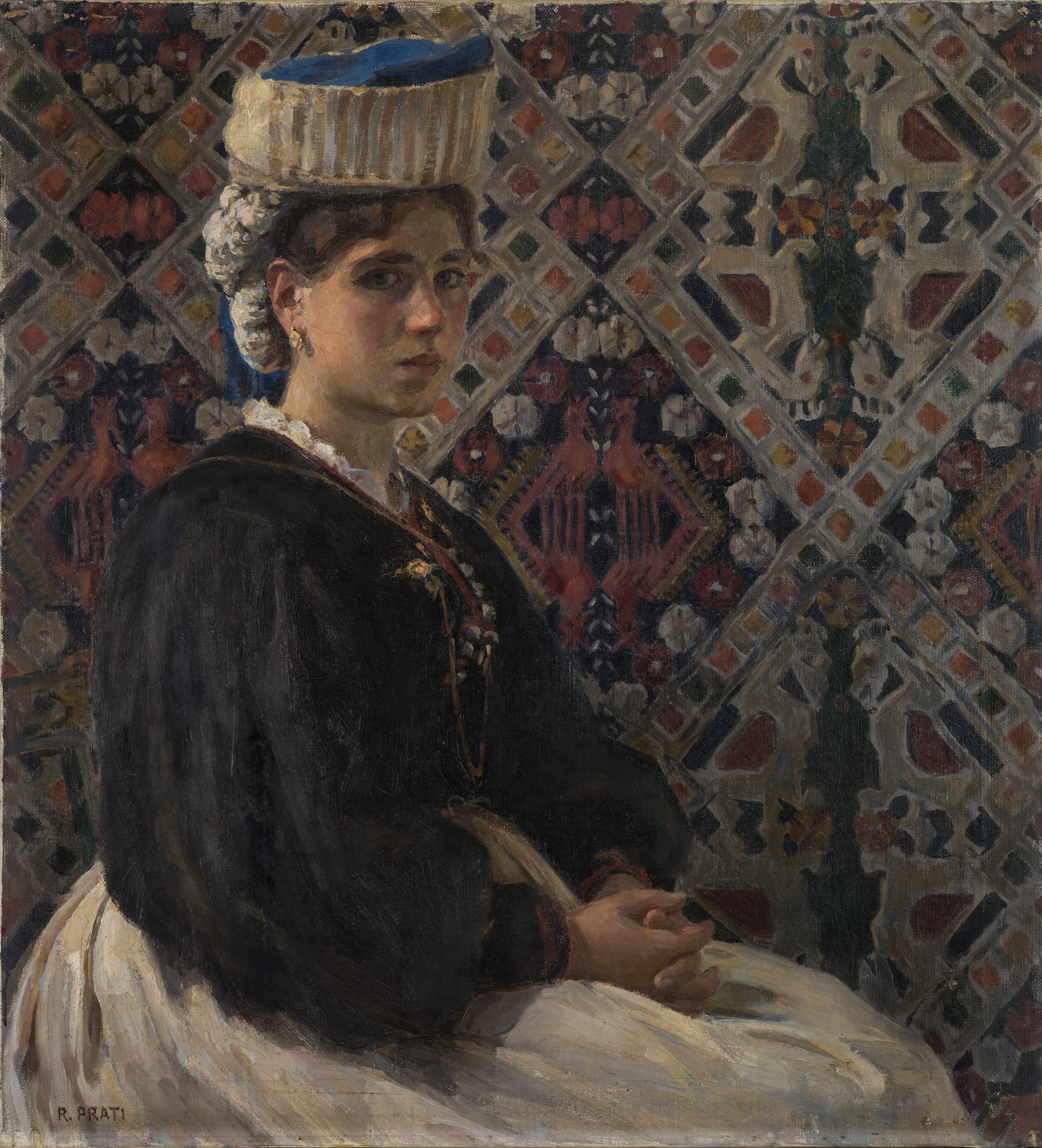
Portrait of a Woman in Traditional Costume

Romualdo Prati (3 February 1874, Salzburg – 16 March 1930, Rome) was an Austrian-Italian painter who spent ten years working in Brazil. He painted in several genres, but is best remembered for his portraits.

== Biography ==
His father, Stefano Probo Prati (1850-1928), was an employee of the Imperial Royal Austrian State Railways. When he was only a year old, his family moved back to their hometown of Caldonazzo, in Trentino. His artistic abilities were encouraged from an early age by his uncles, Eugenio and Giulio Cesare (1860-1940); both well-established artists. At the age of sixteen, he was enrolled at the Accademia di Belle Arti di Venezia, where he studied with Pompeo Molmenti.

In 1895, together with his parents and his uncles, Leone and Anacleto, he went to Brazil and settled in Porto Alegre. His family was quite successful (a street in Guaíba has been named after Anacleto) and he was able to take advantage of a growing interest in regional painting. Later, he took a few students. This was a major contribution, as there were no art schools in the region at that time.

Until the 1890s, painters in Porto Alegre presented their works in shop windows. Together with Pedro Weingärtner, Libindo Ferrás, Augusto Luis de Freitas and others, Prati helped establish the first art gallery there, in a special room at the Ao Preço Fixo bazaar. Around this time, he married Olga da Fontoura Carvalho, an amateur painter.

He returned to Europe in 1904 and settled in Paris, where he sought to improve his skills at the Académie des Beaux-Arts with Ferdinand Humbert. He also took private lessons from Eugène Carrière, who introduced him to the works of Henri Matisse and André Derain. Both had a major influence on his later style. After three years, he opened his own studio which he maintained until 1909, when he returned to Caldonazzo for two years, working as a portrait painter for the local elite.

Around 1915, he decided to make Italy his permanent home again. He initially settled in Florence, painting vedute and landscapes then, in 1919, moved to Rome, where he established a studio and a painting school for foreigners. His works from this period are mostly country scenes; primarily from Abruzzi.

By 1927, he was seriously ill and had to give up exhibiting. He moved to Villa Agnedo, to live with a cousin, hoping his health would improve there. He died three years later, while planning a return to Brazil.

Long forgotten, the Communal Council of Trento set up a website devoted to him and his works in 2007. A major retrospective was presented in Caldonazzo in 2011.
