= Libindo Ferrás =

Brazilian painter (1877–1951)

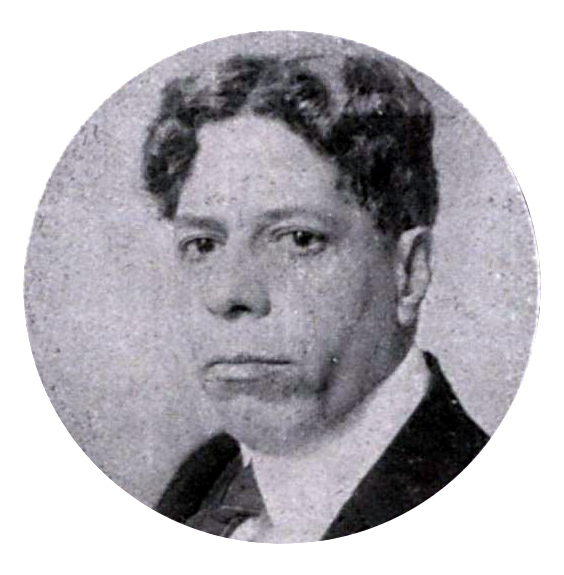
- Born: 1877 Porto Alegre, Rio Grande do Sul; Brazil
- Died: 1951 (aged 73–74) Rio de Janeiro, Rio de Janeiro; Brazil
- Occupation: Painter and professor

Libindo Ferrás (Porto Alegre, 1877 - Rio de Janeiro, 1951) was a Brazilian painter and teacher. He studied in Porto Alegre with Ricardo Albertazzi and in Italy from 1897 to 1899. He was one of the creators of the Institute of Fine Arts of Rio Grande do Sul, heading the school from its foundation in 1908 until 1936.

== Biography ==
=== Early life ===
Initially, Libindo did amateur painting, although he took lessons from Ricardo Albertazzi. In 1896, he began his career by exhibiting small canvases in a special room at the Ao Preço Fixo bazaar. In a column in the Correio do Povo, Olinto de Oliveira mentioned one of Libindo's paintings and, although he pointed out the amateurish nature of the work, he noticed exceptional talent and encouraged him. However, at this time Libindo was studying for his engineering degree. In 1897, he was in Rio de Janeiro, where he was supposed to continue his studies at the Polytechnic School, but he dropped out before the end of the year and left for Italy.

He stayed in Italy from 1897 to 1899, but not much is known about what he did. Eduardo Guimarães said that Libindo visited many cities, especially Rome, Turin, Milan and Naples, where he received lessons from several masters and visited the famous local museums and monuments. When he returned to Porto Alegre, instead of establishing a studio, he dedicated himself to a bohemian life, exploring different activities and exhibiting frequently in local painting salons. His work during this phase caught the attention of several critics. Pinto da Rocha, director of Gazeta do Comércio, spoke about Libindo in 1903:

Libindo Ferrás is one of the most complete painters we have ever met. He doesn't lack talent, he has a lot of feeling, he knows drawing, he knows how to see, he understands the medium well, but... he lacks constancy and persistence. Today he devotes himself affectionately to the sport of cycling, tomorrow he drops the handlebars and devotes himself to music, then he leaves the chromatic scale and picks up the brushes, then he drops the palette and loses himself in mathematics, gets bored of algebra and goes to shooting, abandons the pistols and clings to the foil, throws the weapons away and returns to painting! [...] He draws in all kinds of ways, he paints in all kinds of ways, he reads all kinds of books, he knows all kinds of instruments, he plays all kinds of weapons, he knows all kinds of games, from chess to backgammon, he's not an expert at anything and yet he could be a good, remarkable painter. [...] Libindo has no constancy, he floats around, and that's why he's not a successful artist, but a beautiful, remarkable amateur, full of talent, who would be done a great service if he was forced to paint, paint and paint".

=== Artistic production and acknowledgement ===
In 1908, Libindo participated in the founding of the Institute of Fine Arts of Rio Grande do Sul (ILBA) at an assembly called by state president Carlos Barbosa Gonçalves. In 1909, ILBA founded a Music Conservatory and in 1910, on Libindo's initiative, an Art School, where he was the organization's first director and teacher. The original project included the theoretical and practical teaching of Plastic Arts, including Drawing, Architecture, Sculpture, Applied Arts and Crafts. He remained in this position until the school was incorporated into the University of Porto Alegre in 1936. The foundation of the institute also included the creation of a network of schools and conservatories in the main cities of Rio Grande do Sul that would be administered by the Central Commission, on which Libindo was a member. However, the project faced several obstacles and required a long time to organize. Initially there were only the subjects of Drawing, Perspective and Anatomy. Painting was introduced in 1926, while Sculpture, History of Art and Architecture were only added after Libindo left the institution.

During this period, Libindo produced a large number of works mainly in oil technique and landscape themes, and established his reputation as one of the main artists from Rio Grande do Sul in the first half of the 20th century. Guimarães summarized his work as follows:

On his canvases, the places of nature in Rio Grande do Sul, the plants and woods, groves and trees, solitary ranches, enchanting foliage by the water's edge, admirable ravines, cornfields, horizons cut by mountains, the magnificent skies of Rio Grande - Libindo reproduced them not with the insensitive accuracy of photographers but with the truth of art, the right vision of color, the sure science of perspective, the conscious choice of aspects almost always touched by a soft, emotional and communicative poetry, which made his work that of a talented artist who first and foremost valued the virtue of being sincere.

Despite his inconsistent education, Libindo acquired the necessary skills to become an academic painter, with a vast knowledge of several theoretical and practical fields. He focused on landscapes, on canvases and watercolors in a poetic portrait of his land with an economical and traditional technique. He refused the romantic and neoclassical excesses and opted for realism. He did not paint any large canvases. Libindo was praised, participated in numerous exhibitions and received an honorable mention at the 1925 National Salon. However, the generation that succeeded him in Porto Alegre desired profound modifications, causing his style to seem outdated.

Even though he was not part of the artistic circles of Rio de Janeiro and São Paulo and after the attacks imposed by the modernists on the academics, recent critics recognized Libindo's valuable contribution to painting in Rio Grande do Sul, placing him among the leading artists of his generation and, for a time, the greatest painter permanently active in the state. According to historian Sérgio da Costa Franco, Libindo Ferrás "was a renowned academic painter who influenced several generations of art students". For Athos Damasceno, Libindo had a very promising and original start to his career, but after finding a personal style, his talent conformed to a formula that was somewhat averse to innovation, but which produced one of the most solid careers in Rio Grande do Sul landscaping. Paradoxically, even today his work is little studied.

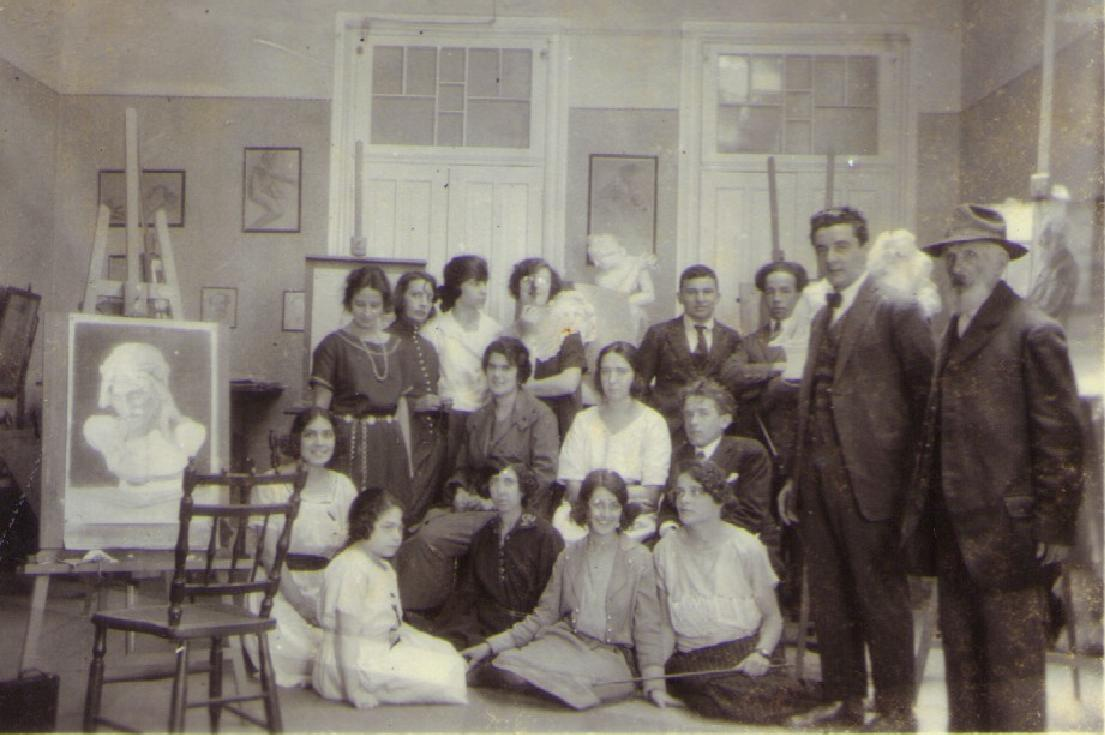
Students and teachers at the Institute of Arts in 1925. Libindo Ferrás is on the far right.

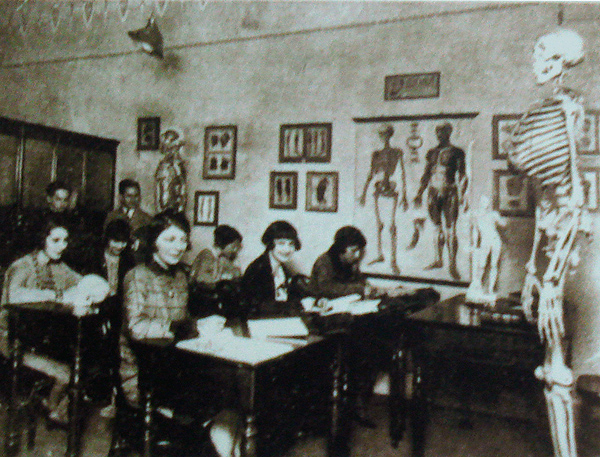
Anatomy class at the Institute directed by Libindo Ferrás, 1928.

As a naturalist, Libindo preferred outdoor painting, leading his students with him to create paintings in the semi-rural suburbs of Porto Alegre. His work for the arts in Rio Grande do Sul was essential in both the artistic and pedagogical spheres, as well as institutionally. He was the only artist among the 25 founding members of the Central Committee of the Institute of Fine Arts and one of the main people responsible for the existence of the School of Art in its early years, a period affected by a lack of funds, teachers and good facilities. Until 1913, Libindo was the school's only teacher. Between 1922 and 1936, when he retired, he relied on the permanent collaboration of Francis Pelichek, another teacher. However, renowned temporary employees worked at the school, such as Pedro Weingärtner, Helios Seelinger, Eugênio Latour, Oscar Boeira and Augusto Luis de Freitas. As a professor, Libindo launched the creation of a library and an art collection, which formed the origins of the Barão de Santo Ângelo Pinacoteca.

Libindo was an important element in the plans that the government was developing to renovate Rio Grande do Sul in accordance with positivism. At the time, culture became a symbol of excellence, a demonstration of the progress and success of the administration's plans. In Rio Grande do Sul, Libindo contributed to perpetuating an aesthetic trend aligned with academicism based on a conservative policy supported by the government and the elites who wanted progress, but in a disciplined way.

The founding of the Institute of Fine Arts was an important part of the process of renewing the arts of Rio Grande do Sul. Years later, the Institute became the main institutional reference for the production, study and discussion of art in the state, with Porto Alegre being the main hub of influence. For Angelo Guido, although his talent was dispersed when he was young, Libindo "fulfilled an important mission as a conductor in the process of developing an art production and teaching system" in his mature years. For Neiva Bohns, "compelled to take on administrative functions that were fundamental for structuring art education in the south of the country", Libindo was "one of the most important and persistent promoters of artistic production in Rio Grande do Sul". According to Círio Simon, a professor at the Institute:

In the institutional development of the arts in Porto Alegre, Olímpio Olinto Oliveira and Libindo were mutually supportive and complementary at several points. For almost three decades, Libindo dedicated himself to the task of building institutions to ensure that the visual arts had what local culture could offer them at the time. Libindo was a leader at the Art School, just as Olinto was at ILBA. [...] Libindo Ferrás' life, work and oeuvre are evidence of the possibilities and limits that the visual arts found institutionalized throughout the Old Republic in Porto Alegre. [...] He proved that his vocation and all his energies should be dedicated to the institution that was created at his behest. Within the regulations of the local institute, Libindo was responsible for the attempt to create an Arts Salon and to open it up to the outside world, in order to build a Visual Arts system.

After retiring, Libindo left for Rio de Janeiro, where he died. He has several works in the archives of MARGS, the Porto Alegre City Hall, the APLUB Pinacoteca and the Barão de Santo Ângelo Pinacoteca, as well as private collections.

== See also ==
- Brazilian academic art
- History of Rio Grande do Sul
- History of Porto Alegre
