= Vasco Prado =

Brazilian sculptor and engraver

- Born: April 16, 1914; Uruguaiana, Brazil
- Died: December 9, 1998 (aged 84); Porto Alegre, Brazil
- Known for: Sculpture, engravings

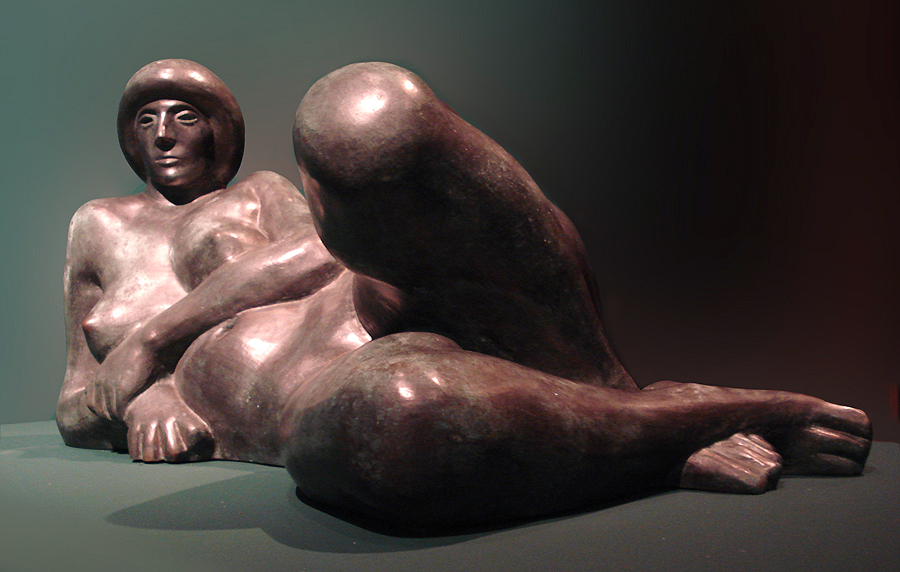
Modelo em Repouso (1988).

Vasco Prado (Uruguaiana, April 16, 1914 – Porto Alegre, December 9, 1998) was a Brazilian sculptor and engraver.
