= Joseph Franz Seraph Lutzenberger =

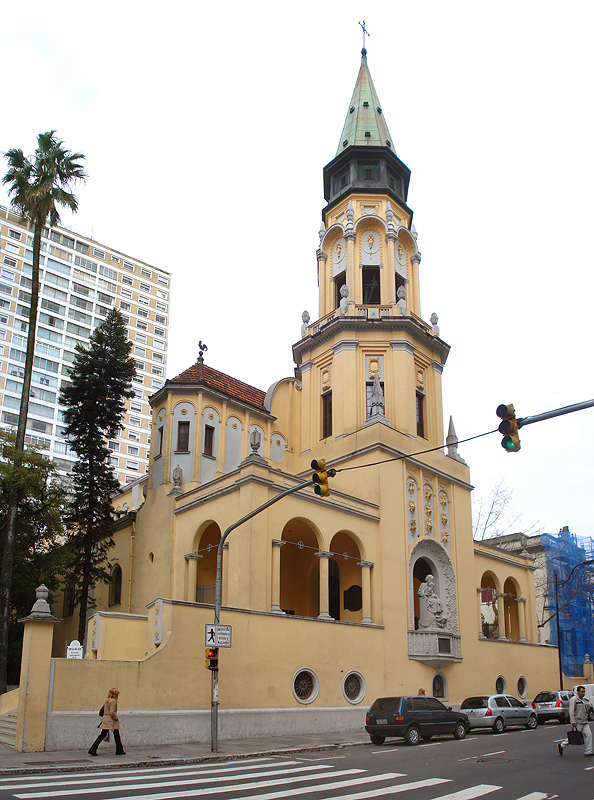
Igreja São José

Joseph Franz Seraph Lutzenberger (January 13, 1882 — August 2, 1951) was a German-Brazilian architect and artist.

== Biography ==
Born in Altötting, Bavaria, Lutzenberger studied engineering at the Technical University of Munich. Since an early age, he found pleasure in painting and drawing. He worked as an architect in Dresden (1909) and Wiesbaden (1912–1913), and was a pupil of Osvald Polívka (1910) in Prague and of Georg Süßenguth and Heinrich Reinhardt (1911) in Berlin.

When the First World War began in 1914, Lutzenberger served within the German armed forces as a weapon designer, having fought against the Allies in France and Belgium. During the war truces, he would paint and draw military scenes and landscapes.

When he arrived in Porto Alegre in 1920, Lutzenberger was hired by Weiss CIA, a construction company, and designed important buildings in the city, such as the Igreja São José, the Palácio do Comércio, and the Instituto Pão dos Pobres. As an architect, Lutzenberger had a sober and functional eclectic style. Besides Porto Alegre, he also executed other buildings in cities like Caxias do Sul, Novo Hamburgo, Lajeado and Santa Cruz do Sul.

In 1938, he started teaching in the Instituto de Belas Artes, which belongs to the Federal University of Rio Grande do Sul nowadays. There he was a professor of decorative arts and descriptive geometry.

As an artist, Lutzenberger liked to paint the city with its inhabitants, houses and traditions, the war, and the country life. A low-profile person, he displayed an exhibition of his works only once in life, during the Ragamuffin War centenary celebrations, in 1935.

He and his wife Emma Kroeff had three children. Their only son, José Lutzenberger, was a famous environmentalist in Brazil. The Kroeff-Lutzenberger home was bilingual German and Portuguese, like millions of others in southern Brazil.

== See also ==
The German language as a minority language in southern Brazil: Riograndenser Hunsrückisch.
