= João Fahrion =

Brazilian painter, engraver, draughtsman and illustrator

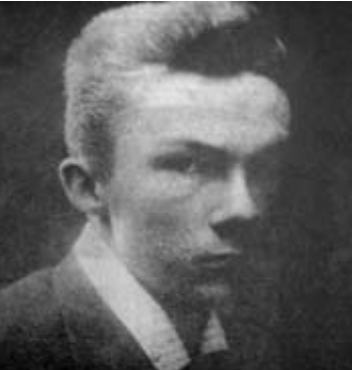
Photography of artist in the 1910s.

João Fahrion (October 4, 1898 - August 11, 1970) was a Brazilian painter, engraver, draughtsman and illustrator. He was born and died in Porto Alegre.
