= Brazilian art =

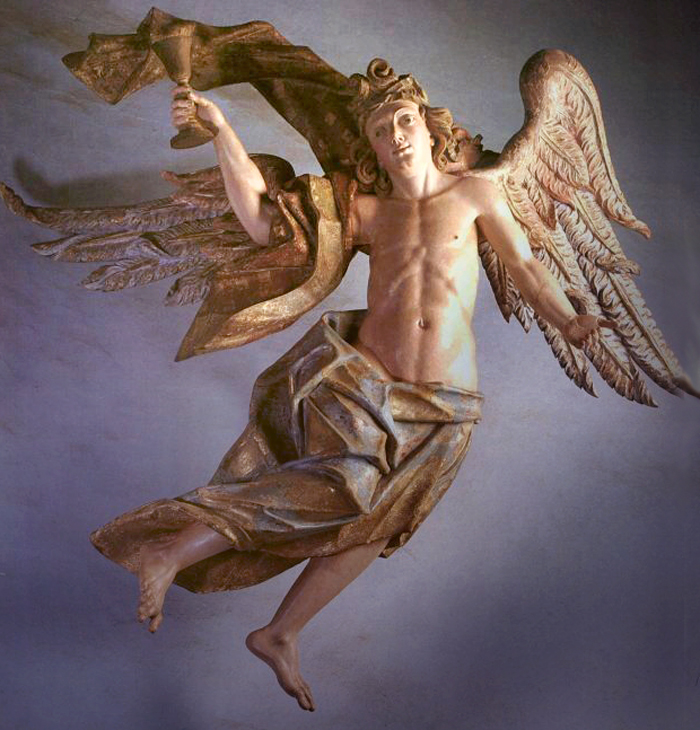
Aleijadinho: Angel of the Passion, c. 1799. Congonhas do Campo

The creation of art in the geographic area now known as Brazil begins with the earliest records of its human habitation. The original inhabitants of the land, pre-Cabraline Indigenous or Natives peoples, produced various forms of art; specific cultures like the Marajoara left sophisticated painted pottery. This area was colonized by Portugal in the 16th century and given the modern name of Brazil. Brazilian art is most commonly used as an umbrella term for art created in this region post Portuguese colonization.

== Pre-Cabraline traditions ==
The oldest known art in Brazil is the cave paintings in Serra da Capivara National Park in the state of Piauí, dating back to c. 13,000 BC. More recent examples have been found in Minas Gerais and Goiás, showing geometric patterns and animal forms.

One of the most sophisticated kinds of Pre-Cabraline artifact found in Brazil is the sophisticated Marajoara pottery (c. 800–1400 AD), from cultures flourishing on Marajó Island and around the region of Santarém, decorated with painting and complex human and animal reliefs. Statuettes and cult objects, such as the small carved-stone amulets called muiraquitãs, also belong to these cultures. The Mina and Periperi cultures, from Maranhão and Bahia, produced interesting though simpler pottery and statuettes.

In the beginning of the 21st century, the ancient Indian traditions of body painting, pottery, cult statuettes, and feather art are still being cultivated by the remaining Indian peoples.

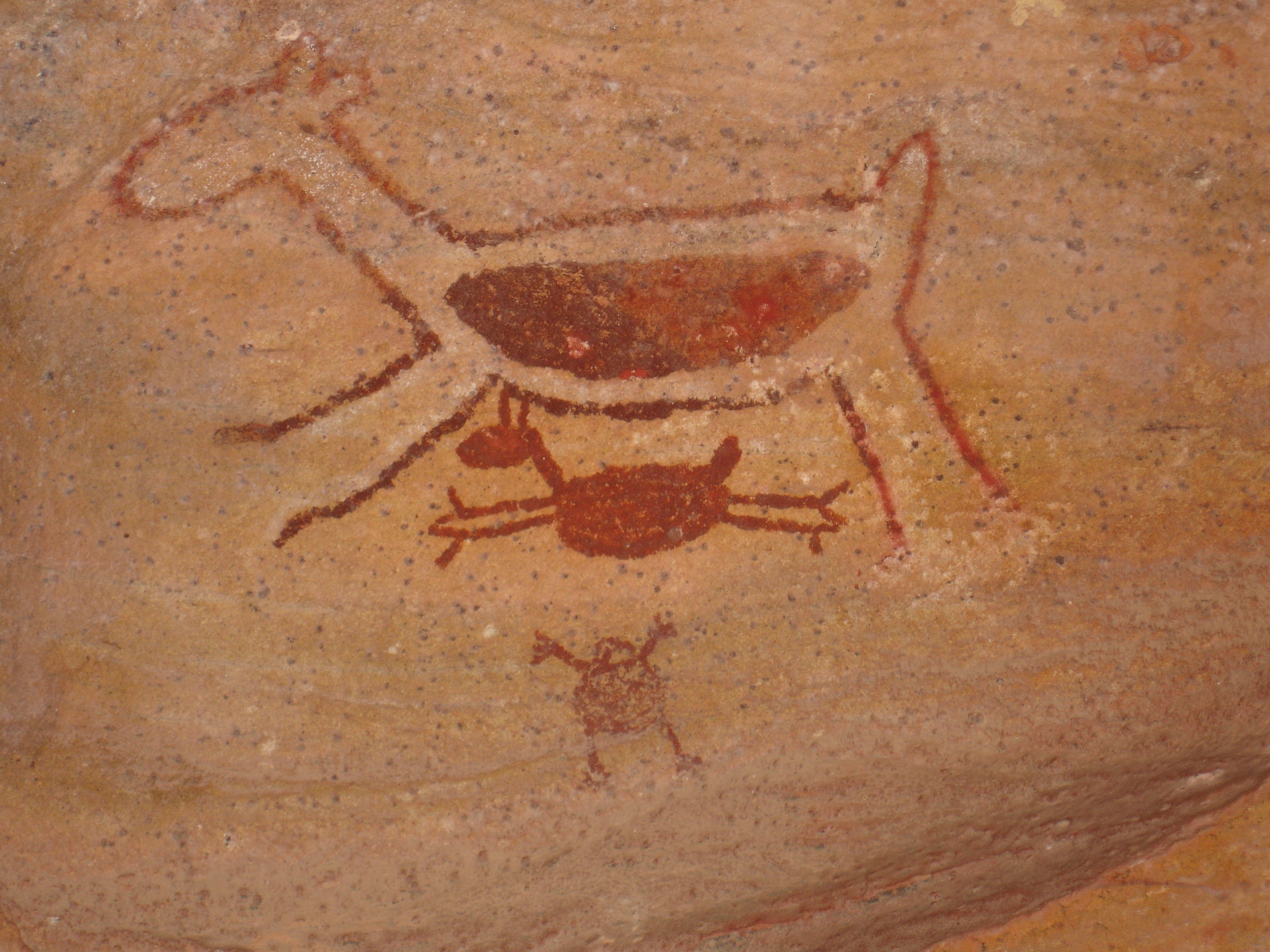
Cave paintings, Serra da Capivara National Park.

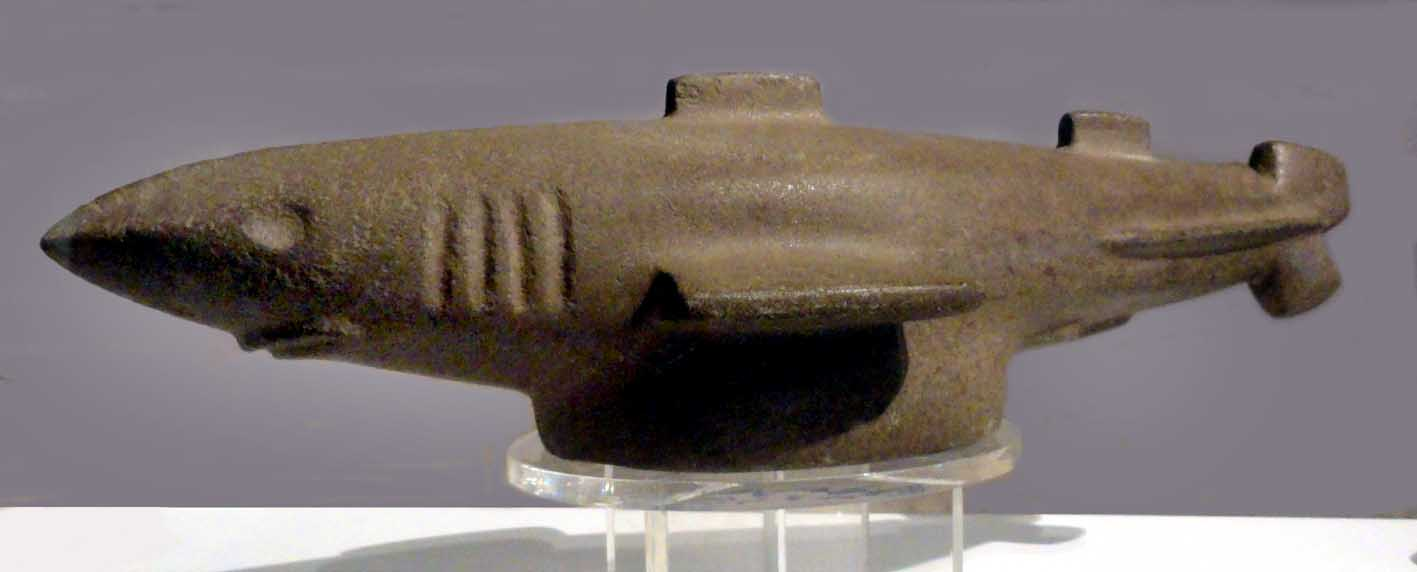
Shark-shaped carved stone, Sambaqui culture, Museu da Universidade Federal do Rio Grande do Sul.

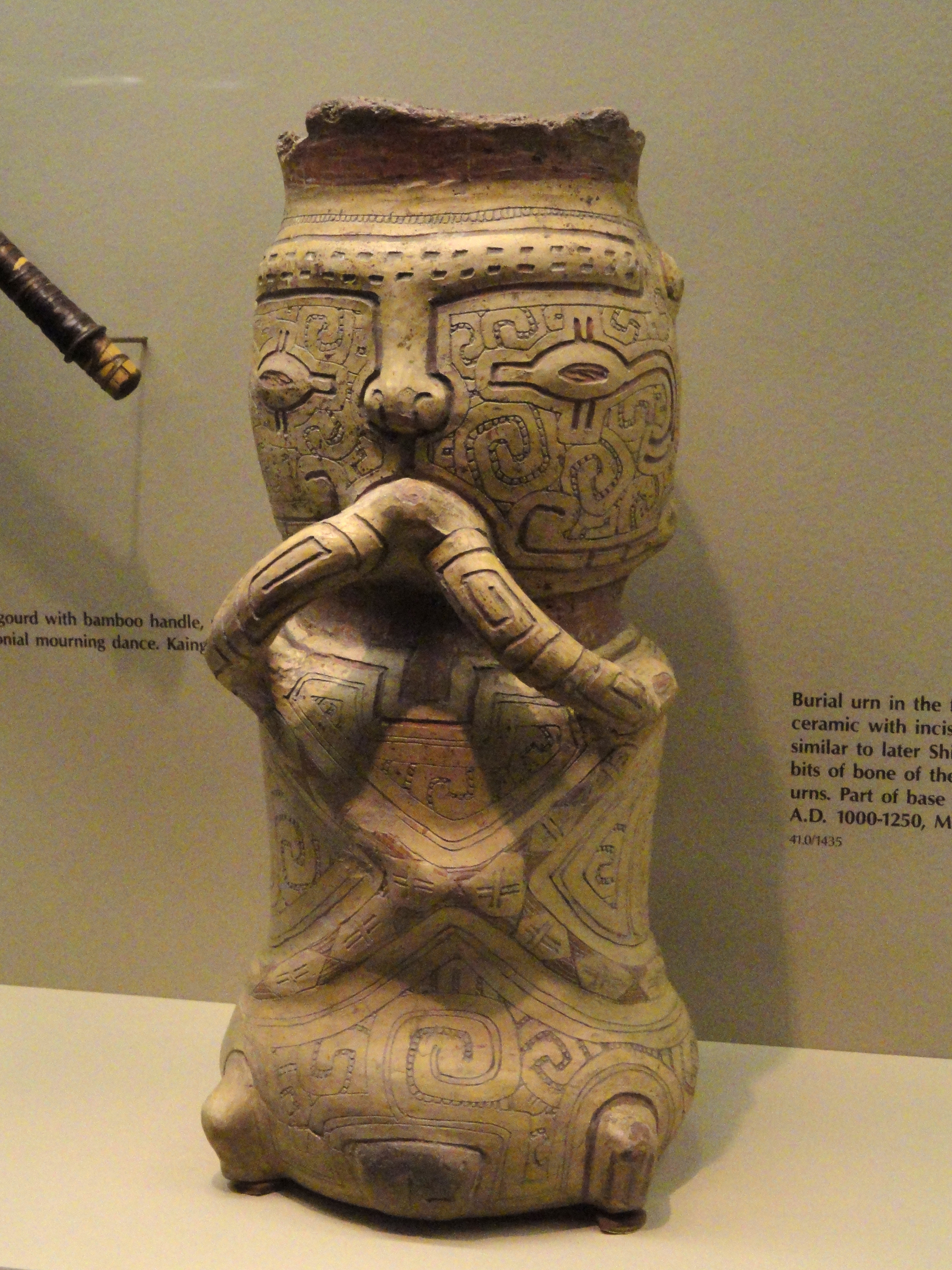
Burial urn, Marajoara culture. American Museum of Natural History.

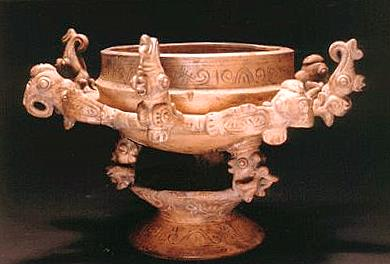
Santarém culture. Museu Paraense Emílio Goeldi.
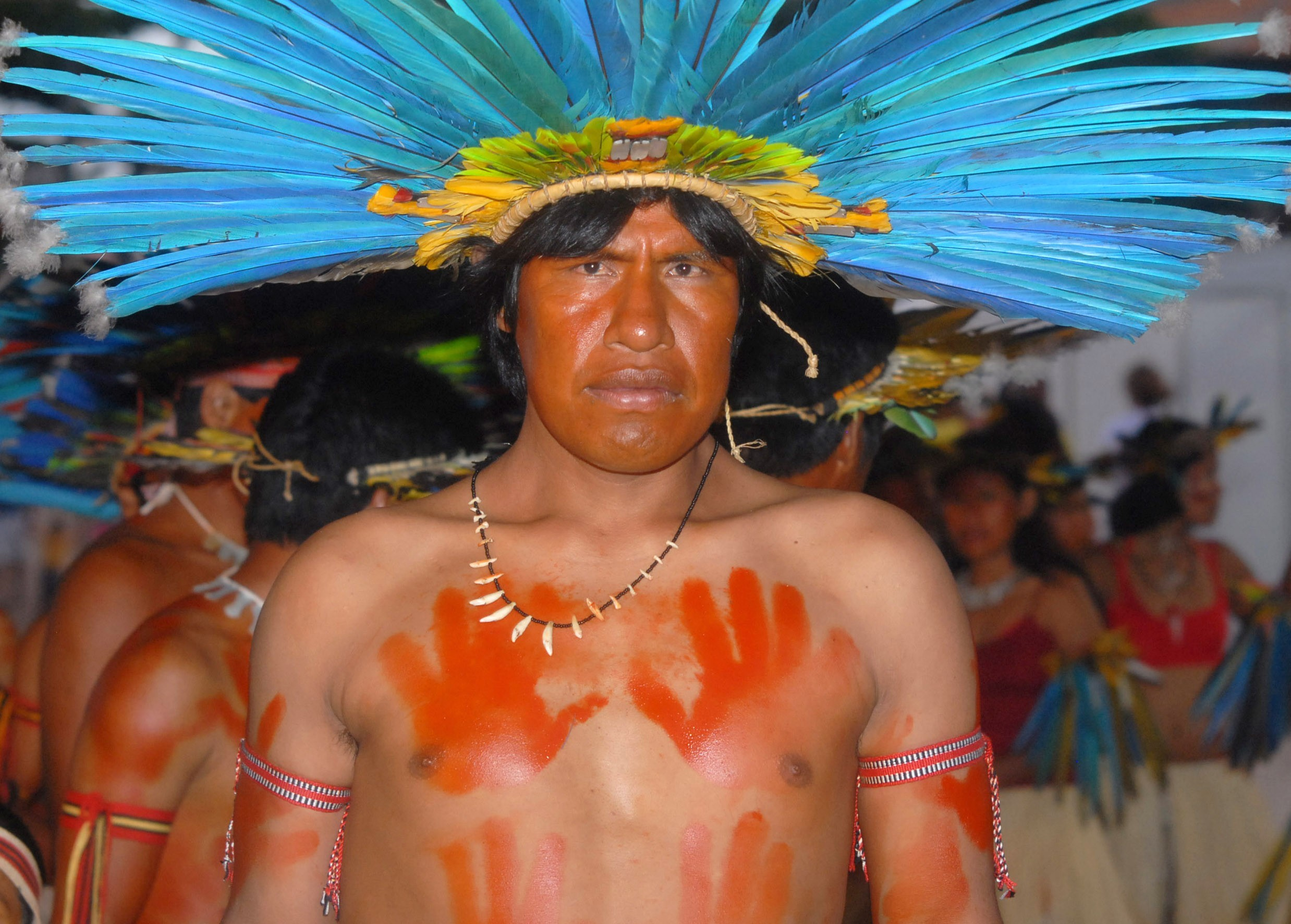
Bororo Indian with feather headdress and body painting.

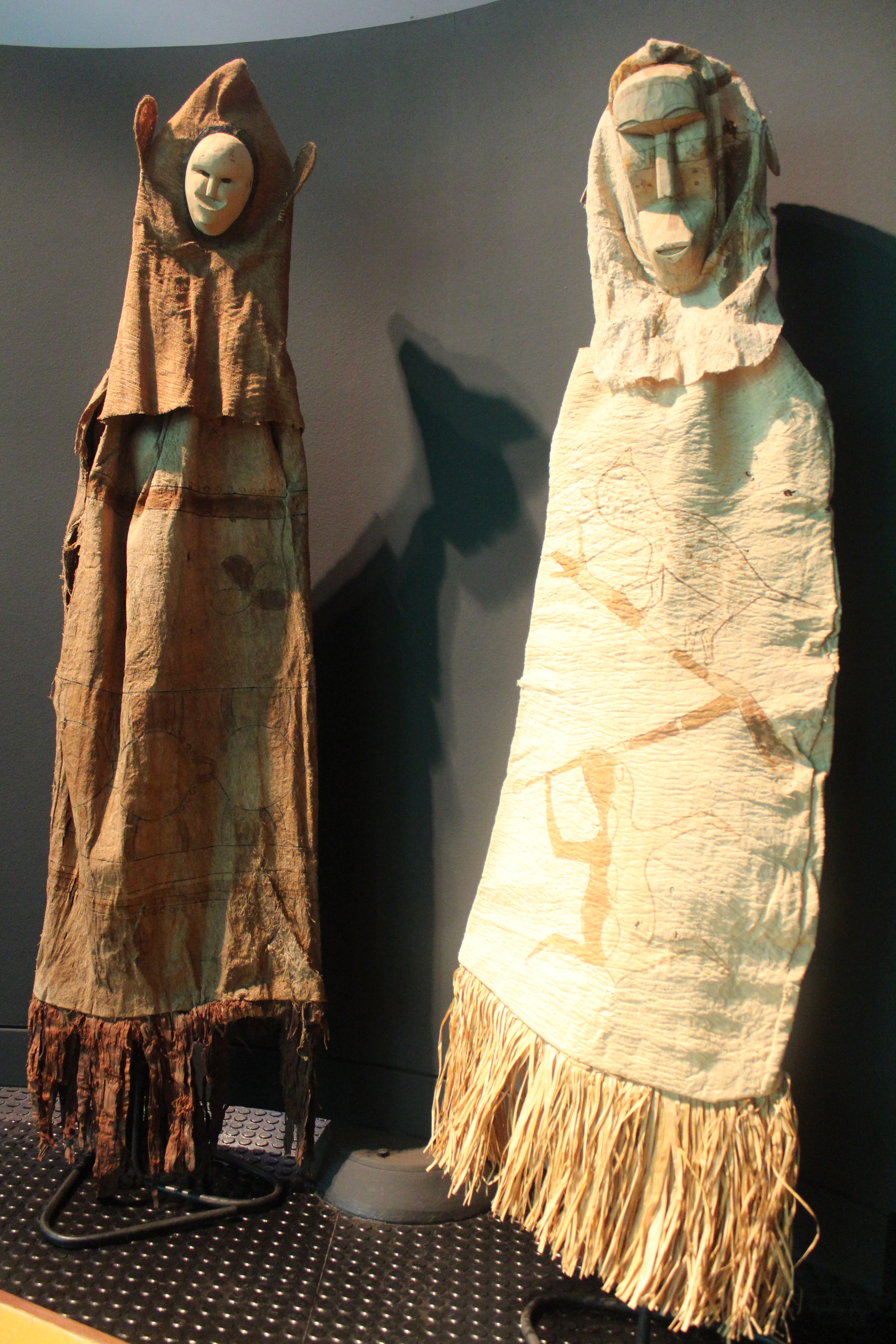
Ticuna ceremonial dresses. Memorial dos Povos Indígenas.

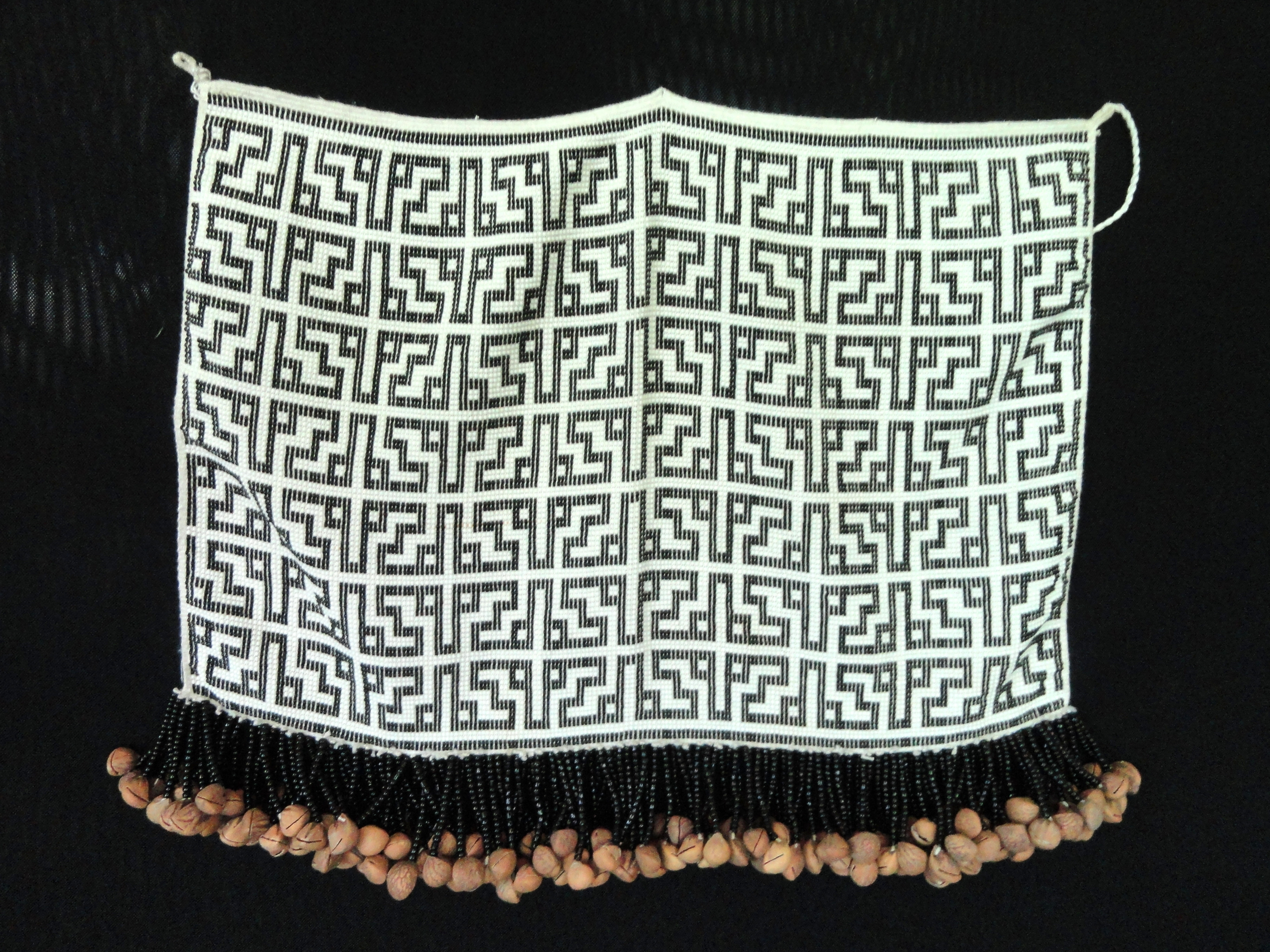
Tiriyó-kaxuyana beadwork. Memorial dos Povos Indígenas.

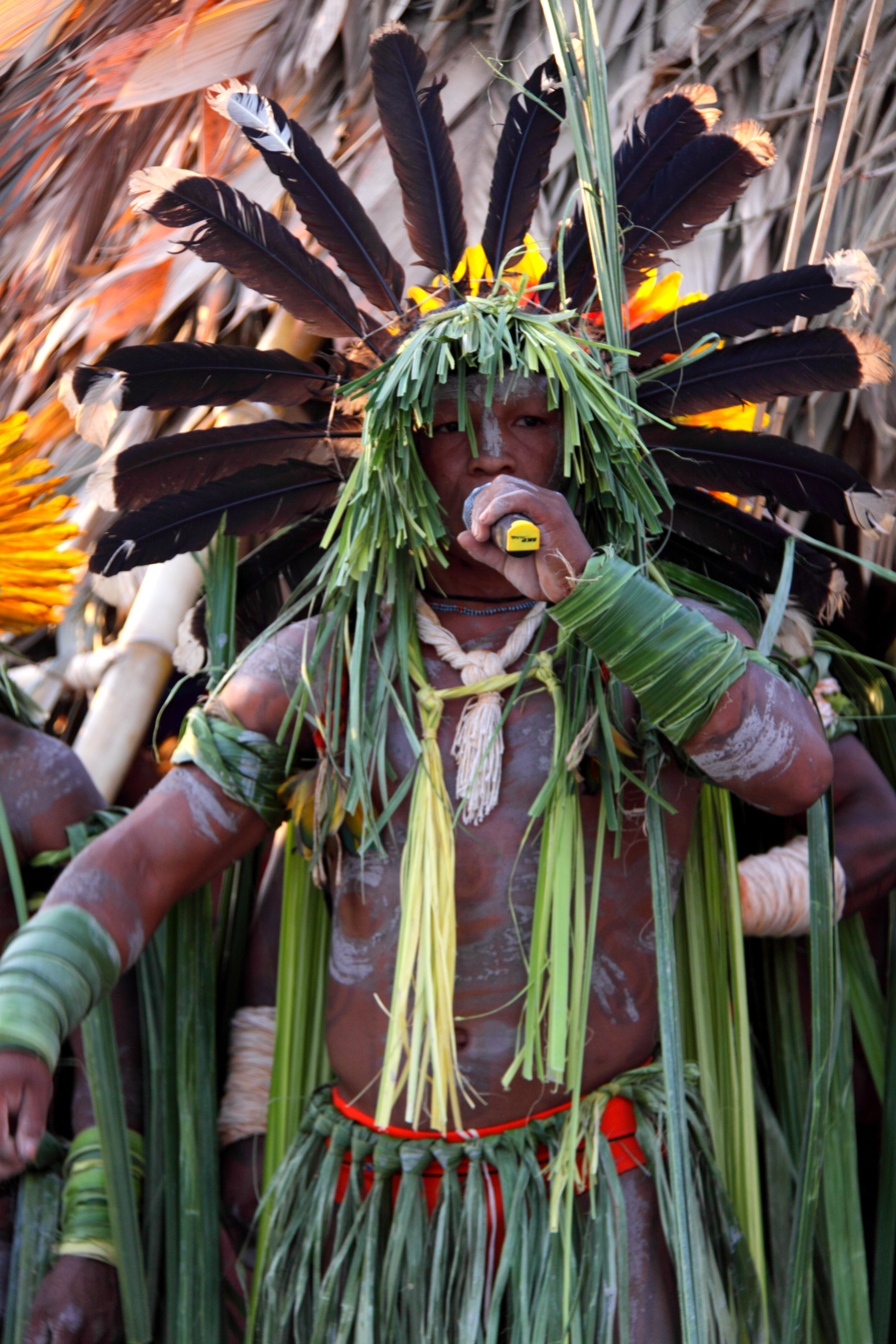
Enawene-nawe body-art.

== Baroque ==
The first Western artists active in Brazil were Roman Catholic priests who came from Portugal to "civilize" the Indians. Jesuits assumed an important role in this process, with their many missionary establishments called "Reductions" teaching religion through art in the form of sacred plays, music, statuary, and painting. José de Anchieta was the first important playwright; Agostinho de Jesus and Agostinho da Piedade produced the first known sculptures; Belchior Paulo, João Filipe Bettendorff, Ricardo do Pilar, and a few others did the first paintings; while Francisco de Vaccas and Pedro da Fonseca started organizing the musical life of the infant colony. Basílio da Gama and Gregório de Mattos were the first secular poets. All of them worked under the influence of the Baroque, the dominant style in Brazil until the early 19th century.

Through the 17th and 18th centuries Baroque art flourished with increasing richness and craftsmanship, mainly in Bahia and Pernambuco along the coast and in some inland regions, reaching the highest levels of originality in Minas Gerais, where a gold rush nurtured a rich and cultured local society. In Minas lived the greatest artists of Brazilian Baroque: painter Manuel da Costa Ataíde and sculptor-architect Aleijadinho. Minas was also the birthplace of a proto-Neoclassical school of music and literature, with composers Lobo de Mesquita and Francisco Gomes da Rocha, and poets Tomás Antônio Gonzaga and Cláudio Manuel da Costa.

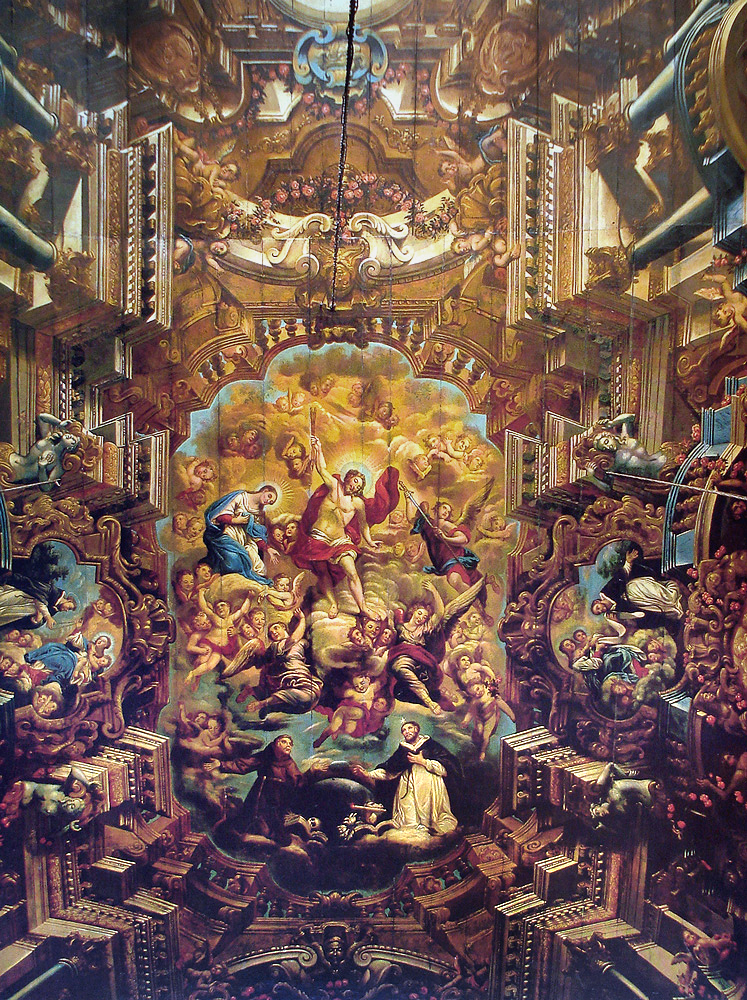
José Joaquim da Rocha: Painted ceiling of St. Dominicus Church, Salvador

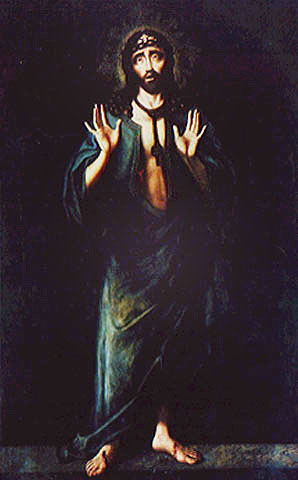
Ricardo do Pilar: Man of sorrows, c. 1690

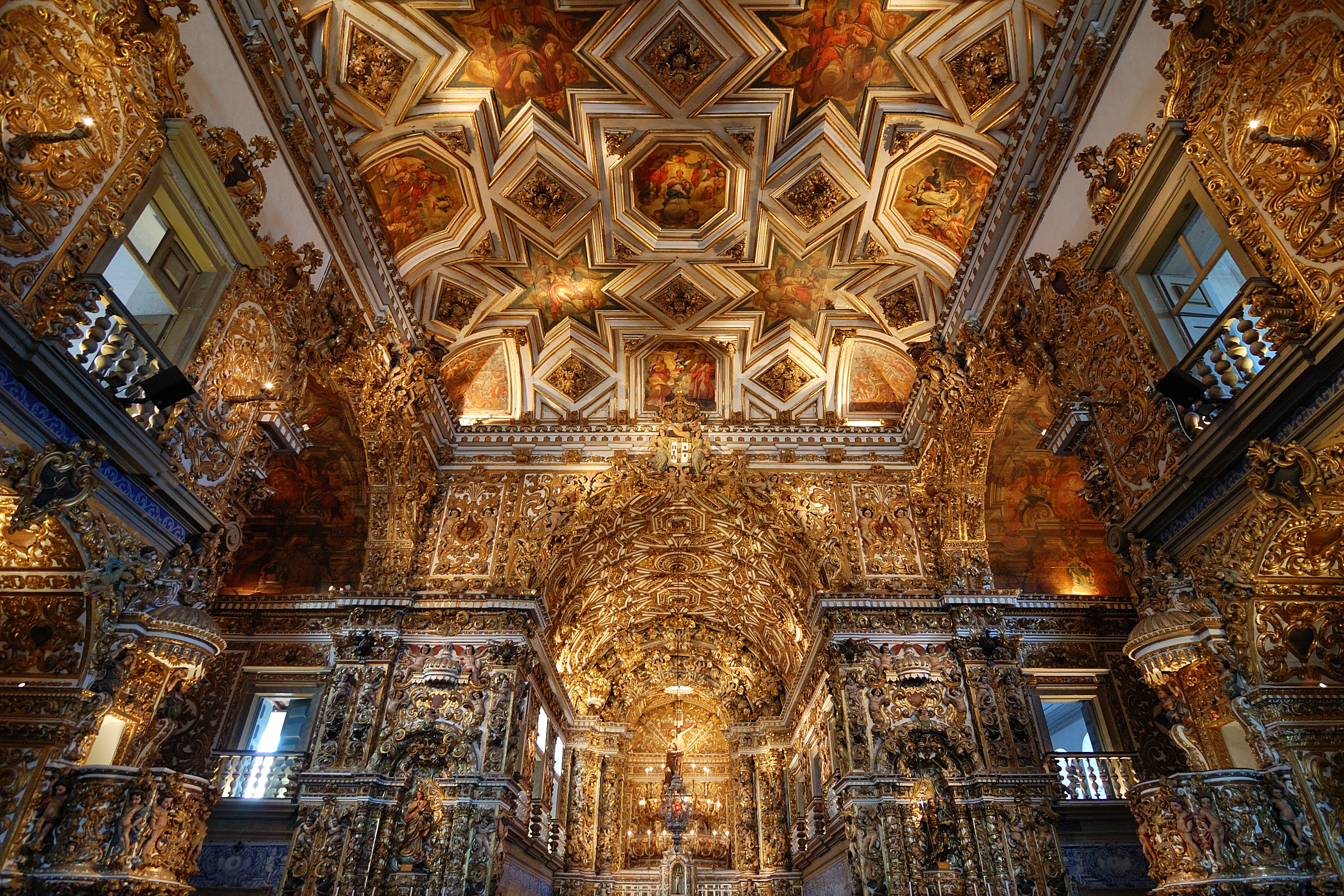
São Francisco Church, Salvador

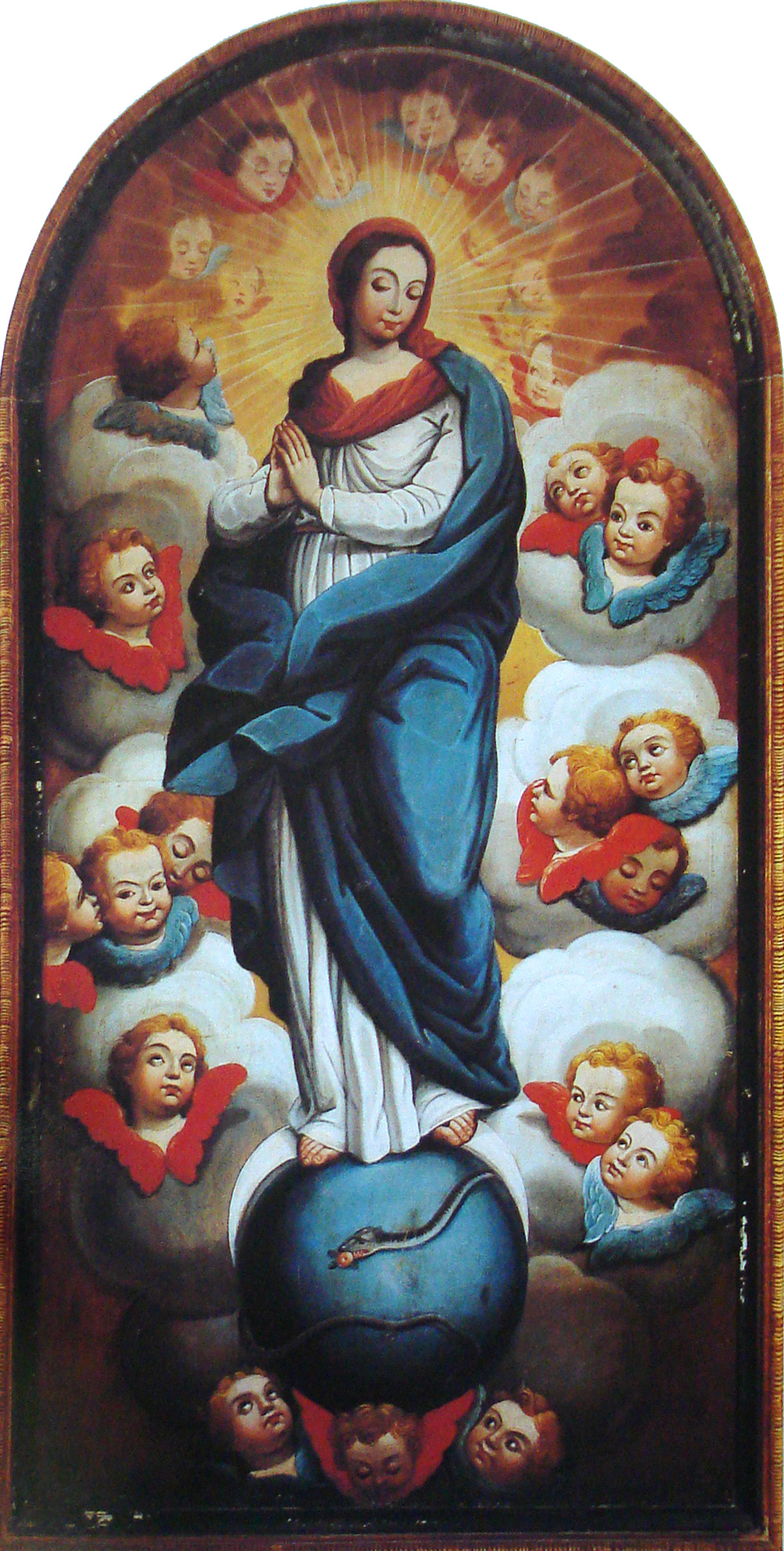
João Nepomuceno Correia e Castro: Immaculate Conception. Museu da Inconfidência
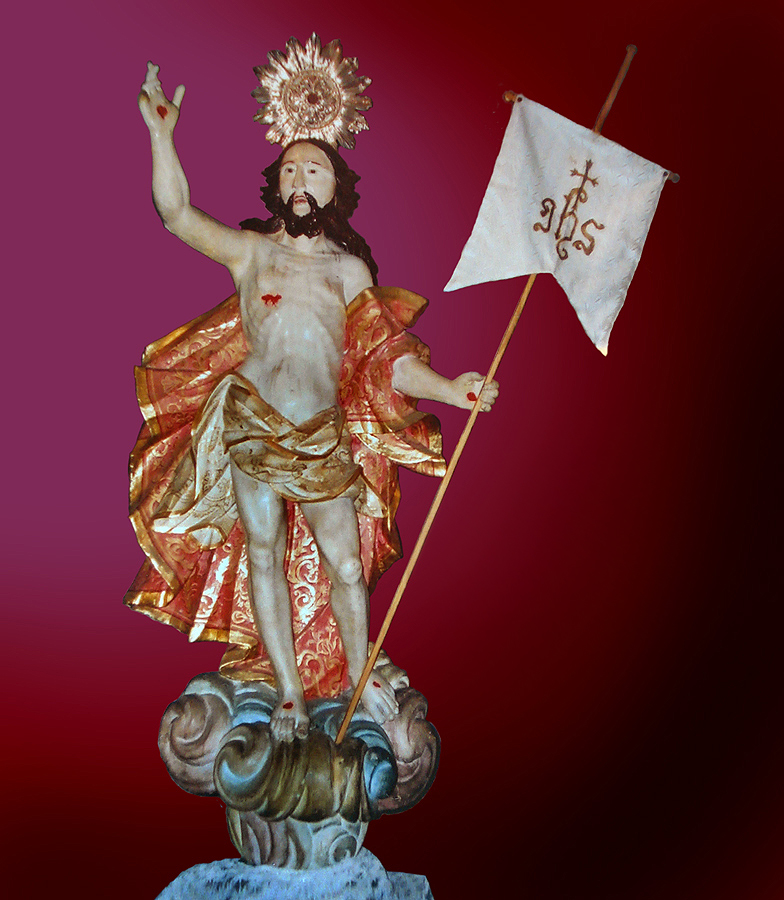
School of Bahia: Christ the Savior.

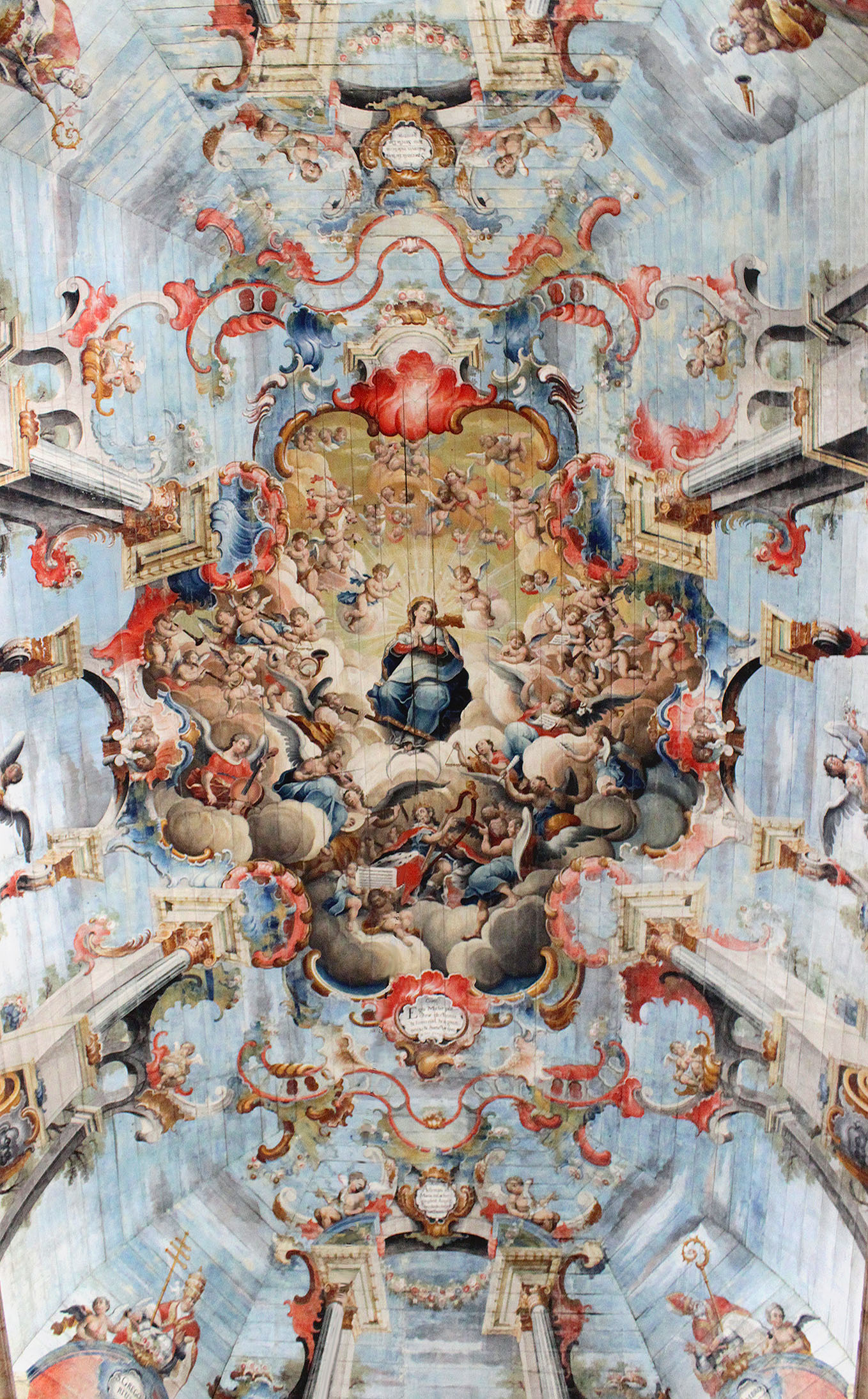
Ataíde: Our Lady surrounded by musician angels, Church of Saint Francis of Assisi, Ouro Preto

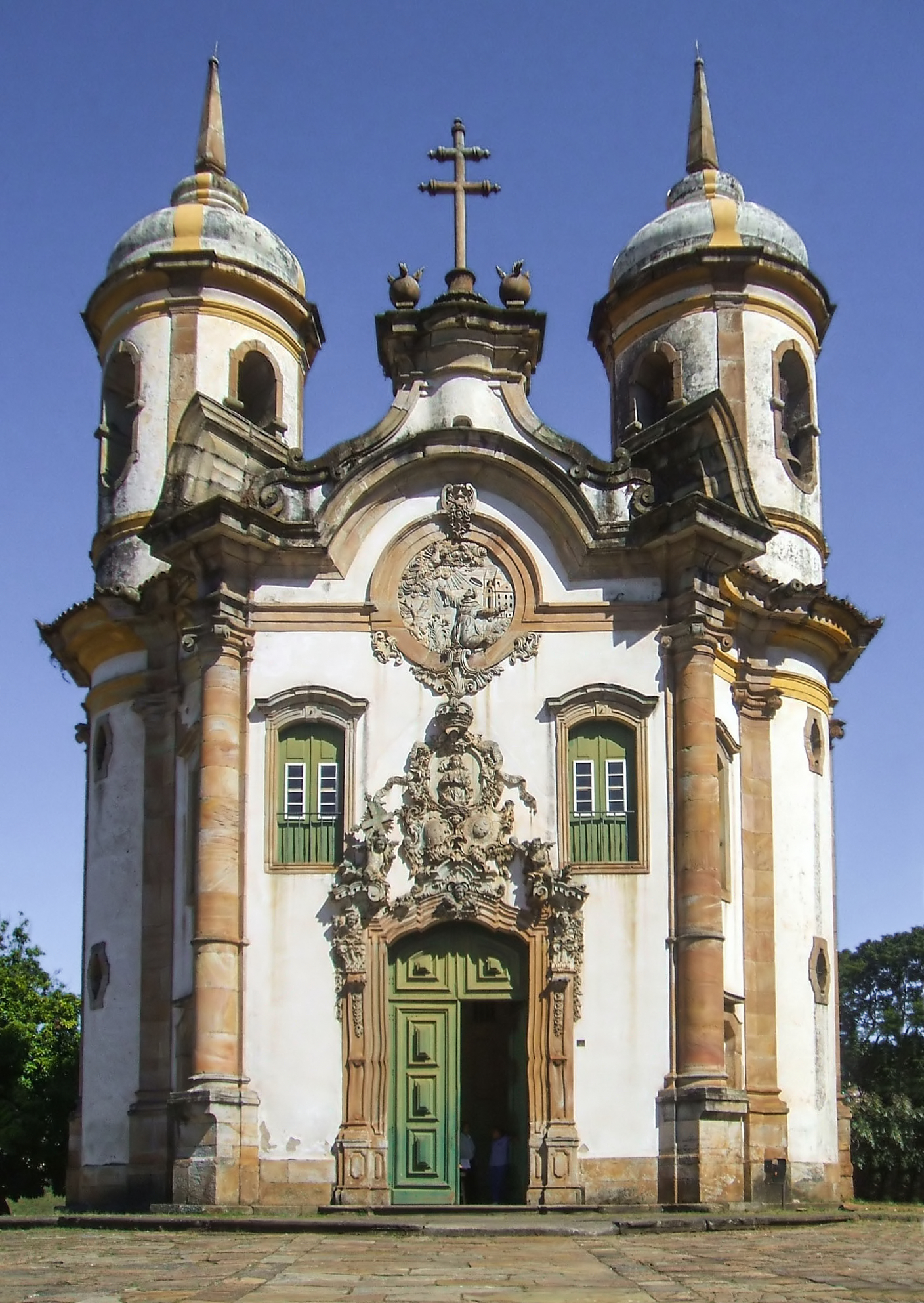
Aleijadinho and Francisco de Lima Cerqueira: Church of Saint Francis of Assisi, Ouro Preto

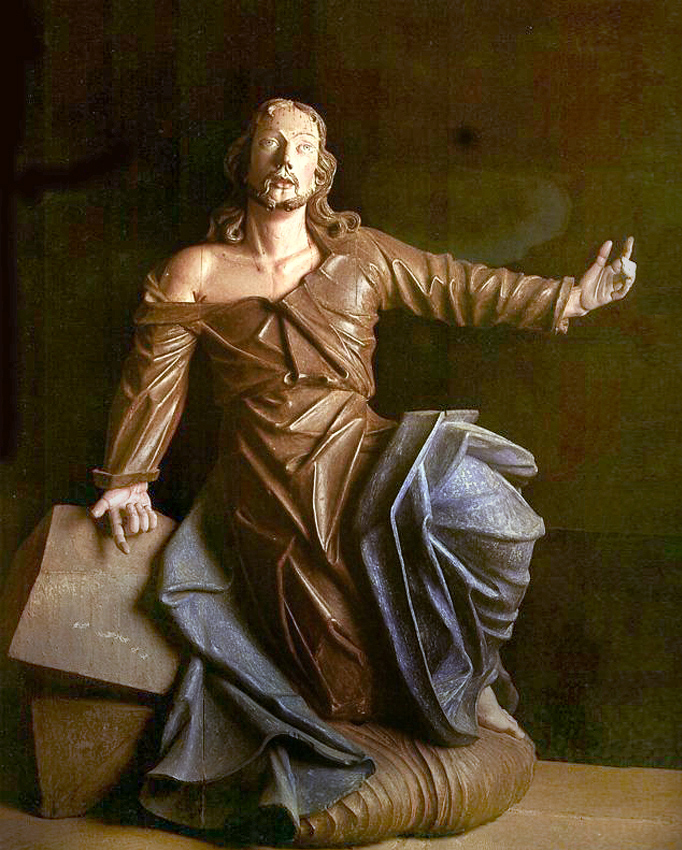
Aleijadinho: Christ praying, Bom Jesus de Matosinhos Sanctuary

== 19th century: Neoclassicism, Romanticism, Realism ==
One single event in the 19th century sowed the seeds for a complete renewal in Brazilian visual arts: the arrival of the French Artistic Mission in 1816, which strongly reinforced the Neoclassical style, previously seen in Brazil only in timid attempts. Joachim Lebreton, its leader, proposed the creation of an Academy of Fine Arts, later restructured as the Imperial Academy of Fine Arts. The academy was the most important center for the visual arts through nearly the whole of the 19th century. It imposed a new concept of artistic education and was the basis for a revolution in Brazilian painting, sculpture, architecture, graphic arts, and crafts. A few decades later, under the personal patronage of Emperor Pedro II, who was engaged in an ambitious national project of modernization, the academy reached its golden age, fostering the emergence of the first generation of Romantic painters. Victor Meirelles and Pedro Américo, among others, produced lasting visual symbols of national identity. It must be said that in Brazil Romanticism in painting took a peculiar shape, not showing the overwhelming dramaticism, fantasy, violence, or interest in death and the bizarre commonly seen in the European version, and because of its academic and palatial nature all excesses were eschewed.

Pedro Américo: Independence or Death!, 1888. Museu Paulista

Meanwhile, literature too evolved towards a romantic-nationalist school with the works of Casimiro de Abreu and Manuel Antônio de Almeida. Around 1850, a transition began, centered upon Álvares de Azevedo, who was influenced by the poetry of Lord Byron. This second generation of Romantics was obsessed with morbidness and death, and soon after, social commentary could be found in literature, both features not seen in the visual arts. Antônio Castro Alves wrote of the horrors of slavery, and the persecuted Indians were rescued through art by poets and novelists like Antônio Gonçalves Dias and José de Alencar. These trends combined in one of the most important accomplishments of the Romantic era in Brazil: the establishment of a Brazilian national identity based on Indian ancestry and the rich natural environment of the country.

In music, the 19th century produced only two composers of outstanding talent: neoclassical sacred composer José Maurício Nunes Garcia, for a while music director to the court, and later, Romantic operist Carlos Gomes, the first Brazilian musician to win international acclaim.

In the late 19th century, Brazilian art became acquainted with Realism. Descriptions of nature and of the people of Brazil's varied regions as well as psychological romances proliferated with João Simões Lopes Neto, Aluísio Azevedo, Euclides da Cunha, and, above all, Machado de Assis, while Almeida Júnior, Pedro Weingärtner, Oscar Pereira da Silva, and other Realist painters depicted folk types and the distinctive colors and light of Brazilian landscape.

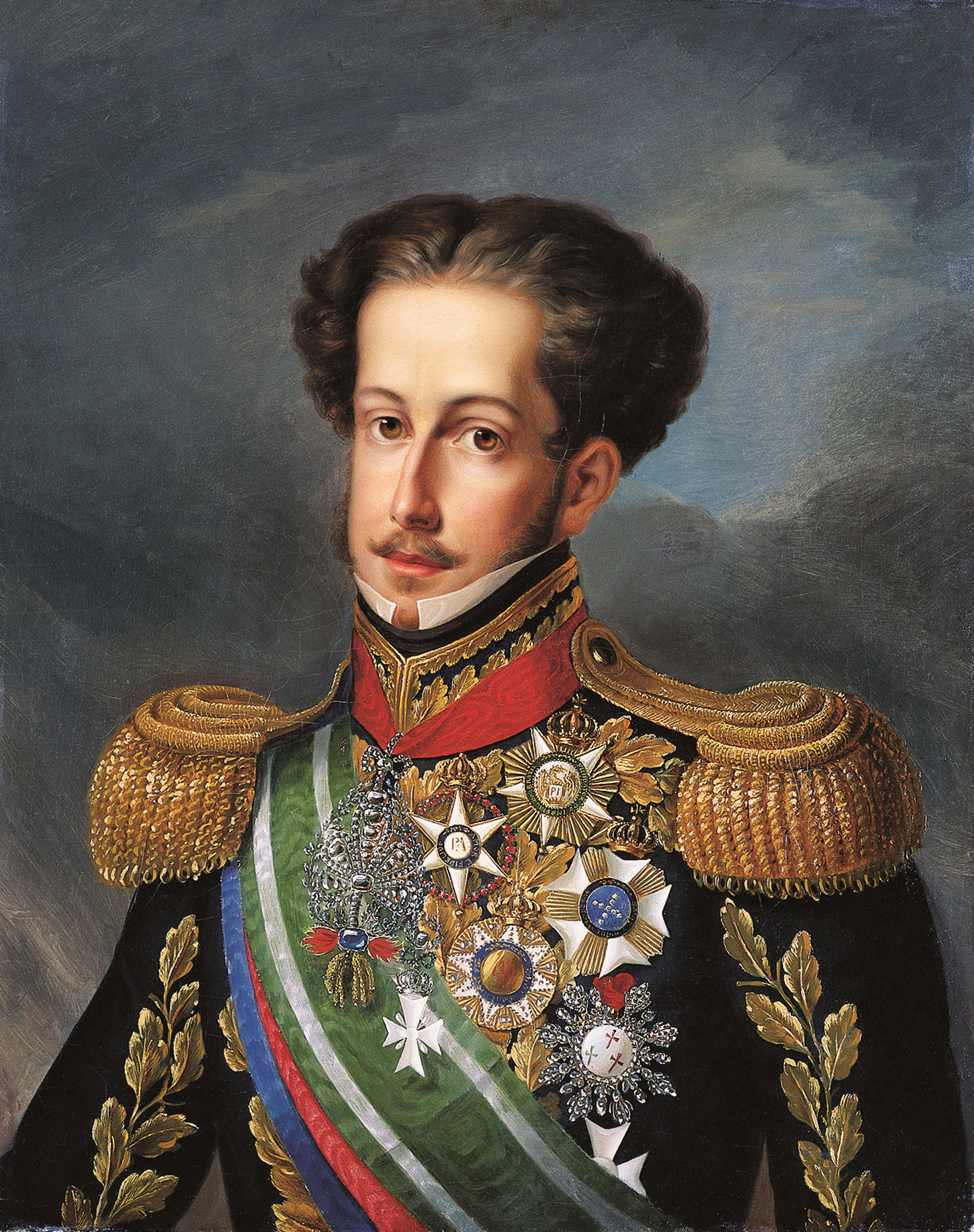
Simplício de Sá: Portrait of Peter I, ca. 1830. Imperial Museum

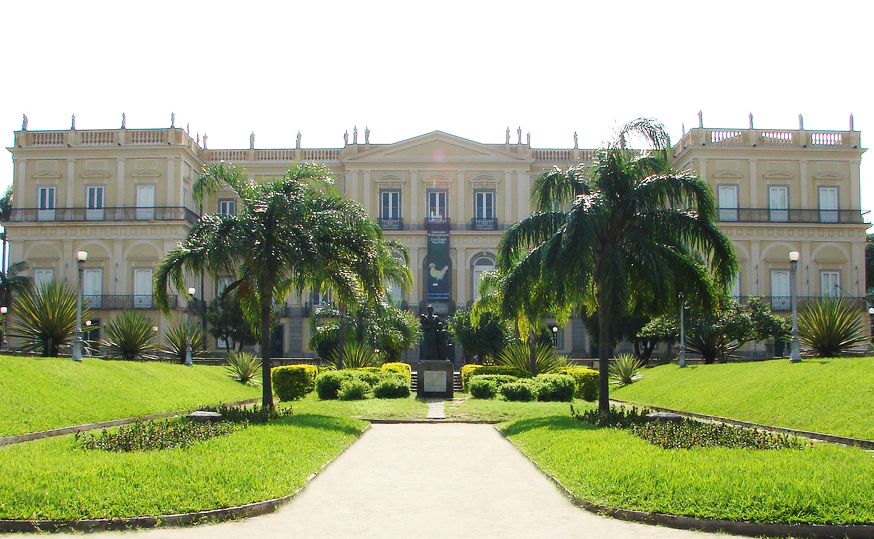
São Cristóvão, Rio de Janeiro

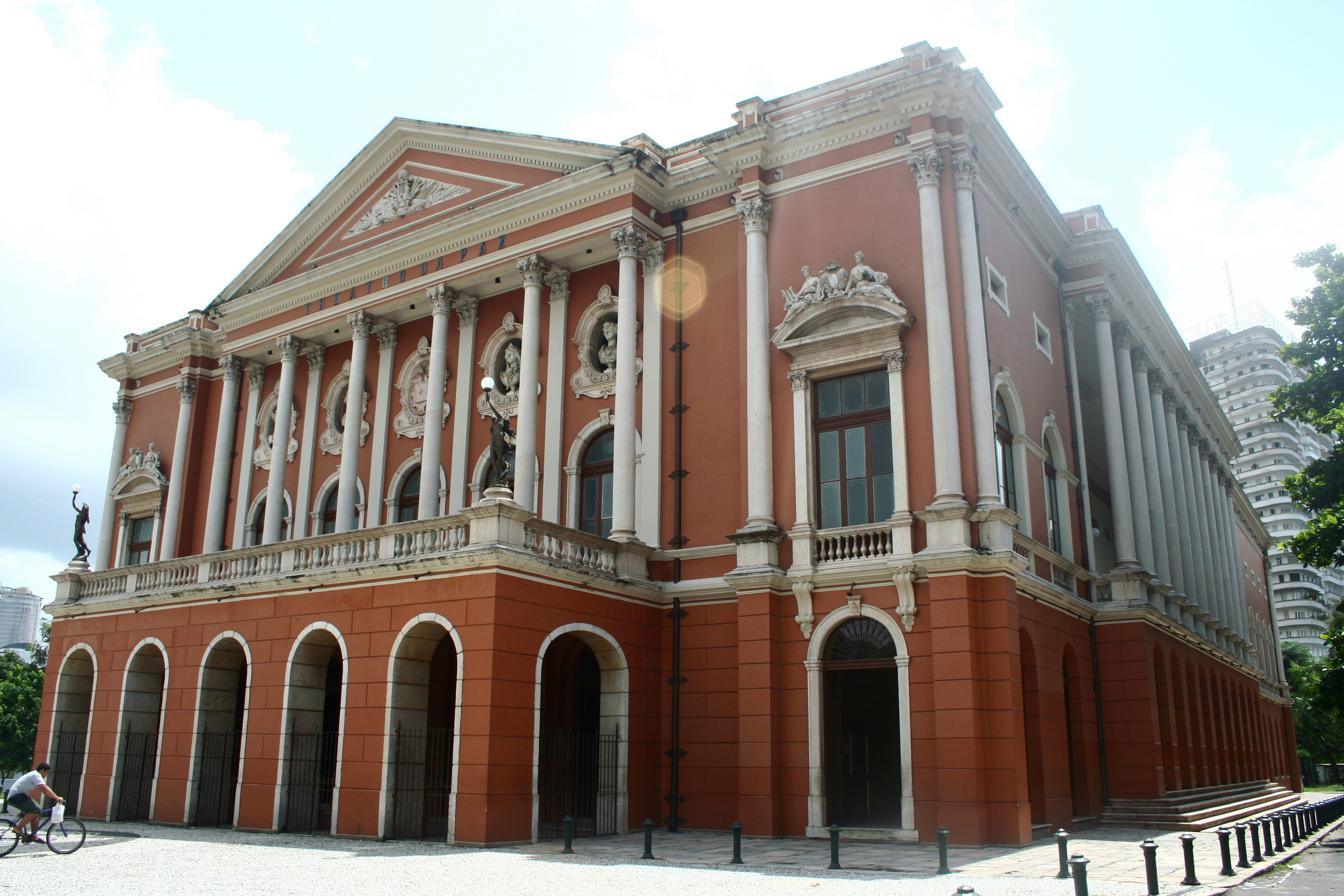
Theatro da Paz, Belém do Pará

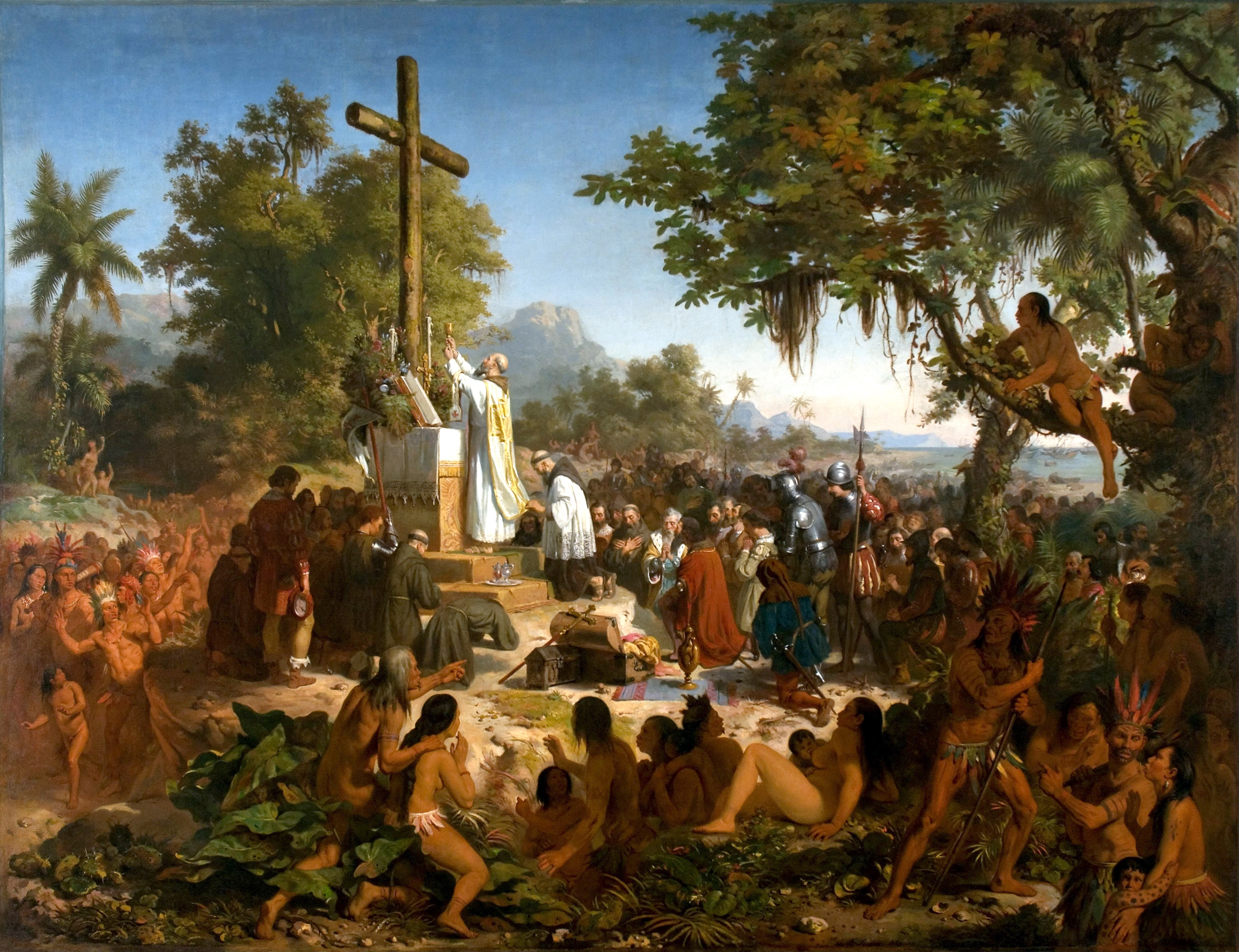
Victor Meirelles: The first Mass in Brazil, 1861. Museu Nacional de Belas Artes
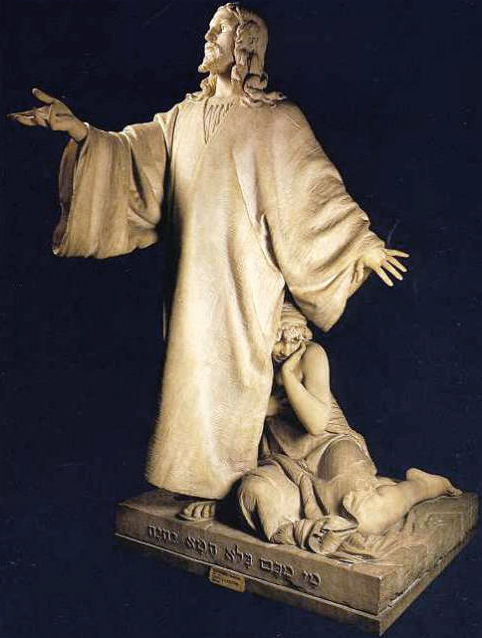
Rodolpho Bernardelli: Christ and the adulterous woman, 1881

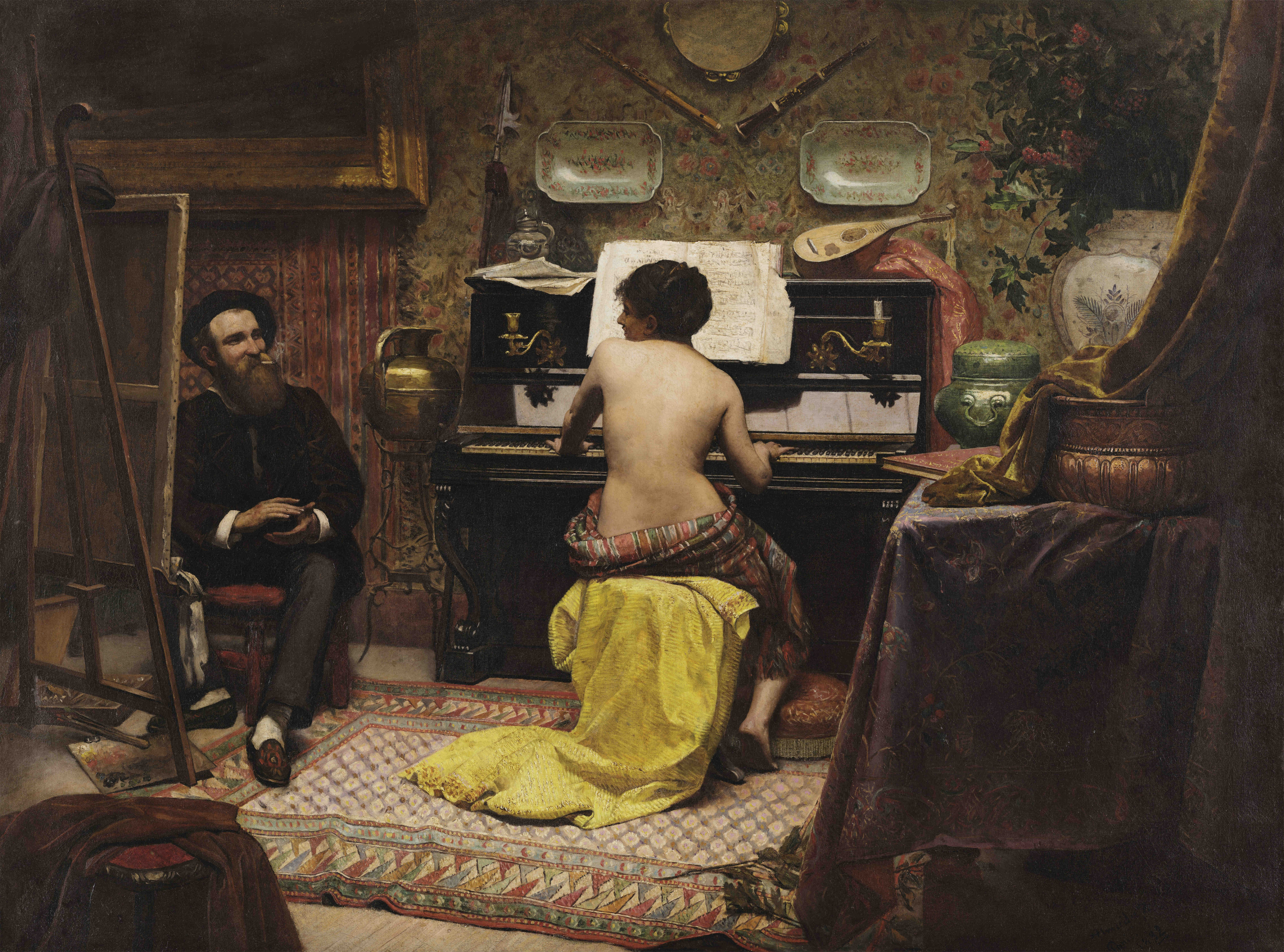
Almeida Júnior: Model's rest, 1882. Museu Nacional de Belas Artes

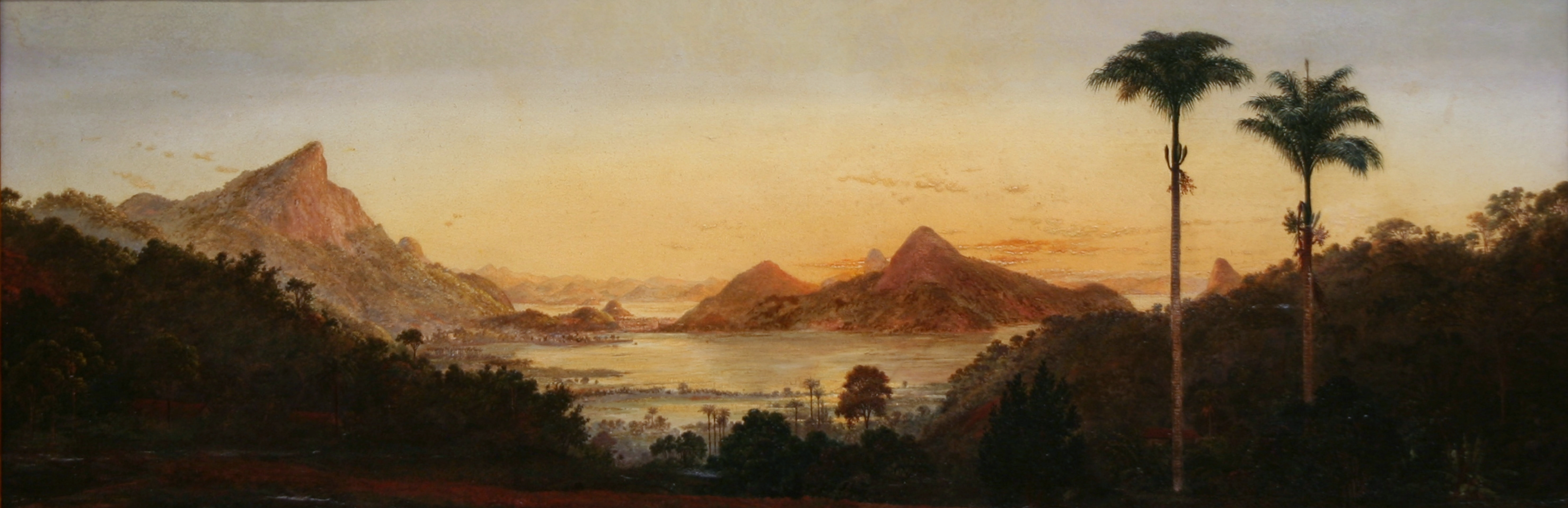
Nicola Facchinetti: Rodrigo de Freitas lagoon, ca. 1884

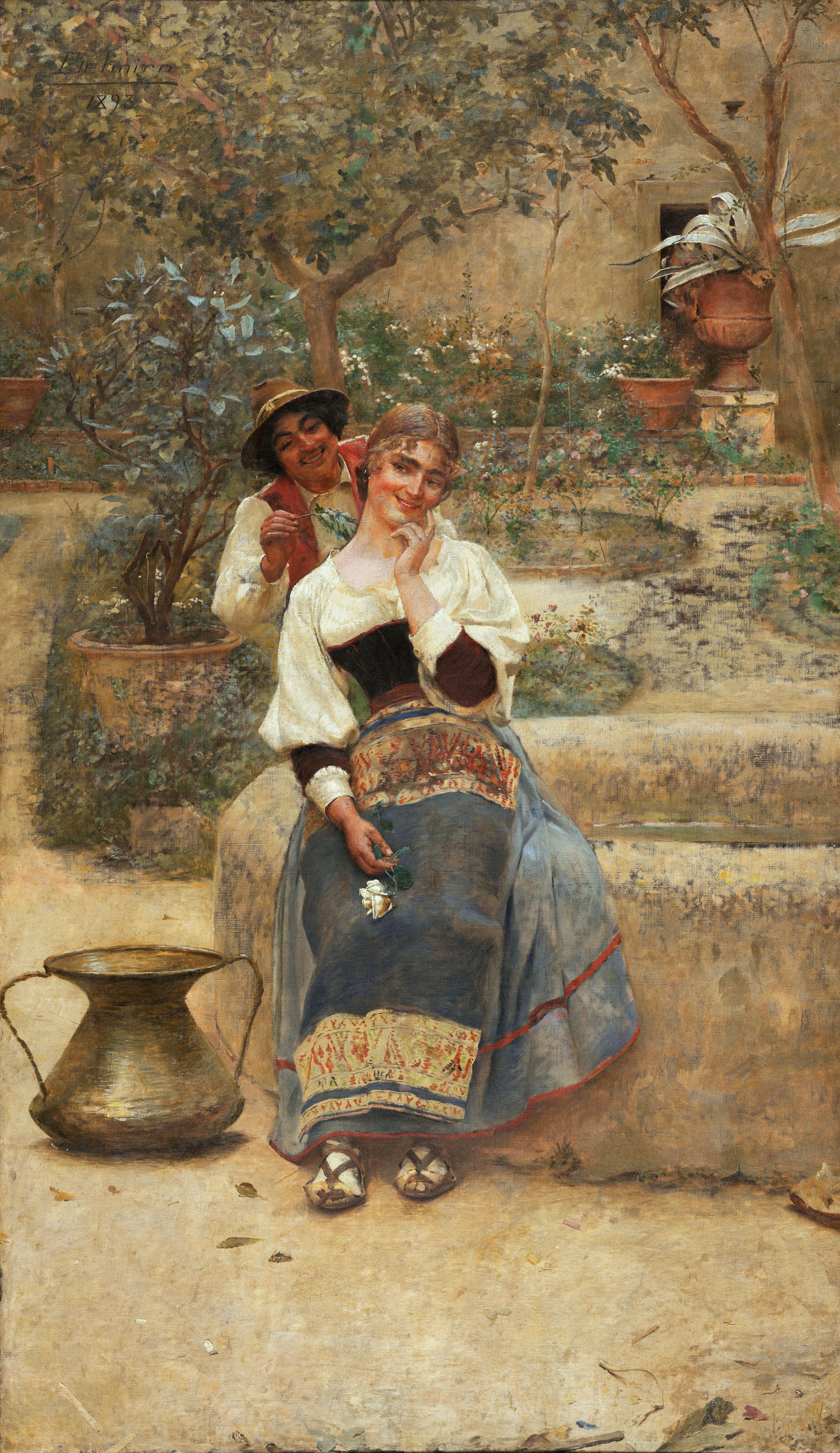
Belmiro de Almeida: Effects of sunlight, 1893

=== Slavery and Brazilian art ===
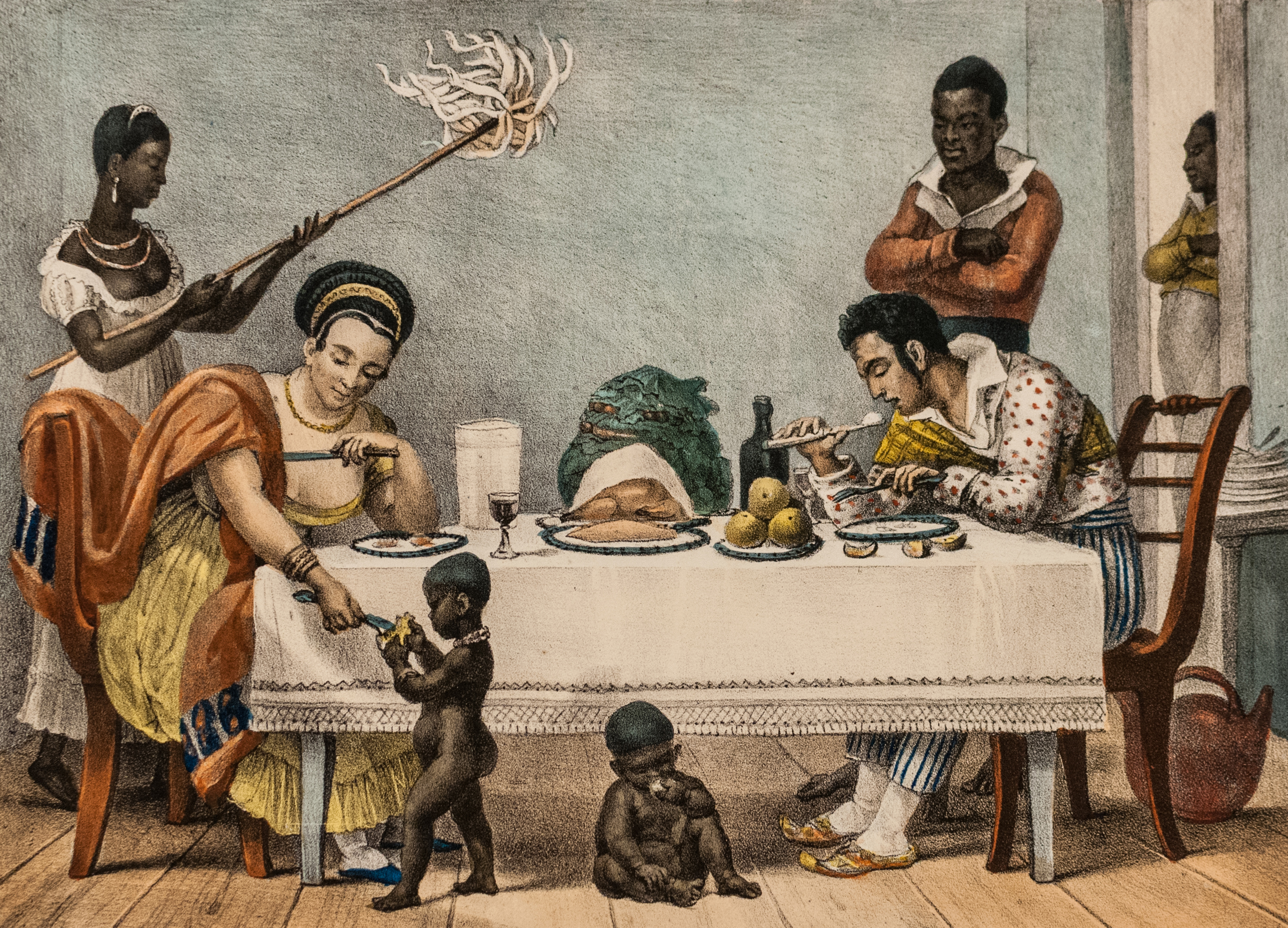
Jean-Baptiste Debret: A Brazilian Family in Rio de Janeiro. c 1839

The introduction of the French Artistic Mission led to multiple artists to create artwork that documented the lives of enslaved people in Brazil. Artists like Jean-Baptiste Debret who were part of the French Artistic Mission, portrayed enslaved people's day to day lives and parts of their culture. These ranged from artworks of the variation of types of labor, the workplaces like sugar mills, plantations, domestic labor, and using enslaved people as life studies as they rested from labor. Some artwork of depicting labor would be made for documentation for political figures ranging from landscape pieces in plantations with workers being in the smaller parts of the composition of the piece. Punishment was another scene or subject used for artwork as documentation of part of the life of an enslaved person and to present it as a warning to others of the consequences. One example would be depictions of public whippings. The purpose of the public whipping depicted in art depended on the artist and their views on slavery. This could either be to spread awareness of the violence or to warn the consequences if enslaved people were out of order.

Artists also used enslaved people as subjects in portraits. These portraits would range in the matter of how the artist wanted to portray the subject from documentation of ethnographs like Albert Eckhout's paintings or in European style attire to bring them closer to the appearance of a white Brazilian status.

==== The Academy of Fine Arts and Slavery ====
When the Academy of Fine Arts was established, the school had planned to introduce figure drawing classes with live models. The academy wanted to hold similar standards to art schools in Europe, including the type of models used for these sessions. However the school struggled to find people who would fit the body, age range, and skin color for a model. Educators of the academy who were also slave owners would bring in enslaved people as live models for the students becoming another type of labor. Some of these live models were paid but the money would go to the slave owner instead. The academy continued to use black models, until shifting interest back to a Eurocentric aesthetic and the introduction of immigrants from Europe as live models. Outside of using enslaved people as live models the Imperial Academy of Fine Arts also used slave labor in the import of European artwork for the academy's usage for students like the statue cast of Laocoon and his Sons.

== 20th century: Modern Art ==
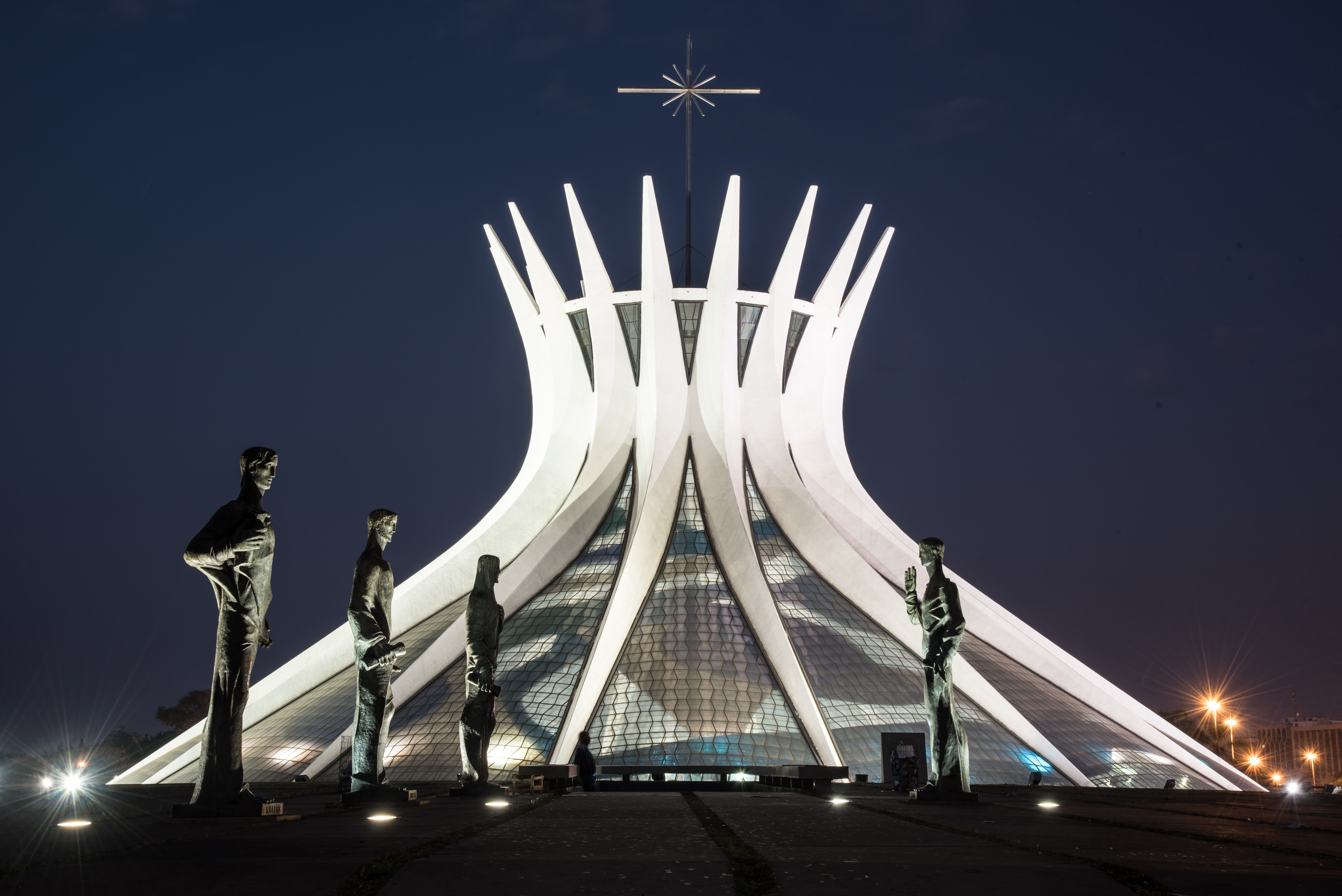
Oscar Niemeyer: Cathedral of Brasília. The statues are works by Alfredo Ceschiatti

The beginning of the 20th century saw a struggle between old schools and modernist trends. The Week of Modern Art festival, held in São Paulo in 1922, was received with fiery criticism by conservative sectors of the society, but it was a landmark in the history of Brazilian art. It included plastic arts exhibitions, lectures, concerts, and the reading of poems. Due to the radicalism (for the times) of some of their poems and music, the artists were vigorously booed and pelted by the audience, and the press and art critics in general were strong in their condemnation. However, those artists are now seen as the founders of Modern art in Brazil. Modernist literature and theory of art were represented by Oswald de Andrade, Sérgio Milliet, Menotti del Picchia, and Mário de Andrade, whose revolutionary novel Macunaíma (1928) is one of the founding texts of Brazilian Modernism. Painting was represented by Anita Malfatti, Tarsila do Amaral, Emiliano Di Cavalcanti, Lasar Segall, Vicente do Rego Monteiro; sculpture by Victor Brecheret; and music by Heitor Villa-Lobos, the leader of a new musical nationalism, among many others.

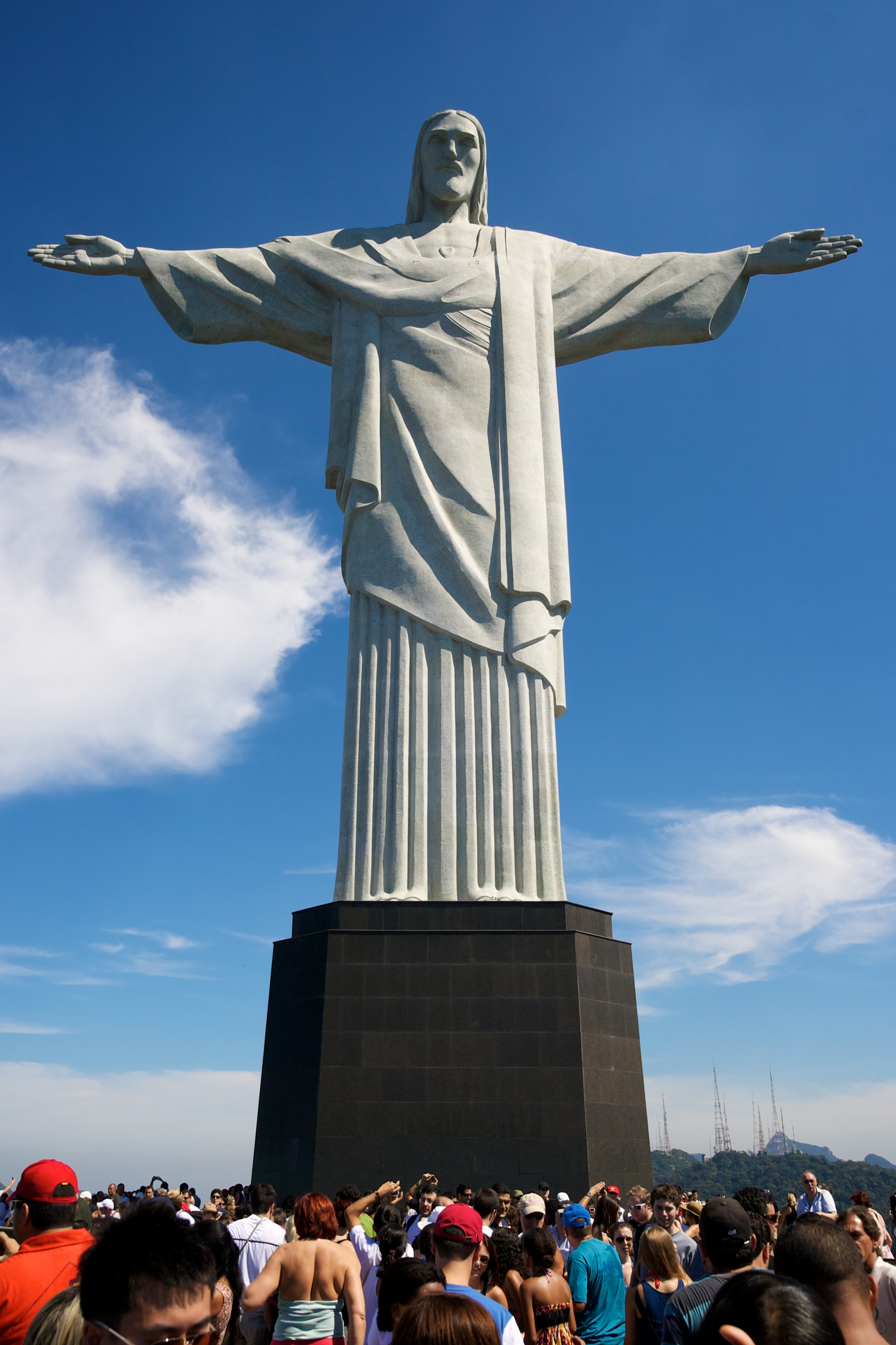
Christ the Redeemer, Rio de Janeiro, by Paul Landowski and Gheorghe Leonida, 1931

The Week not only introduced to a wider public modern, experimental tendencies derived from European Expressionism, Cubism, and Surrealism, but also wanted to make use of national folklore as a basis for an art more relevant to the Brazilian reality, with an enhanced social awareness. This "cannibalization" of European movements and transformation into genuine Brazilian expression is the motto between the Anthropophagic Manifesto, published by Oswald de Andrade in 1928, that draws parallels between art history and the cannibal rituals of the Tupi people.

However, the radicalism of those first Modernists could not last for long in a society accustomed to traditional fashions, and the original core members had separated by 1929, pursuing individual paths. What Brazilian art then became was a mix of some important achievements of the Modernists, meaning freedom from the strict academic agenda, with more conventional traits, giving birth in the following generation to a moderate Modernism, best exemplified by painter Cândido Portinari, who was something like the official painter of the Brazilian government in mid-century.

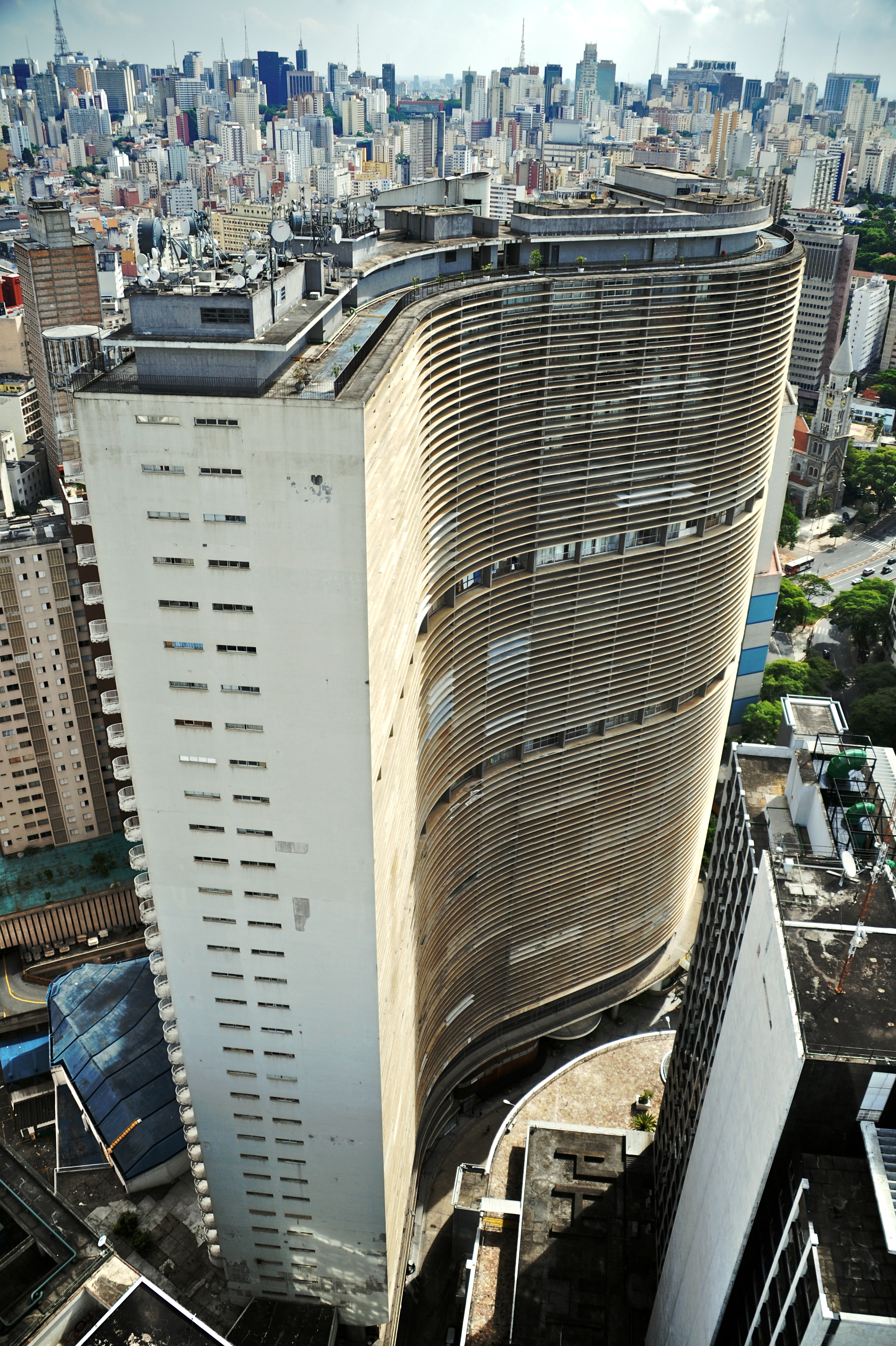
Oscar Niemeyer: Copan Building

Within the group of Brazilian artists, Chico Niedzielski's artwork has been spread all over the country. His work is known to be inspired by Sacred Geometry, breaking the tendency to focus on Brazilian themes and searching for a more universal and atemporal form of Brazilian art. The erosion of radical Modernism in the visual arts in the early 20th century was not reflected in Brazilian literature. Clarice Lispector wrote existentialist novels and developed a highly personal style, filled with stream-of-consciousness and epiphanies. João Guimarães Rosa changed the face of Brazilian literature with his experimental language, and playwright Nelson Rodrigues dealt with crime, prejudice, passion, and sexual pathologies. In the 1950s, painting and sculpture regained strength through Abstractionism, and architecture began also to display advanced features, influenced by Le Corbusier. Its greatest achievement was the urban core of Brasília, designed by urbanist Lúcio Costa and architect Oscar Niemeyer, now a World Heritage Site.

== 1960s onwards: Contemporary Art ==
Around the 1960s, the so-called "modernist" art movements started giving way to most contemporary means of expression, such as appropriation, political art, Conceptual art and Pop. Right at the turn of the decade, some Brazilian Concrete artists began ditching the traditional "strictness" of concrete art in favor of a more phenomenological approach, exploring the relations between the art object and the viewer. Among the primary leaders of this Neo-Concrete movement were the poet Ferreira Gullar, and the visual artists Hélio Oiticica, Lygia Pape and Lygia Clark, this last one internationally cited as one of the most influential artists of the 20th century.

The Coup d'état of 1964 and subsequent restriction of civil rights and freedom of expression in Brazil is commonly marked as the shifting point, whence artists such as Cildo Meireles and Rubens Gerchman began creating explicitly political art. Particularly after 1968, when the military government legalized torture, Brazilian art was marked by rather radical actions and happenings. The São Paulo Art Biennial, the second oldest art biennial in the world, opened up with most of its walls empty due to a boycott from the artists. In 1970, the exhibit Do Corpo à Terra ("From Body to Earth") took place in Belo Horizonte, and included rather shocking actions such as Cildo Meireles setting live chickens on fire in front of a live audience and Artur Barrio ditching blood-soaked packages in a river, giving off the impression that the people who disappeared under the military government had "reappeared" in this gruesome fashion.

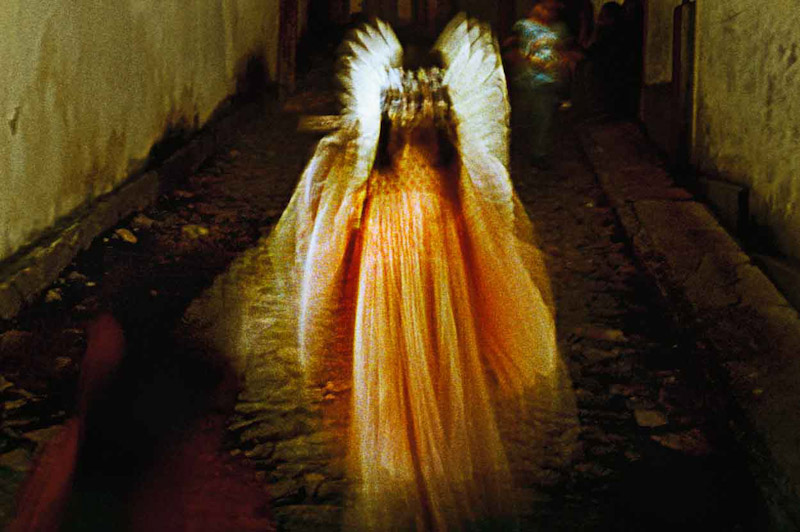
Holy week, Ouro Preto-MG, 2010. Chrome. Photo: Guy Veloso.

Brazilian Pop art didn't come without its share of criticism, sometimes adopting an outright rejection of consumer culture instead of the ambivalent, distant criticism of American pop. Waldemar Cordeiro is one of the most expressive artists that began exploring digital art and robotics in its work around the 60s and 70s, while Antonio Dias, Carlos Vergara brought the aesthetics of comic books, playing cards and other popular forms of visuality into his work. Hélio Oiticica's "Tropicália", a colorful immersive installation piece, incorporated references to the slums of Rio de Janeiro. The title relates to the cultural movement of the same name, that called back to the Antropophagic Manifesto of the 1920s to offer a more tongue-in-cheek perspective on the myths of an exotic and "wild" Brazil.

Some artists as: Hélio Oiticica, Lygia Clark, Naza, Cildo Meireles among others, have been featured on the international stage. A younger generation of Brazilian conceptual and experimental artists experience international acclaim for their refusal to perform the exoticism, including Paulo Nazareth, Cinthia Marcelle, Luana Vitra, Wisrah C. V. da R. Celestino, and Allan Weber.

=== Indigenous Artists ===
The Pinacoteca de São Paulo museum has become the first museum in over 100 years to host a contemporary Indigenous art exhibition. The exhibition is featured 23 Indigenous artists from various ethnicities across Brazil. The Véxoa exhibition showcases paintings, sculptures, videos, photographs and installations all with the political goal of capturing and drawing attention to important issues currently affecting the Indigenous population, which come in the form of agribusiness, deforestation, illegal mining and climate change.

The name of the Véxoa originates from the Terena language and translates to "We Know." The exhibition aims to break stereotypes surrounding Indigenous communities in Brazil. The curator of the museum has chosen a variety of Indigenous works which are both contemporary and traditional. The museum includes a diversity policy but does not group indigenous group the artist by ethnicity or chronological in order to emphasize the universalism of shared experiences by the native communities as more than 300 Indigenous group currently reside in Brazil according to Olinda Yawar. The exhibition include Indigenous film, photography, ceramics, embroidery and natural materials.

Ailton Krenak a leading Indigenous artist and philosopher has talked about the exhibition as "an opportunity to expose the extremely adverse times that Indigenous people are experiencing as a result of political violence perpetrated against their rights by the Brazilian State."

Jaider Esbell, another prominent artist in the exhibition, believes that, "Every exhibition of Indigenous art is primarily about exposing all the crimes that are taking place today". The artist focuses in widening different perspectives of Indigenous culture in order to illustrate the daily struggle and violence against indigenous communities. In a recent YouTube video Jaider has commented on the importance of Indigenous art as an intrinsic part of Indigenous culture and values. Jaider acknowledges the destruction of the Amazon rainforest as destroying traditions and indigenous communities. Jaider teaches a course at São Paulo's Museum of Modern Art.

Yakuña Tuxá an Indigenous female artist from Bahia has put forward multiple artworks that reflect the challenges of being an Indigenous woman in modern-day Brazil. The art focuses on Indigenous beauty and the prejudices faced by Indigenous women in big cities.

== Gallery ==
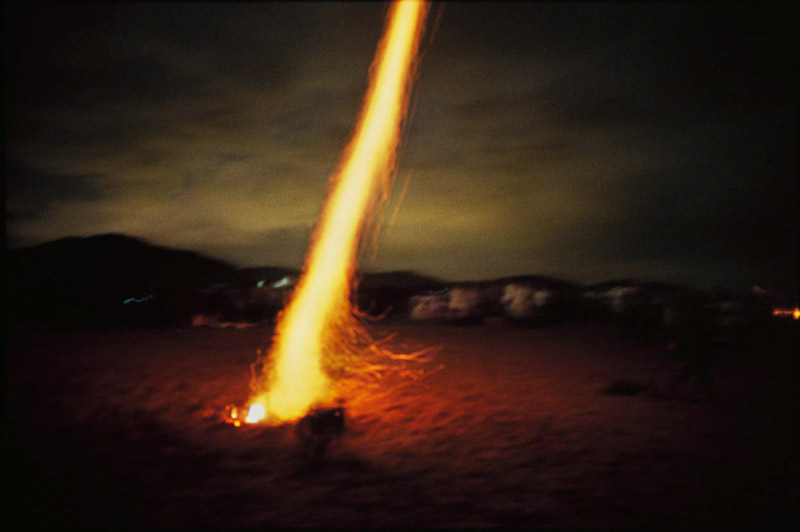
Florianópolis, Brazil. Photo: Guy Veloso, 2010

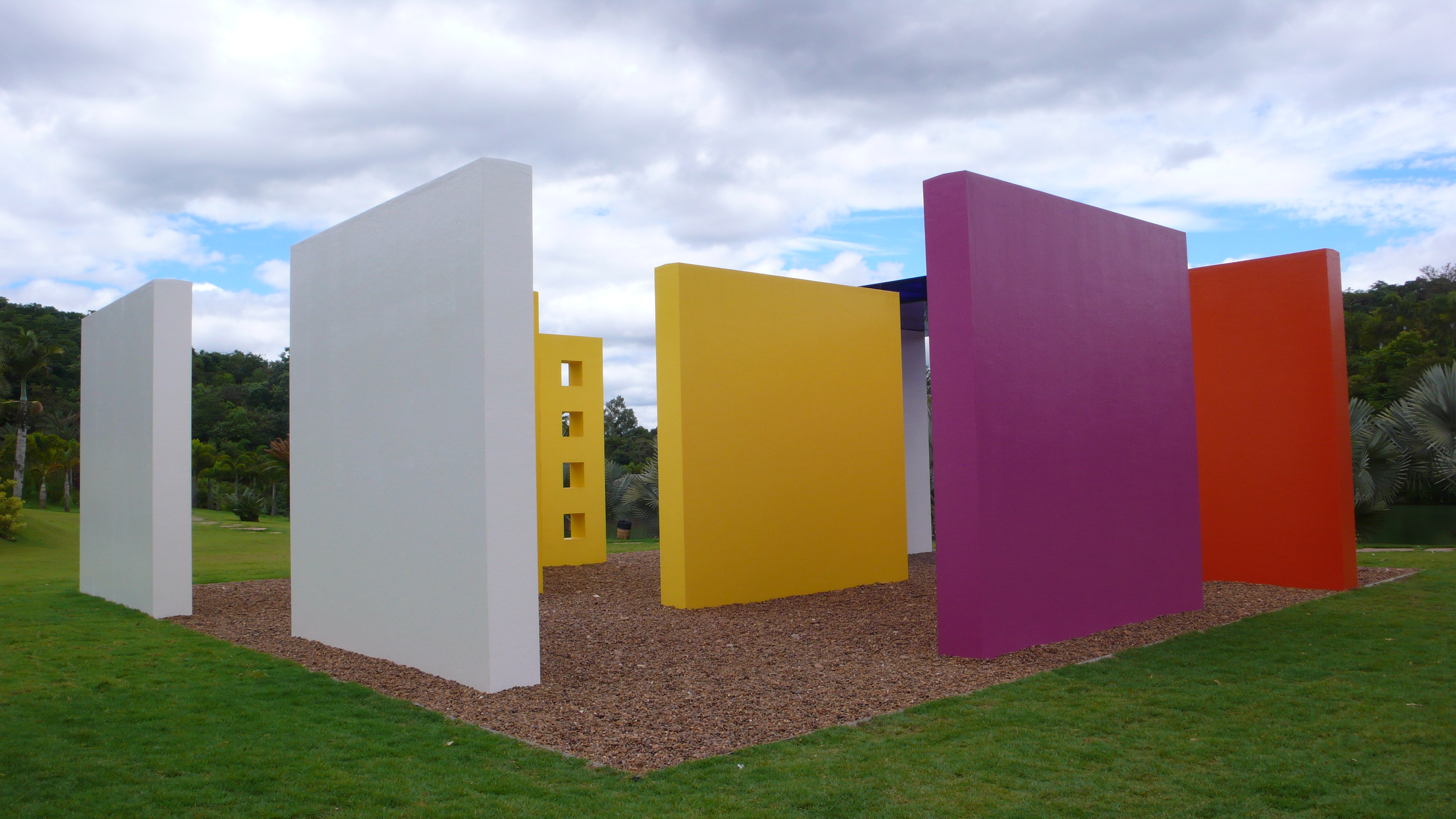
Hélio Oiticica:Labirintos Públicos
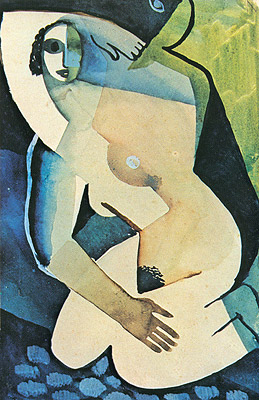
Ismael Nery: Nude woman crouching

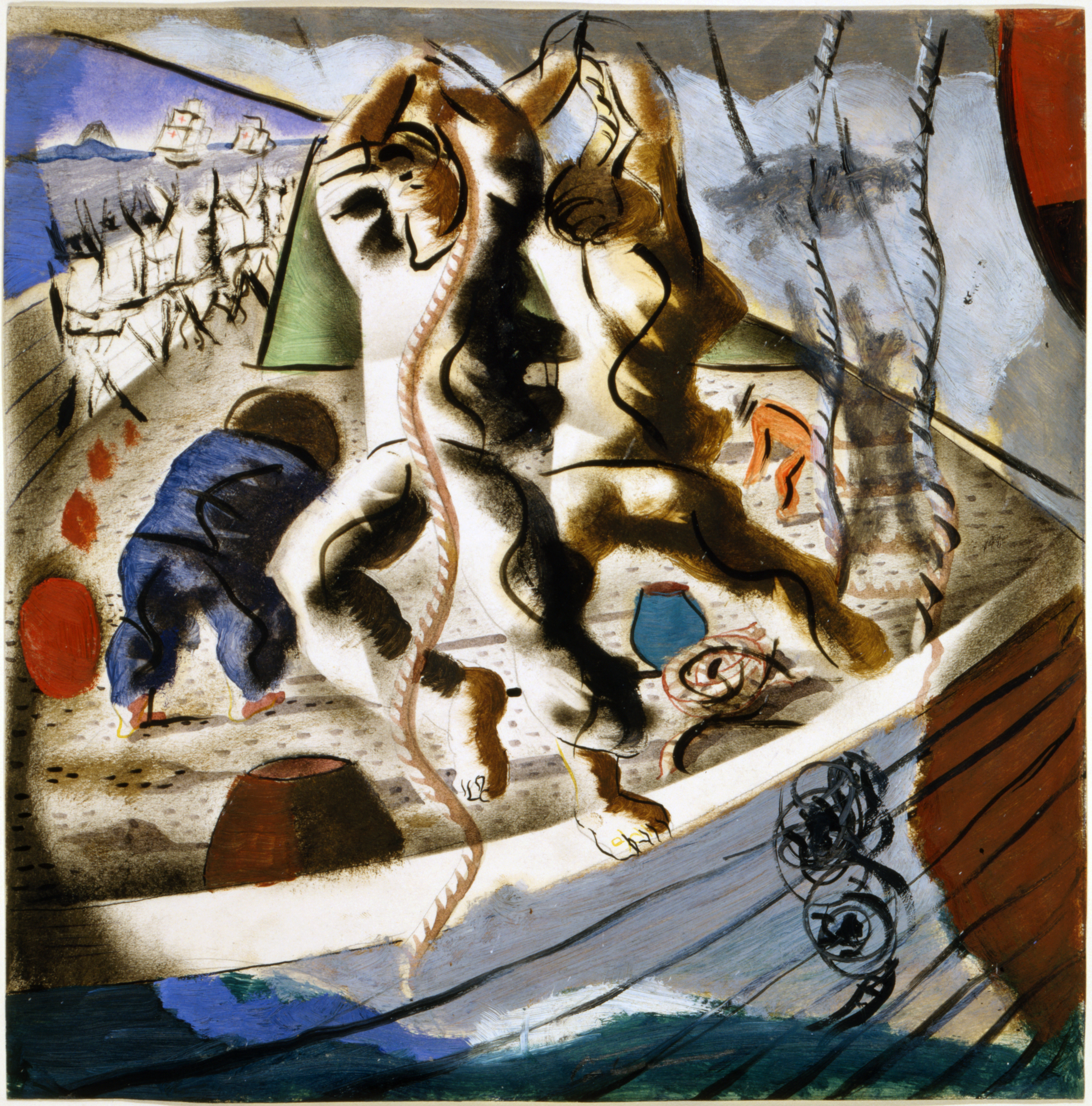
Cândido Portinari: Study for Discovery of the Land mural at the United States Library of Congress.

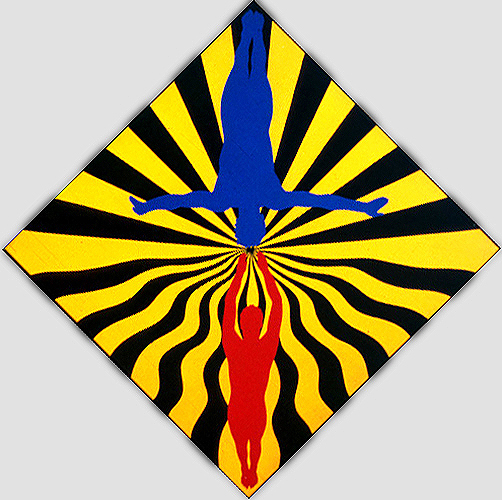
Milton Kurtz: Quasi contacto, 1989. Rio Grande do Sul Museum of Art
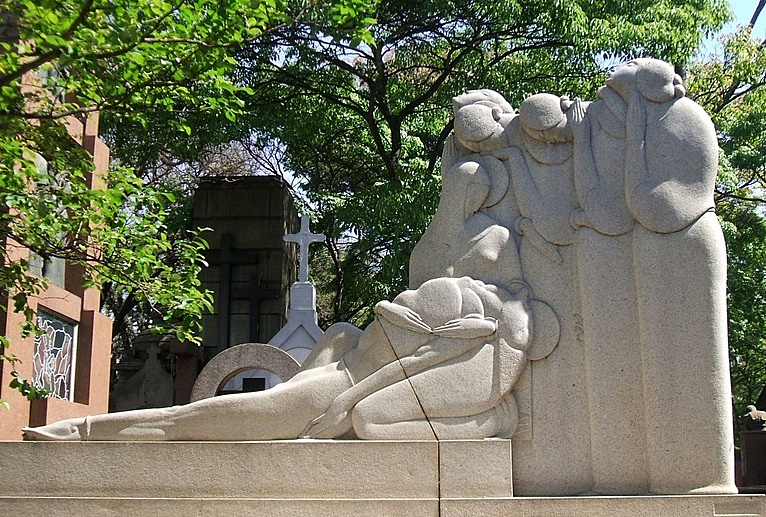
Victor Brecheret: Tomb of Olívia Guedes Penteado, São Paulo

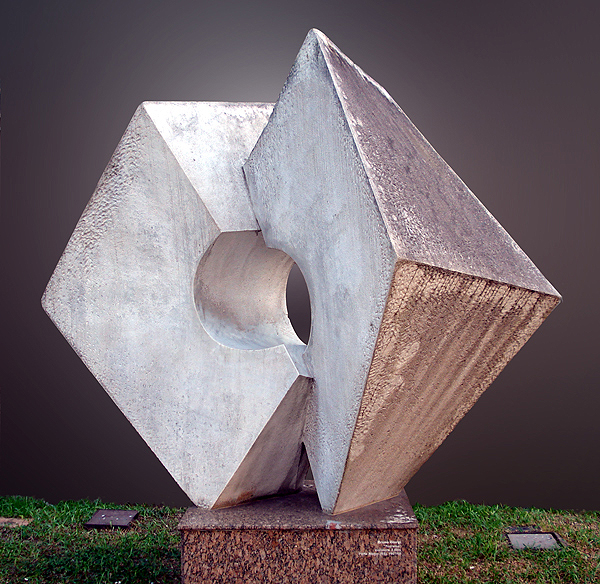
Theorem, by Bruno Giorgi

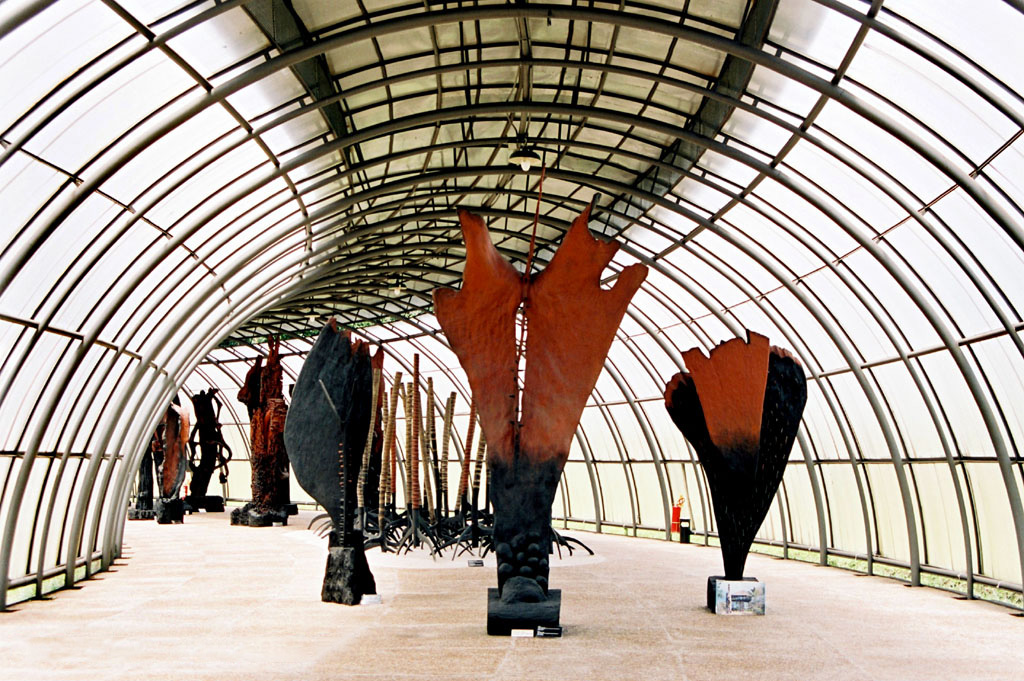
Sculptures by Franz Krajcberg

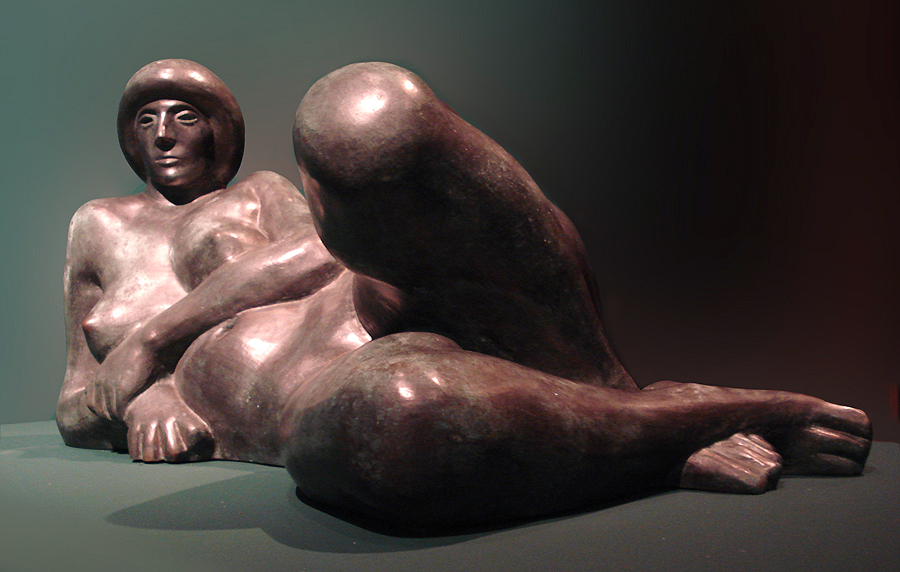
Vasco Prado: Model resting, 1999. Rio Grande do Sul Museum of Art
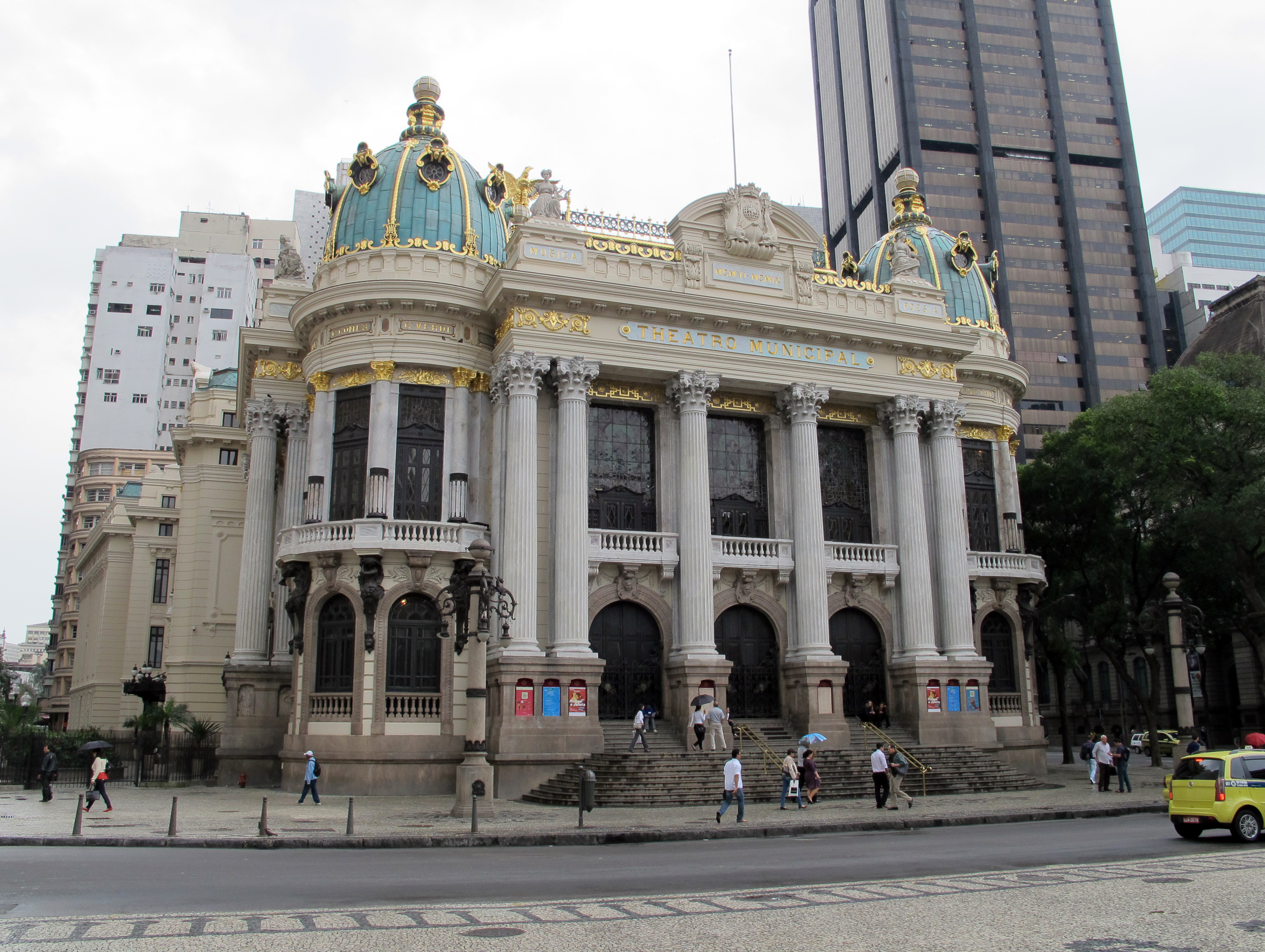
Theatro Municipal, Rio de Janeiro. Eclectic

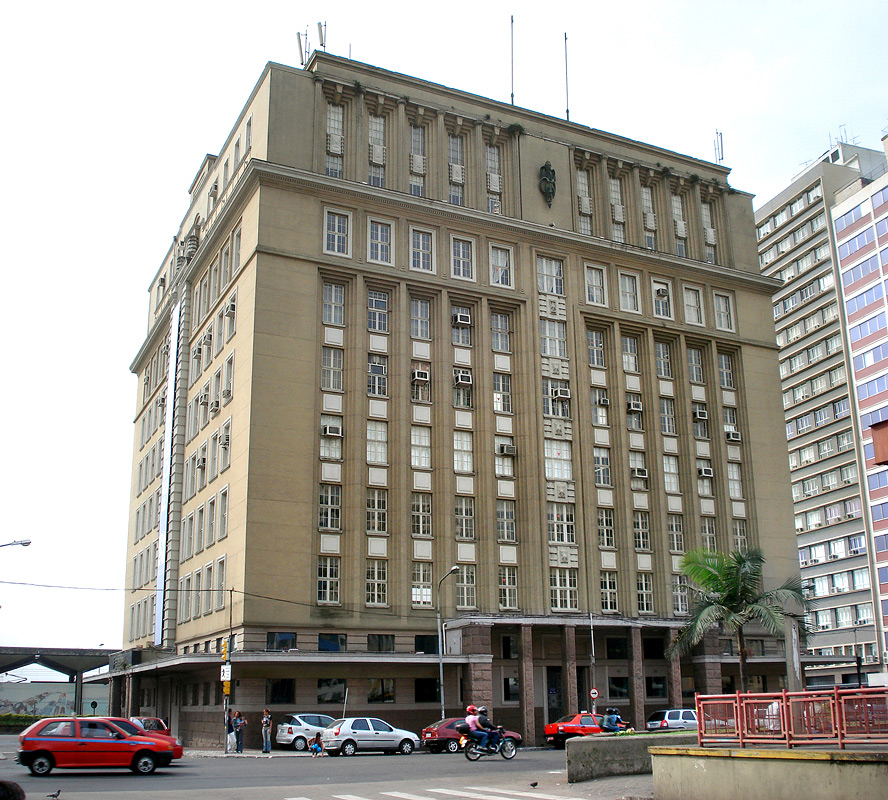
Joseph Franz Seraph Lutzenberger: Palácio do Comércio, Porto Alegre. Déco

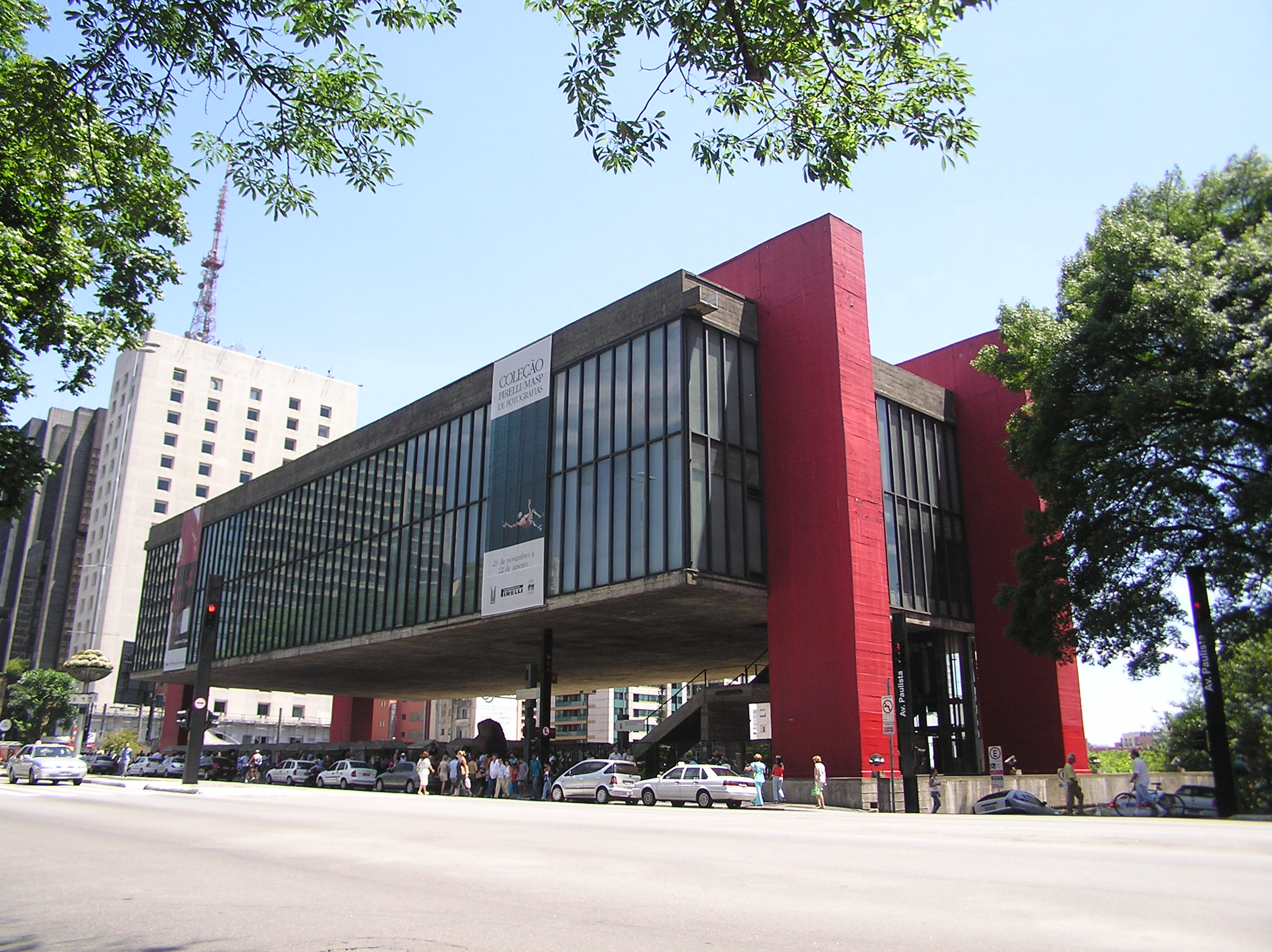
Lina Bo Bardi: São Paulo Museum of Art. Modern

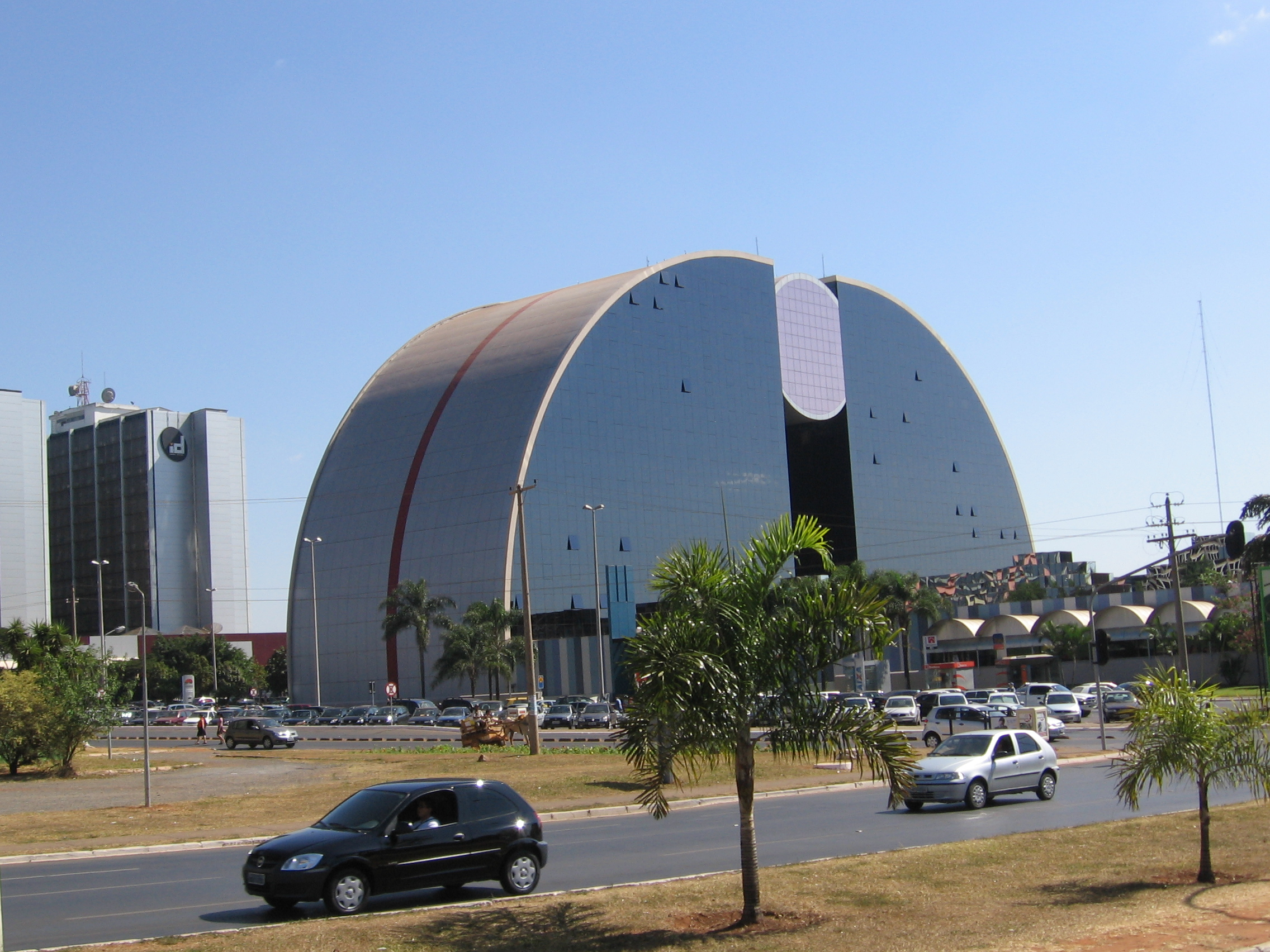
Ruy Ohtake: Brasilia Shopping. Contemporary

== See also ==
- Latin American art
- Brazilian painting
- Brazilian sculpture
- Brazilian literature
- Brazilian architecture
- Brazilian music
- Brazilian photography
