= Periperi =

- Interactive map of Periperi
- Country: Brazil
- Region: Northeast
- State: Bahia
- Time zone: UTC-3

Periperi is a subdistrict north of Salvador, in the Brazilian State of Bahia.

== Culture ==
For some, Periperi is viewed as the cultural core of the many suburbs surrounding Salvador. It has one of the largest venues in the Salvador area, the Sport Club of Periperi. On Sundays, locals enjoy pagodes (samba dances), serestas (seniors' balls), informal drumming sessions on the beach, and the Black Bahia funk dance. The Black Bahia dance started in the early 1980s and, from 1981 to 1996, was held every Sunday except during Carnival. In comparison to pagode or samba dancers, Black Bahia dancers have positive reputations. Whereas samba enthusiasts often become violent and uncivil, Black Bahia dancers are courteous and polite.

The dichotomy between these two groups exemplifies the many characteristics of Bahia. Within the various subcultures in PeriPeri, popular music styles, clothing styles and dance styles differ drastically. The youth in the area can choose which type of lifestyle fits them. Cultural diffusion within the region has allowed the music styles to converge, change and diverge. Periperi's location in relation to Salvador allows people who live outside of the city center to participate in an urban-like social environment.

Estudio Periferia is located in Periperi, and is the only recording studio available to bands who are not in the charts. Periperi is also the home of the bloco afro group Ara Ketu (people of Ketu), which originated there in 1980. The Afro Blocos feature a wide array of instruments, and samba-reggae rhythms. They are generally socially active groups, and give back to the local community. Many are exclusively black, but Ara Ketu claims to be the first group to have opened itself to people of all classes, ethnicities and religions.

It is important to many bloco afro groups to distinguish themselves from the Afro-Bahian culture, and thereby avoid the Bahian mass media. Some groups, such as the group Ile Aiye, do this through cultural inspiration from the U.S. black music scene. Ile Aiye incorporates manipulated and reinterepeted sound recordings from black U.S. artists. Additionally, their fashion style is heavily influenced by black U.S. artists. Other blocos afro, such as Olodum, express themselves with more traditional music that focuses on their African heritage. Generally, young Brazilian funk enthusiasts prefer the former groups and their associations with blackness and modernity. These groups make Periperi very central to the Brazilian funk scene.
