= Margarethe Hormuth-Kallmorgen =

German painter (1857–1916)

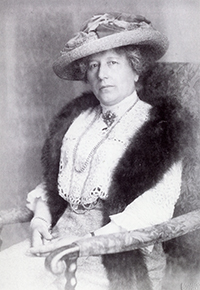
- Margarethe Hormuth-Kallmorgen, 1913
- Born: Margarethe Anna Maria Sophie Hormuth; 22 August 1857; Heidelberg, Grand Duchy of Baden
- Died: 7 July 1916 (aged 58); Heidelberg, Germany
- Known for: Painting
- Movement: Wilhelmine Period
- Spouse: Friedrich Kallmorgen (m. 1882)

Margarethe Hormuth-Kallmorgen (22 August 1857–7 July 1916) was a German painter. She was known for her flower painting.

== Biography ==
Hormuth was born on 22 August 1857 in Heidelberg. She studied painting with Ferdinand Keller.

in 1882 she married the landscape painter Friedrich Kallmorgen with whom she had two children. The couple belonged to the Grötzinger Art Colony.

Hormuth-Kallmorgen exhibited her work at the Palace of Fine Arts and The Woman's Building at the 1893 World's Columbian Exposition in Chicago, Illinois.

In 1898 she became a board member of the Karlsruher Malerinnen-Vereins. In the early 1900s she taught flower painting In 1902 her husband accepted a position at the Berlin University of the Arts and they moved to Berlin. Hormuth-Kallmorgen painted infrequently after the move.

Hormuth-Kallmorgen died on 7 July 1916 in Heidelberg

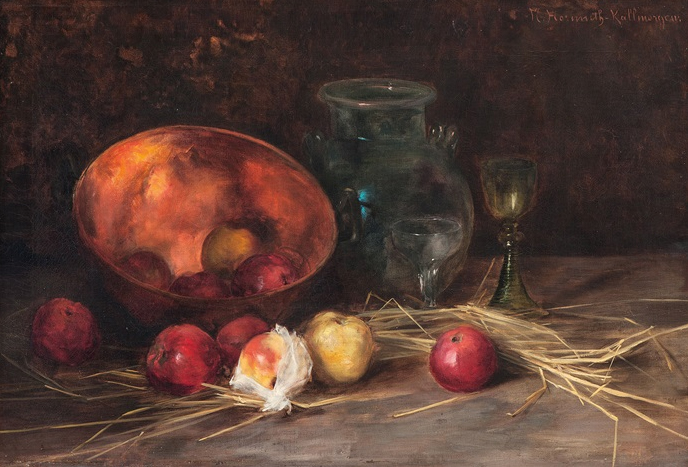
Stillleben mit Äpfeln

== Legacy ==
In 1975 Grötzingen designated the Margarethe Hormuth Street in the Karlsruhe's district.
