= Ernst Hildebrand =

German painter

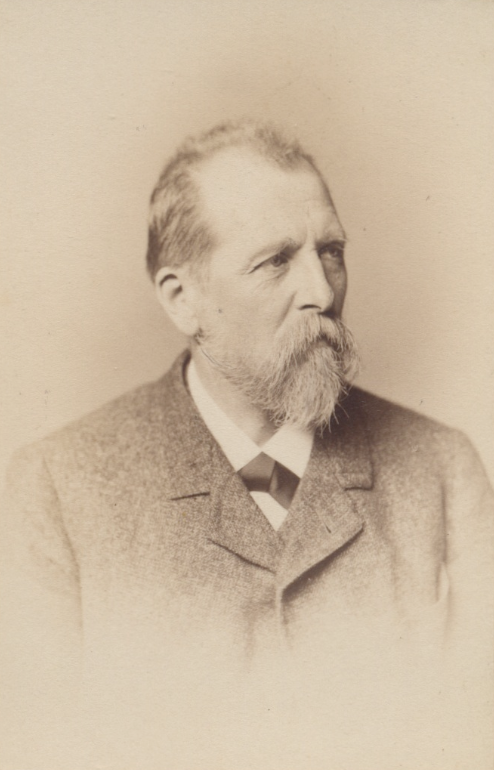
Ernst Hildebrand (1887), photograph by Löscher & Petsch

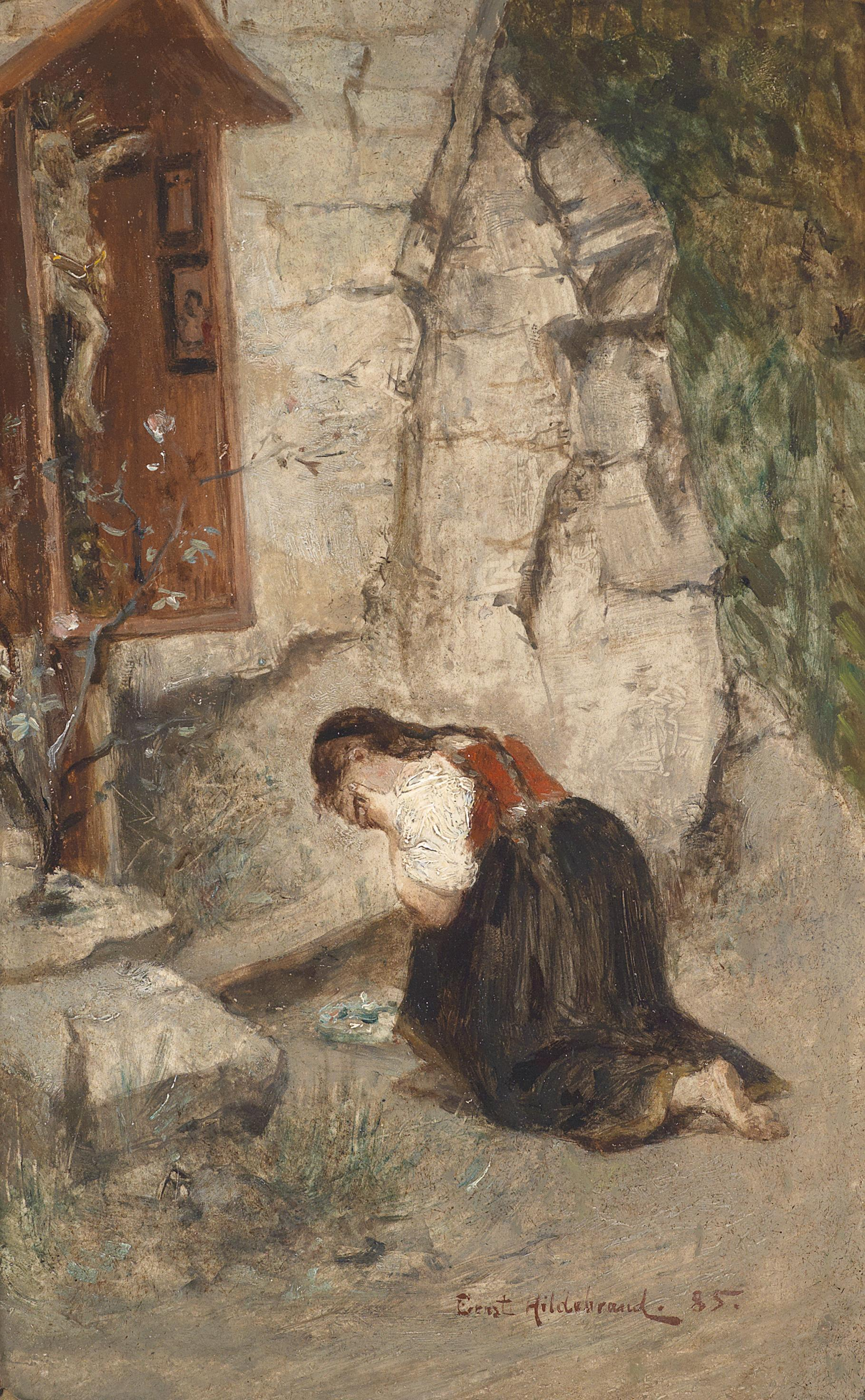
Despair (1885)

Ernst Wilhelm Hildebrand (8 March 1833 – 17 November 1924) was a German painter. Many art websites mistakenly identify him as "Swiss".

== Biography ==
He was born in Falkenberg, Heideblick, as the son of a landowner who later became the station master of Sorau. His first art lessons came from Carl Steffeck in Berlin where, after a year spent on a study trip to Paris, he would decide to live. In 1875, he became a Professor at the Academy of Fine Arts, Karlsruhe and, the following year, was appointed Professor of figure painting. Later, he also taught genre, history and portrait painting. His notable students there included Carl Röchling, Friedrich Kallmorgen and Pedro Weingärtner.

In 1880, at the suggestion of Anton von Werner, he was appointed to succeed Karl Gussow at the Prussian Academy of Arts. However, in 1885 he gave up teaching for health reasons. He remained a member of the academy and was elected to several terms on the academic Senate.

Initially, he focused on decorative painting, but soon turned to genre scenes, featuring Martin Luther and Queen Louise. In the 1890s, he once again switched styles, this time to portrait painting.

He also made himself welcome at court, where he produced canvases of the Grand Duke and Duchess of Baden and the Crown Prince (later Emperor) Frederick III. He also painted several portraits of University professors (including Arthur Auwers and Karl Möbius). Later, he ventured into painting scenes from history (Tullia Minor driving her team of horses over her father's corpse) and literature (such as Gretchen in Prison, a scene from Goethe's Faust).

His brother Max Hildebrand, was an engineer and inventor who made several improvements to geodetic and astronomical instruments.

Hildebrand died in 1924 in Berlin.
