= Pedro Weingärtner =

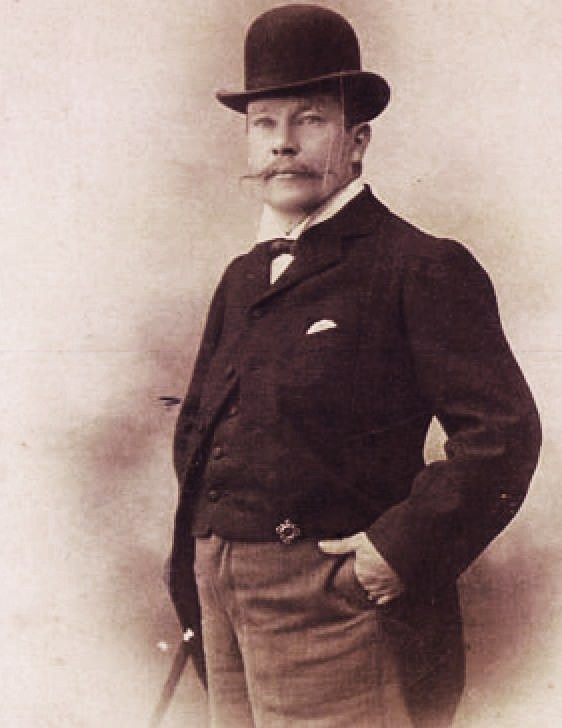
Pedro Weingärtner (1890s)

Pedro Weingärtner (26 July 1853 – 26 December 1929) was an Academic painter of Brazil, and the first artist born in Rio Grande do Sul to win international praise for his work.

He is the Patron of the 45th chair of the Brazilian Academy of Fine Arts.

== Biography ==
Born in Porto Alegre, to a family of German immigrants, he began his artistic career as an amateur, helped by his brother Inácio, who was a lithographer, and possibly also by the painter Delfim da Câmara. In 1878 he moved to Germany in order to study in the Grossherzoglich Badische Kunstschule, in Karlsruhe. There he became a pupil of Ferdinand Keller, Theodor Poeckh and Ernst Hildebrand. In 1880 Keller moved to Berlin, being followed by Weingärtner, who then enrolled in the local Academy.

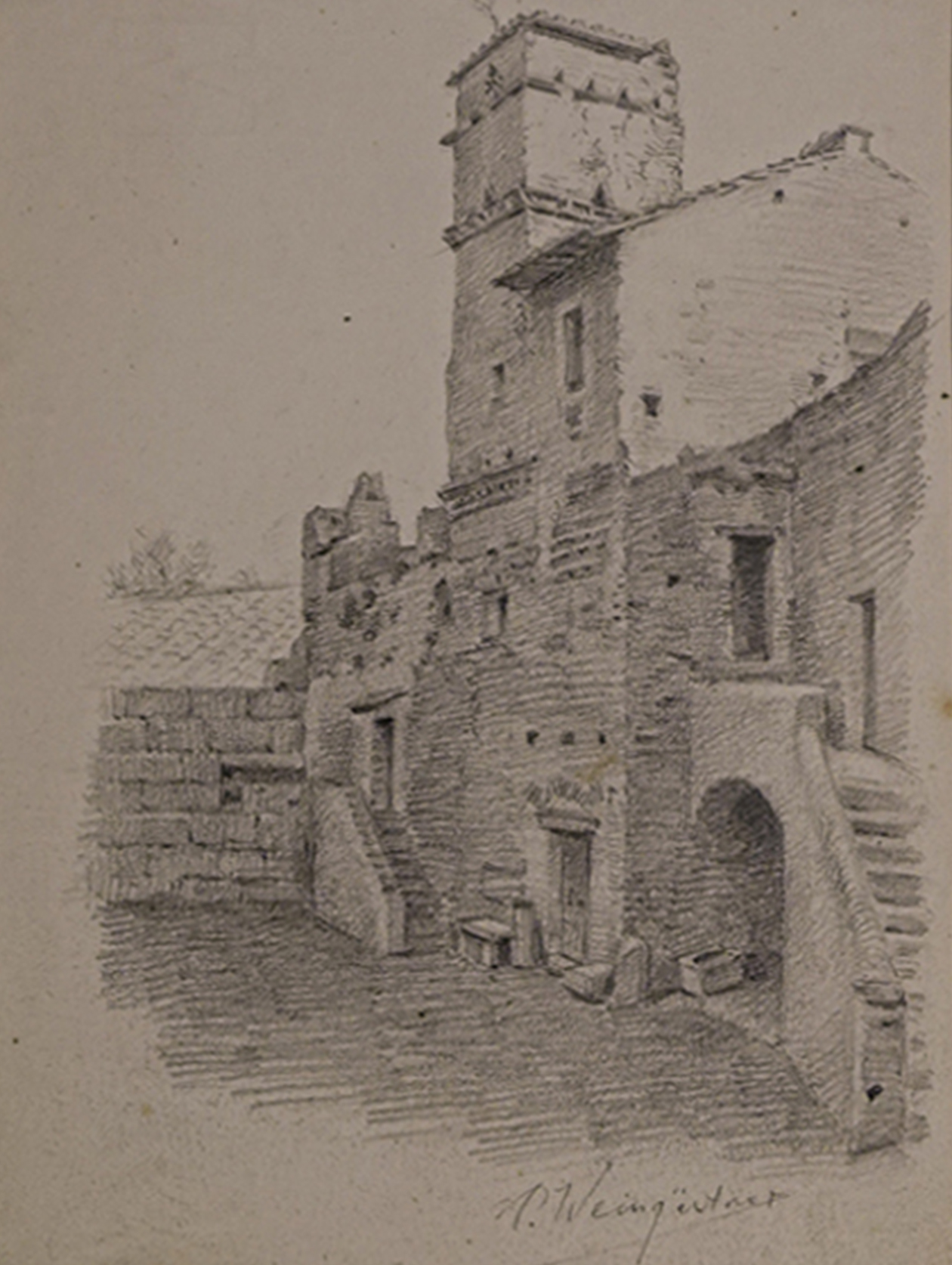
Pencil study of a castle, 1926. Private collection.

In 1882 he left Germany for France, studying in the Académie Julian under Tony Robert-Fleury and William-Adolphe Bouguereau. Wrecked by financial issues, he thought of abandoning his studies, but such situation was reverted by supportive friends, including Baron of Itajubá, who got for him a special scholarship from Emperor Pedro II upon Bouguereau's advice. Then he could further his education in Rome.

Thereafter for many years he divided his time between Rio de Janeiro, Porto Alegre and Rome, traveling very often and being celebrated as one of the most important Brazilian painters of his generation. In Rio Grande do Sul he was a star. In 1920 he was back in Porto Alegre, where the remained until death. His fame declined from 1925 on, facing competition from new painters and changing tastes in local art.

He devoted all his efforts to a half-Realist half-Romantic approach to Academicism even while such styles were already being severely challenged by Modern tendencies. Major themes in his work were mythological scenes, landscapes and genre paintings focusing mainly immigrants and the gaucho, the folk type of Rio Grande do Sul people.

== Selected paintings ==
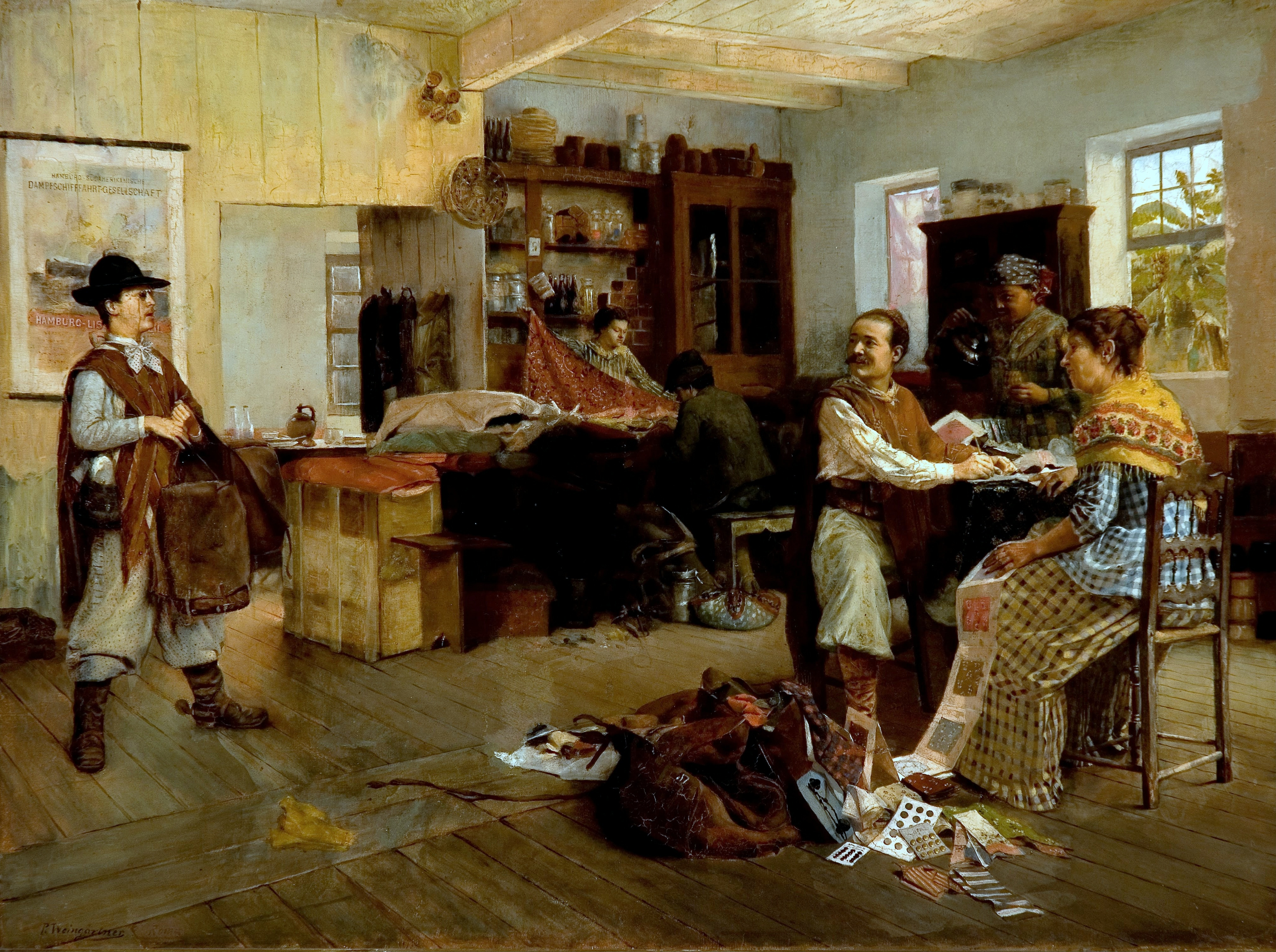
Too late! Museu Nacional de Belas Artes

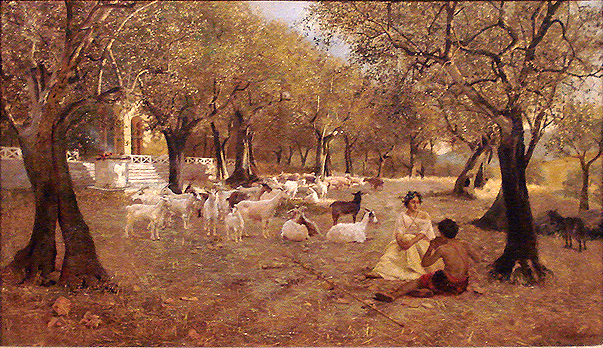
Daphnis and Chloe. Rio Grande do Sul Museum of Art

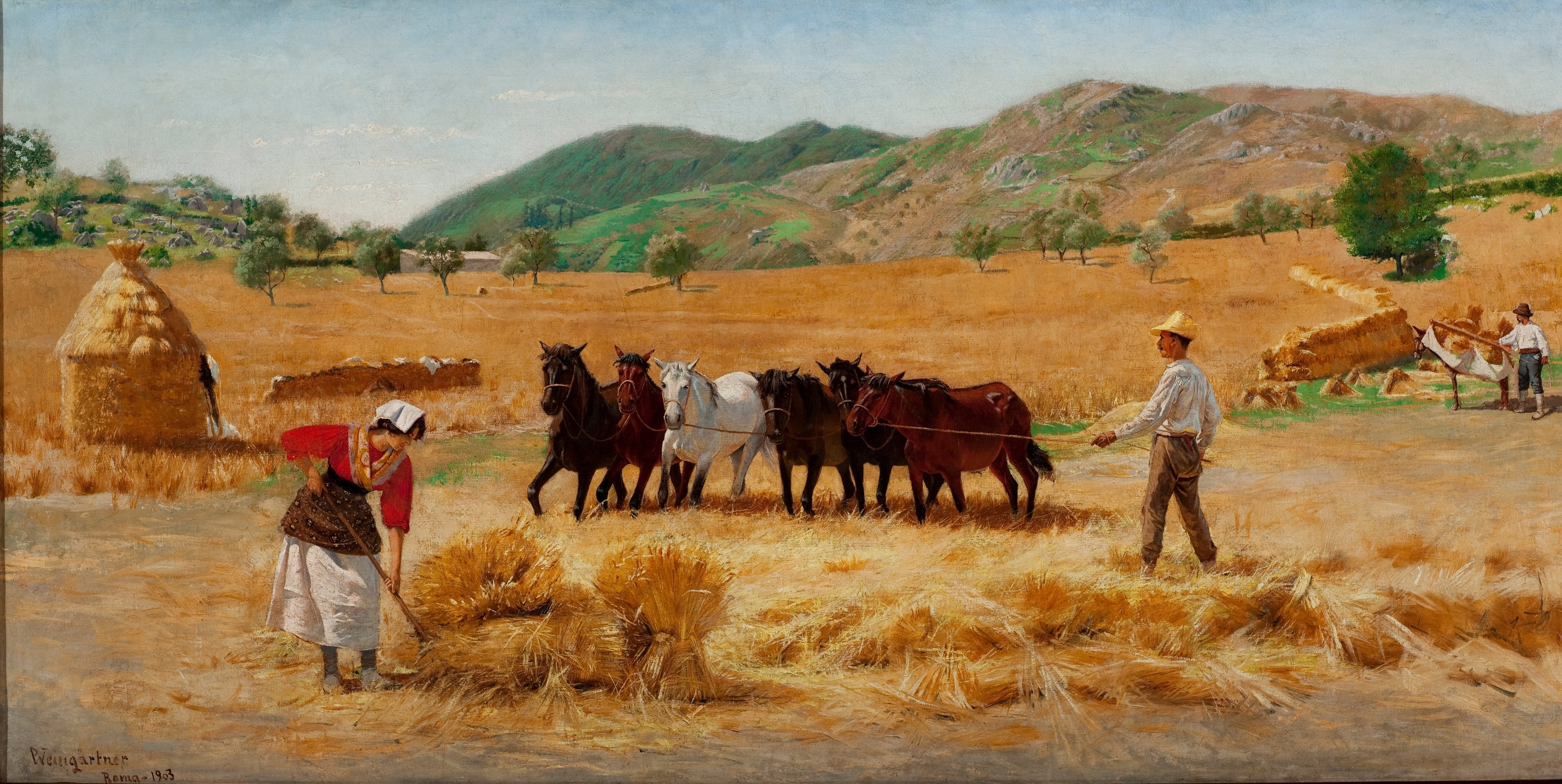
Harvest in Anticoli, 1903. Pinacoteca do Estado de São Paulo

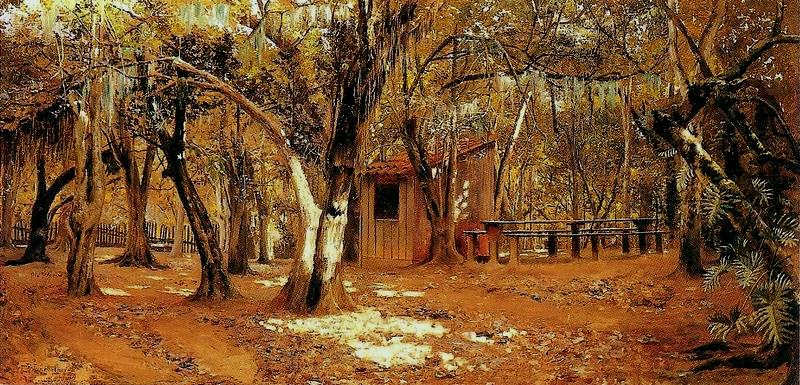
Landscape, 1900. Pinacoteca do Estado de São Paulo

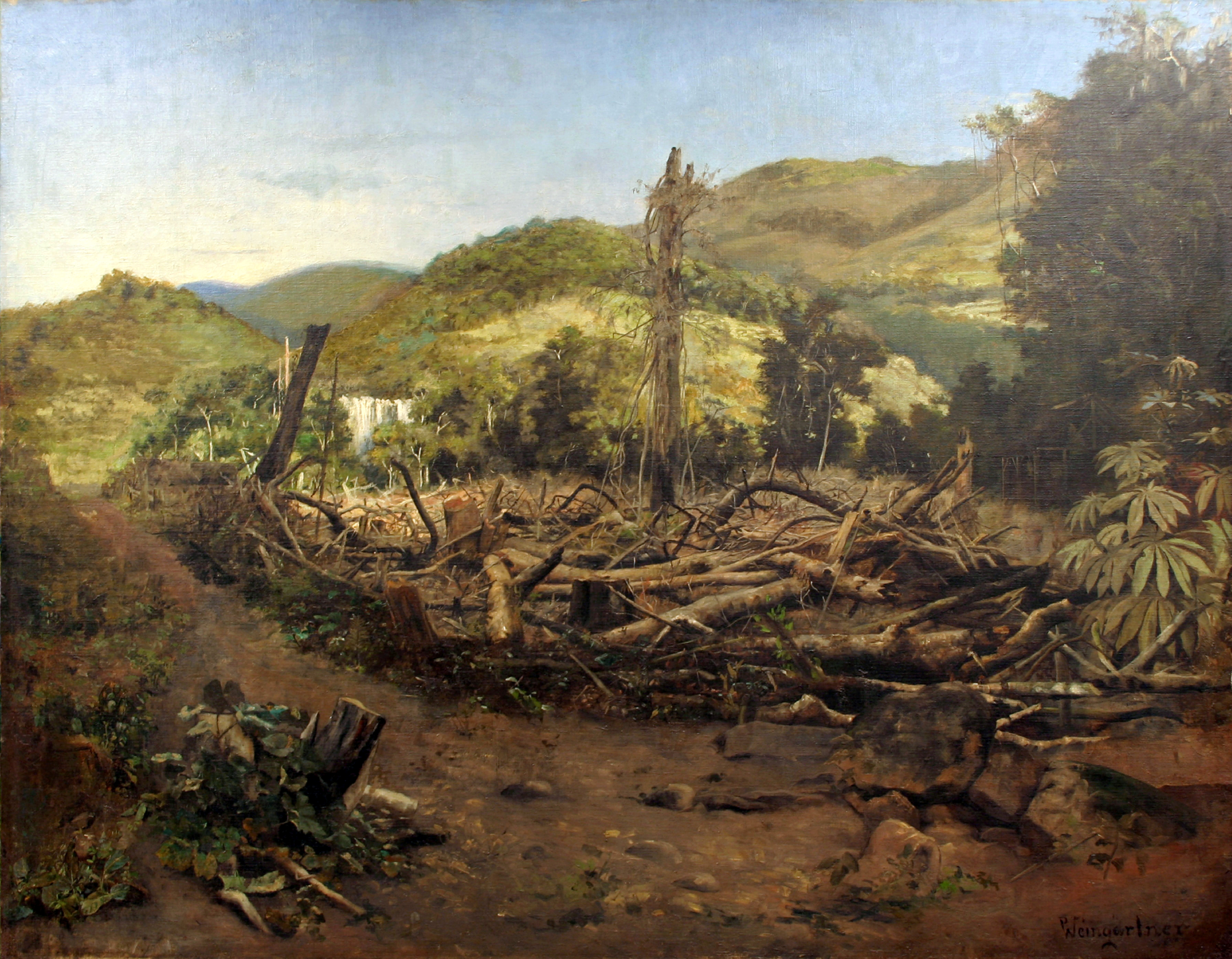
Felled Trees, 1913. Museu Nacional de Belas Artes

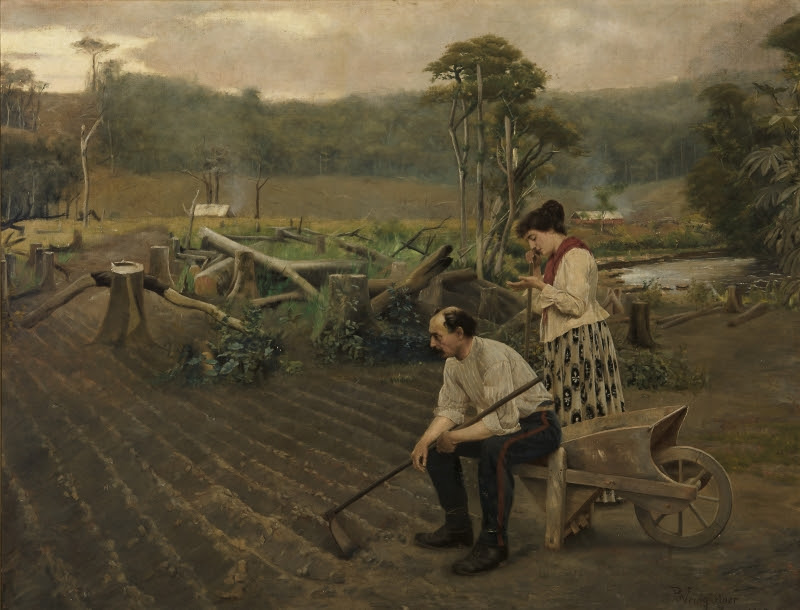
Tempora mutantur, 1898. Rio Grande do Sul Museum of Art

== See also ==
- Brazilian painting
- Academicism
- Realism
- Romanticism
- Painting in Rio Grande do Sul
