= Max Hildebrand =

German mechanic and entrepreneur

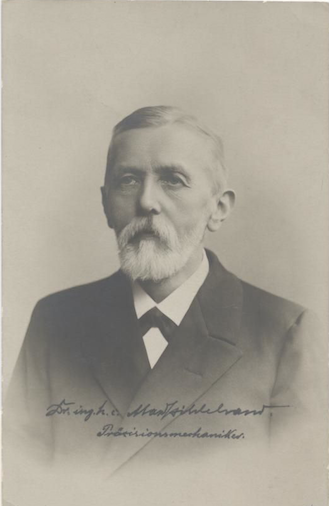
Max Hildebrand (1910)

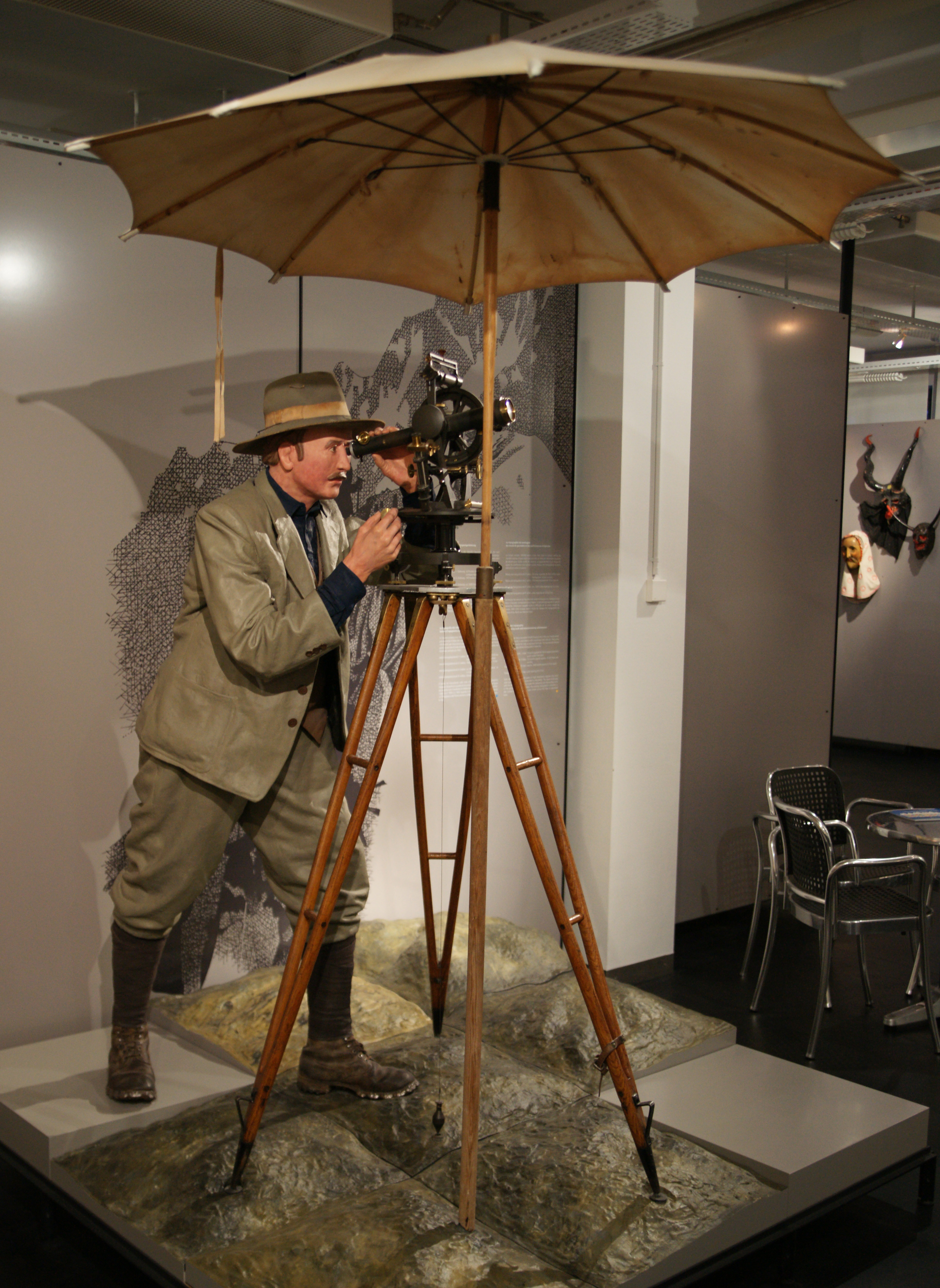
Surveyor with a Hildebrand theodolite; Swiss Alpine Museum

Max Hildebrand (23 December 1839, Heideblick - 26 June 1910, Freiberg) was a German mechanic and entrepreneur. His work helped to improve geodetic devices and the machines used to make them.

== Biography ==
His father, Karl, was the station master in Sorau. During his years in primary and secondary school there, he was already involved in technical projects at the railway workshop. After an accident that shattered one of his legs, he was sent to a gymnasium in Frankfurt an der Oder.

After starting an apprenticeship as a watchmaker, he switched to being a mechanic and worked in Berlin. There, he designed and made his own shuttle sewing machine and lathe. After completing that apprenticeship, he was employed as a precision mechanic for "Pistor & Martins", a company that made surveying and measuring tools. Later, he worked for them in Paris and represented the company at the Exposition Universelle (1867).

The following year, he joined an expedition to Siam to observe a solar eclipse. After gaining more professional experience in England, he returned to Berlin and set up his own workshop. There, he did work for the Berlin Observatory, the Imperial Standard Calibration Commission and the German General Staff.

In 1873, he moved to Freiberg, where he became a partner in the precision engineering workshop, "August Lingke & Compagnie", which would later become "Hildebrand & Schramm". He also took part in the discussions between the Generals Helmuth von Moltke and Otto von Morozowicz with the Director of the observatory, Wilhelm Foerster; talks which would lead to the establishment of the Physikalisch-Technische Bundesanstalt. In 1895, he was appointed a member of that organization's Board of Trustees.

He was especially interested in equipment for mine surveying. In 1876, he developed a device for setting up a theodolite and target signs underground. He also devised a way to make optical plumb bobs. From 1883 to 1892, his workshop introduced improvements to levels, compasses and theodolites.

In 1909, the Freiberg University of Mining and Technology and the Technische Universität Dresden joined to present him with an honorary Doktoringenieur degree.

His brother was the painter, Ernst Hildebrand. He was married to Maria Ockel (1842–1908). Their daughter, Charlotte (1880–1953), married the Bergbeamter (mining official) Karl Spitzner.

== Sources ==
- Fischer, Walther (1972). "Hildebrand, Max". Neue Deutsche Biographie (in German). Vol. 9. Berlin: Duncker & Humblot. pp. 123–123. (full text online).
- Excerpt from Geschichte der Geodäsie in Deutschland by Wolfgang Torge @ Google Books
