= Campaign streamer =

Streamers showing someone participated in a particular battle

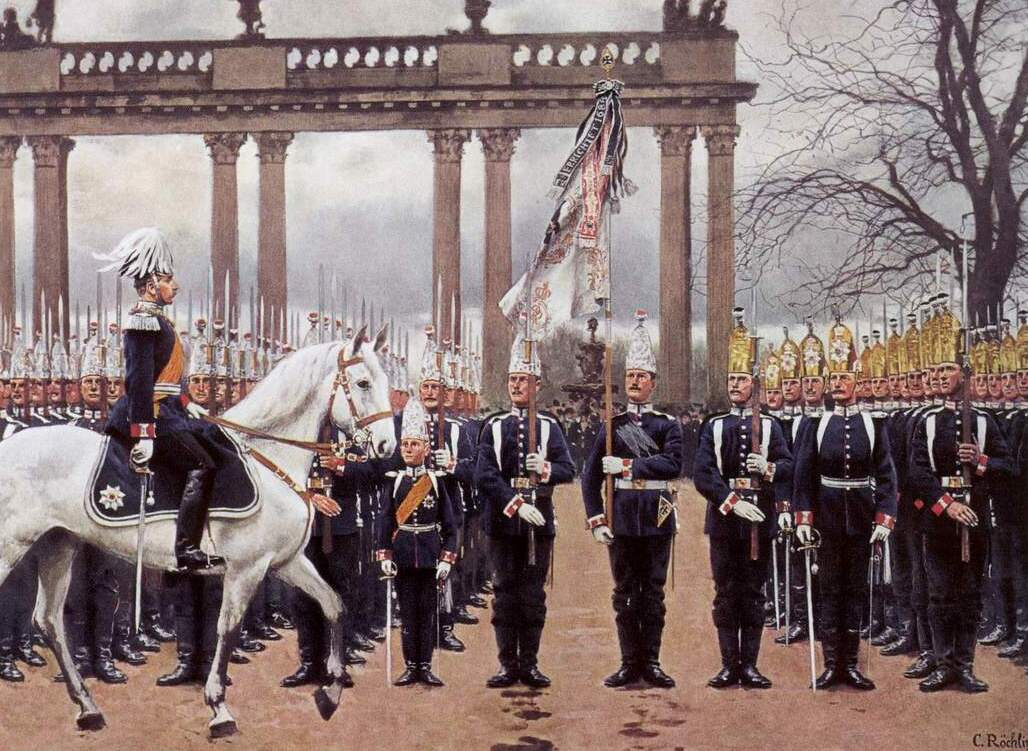
Parade in Lustgarten 9 February 1894 by Carl Röchling; ribbons can be seen attached to the flag in the center.

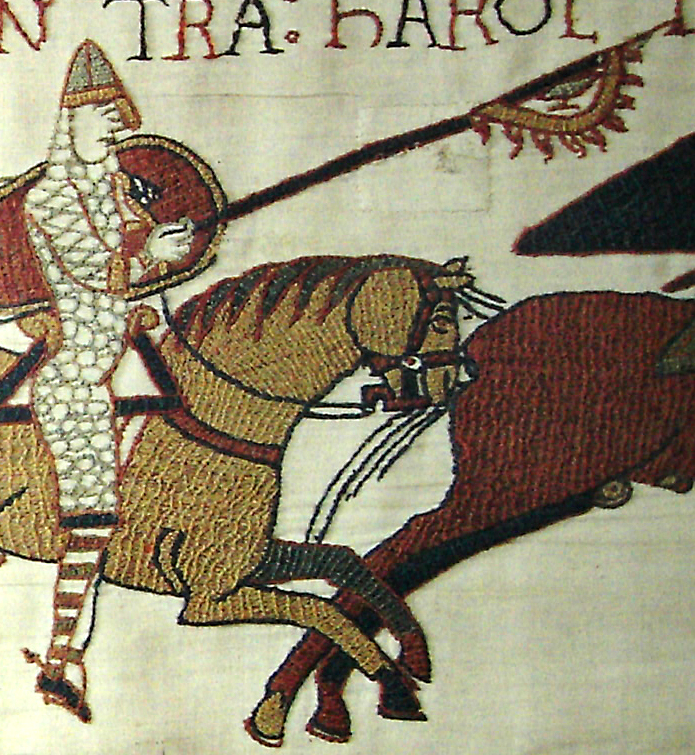
The war streamer (guþfana genumen), also cited in the Anglo-Saxon Chronicle and nowadays known as raven banner, which appears on the Bayeux Tapestry.

Campaign streamers are decorations attached to military flags to recognize particular achievements or events of a military unit or service. Attached to the headpiece of the assigned flag, the streamer often is an inscribed ribbon with the name and date denoting participation in a particular battle, military campaign, or theater of war; the ribbon's colors are chosen accordingly and frequently match an associated campaign medal or ribbon bar. They often are physical manifestations of battle honours, though this does not mean all streamers are battle honours (for example, gala or parade streamers not connected to a battle). They should not be confused with a tassel, which is usually purely decorative in nature.

The armed forces of Germany, the United States and others have engaged in awarding streamers. Historically Prussia, Austria-Hungary and the Soviet Union have also used streamers in this manner.

== United States ==
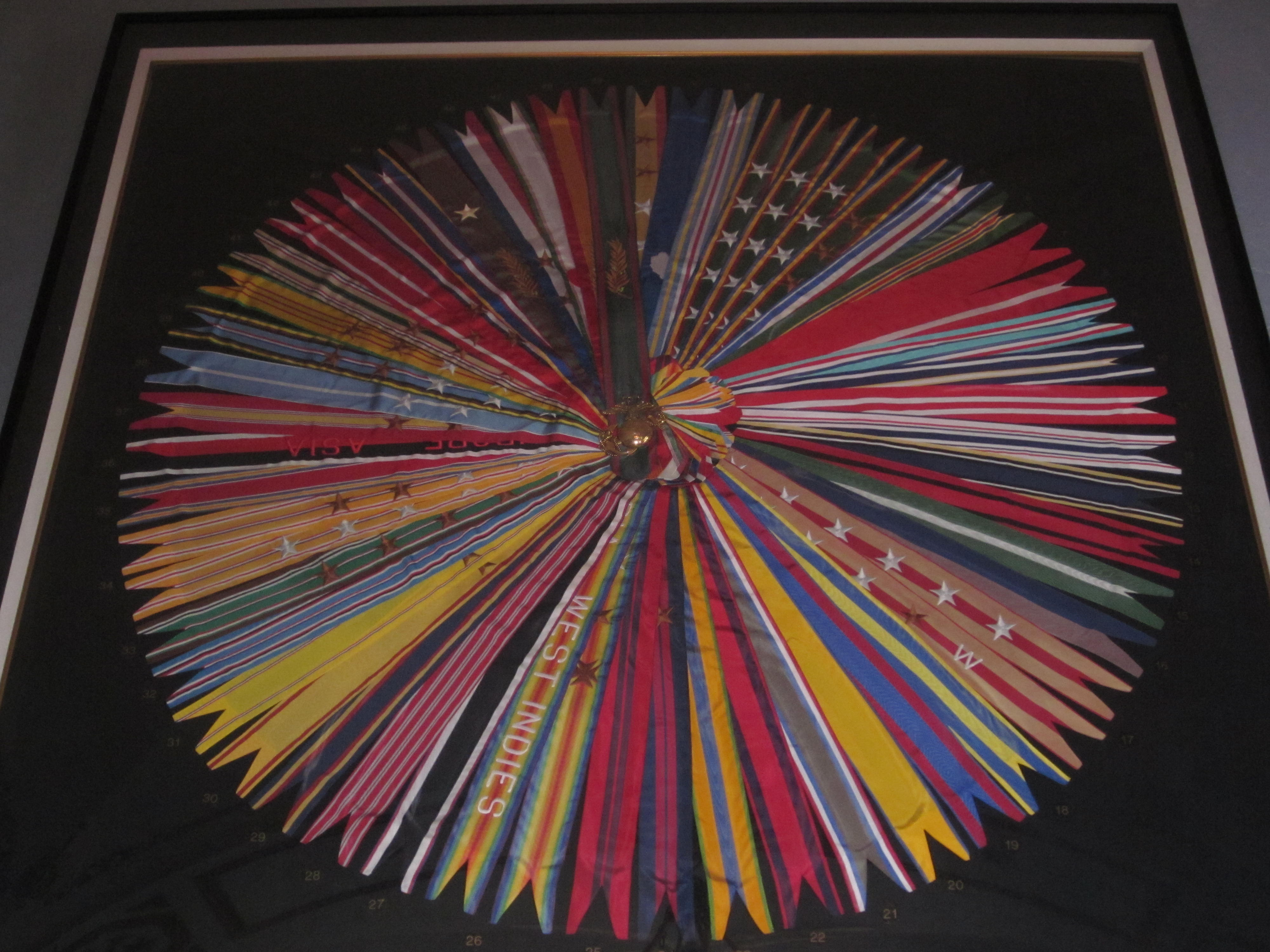
Display of streamers from the flag of the United States Marine Corps

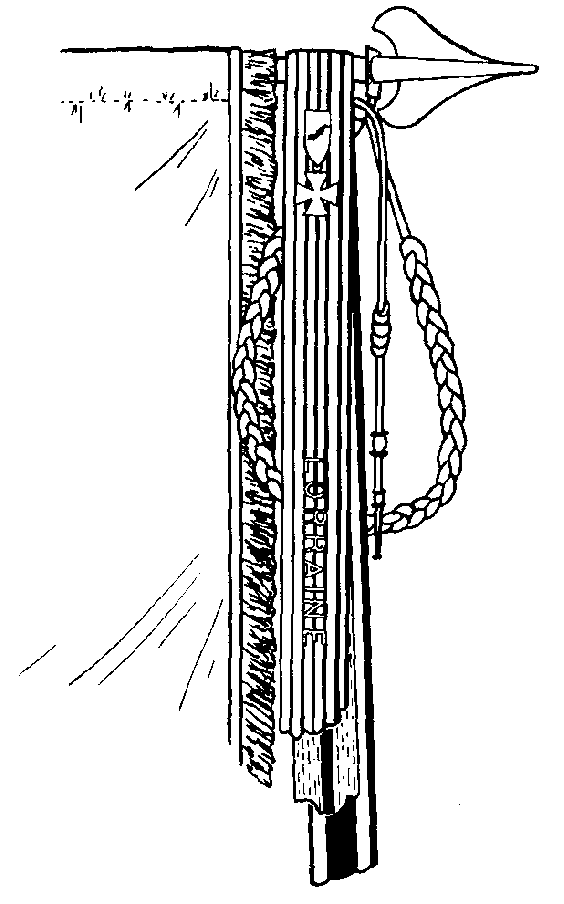
Display of Streamers on US Army Flags, Colors and Guidons

=== Background ===
The United States Army established campaign streamers in 1920, the United States Marine Corps in 1939, the United States Air Force in 1956. The United States Coast Guard adopted battle streamers in 1968, with the United States Navy following suit in 1971.

=== Usage ===
Many of the practices relative to streamers and their display are similar among the services. There are, however, differences, particularly regarding the number of streamers and use of embroidered devices. The Army carries a separate streamer for each important action in all wars in which that service has participated, each embroidered with the name of the action commemorated. Currently, the Army allows 190 streamers, and the Air Force, employing the Army system, carries more than 60. Unlike the Army–Air Force practice, the Marines and Navy use one ribbon for each war, campaign, or theater of operations. Specific actions or battles are highlighted by bronze and silver stars embroidered on the ribbon. The Marine Corps has 57 streamers, the Navy 36, and the Coast Guard uses 43, unadorned by either stars or lettering. Stars on the Marines and Navy streamers follow the practice initiated during the World War II period for ribbons and medals—that is, a bronze service star for each action, and a silver star in lieu of five bronze stars. The Navy applies stars to appropriate ribbons throughout its history, whereas the Marine Corps uses stars to commemorate service starting from 1900. The Navy's Presidential Unit Citation, Navy Unit Commendation, and Meritorious Unit Commendation streamers each carry a red number rather than stars, representing the number of times that the respective award has been conferred upon Navy units.

=== Appearance ===
Streamers tend to have a flat end, with writing, with the sole exception being those of the USMC, whose streamers usually have a pointed end with no writing. The fly end of the streamer usually has a swallowtail.

==== Size ====
Streamers' sizes vary based upon the military branch that uses them and the size of the flag that they are attached to. Generally they are 3 feet (0.91 m) long and 2.75 inches (7.0 cm) wide; the USMC's streamers are 2.75 inches (7.0 cm) wide and either 36 inches (3.0 ft) or 48 inches (4.0 ft) long.

==== Colors ====
Where a medal has been awarded for a particular war or service, the coloring and design of the streamer are the same as the ribbon from which the medal is suspended. Conflicts and operations for which no medal was issued have ribbons specially designed for use as streamers.

=== 2023 Decision Regarding Confederate Battle Honors ===
On 16 March 2023 US Southern States National Guard units that had Civil War Battle Honors (Confederate) were ordered to remove those battle streamers from their battalion flag staffs.

== See also ==
- Awards and decorations of the United States Armed Forces
- Campaign streamers of the American Revolutionary War

== External articles ==
- U.S. Army campaign streamers
- U.S. Navy campaign streamers
- U.S. Marine Corps campaign streamers
- U.S. Air Force campaign streamers
- U.S. Coast Guard campaign streamers
