= Friedrich Kallmorgen =

German painter

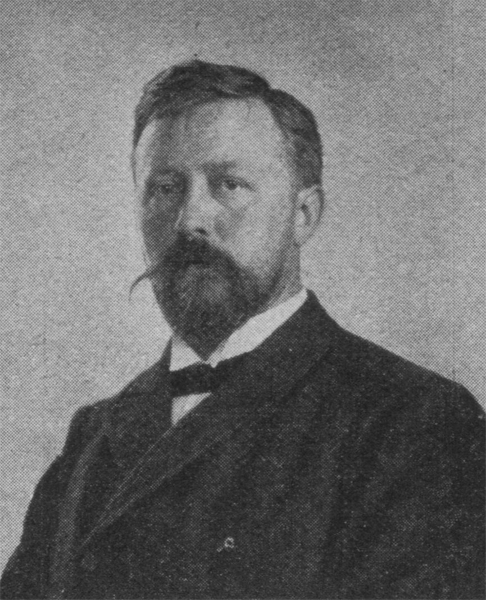
Friedrich Kallmorgen (before 1902)

Friedrich Kallmorgen (15 November 1856 – 2 June 1924) was a German Impressionist painter who specialized in landscapes and cityscapes.

== Biography ==
He was born in Hamburg. His father was an architect. From 1862 to 1863, he received his first drawing lessons from his uncle, the portrait and landscape painter Theodor Kuchel. In 1875, he enrolled at the Kunstakademie Düsseldorf, where he studied with Andreas Müller, Ernst Deger and Eugen Dücker. After a study trip to Franconian Switzerland, with Carl Friedrich Lessing, he attended the Academy of Fine Arts, Karlsruhe, where he was originally taught by Ernst Hildebrand, followed by Hans Fredrik Gude.

In the summer of 1878, he undertook painting expeditions to Lüneburg Heath and the Harz Mountains. In 1881, after a brief stay in Berlin, he returned to Karlsruhe and completed his studies with Gustav Schönleber.

Together with Schönleber and Hermann Baisch, he took trips to France, Belgium and Holland. Upon their return, he married the flower painter, Margarethe Hormuth. In 1889, he became one of the founders of the Grötzingen artists' colony. Two years later, Frederick I, Grand Duke of Baden named him a Professor. During the 1890s, he designed trading cards for the Stollwerck chocolate company of Cologne. His 1899 series on Italian folksongs was especially popular.

In 1901, he was appointed a teacher of landscape painting at the Berlin University of the Arts, succeeding Eugen Bracht. In 1908, he was awarded a gold medal at the "Große Berliner Kunstausstellung". He continued to travel widely, visiting Norway and Russia. After a brief residency in Heidelberg, he returned to the artists' colony near Karlsruhe and died there.

== Selected paintings ==
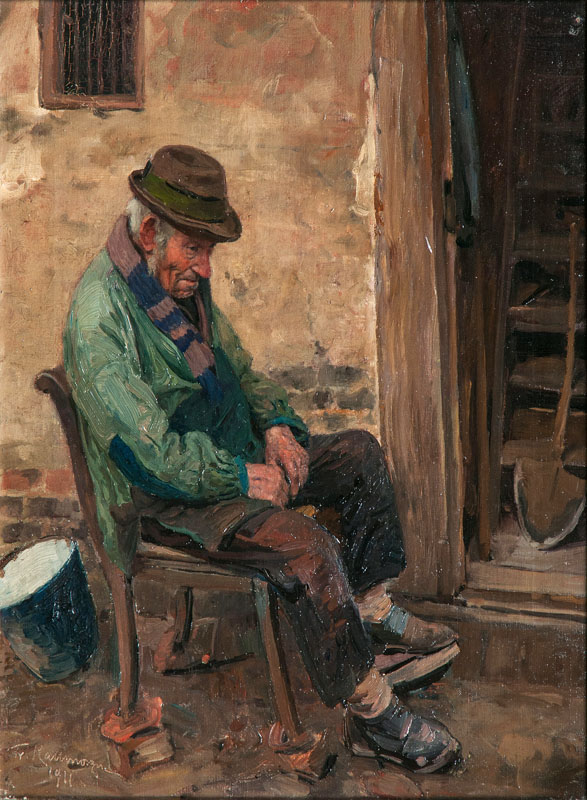
Mecklenburg Farmer

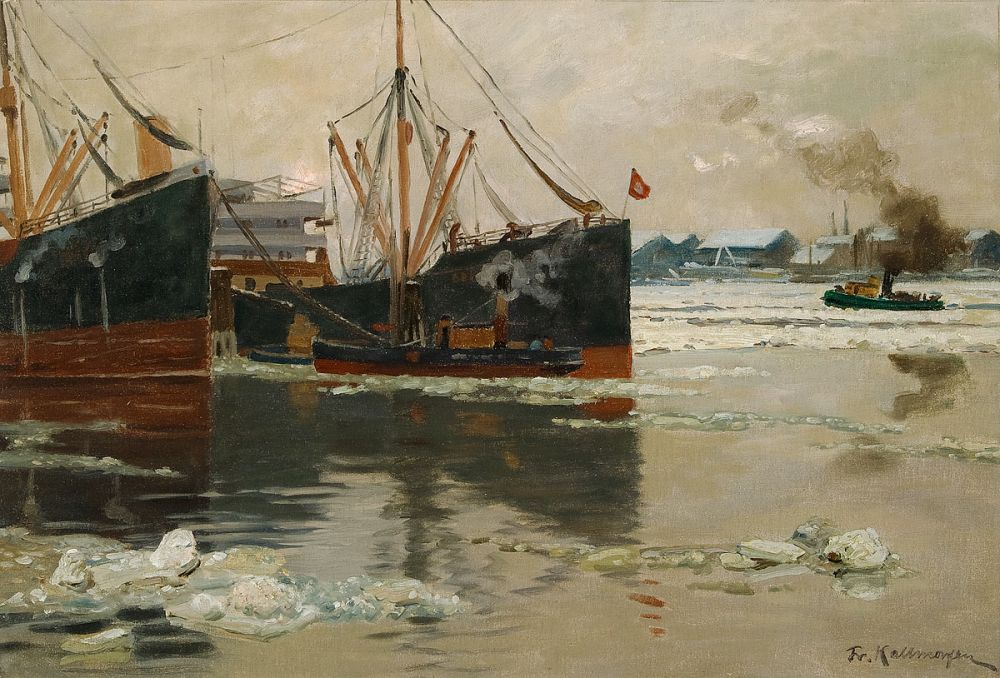
Cruising on the Elbe

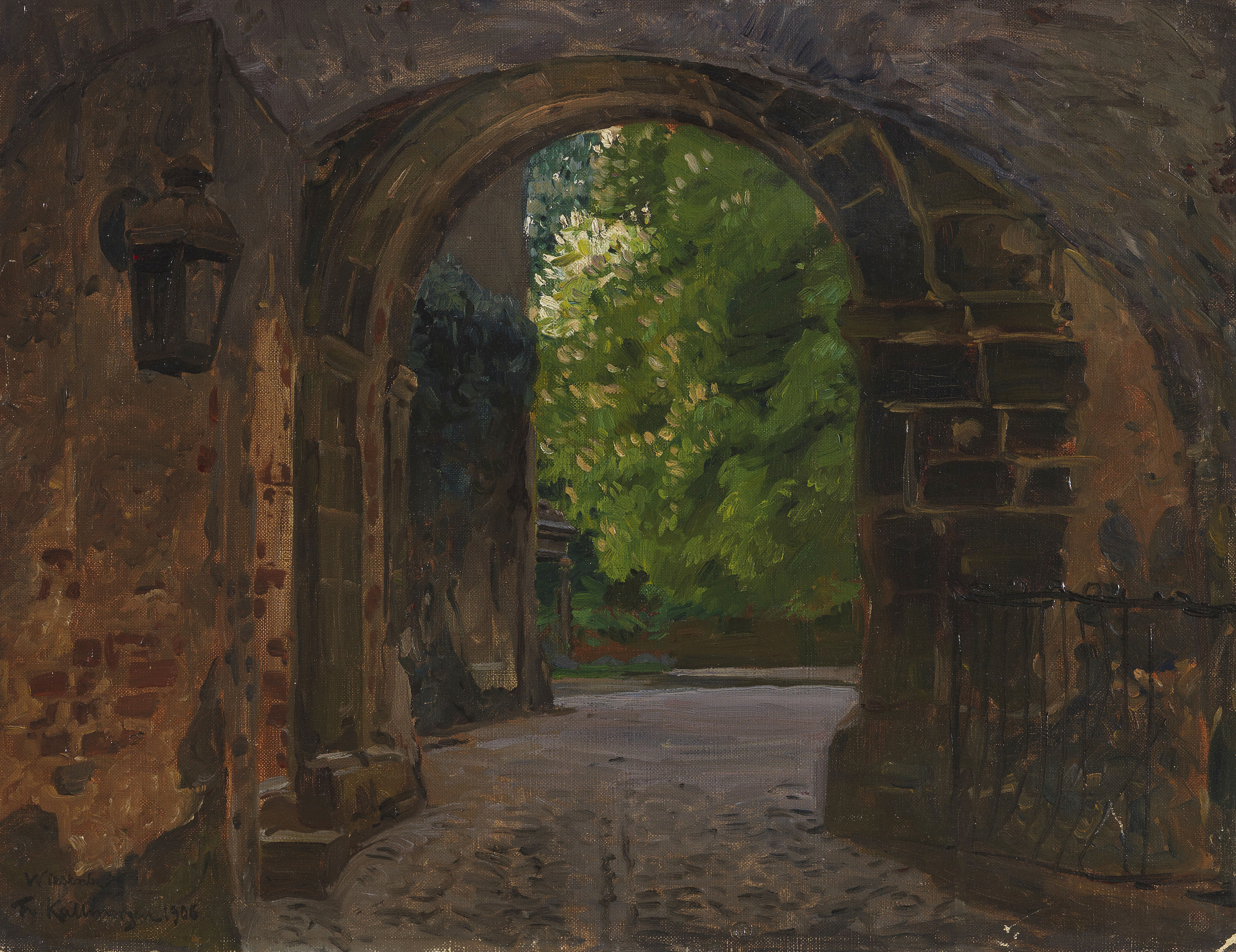
Castle Gate

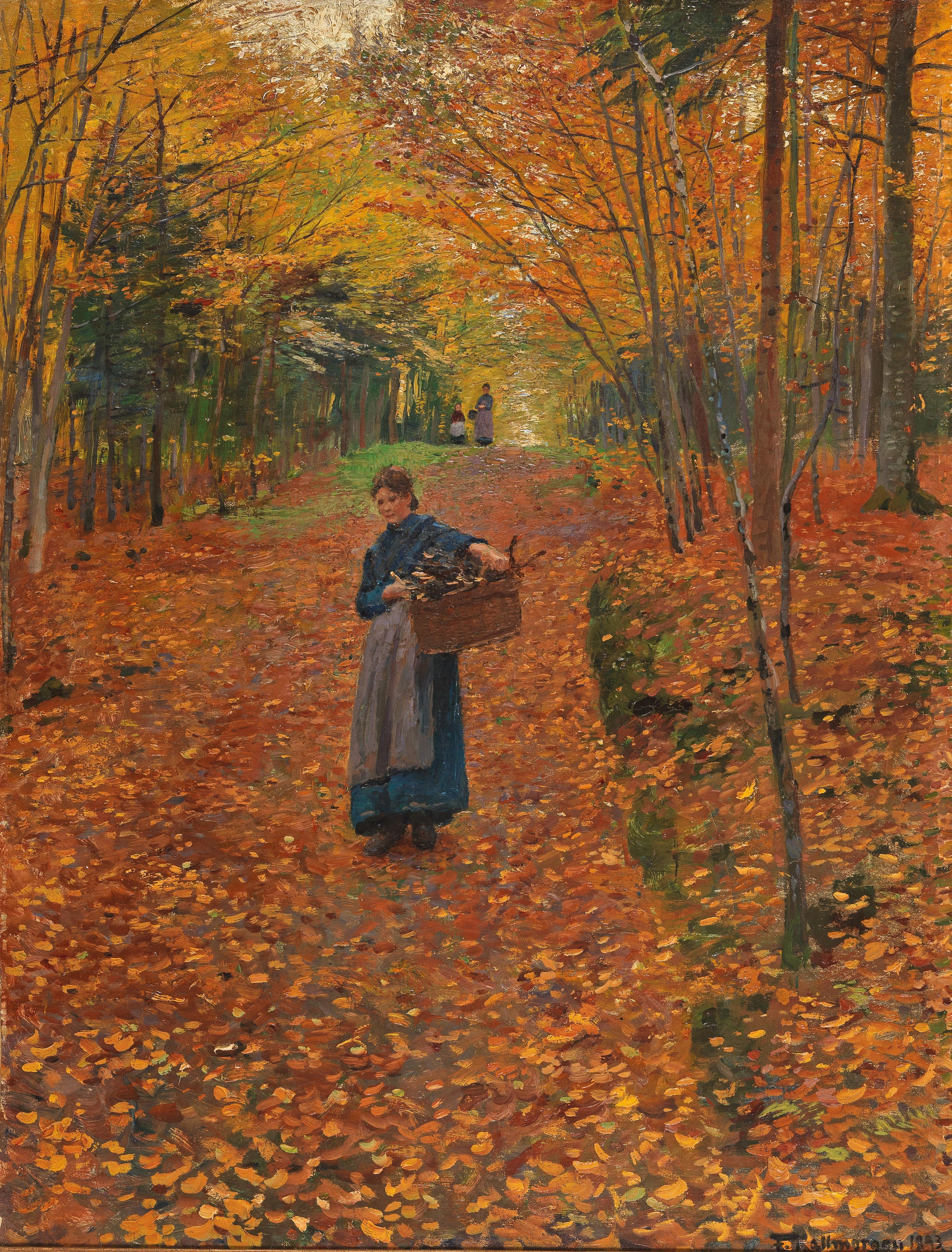
Wood Collector in an Autumn Forest
