= Campaign streamers of the American Revolutionary War =

Ribbons used by campaign participants

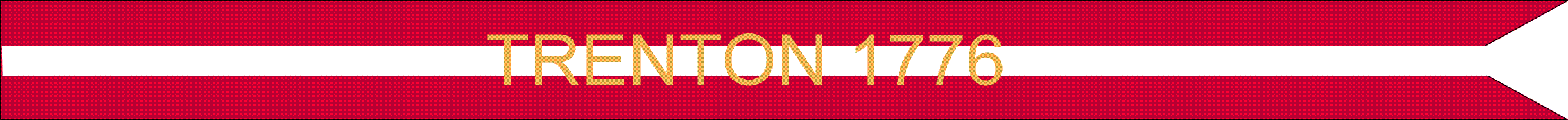
Trenton campaign streamer

Campaign streamers of the American Revolutionary War are a set of campaign streamers that military units participating in designated actions are allowed to display. The basic American Revolutionary War streamer is scarlet with a white center stripe, and a golden yellow inscription identifying the action. Scarlet is the color of the mother country (i.e. Great Britain) and the white stripe symbolizes the virgin land of the new country separated from its former sovereign by force of arms.

== Campaigns ==
Participation in the following 16 actions in the American Revolutionary War qualifies a military unit's standard to include a campaign streamer with the given designation:

- Lexington: The Battles of Lexington and Concord on April 19, 1775
- Ticonderoga: The Capture of Fort Ticonderoga on May 10, 1775
- Boston: The Siege of Boston, from April 19, 1775, to March 17, 1776
- Quebec: The Invasion of Quebec, from August 28, 1775, to July 1776
- Charleston: The Battle of Sullivan's Island (near Charleston, South Carolina) on June 28, 1776
- Long Island: The Battle of Long Island on August 27, 1776
- Trenton: The Battle of Trenton on December 26, 1776
- Princeton: The Battle of Princeton on January 3, 1777
- Saratoga: The Saratoga campaign, from July 30 to October 17, 1777
- Brandywine: The Battle of Brandywine on September 11, 1777
- Germantown: The Battle of Germantown on October 4, 1777
- Monmouth: The Battle of Monmouth on June 28, 1778
- Savannah: The Capture of Savannah on December 29, 1778
- Savannah: The Siege of Savannah, from September 16 to October 10, 1779
- Charleston: The Siege of Charleston, from March 29 to May 12, 1780
- Camden: The Battle of Camden on August 16, 1780
- Cowpens: The Battle of Cowpens on January 17, 1781
- Guilford Court House: The Battle of Guilford Court House on March 16, 1781
- Yorktown: The Siege of Yorktown from September 28 to October 19, 1781
