= Richard Knötel =

German artist

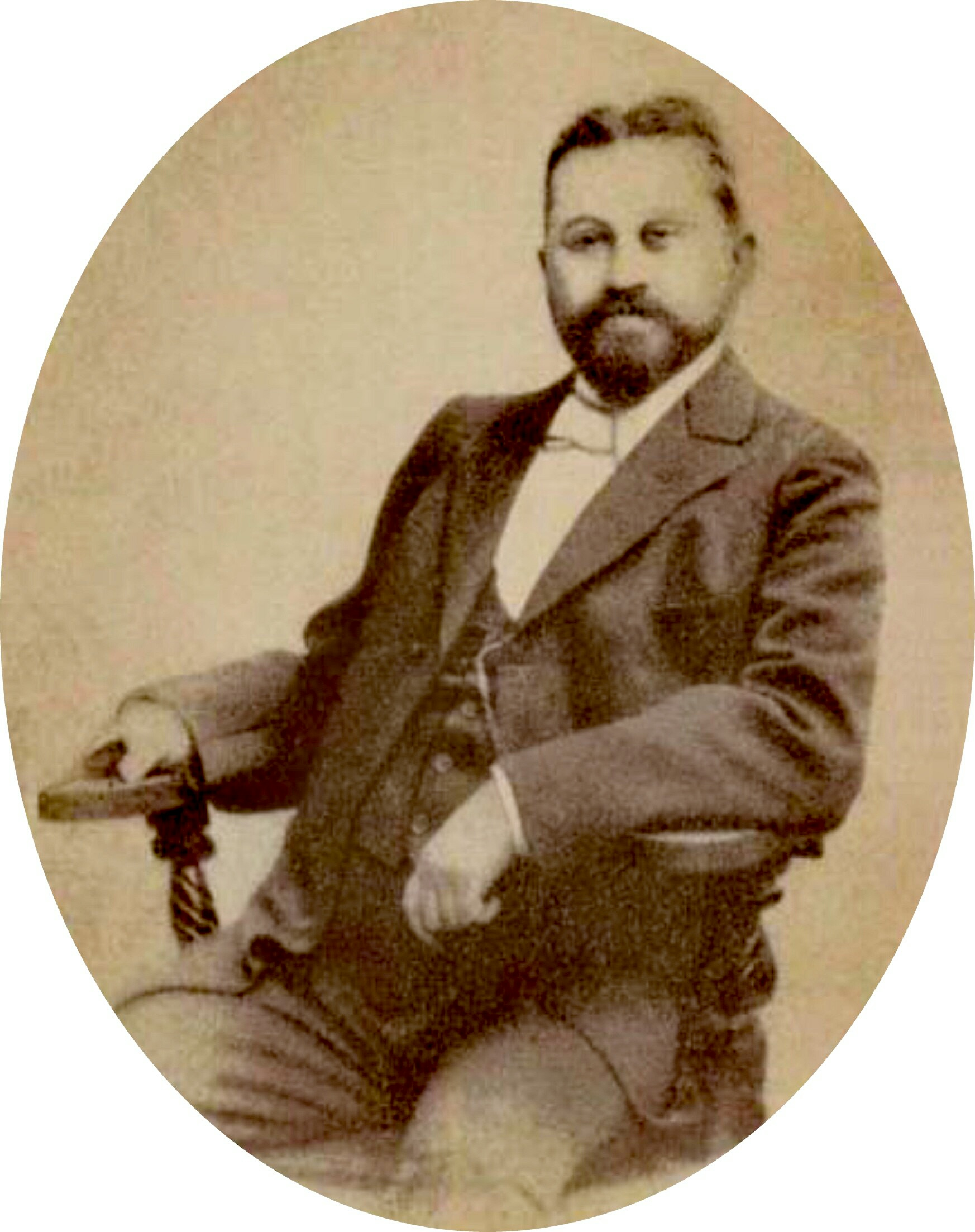
A photograph of Knötel

Richard Knötel (January 12, 1857 – April 26, 1914) was a German artist and pioneer of the study of military uniform.

== Life ==
Knötel was born in Glogau in 1857. His father, August Knötel, was an art teacher and gave him lessons in drawing and painting from an early age. In this time, Knötel developed an interest in military fashion and history. By late adolescence, he was already employed as an illustrator for the graphics-based newspaper; Illustrierte Zeitung, as well as for postcards and magazines. In 1880, with an established reputation, Knötel was entered into the Berlin Academy of Fine Arts.

After his studies, he began collecting books concerning European military history (it is believed that by his death he owned over 9000 titles), and began work on his most famous piece; Uniformenkunde, a huge collection of plates concerning the armies of Europe from the 17th century to 1914. Uniformenkunde is still perhaps the most widely referenced piece of work in the study of military attire of the early modern era, and is still used as a source today. As well as an illustrator, Knötel was a talented painter, who was renowned throughout Germany for his military subjects. As an artist he developed a friendship with the also famed military artist Carl Röchling, with whom he wrote The Old Fritz in 50 pictures for young and old (1895), a family book of German military history, and its sequel, The Queen Louise in 50 pictures for young and old (1896).

He died in Berlin in 1914, and is buried in Saint Matthew's Cemetery in the city.
