= Theodor Poeckh =

German portrait painter

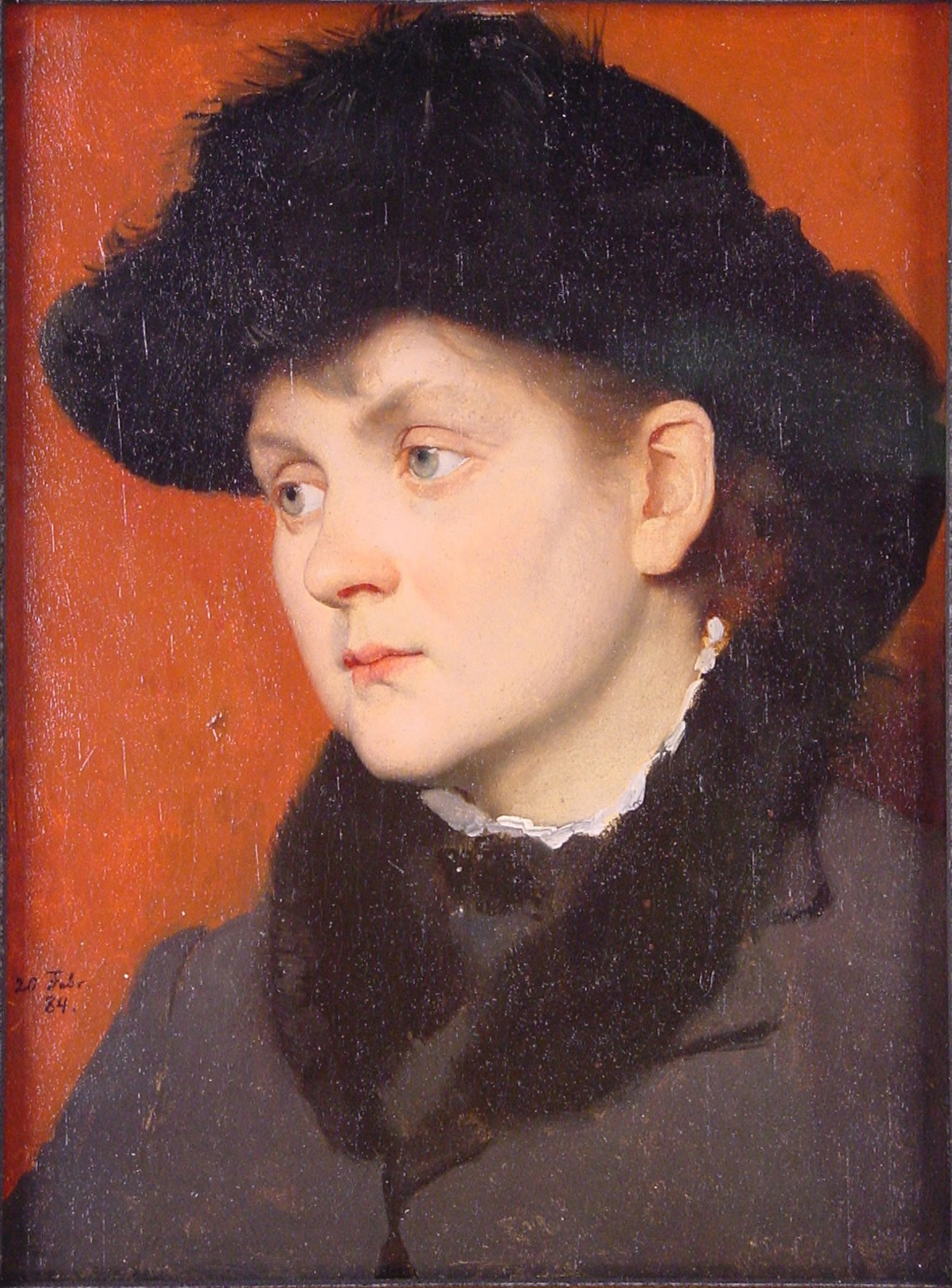
Portrait of a Woman

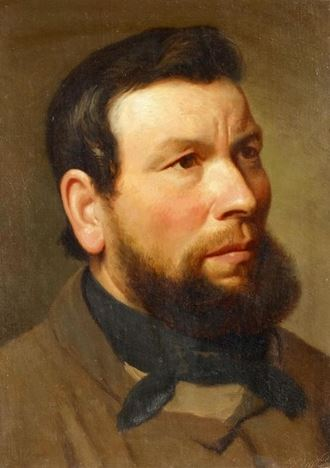
Portrait of a Man

Theodor Poeckh (20 April 1839, Braunschweig – 5 January 1921, Karlsruhe) was a German portrait painter.

== Biography ==
From 1860 to 1861, he was a student of Hans Fredrik Gude at the Kunstakademie Düsseldorf. After that, he attended the Academy of Fine Arts Munich, where he studied with Carl Theodor von Piloty.

He remained in Munich, until he was appointed to a teaching position at the Academy of Fine Arts, Karlsruhe; left vacant by the death Ludwig des Coudres. There, he took charge of the newly created nature and classical painting classes, with Ernst Schurth as an assistant. Some of his best known students were Christian Wilhelm Allers, Emil Schill, Pedro Weingärtner and Paul Schultze-Naumburg.

The Staatliche Kunsthalle Karlsruhe has a collection of his works.
