= Ferdinand Keller (painter) =

German painter

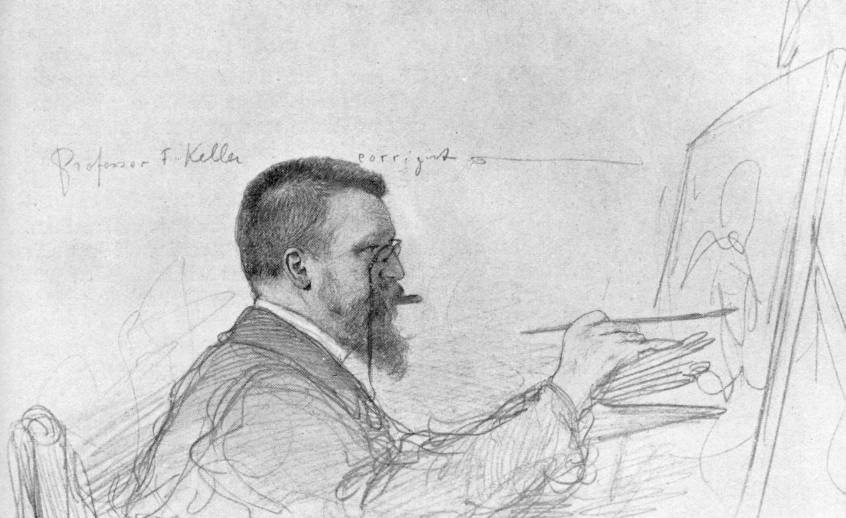
Ferdinand Keller correcting a student's work. Sketch by his student Christian Wilhelm Allers

Ferdinand Keller, or von Keller (5 August 1842 – 8 July 1922) was a German genre and history painter.

== Life ==
He was born in Karlsruhe to the family of a civil engineer. In 1857, when he was fifteen, his father was awarded a contract to design bridges, roads and dams in Brazil. Ferdinand and his brother Franz were able to accompany him. Over the course of a four-year stay, he was able to teach himself drawing by sketching the tropical landscape. Shortly after their return, he enrolled at the Academy of Fine Arts, Karlsruhe, where he studied with Johann Wilhelm Schirmer, the former Director of the academy. After Schirmer's death, he studied with Ludwig des Coudres.

He was unsatisfied with the academy, however, and took private lessons in the studio of Hans Canon. This was followed, in 1866 and 1867, by study trips to Switzerland and France. He achieved his first recognition with his painting "The Death of Philip II" at the International Exposition. From 1867 to 1869, he lived in Rome, where he made the acquaintance of Anselm Feuerbach and maintained a joint studio with him.

In 1870, he became a teacher of portrait and history painting at the Karlsruhe Academy and was appointed a professor in 1873. From 1880 to 1913, he served as director.

In addition to his regular paintings, he provided decorations and curtains for the new Karlsruhe Court Theater and the Dresden Semperoper. His decorations for the King Carl Hall at the Landesmuseum Württemberg pleased the King so much that he awarded Keller a title of nobility. Frederick I, Grand Duke of Baden, commissioned him to paint the "History of Baden", now on display at the Staatliche Kunsthalle Baden-Baden. On a smaller scale, his etchings have been used to illustrate numerous books.

He died in 1922 in Baden-Baden. A street in Karlsruhe was named after him in 1964.

== Selected paintings ==
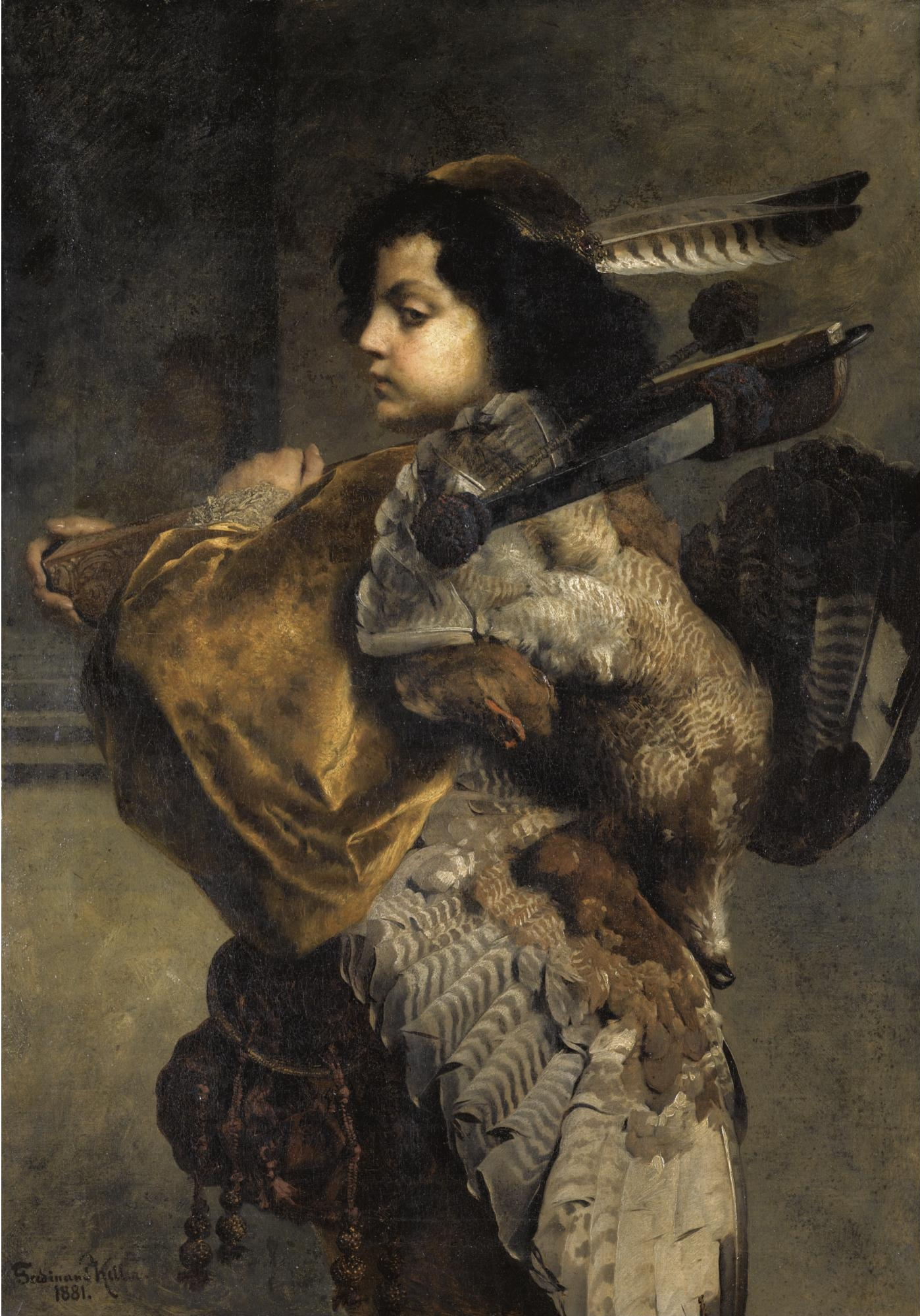
Young Hunter (1881)

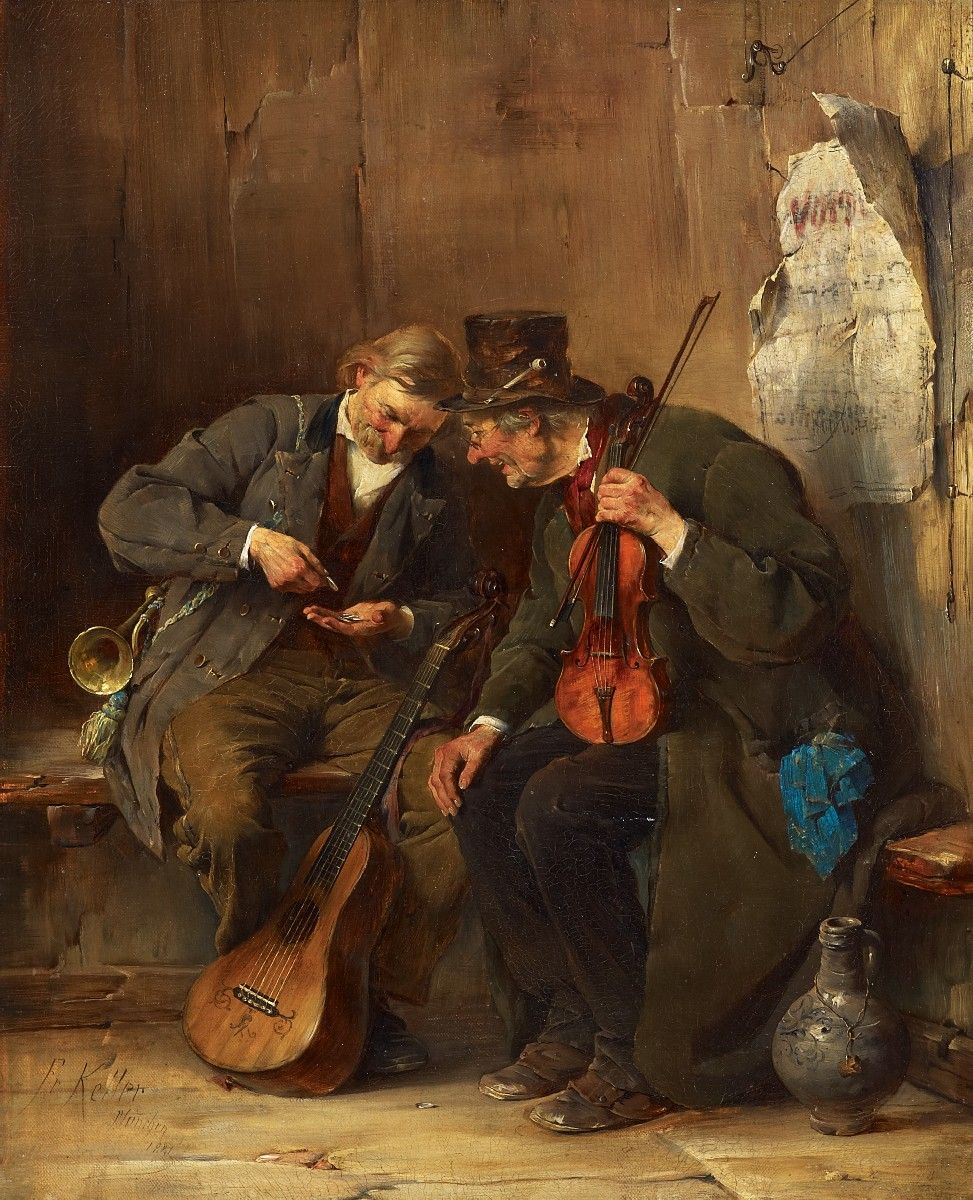
Payment (1883)

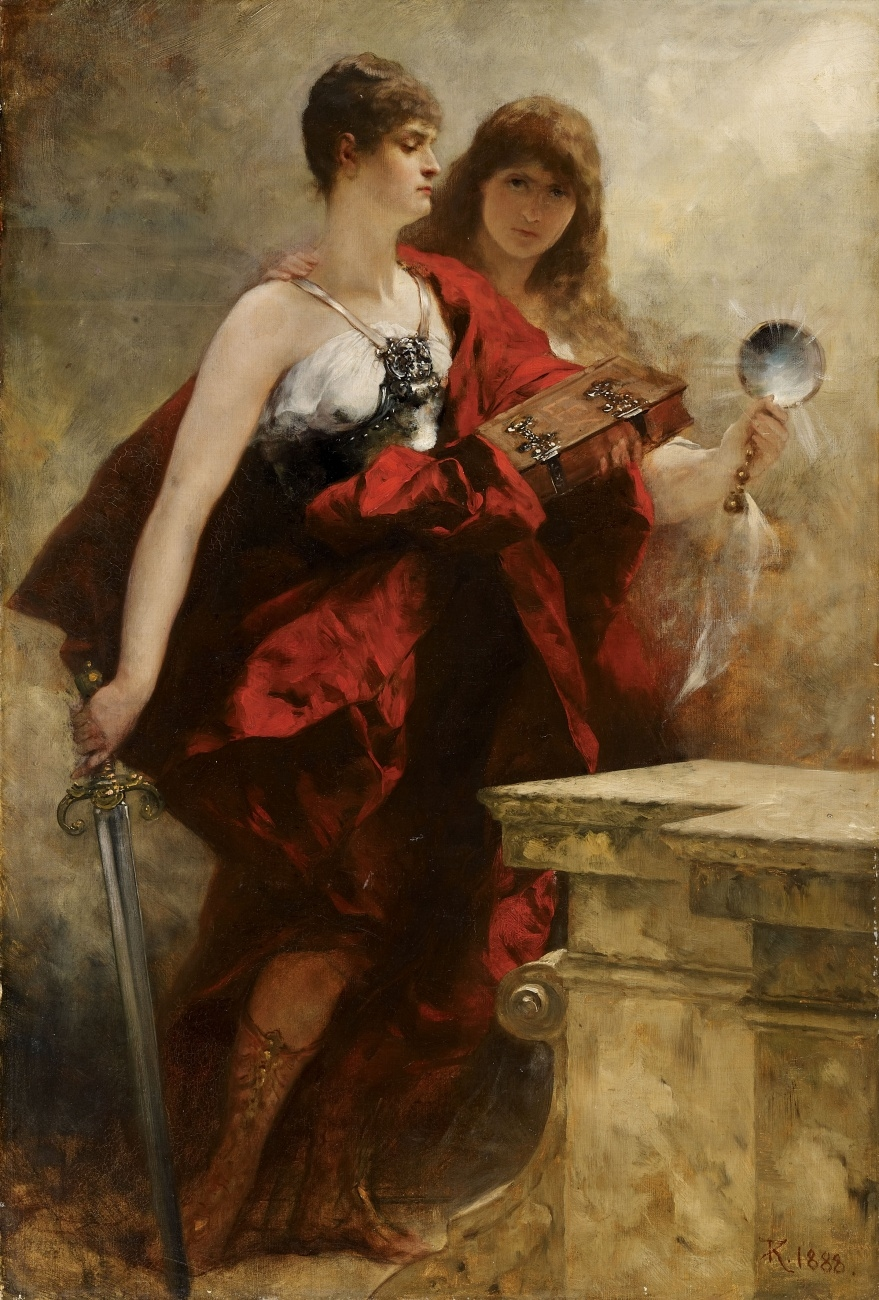
Study on the Apotheosis of Kaiser Wilhelm I (1888)

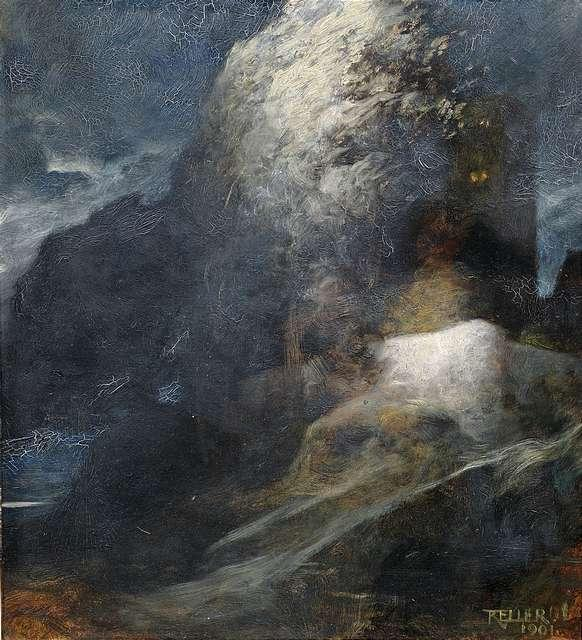
The Island of Death (1901)

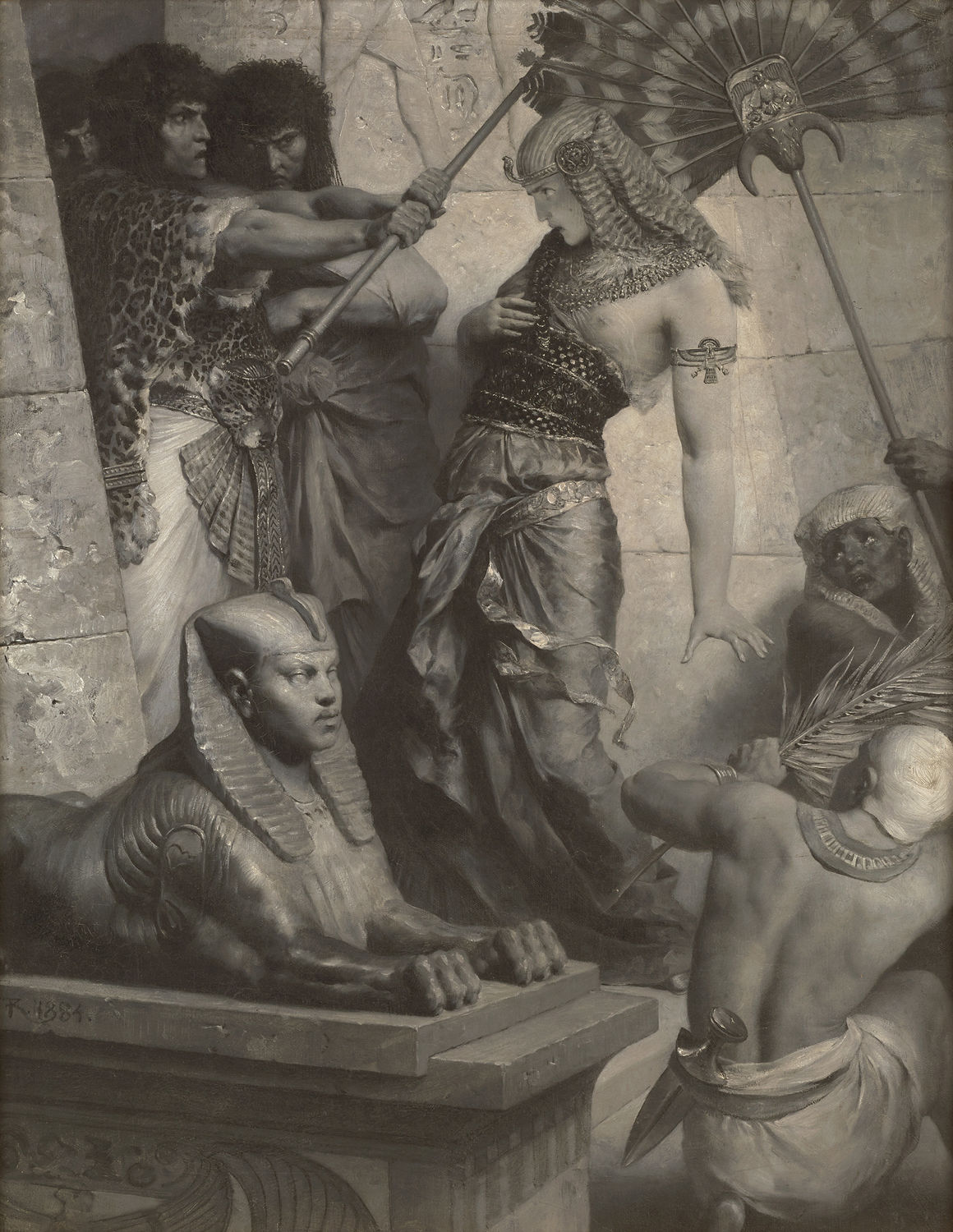
The Guardians of the Temple (1884). Painted in grisaille.
