= Isle of the Dead (mythology) =

Place in pre-Christian Celtic mythology

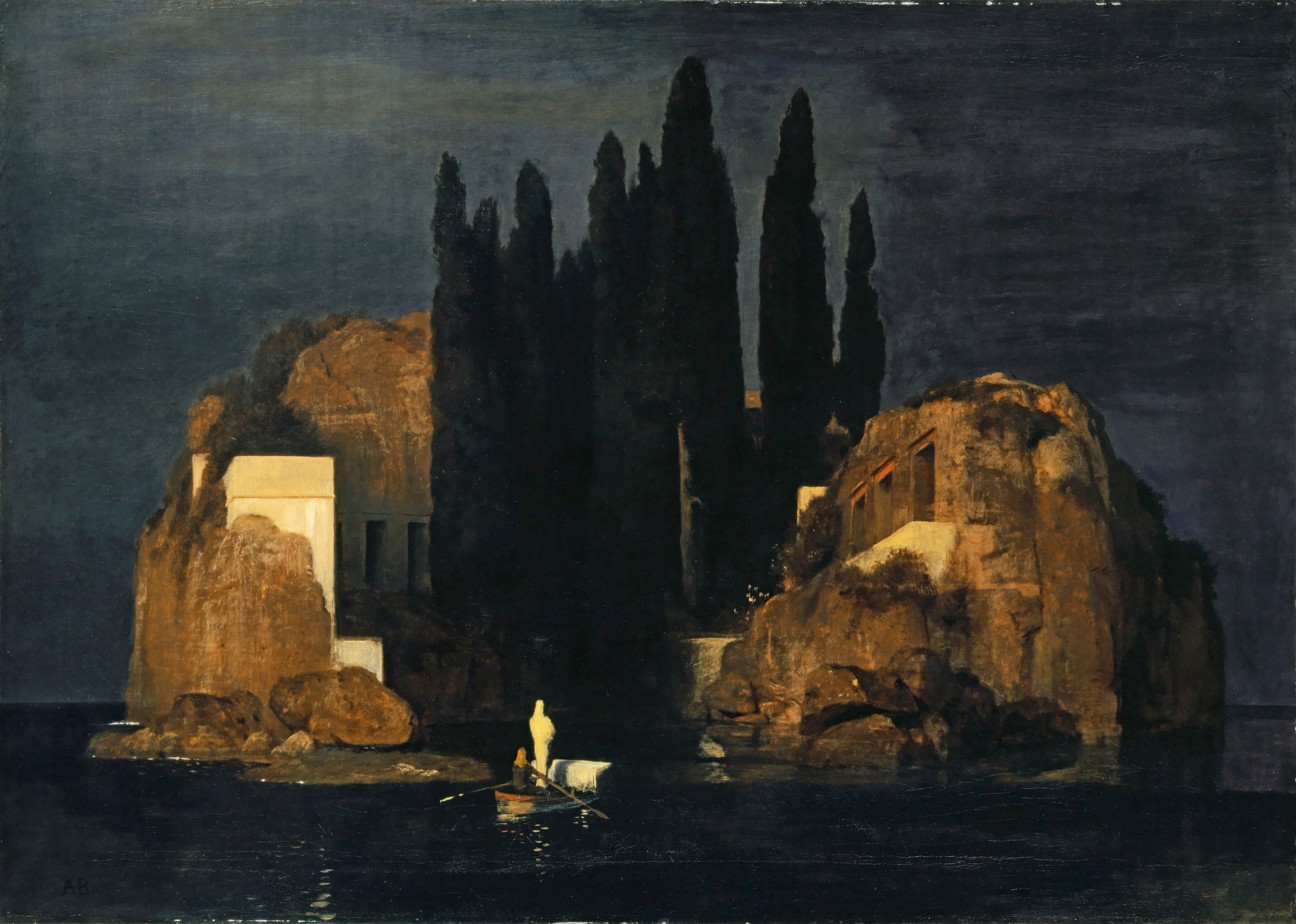
Isle of the Dead as imagined in 1880 by Arnold Böcklin

The Isle of the Dead is a concept from pre-Christian Europe of an island to the west where souls went after death. It is reported as being part of Celtic belief by several Roman historians, and evidence for this belief is also found in Welsh folklore. It also existed in ancient Germanic traditions where the British Isles were sometimes depicted as the isles to the west that the dead inhabited.

In Irish belief the Isle of Tech Duinn are said to be the domain of Donn after he was cursed by the Tuatha De. It is said his body was cast unto the isle at his own bidding to avoid cursing his brothers and washed up on what would become the isle of Tech Duinn. This isle is stated to be the gathering place of the dead and where all souls of sinners are gathered "before they go to hell".

A particularly detailed late-antique account of such an island of the dead appears from Procopius in his sixth century History of the Wars, describing an island he calls Brittia (distinguished, in his account, from Brettania) and associated with Britons, Angles and Frisians. Procopius relates that certain inhabitants of the coast opposite Brittia were excused from the ordinary obligations of life because they took turns transporting the souls of the dead to this island. At night, these designated ferrymen supposedly heard an unseen summons, went to boats that appeared empty, and found the vessels weighed down by invisible passengers. The crossing to Brittia, normally a much longer voyage, was completed in approximately an hour, and upon reaching the island, the boats became light again, with unseen voices announced the identities of the dead as they disembarked.
