= Carl Röchling =

German painter and illustrator

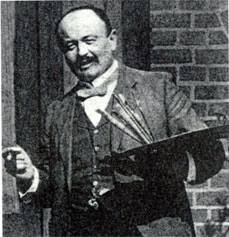
Carl Röchling

Carl Röchling (October 18, 1855 – May 6, 1920) was a German painter and illustrator known for his representation of historical military themes.

== Life ==
Röchling was born in Saarbrücken, part of the Prussian Rhine Province, son of Friedrich Röchling, a judiciary worker, and Angelika Stoll. He studied from 1875 to 1880 in the Karlsruhe Academy of Arts (Kunstschule) with Ludwig des Coudres and Ernst Hildebrand and later in the Prussian Academy of Arts.

While in Berlin, he was a pupil of the great master painter Anton von Werner, with whom he participated in the creation of various panoramic paintings such as Der Schlacht von Sedan ("The Battle of Sedan"). Later he became well known for his independent work of historical and military paintings in the turn of the 19th century. He died on May 6, 1920, in Berlin.

== Works ==
Among Röchling's most famous works of military themes are various depictions of battle scenes of Prussian army victories, especially those during the Franco-Prussian War.

Together with Georg Koch and Eugen Bracht a panorama of the Battle of Chattanooga is among his works. He also worked in partnership with Richard Knötel and Woldemar Friedrich in illustrating two popular children books (Der Alte Fritz in 50 Bildern für Jung und Alt in 1895 and Die Königin Luise in 50 Bildern für Jung und Alt in 1896).

== Gallery ==
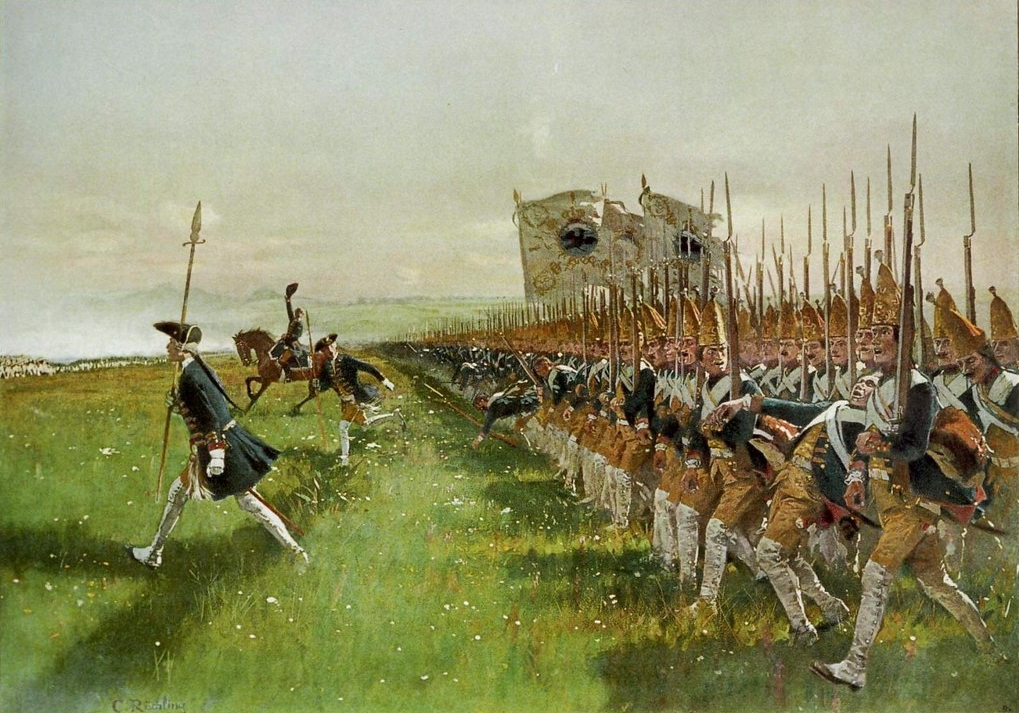
Battle of Hohenfriedberg - Attack of Prussian Infantry, June 4th, 1745

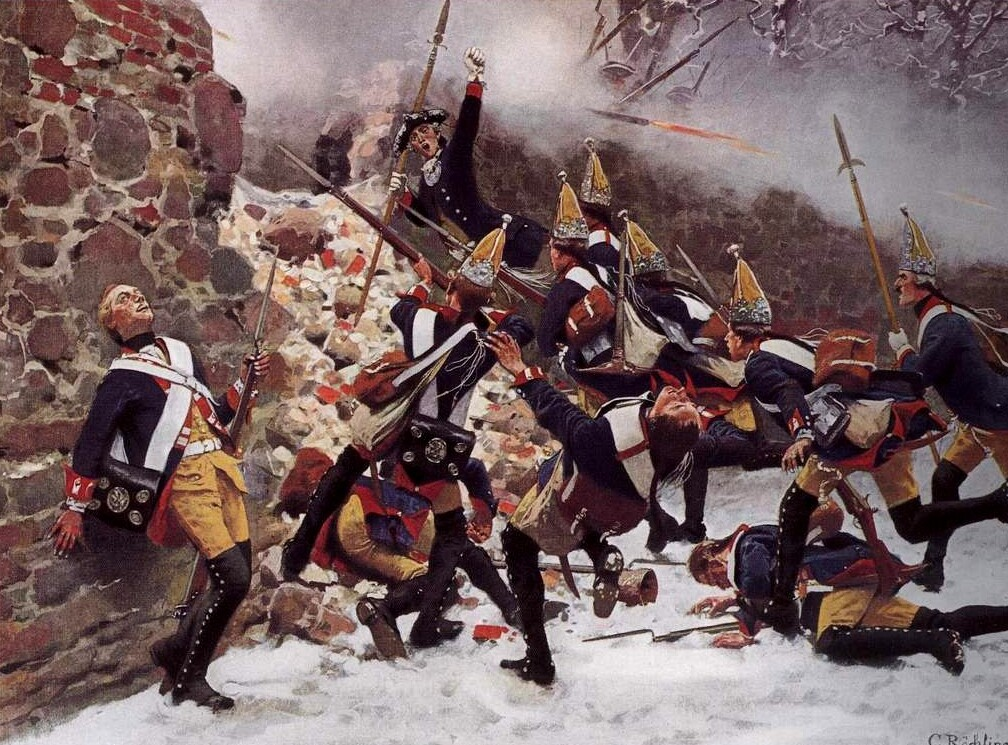
Storming of the breach by Prussian troops during the Battle of Leuthen, 1757

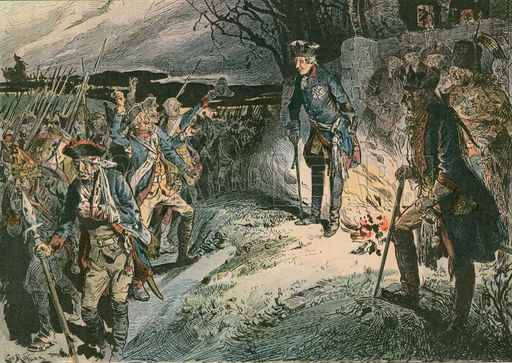
Frederick the Great after defeat at the Battle of Hochkirch in 1758

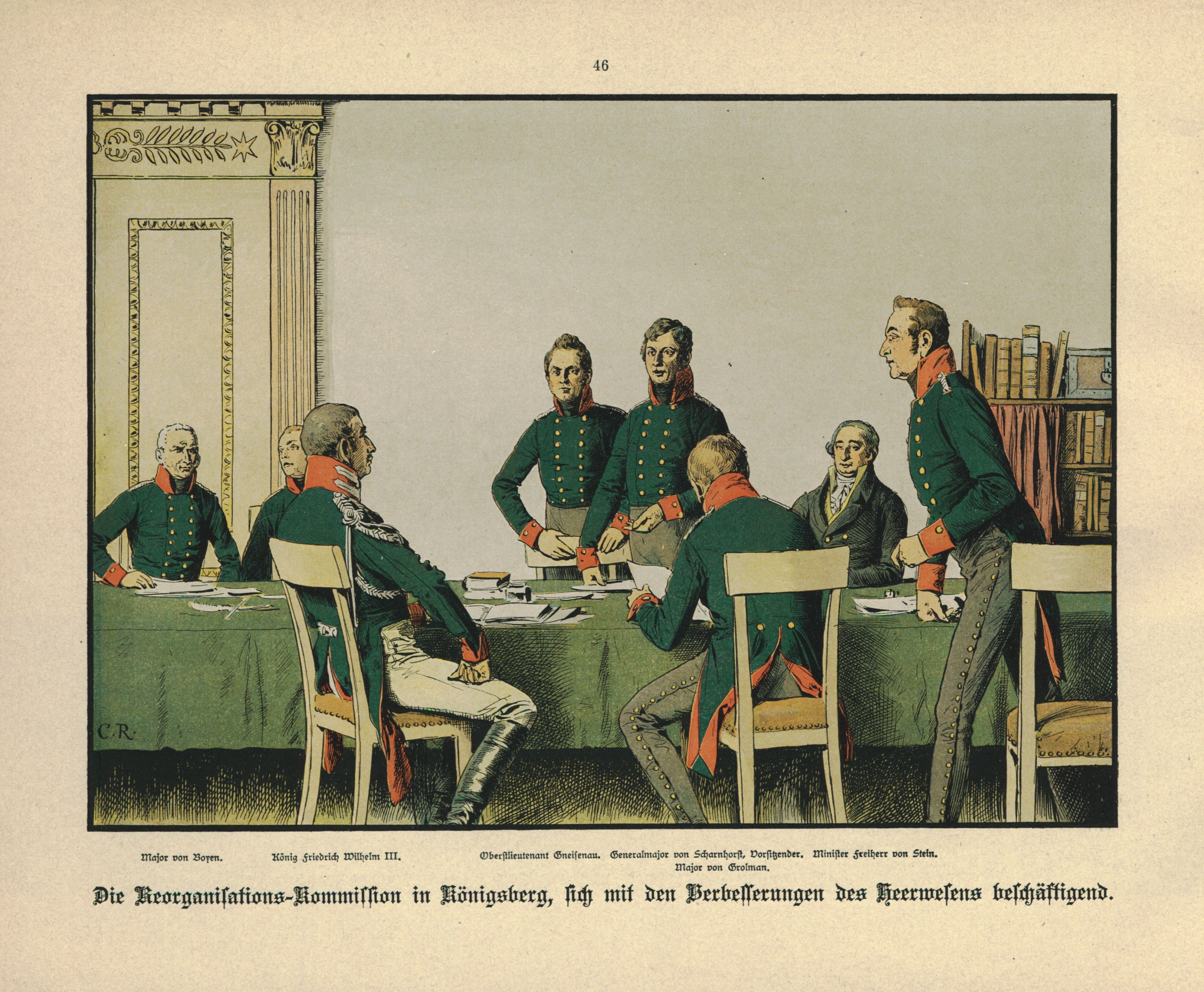
Meeting of the reformers in Königsberg in 1807

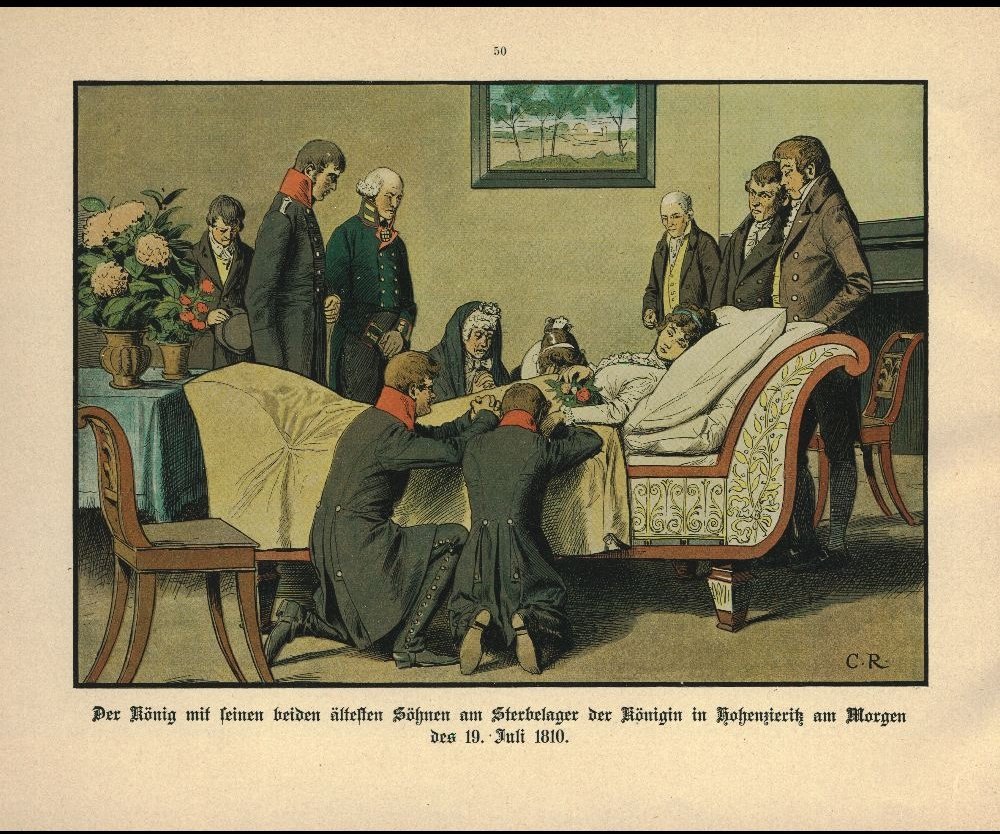
Dying Queen Louise

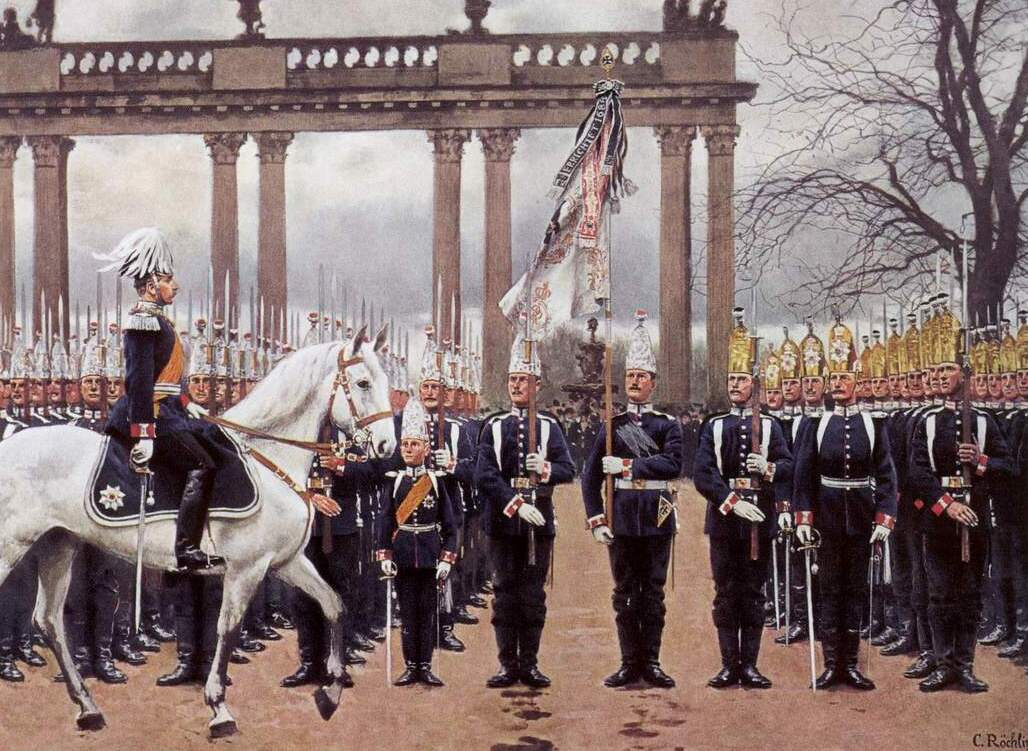
Parade in the Lustgarten February 9, 1894

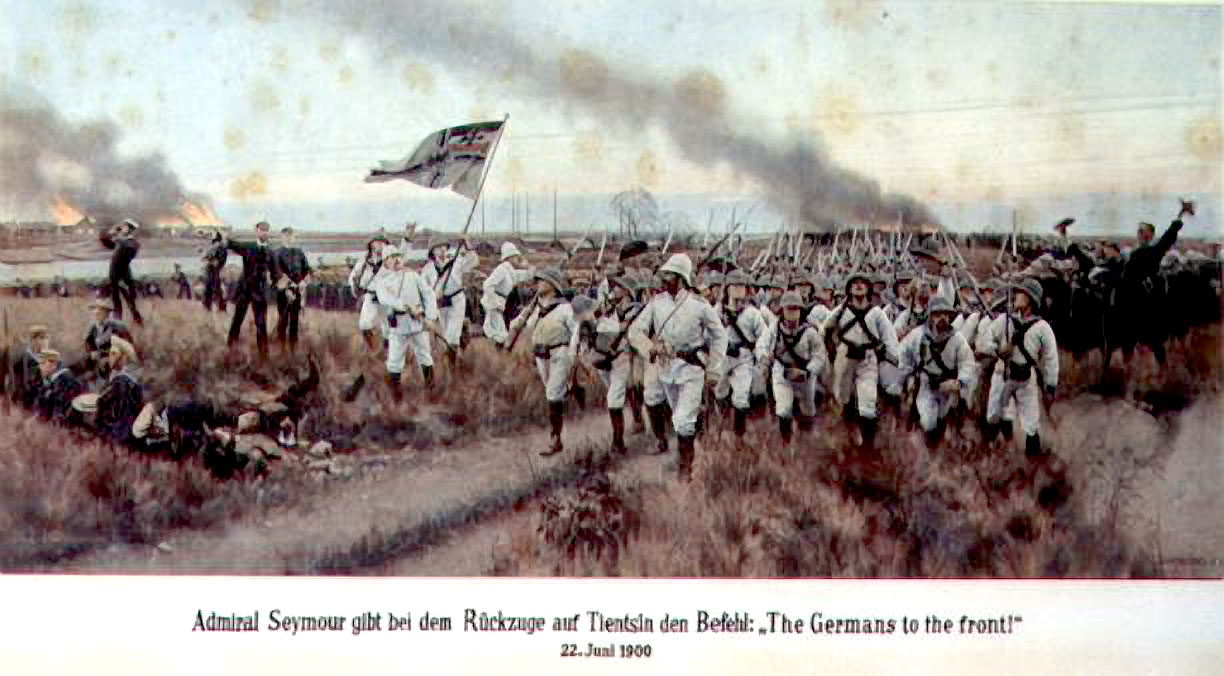
The Germans to the front - depicting German troops advancing during Boxer Rebellion near Tientsin, China, 1900
