= Heideblick =

- Municipality
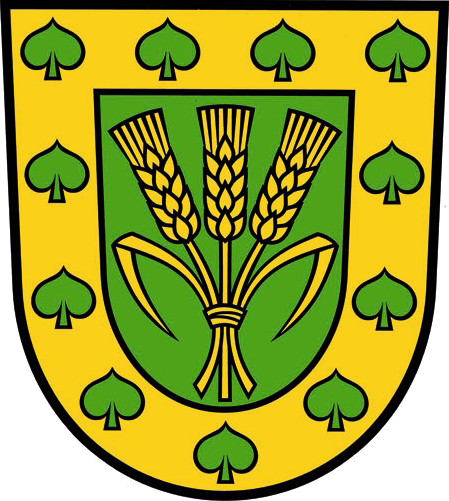
- Coat of arms

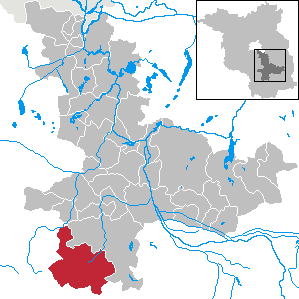
- Location of Heideblick within Dahme-Spreewald district
- Interactive map of Heideblick
- Location within Germany Location within Brandenburg
- Coordinates: 51°47′59″N 13°39′00″E
- Country: Germany
- State: Brandenburg
- District: Dahme-Spreewald
- Subdivisions: 12 Ortsteile

Government
  - Mayor (2019–27): Frank Deutschmann

Area
  - Total: 165.31 km^{2} (63.83 sq mi)
- Elevation: 64 m (210 ft)

Population (2025-12-31)
  - Total: 3,448
  - Density: 20.86/km^{2} (54.02/sq mi)
- Time zone: UTC+01:00 (CET)
  - Summer (DST): UTC+02:00 (CEST)
- Postal codes: 15926
- Dialling codes: 035454, 035455, 03544
- Vehicle registration: LDS
- Website: www.heideblick.de

Heideblick is a municipality in the district of Dahme-Spreewald in Brandenburg in Germany.

== Demography ==
Development of Population since 1875 within the Current Boundaries (Blue Line: Population; Dotted Line: Comparison to Population Development of Brandenburg state; Grey Background: Time of Nazi rule; Red Background: Time of Communist rule)

Recent Population Development and Projections (Population Development before Census 2011 (blue line); Recent Population Development according to the Census in Germany in 2011 (blue bordered line); Official projections for 2005-2030 (yellow line); for 2020-2030 (green line); for 2017-2030 (scarlet line)

Heideblick: Population development
within the current boundaries (2017)

Year	Pop.	±% p.a.
1875	5,587	—
1890	5,124	−0.58%
1910	5,262	+0.13%
1925	5,513	+0.31%
1933	5,281	−0.54%
1939	5,258	−0.07%
1946	7,584	+5.37%
1950	7,124	−1.55%
1964	5,505	−1.82%
1971	5,466	−0.10%
1981	5,015	−0.86%
1985	5,244	+1.12%
1989	5,127	−0.56%
1990	5,068	−1.15%
1991	4,990	−1.54%

Year	Pop.	±% p.a.
1992	4,953	−0.74%
1993	4,924	−0.59%
1994	4,912	−0.24%
1995	4,897	−0.31%
1996	4,848	−1.00%
1997	4,765	−1.71%
1998	4,779	+0.29%
1999	4,662	−2.45%
2000	4,642	−0.43%
2001	4,612	−0.65%
2002	4,545	−1.45%
2003	4,487	−1.28%
2004	4,401	−1.92%
2005	4,320	−1.84%
2006	4,222	−2.27%

Year	Pop.	±% p.a.
2007	4,172	−1.18%
2008	4,088	−2.01%
2009	4,059	−0.71%
2010	3,974	−2.09%
2011	3,834	−3.52%
2012	3,747	−2.27%
2013	3,679	−1.81%
2014	3,679	+0.00%
2015	3,666	−0.35%
2016	3,603	−1.72%
2017	3,563	−1.11%
2018	3,572	+0.25%
2019	3,558	−0.39%
2020	3,543	−0.42%
