= Brazilian sculpture =

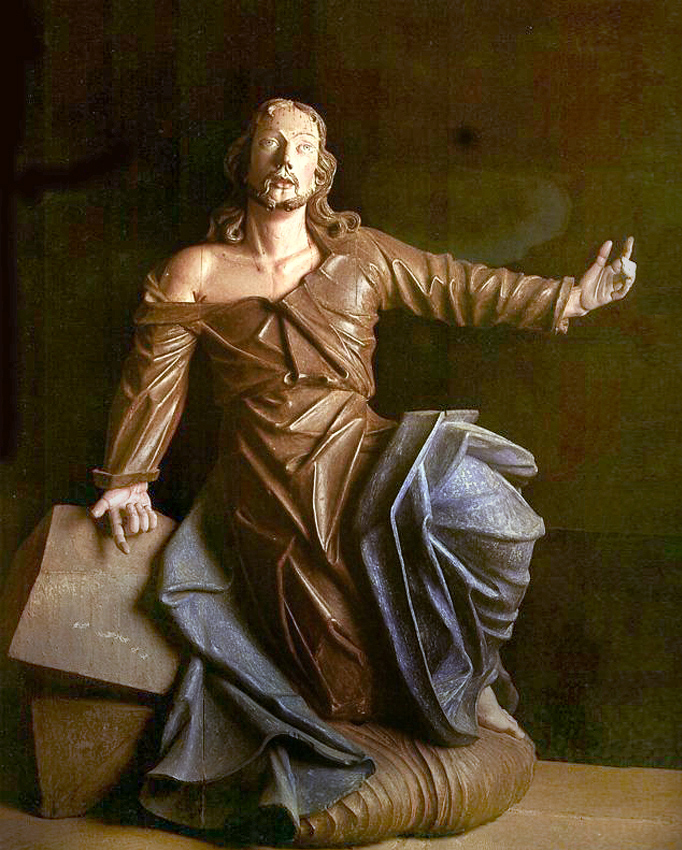
Aleijadinho: Christ Praying, 1796–1808. Bom Jesus de Matosinhos Sanctuary

The roots of Brazilian sculpture have been traced back to the late 16th century, emerging soon after the first settlements in the newly discovered land. Through the following century, most of the sculpture in Brazil was brought from Portugal and displayed Baroque features. The Baroque style would flourish within the religious culture of the country and would remain predominant until the first decades of the 19th century. In the 19th century, sculptural activity decreased, but it later revived when both the government and the public took a new interest in the art. Modernism fomented a period of intense research into a new language of sculpture, with great achievements, and the contemporary sculpture of Brazil enjoys worldwide respect.

== Baroque ==
The mid 17th century saw the emergence of the first national school of sculpture with the works of Domingos da Conceição, Agostinho da Piedade and Agostinho de Jesus, now seen as the founders of Brazilian sculpture. Through the 17th and 18th centuries, there were major centers of sculpture production in Salvador and Olinda and in some cities in Minas Gerais and São Paulo. Although Portuguese pieces continued to be imported in great numbers, native masters proliferated. They took refined European models as a source for their inspiration, adapting their general lines toward a folk interpretation of the Baroque style. Decorative woodcarving would also be largely dependent on Portuguese influence, but it flourished with great splendor, as can be seen inside the many churches erected during this period.

Most surviving pieces from the Baroque era do not record authorship, and only a few names are known: Francisco das Chagas, Manuel Inácio da Costa, Francisco Xavier de Brito and Francisco Vieira Servas. Above them all stands Aleijadinho. He was active in Minas Gerais where he left his greatest works, considered the glory of Brazilian Baroque sculpture: six groups of wooden carved statues known as the Via Sacra cycle and the 12 Prophets carved in soapstone, all at Bom Jesus de Matosinhos Sanctuary in Congonhas do Campo, now a World Heritage Site. The Baroque tradition survived until the beginning of the 20th century, albeit more and more sparsely and mainly in Bahia, despite the introduction of Neoclassicism in the 1820s.

Two special genres of sculpture deserve mention in the Baroque period: the missionary sculpture and the so-called de roca statues. The first flourished in the Reductions and was produced by Indians, often helped by Jesuit missionaries, as part of the Jesuits' method of teaching religion to the Indians, who were deeply impressed with and moved by European art. Its style is a highly original synthesis of European influences with the native vision. These creations are of great interest because of their plastic quality and their unique flavor. Although most of them have disappeared, either sold abroad, reshaped, or destroyed, many pieces do remain, preserved mainly by the Missions Museum in Rio Grande do Sul, and they are Brazilian National Heritage. The second special genre, the de roca statues, were also sacred in nature and shared a common purpose with the missionary art, as both were didactic. Manipulated by puppeteers in plays of a sacred character, they were instrumental in exciting piety in the people, enhancing the dramatic effect of the play. They were also commonly carried by chariots or other movable devices as part of a procession.

== 19th century ==
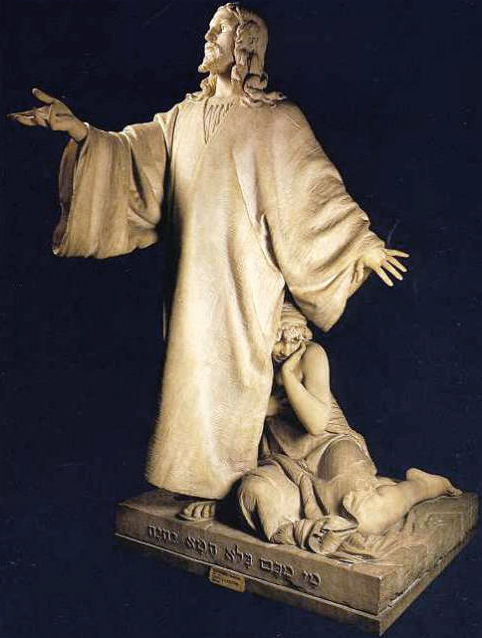
Rodolpho Bernardelli: Christ and the Adulterous Woman, 1881. Museu Nacional de Belas Artes

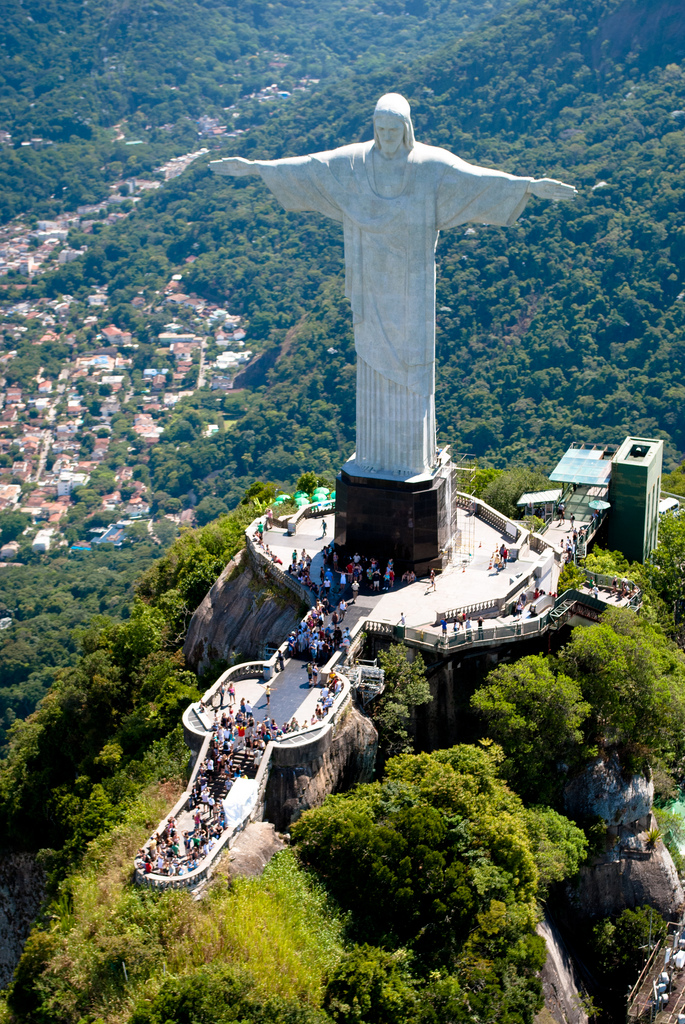
Christ the Redeemer, by Paul Landowski and Gheorghe Leonida, dedicated 1931, Rio de Janeiro

After the arrival of King John VI of Portugal and his court in 1808, a group of French refugees known as the French Artistic Mission proposed, in 1816, the creation of an Academy of Arts on the model of the Académie de peinture et de sculpture in Paris. The Brazilian Academy, called the Royal School of Sciences, Arts and Crafts, later restructured as the Imperial Academy of Fine Arts, dominated Brazilian art for more than 100 years. The academy merged, following further restructuring, with the Federal University of Rio de Janeiro in 1931.

During the 19th century, Brazilian sculpture declined severely. Religious tradition, until then the greatest source of inspiration, was displaced by secular concerns, and only a few important artists were active, all of them working within the academic circle, displaying a mixed blend of styles: Neoclassical, Romantic, and Realist. The only great name in this impoverished period was Rodolfo Bernardelli, but others deserve mention: Marc Ferrez, Honorato Manoel de Lima, Francisco Elídio Pânfiro and Francisco Manuel Chaves Pinheiro. Cândido Caetano de Almeida Reis and Décio Villares, both noteworthy talents, left some fine pieces.

== Modern and Contemporary ==
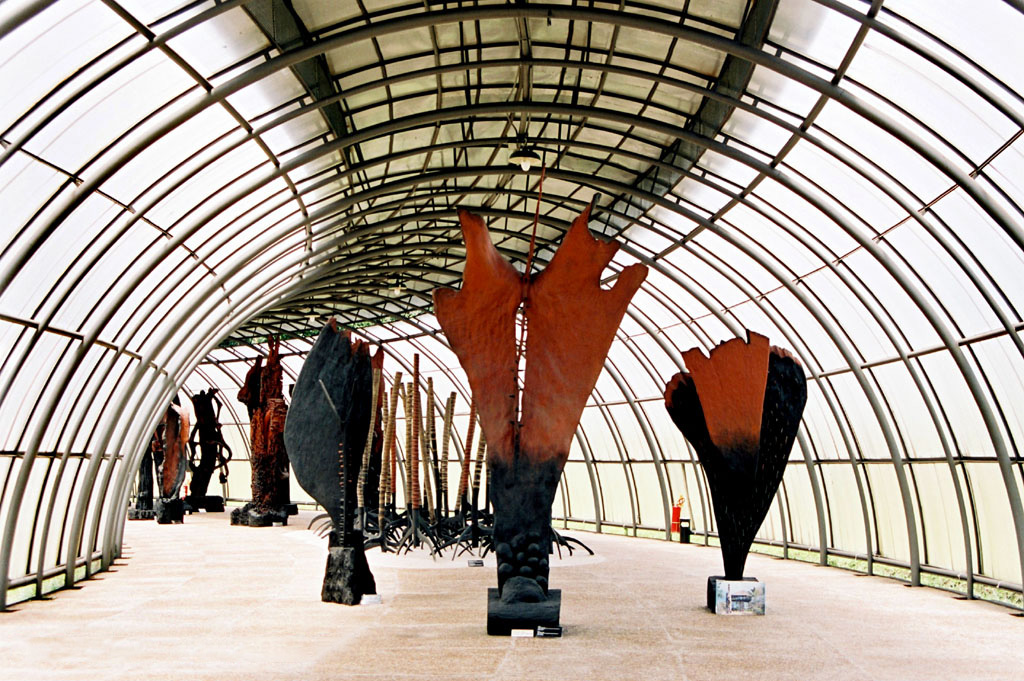
Franz Krajberg, c. 1980–1990

The last years of the 19th century witnessed increasing diversity of styles. In the beginning of the 20th century, Brazilian sculpture regained strength and was evolving across Neo-Gothic, Art Nouveau, Symbolism, and Art Deco. Funerary sculpture opened up as a major market, and official art produced some important monuments. Eclectic pieces crowded on many facades, sacred sculptors were active, and a renewed interest in the art became evident. Modestino Kanto, Celso Antônio Silveira de Menezes, Ettore Ximenes, Amadeu Zani, Elio de Giusto, Adolfo Rollo, and Francisco Leopoldo e Silva produced fine pieces in this phase.

Victor Brecheret was the leading name for introducing Modernist taste into Brazilian sculpture, seconded by Quirino da Silva, Lasar Segall, Antônio Gomide, Elisabeth Nobiling, Bruno Giorgi, Julio Guerra, Ernesto de Fiori and Alfredo Ceschiatti. A landmark in this development was the 1951 São Paulo Art Biennial, which lent abstract sculpture official support by granting first prize to a piece by Swiss artist Max Bill.

Thereafter, abstract art flourished, displaying several interpretations of the style, but figurative tendencies did not vanish, combining with, or sometimes not, various grades of abstraction. The pop art and Neo-expressionism of the 1960s contributed variety, and in the 1970s, Conceptualism broadened ideas about artistic creation and the significance of art, and the range of materials used for sculpting opened wide. Since the 1980s, Brazilian sculpture has been consistently taught in many universities, and in the beginning of the 21st century, many Brazilian artists enjoy international approval, such as Francisco Brennand, Franz Weissmann, Amílcar de Castro, Lygia Clark, Sergio de Camargo, Sérvulo Esmeraldo, Frans Krajcberg, Sonia Ebling, Iole de Freitas, Willys de Castro, and Waltércio Caldas.

== Gallery ==
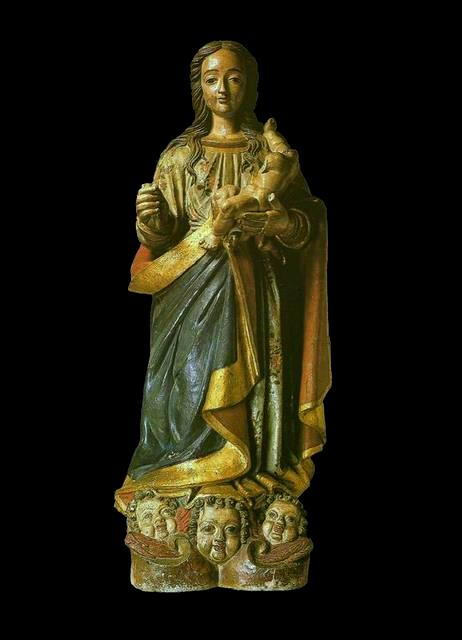
Agostinho de Jesus: Our Lady of Purification, 17th century. São Paulo Museum of Sacred Art

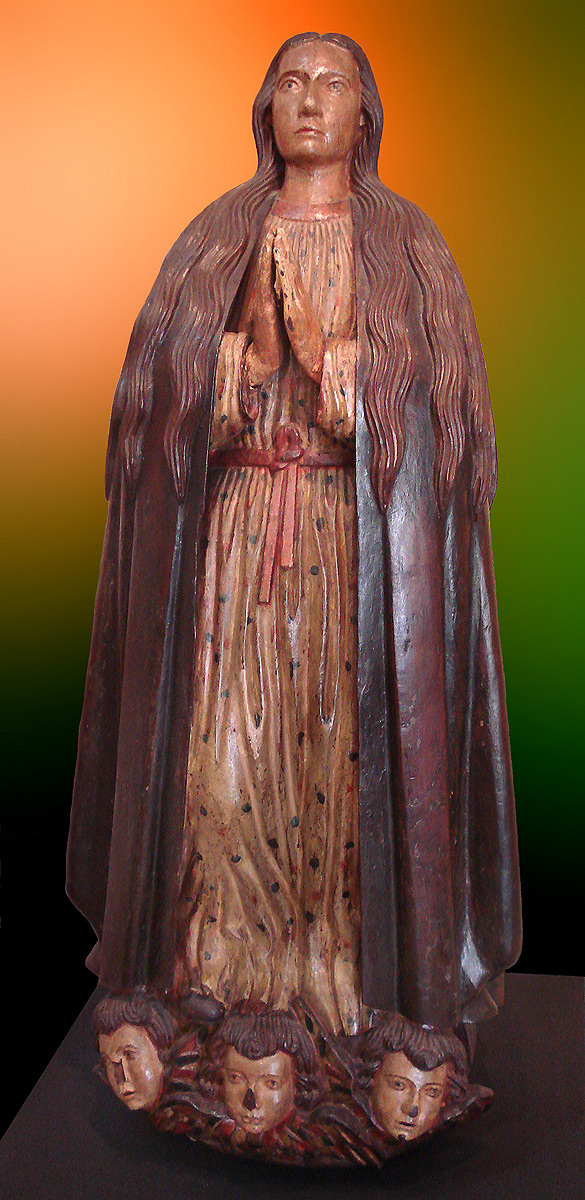
Immaculate Conception, Jesuit-Indian piece, 18th century. Júlio de Castilhos Museum

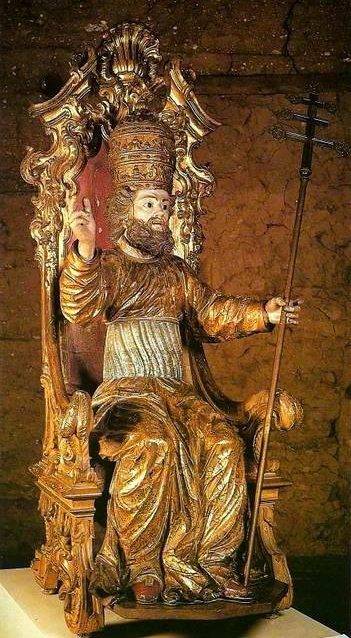
St. Peter Pope, 18th century. Portuguese school. São Paulo Museum of Sacred Art

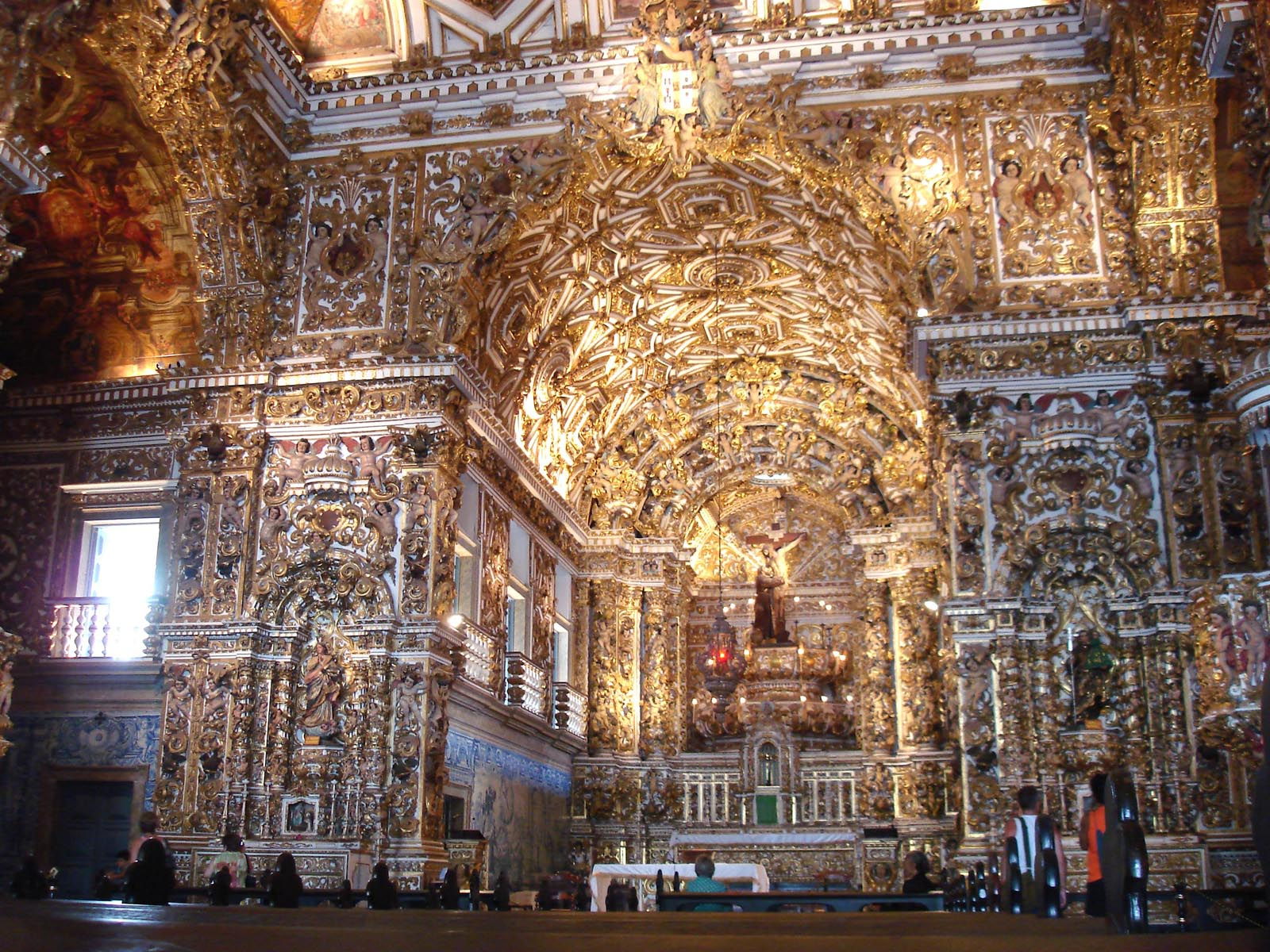
Interior of St. Francis of Assisi Church, Salvador, showing the extraordinarily rich woodcarving.

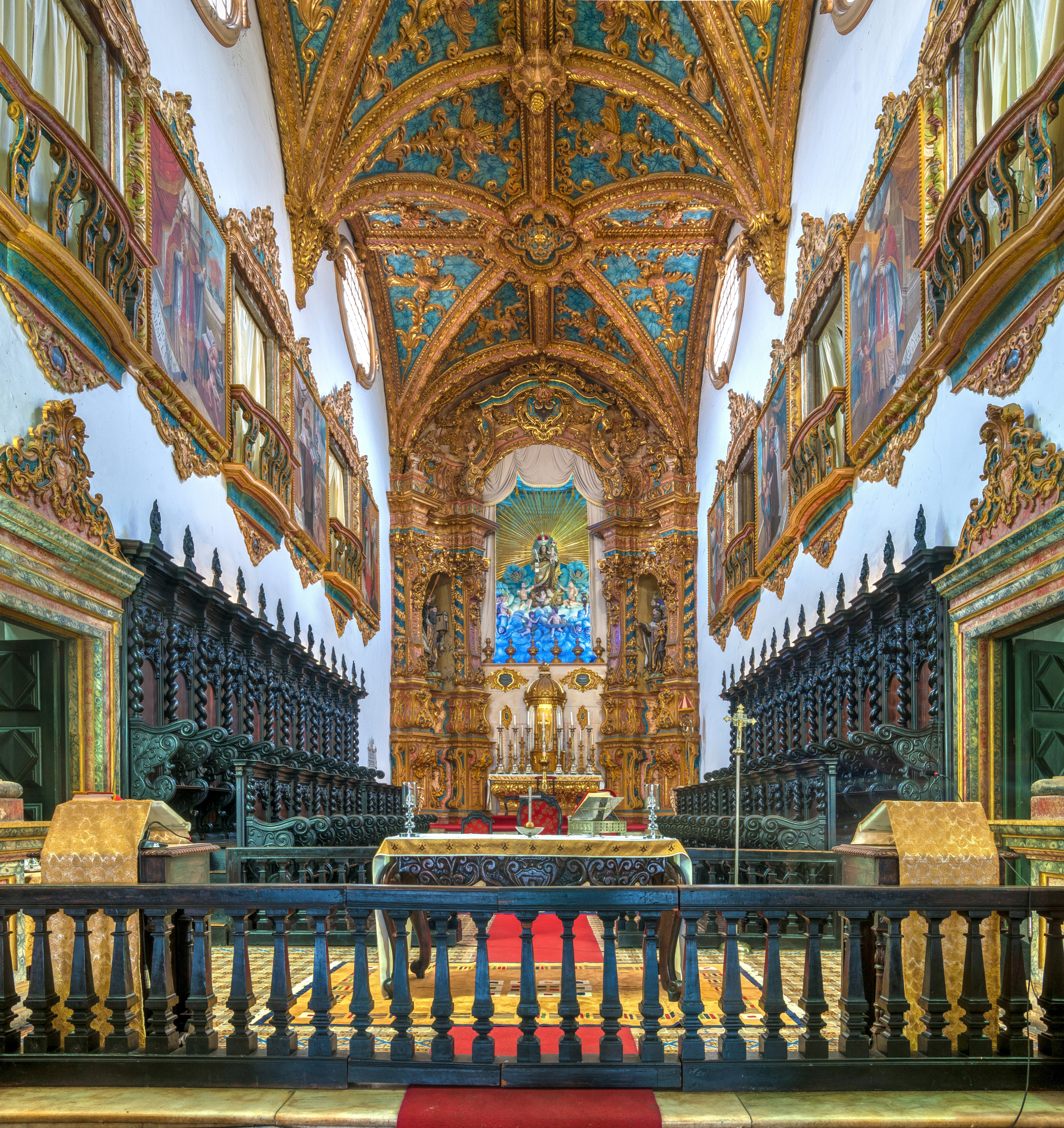
High altar of Our Lady of Carmo Church, Recife

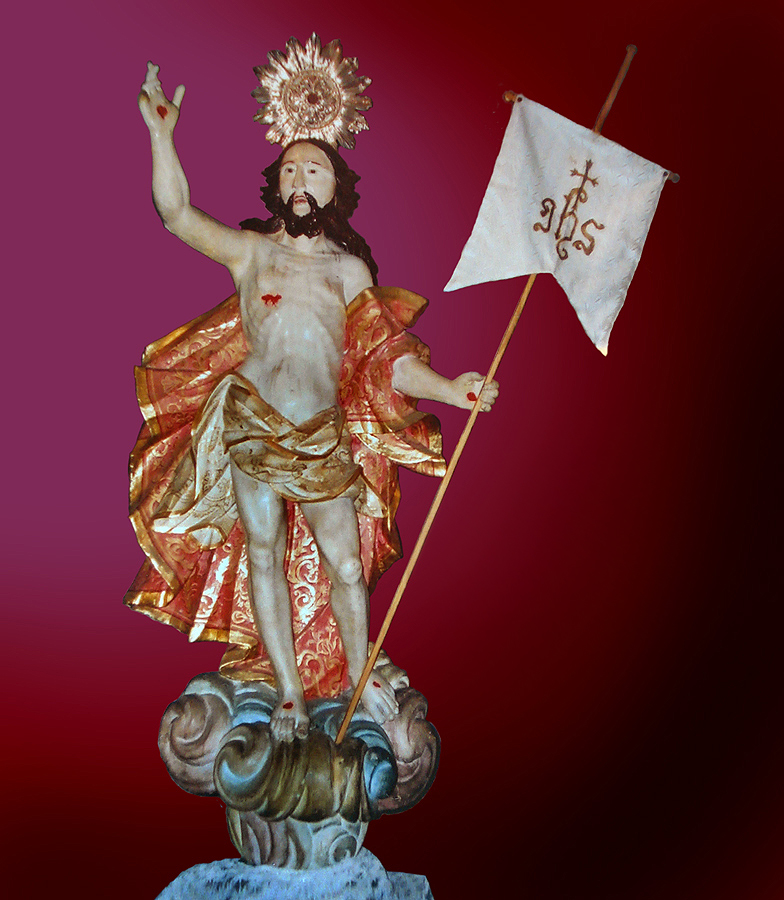
Christ resurrected, 18th century. School of Bahia

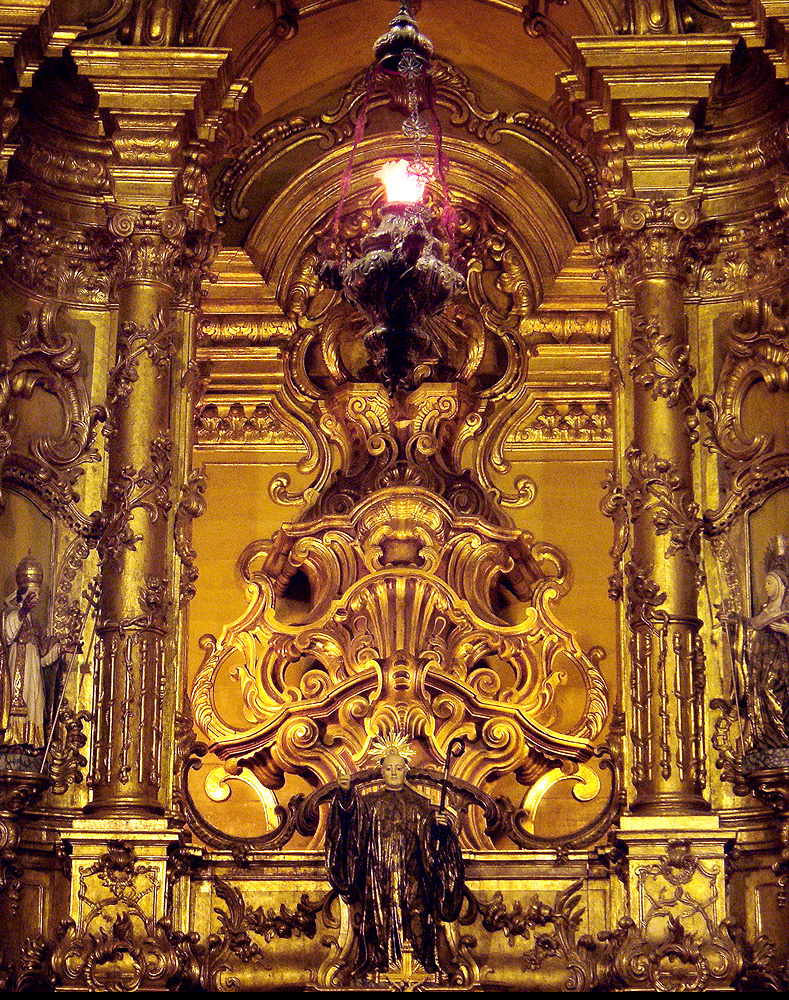
Detail of the high altar of Saint Benedict in Saint Benedict Church, Olinda

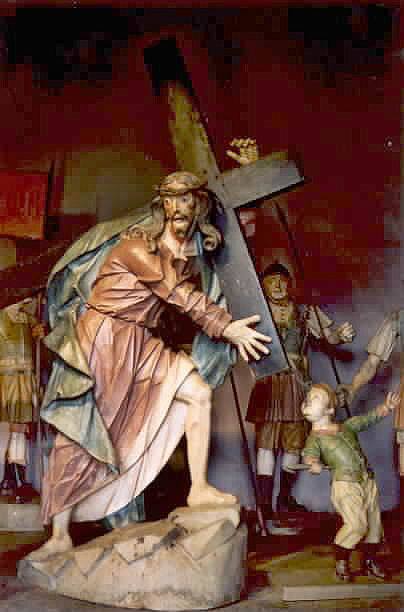
Aleijadinho: Christ bearing the Cross, 1796–1808. Bom Jesus de Matosinhos Sanctuary

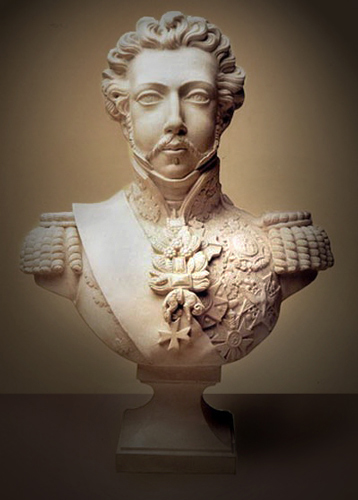
Marc Ferrez: Bust of emperor Peter I, early 19th century. National Historical Museum of Brazil

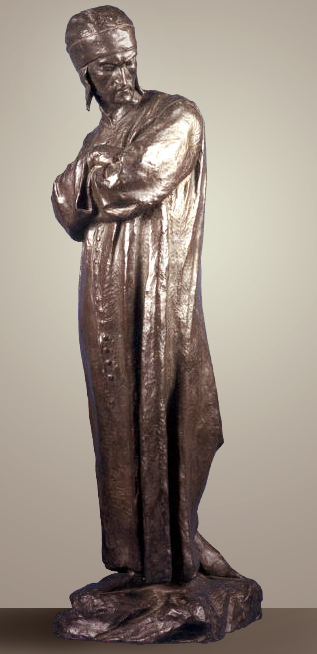
Almeida Reis: Dante returning from exile, 1889. Museu Nacional de Belas Artes

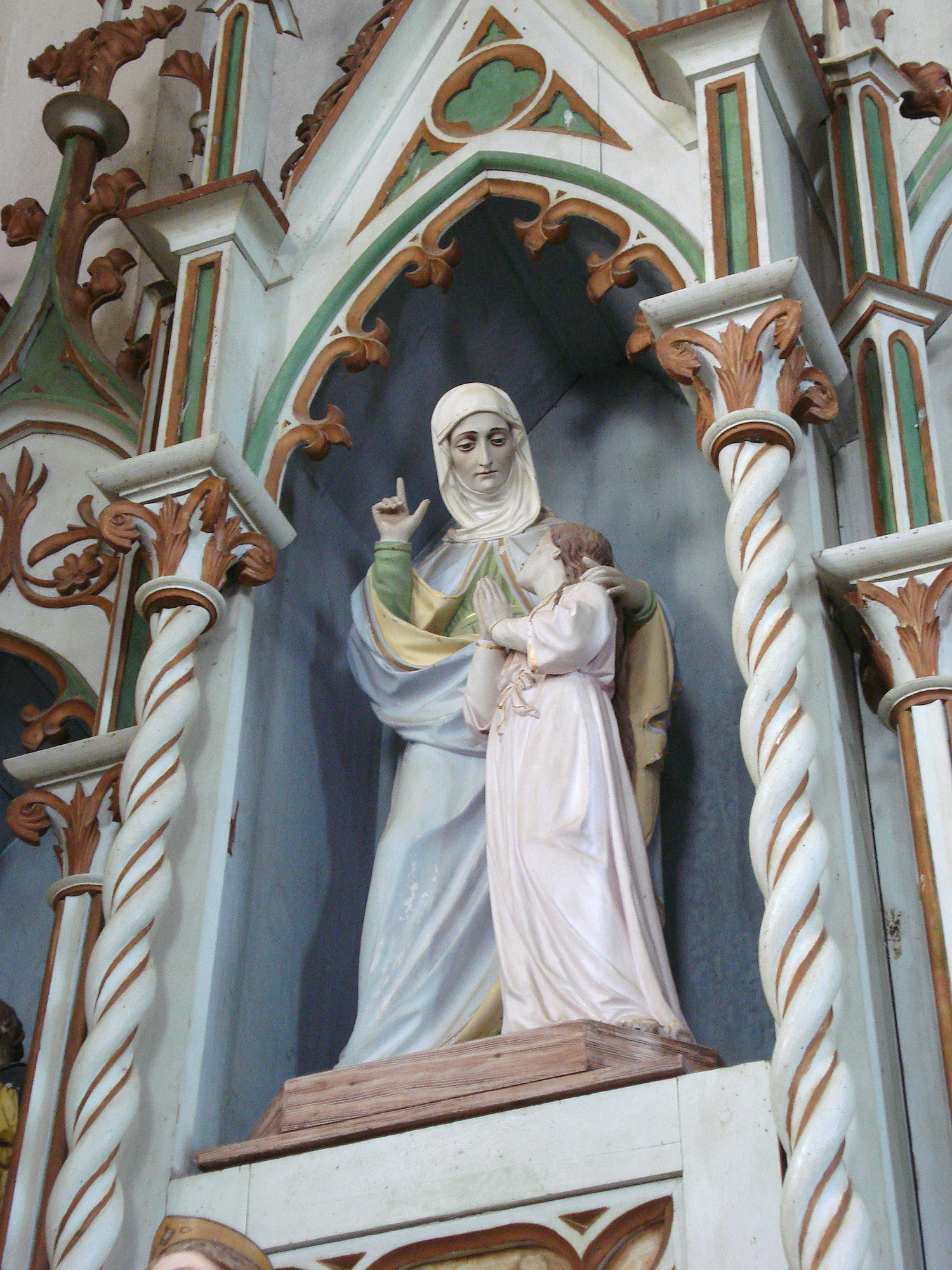
Unknown artist: St. Anne teaching, late 19th century. Our Lady of Caravaggio Sanctuary, Farroupilha

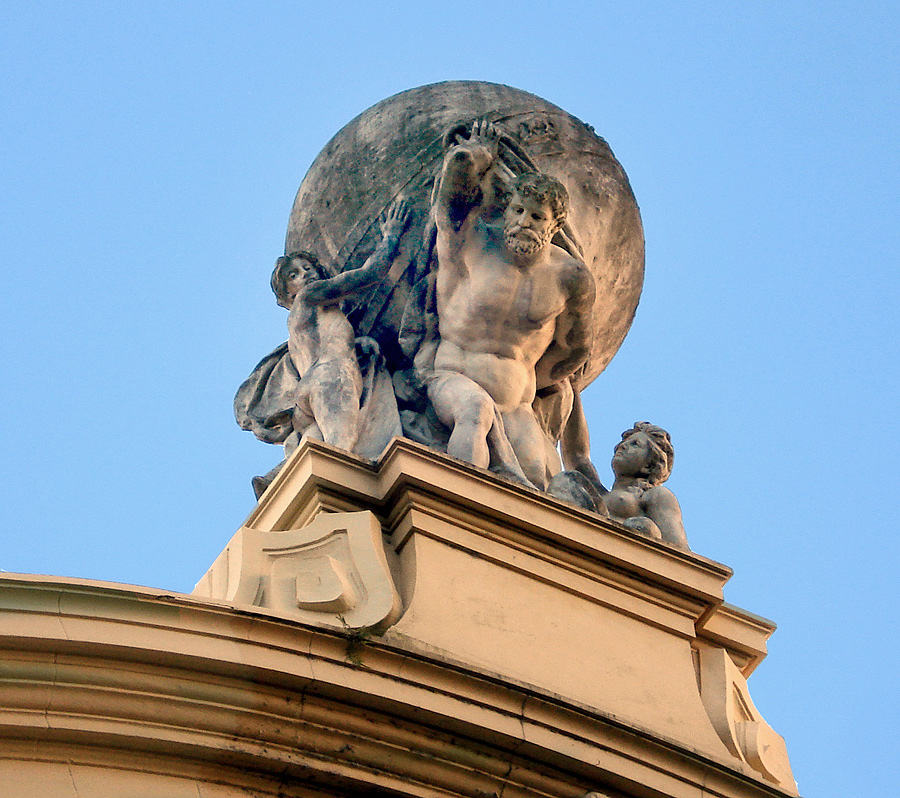
Wenzel Folberger: Atlas, early 20th century, Porto Alegre

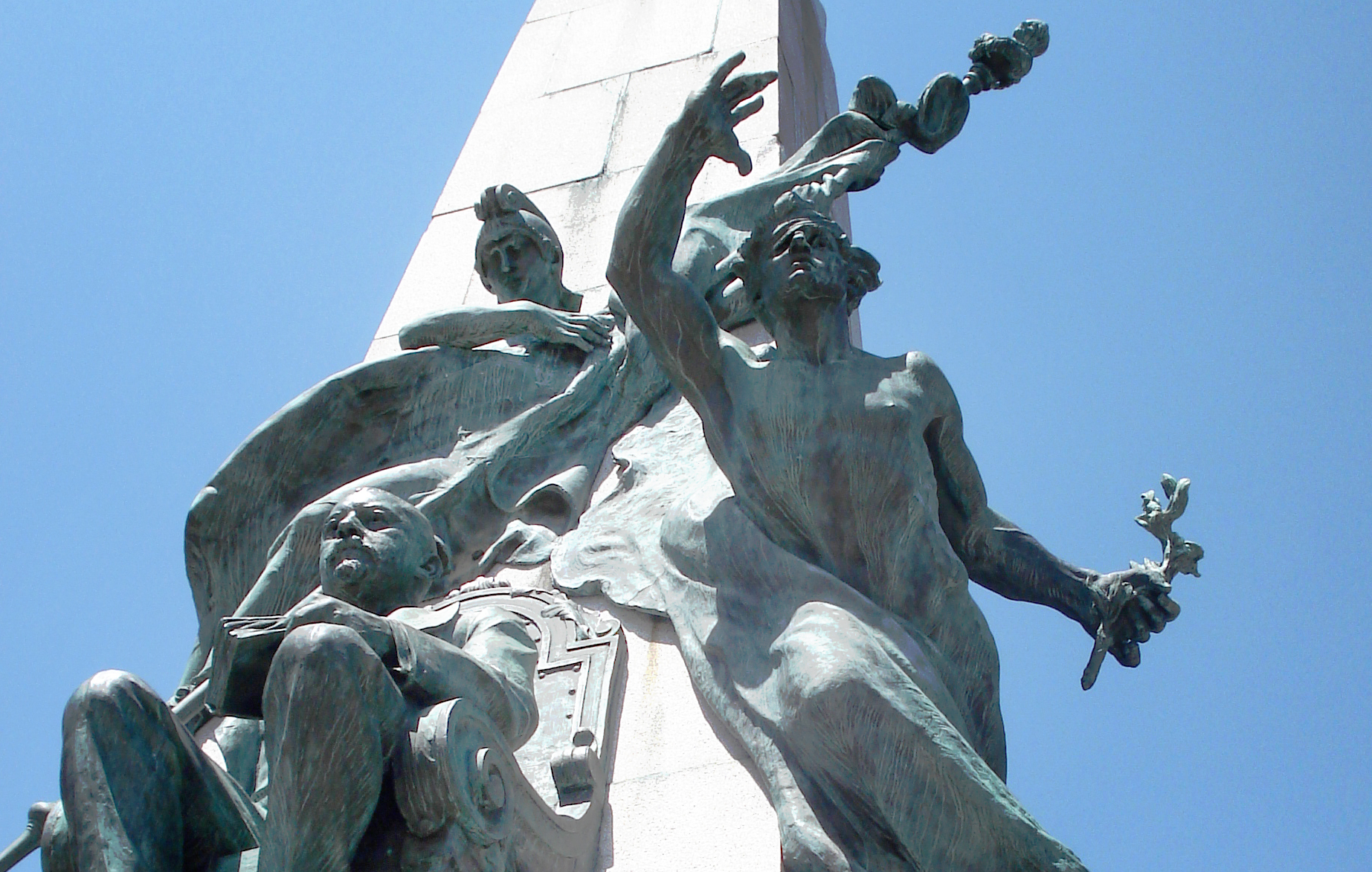
Décio Villares: Detail of Monument to Júlio de Castilhos, c. 1913. Porto Alegre

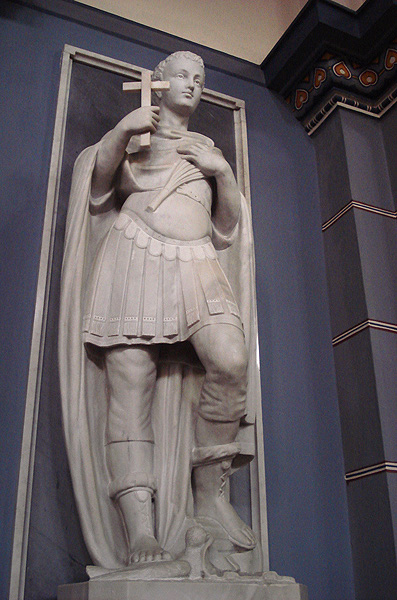
André Arjonas: St. Expeditus, early 20th century

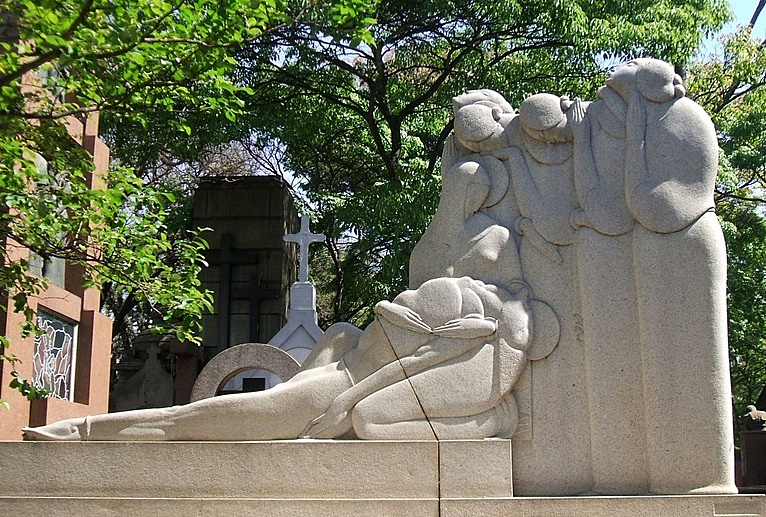
Victor Brecheret: Tomb of Olívia Guedes Penteado, early 20th century. São Paulo

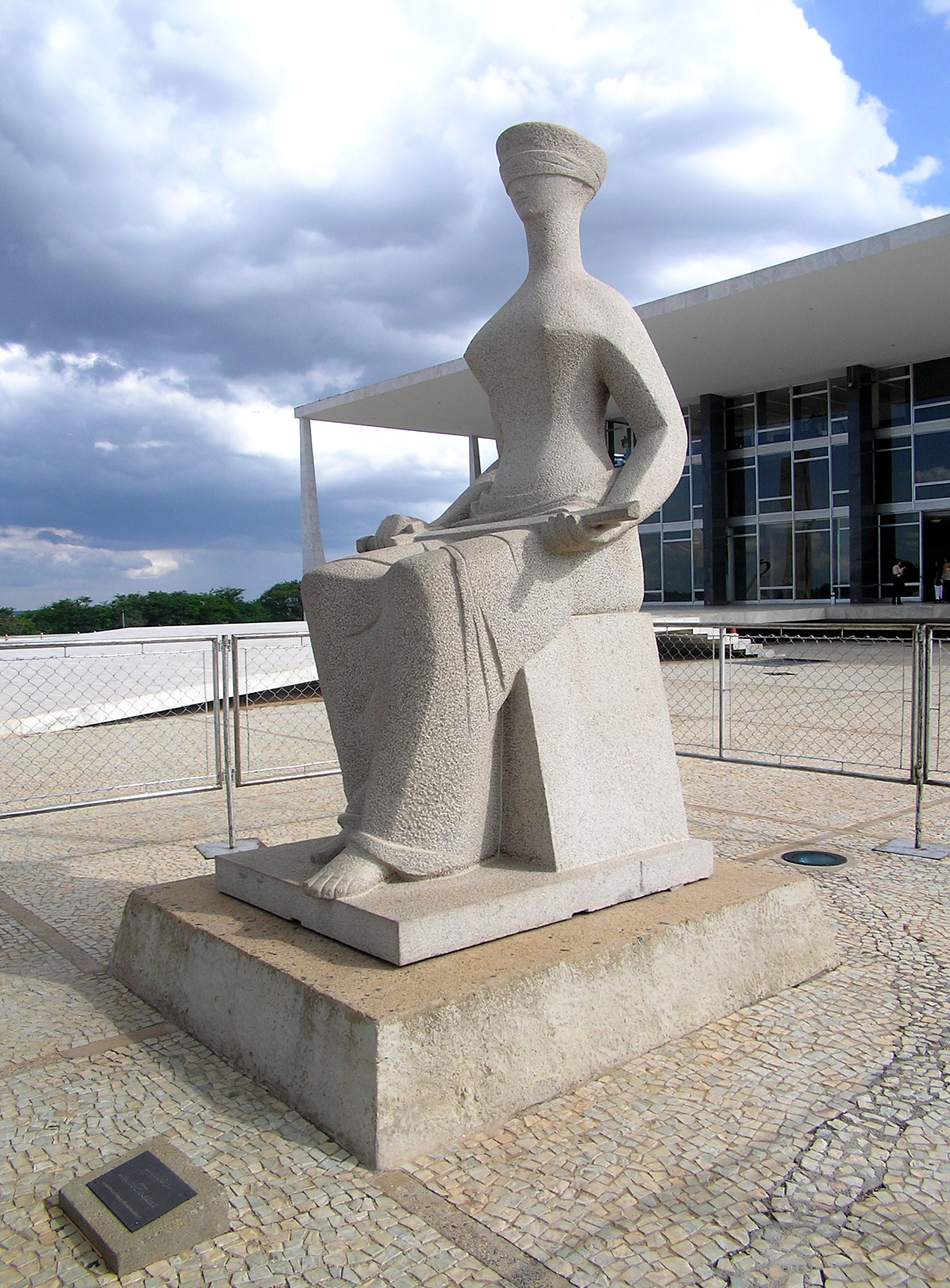
Alfredo Ceschiatti: Justice, Brasília

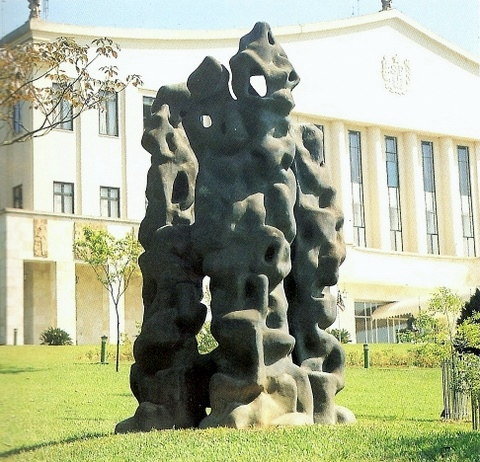
Felícia Leirner: Columns, 1975–76. São Paulo

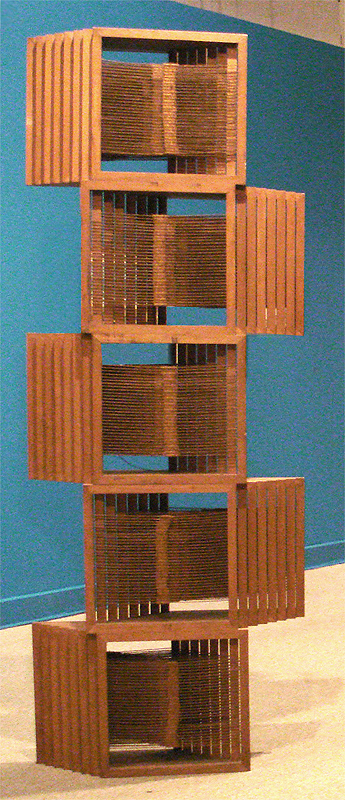
Heloísa Crocco: Echo II, 1978. Rio Grande do Sul Museum of Art

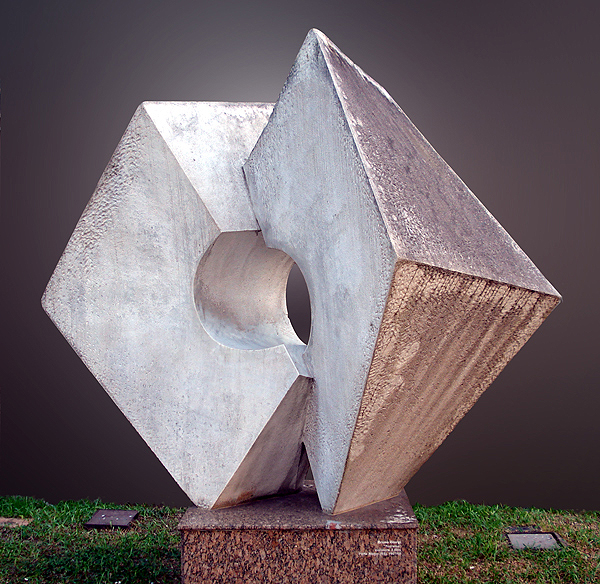
Bruno Giorgi: Theorem, 1987–88. Porto Alegre

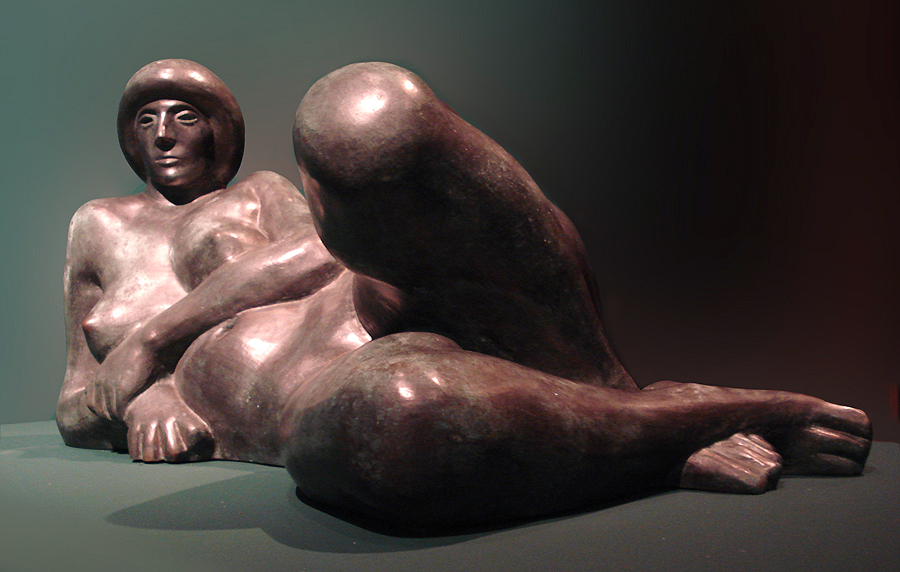
Vasco Prado: Model resting, c. 1990. Rio Grande do Sul Museum of Art

== See also ==
- Brazilian culture
- Namoradeira
