= Leirner =

Leirner is a surname. Notable people with the surname include:

- Felícia Leirner (1904–1996), Polish-born Brazilian sculptor
- Giselda Leirner (born 1928), Brazilian writer, illustrator, and artist
- Jac Leirner (born 1961), Brazilian artist
- Nelson Leirner (1932–2020), Brazilian artist
