= Hércules Barsotti =

Brazilian painter, graphic designer, scenographer and costume designer

- Born: Hércules Rubens Barsotti; July 20, 1914; São Paulo, Brazil
- Died: December 21, 2010 (aged 96); São Paulo, Brazil
- Occupations: Visual artist Graphic designer Stage designer Costume designer
- Years active: 1926-2010
- Known for: Neo-Concrete Movement
- Partner: Willys de Castro

Hércules Rubens Barsotti (July 20, 1914 – December 21, 2010) was a Brazilian painter, graphic designer, scenographer and costume designer. He was a member of the Neo-Concrete Movement.

== Early life and education ==
Barsotti was born in São Paulo, Brazil.

Barsotti studied drawing under Henrique Vio from 1926– 1933 at the Colegio Dante Alighieri in São Paulo. In 1934 he began his studies in Industrial Chemistry at the Mackenzie Institute and receiving his degree in 1937.

== Career ==
Upon graduating from the Mackenzie Institute, Barsotti worked as a Chemist until 1939. Barsotti began to work within abstraction around the beginning of the 1940s.

In the 1950s Barsotti worked as a textile and theater costume designer. At this time he began to come in contact with artists working within the Concrete Art movement in Brazil. Though Barsotti's work in this period was constructivist in nature, he did not join the Concrete group in São Paulo. He separated himself from the movement in São Paulo by avoiding the strict technicisms that came along with concrete art. In 1953 he created his first truly constructive art. Along with Badia Villató, Barsotti designed the scenography for "The Clerk," a mimodrama written by Luís de Lima in conjunction with Students from the Alfredo Mesquita School of Dramatic Arts for which Willys de Castro wrote the musical score.

In 1954 along with his life partner and artist Willys de Castro, Barsotti founded Estúdio de Projectos Gráficos, an advertising design consultancy which operated for a decade.

Along with de Castro, Barsotti traveled to Europe in 1958 where they studied for one year. During this time in Europe Barsotti met the Swiss artist Max Bill, a leading theorist of concrete art. After returning to São Paulo in 1959 both de Castro and Barsotti joined the Neo-Concrete Movement. Barsotti's first exhibition as part of the Neo-Concrete Movement was at the V Bienal Internacional de Arte de São Paulo in which he was awarded First Prize. Similarly, in 1959 he also participated in the São Paulo Modern Art Salon and won the Grand Gold Medal. In 1960 he participated in "Konkrete Kunst" an exhibition organized by Max Bill in Zürich. Further exhibitions included Rio de Janeiro in 1960 and São Paulo in 1961.

In 1963 along with Willys de Castro, Waldemar Cordeiro, and other artists, Barsotti co-founded the São Paulo based art gallery Associação de Artes Visuais Novas Tendências which operated for three years. Although Associação de Artes Visuais Novas Tendências was founded and managed by artists working within the Concrete and Neo-Concrete movements they meant to provide a space and platform for contemporary art to be presented free from the confines of formalities in specific artistic movements.

In 1963 Barsotti abandoned his exploration of simple black and white compositions which he had explored earlier in his career and began to experiment with color and its effects on volume and movement.

== Artwork ==
As he started his work as an artist in the 1950s, he drew two-dimensional art that was usually black and white. These drawings used geometric shapes and lines that were mostly mathematical and technical. He exemplified formal elements related to the Neo-Concrete movement. Although technical is his own right, he was not affiliated with the Concretist group, and he created his own forms of art. His areas of expression is what separated him from the Concrete movement into the neo-concrete movement, but since he generally used formal and somewhat rigid geometric lines and shapes, he was considered part of the Neo-Concrete movement.

In the 1950s, he created many pieces of art with ink on paper that utilize lines to create aesthetically pleasing angles and space in his artwork. In 1970, he drew Estudos e Formas com los Angulos Cor I, which was drawn with pencil on paper. This includes geometric shapes, specifically what appears to be diagonal squares with lines connecting the top and bottom corners. This artwork came with his slight change in style in the 1960s to use monochromatic planes, which were toned-down with some geometric inflections. Another aspect of change in the 1960s was his exploration of colors with different formats. He started to use various geometric shapes in rhythmic sequences to explore different areas of space in his drawings. As an act to counter the Concrete movement, he used colors that was specifically rejected in the Concrete movement. This was a significant way that many of the Neo-Concrete movement artists used to express themselves uniquely in a way that set them apart from the Concrete movement.

Many of Barsotti's later artwork presented as acrylic paint on a shaped canvas. These canvases would be in the form of simple shapes, such as a circle, square or triangle. Each have two shades of the same color with a slit in the middle. These particular paintings were a part of Colección Patricia Phelps de Cisneros and made in 1996.

== Selected exhibitions ==
Solo exhibitions

- 1974: Obras recentes, Galeria Arte Global (São Paulo, Brazil)
- 1981: Gabinete de Arte Raquel Arnaud Babenco (São Paulo, Brazil)
- 1988: "Aventuras da ordem: Hércules Barsotti e Willys de Castro," Gabinete de Arte Raquel Arnaud Babenco (São Paulo, Brazil)
- 1994: Desenhos, 1953– 1960, Galeria Silvio Nery (São Paulo, Brazil)
- 2000: Museu de Arte Moderna (São Paulo, Brazil)

Group exhibitions

- 1959: V Bienal Internacional de Arte de São Paulo (São Paulo, Brazil)
- 1960: "Konkrete Kunst: 50 Jahre Entwicklung" (Zürich, Switzerland) – traveling exhibition, June 8 – August 14, 1960
- 1977: "Projecto construtivo brasileiro na arte. 1950 – 1962," Museum of Modern Art, Rio de Janeiro (Rio de Janeiro, Brazil); Pinacoteca do Estado de São Paulo (São Paulo, Brazil)
- 1984: "Tradição e ruptura. Síntese de arte e cultura brasileras," Fundação Bienal de São Paulo (São Paulo, Brazil)
- 1987: XIX Bienal Internacional de Arte de São Paulo (São Paulo, Brazil)
- 2000: Heterotopías. Media siglo sin lugar. 1918–1968, Museo Nacional Centro de Arte Reina Sofía (Madrid)
- 2000: Século 20. Arte do Brasil, Fundação Calouste Gulbenkian, Centro de Arte Moderna José de Azeredo Perdigão (Lisbon)
- 2003: Cuasi-corpus. Arte concreto y neoconcreto de Brasil, Museo de Arte Contemporáneo Internacional Rufino Tamayo (Mexico City)
- 2004: Inverted Utopias. Avant-Garde Art in Latin America, Museum of Fine Arts Houston (Houston, Texas)
- 2006: Cruce de Miradas. Visiones de America Latina. Colección Patricia Phelps de Cisneros, Museo Palacio de Bellas Artes (Mexico City)
- 2006: The Sites of Latin American Abstraction. Cisneros Fontanals Art Foundation (Miami, Florida) [Traveling exhibition]
- 2007: Geometry of Hope. Latin American Abstract Art from the Patricia Phelps de Cisneros Collection. Blanton Museum of Art, The University of Texas Austin (Austin, Texas); Grey Art Gallery, New York University (New York)
- 2010: Das Verlangen nach Form– O Desejo da Forma. Neoconcretismo und zeitgenössische Kunst aus Brasilien, Akademie der Künste (Berlin, Germany)
- 2010: Vibración. Moderne Kunst aus Lateinamerika. The Ella Fontanals-Cisneros Collection Bundeskunsthalle (Bonn, Germany)

== Selected works ==
- Drawing No. 1 at the Museum of Modern Art (1958)
- Ink Drawing at the Museum of Modern Art (1960)
- Ink Drawing at the Museum of Modern Art (1960)
- Ink Drawing at the Museum of Modern Art (1960)
- Ink Drawing at the Museum of Modern Art (1960)
- Ink Drawing at the Museum of Modern Art (1960)
- Ink Drawing at the Museum of Modern Art (1960)
- Ink Drawing at the Museum of Modern Art (1960)
- Ink Drawing at the Museum of Modern Art (1960)
- Ink Drawing at the Museum of Modern Art (1960)
- Ink Drawing at the Museum of Modern Art (1960)
- Ink Drawing at the Museum of Modern Art (1960)
- Ink Drawing at the Museum of Modern Art (1960)
- White/White at the Museum of Modern Art (1961)
- Untitled at the Museum of Modern Art (1962)
