= Giselda =

Giselda is a given name. Notable people with the name include:

- Giselda Leirner (born 1928), Brazilian writer, illustrator, and artist
- Giselda Volodi (born 1959), Italian actress
- Giselda Zani (1909–1975), Uruguayan poet, short story writer, and art critic

== See also ==
- Griselda
