= Willys de Castro =

Brazilian visual artist, poet, designer and magazine editor

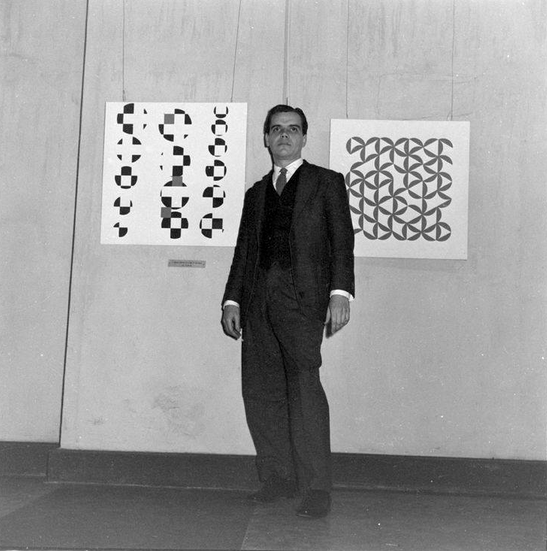
- Willys de Castro in front of two of his paintings at the VI National Salon of Modern Art in Rio de Janeiro, Brazil in 1957.
- Born: February 16, 1926; Uberlândia, Minas Gerais, Brazil
- Died: June 5, 1988 (aged 62); São Paulo, Brazil
- Other name: Souza Castro
- Occupations: Visual artist poet graphic designer industrial designer stage designer magazine editor
- Years active: 1950–1988
- Known for: Neo-Concrete Movement
- Partner: Hércules Barsotti

Willys de Castro (February 16, 1926 – June 5, 1988) was a Brazilian visual artist, poet, graphic designer, industrial designer, stage designer and magazine editor. De Castro is best known for his "Active object" series and is considered to be a pioneer and founding contributor of the Neo-Concrete Movement.

== Early life and education ==
De Castro was born in Uberlândia, Minas Gerais, Brazil. He was the second of six children born to Henrique de Castro and Cacilda de Souza Castro. His father was a businessman who owned a gas station, a used car dealership, and a perfumery in Uberlândia.

De Castro began to show an interest in the arts at a very early age and began to study the piano at the age of four. In the mid 1930s de Castro's family relocated from Uberlândia to Campinas, São Paulo after a fire destroyed the family perfumery. In Campinas de Castro studied music with Salvador Bove. During this time he also studied drawing under André Fort.

In 1941, when he was fifteen years old, de Castro moved to São Paulo to study Chemistry and Industrial design. From 1944 to 1945, he worked as a technical draftsman. In 1948, de Castro received a degree in Industrial Chemistry. For a brief period upon graduation de Castro worked as an industrial chemist for Esso but left his position to pursue his artistic interests.

== Career ==
After leaving Esso to focus on music and graphic arts de Castro began to study dodecaphonic music with Hans-Joachim Koellreutter. De Castro created his first geometric abstract drawings in 1950 and for the rest of the first half of the 1950s continued to create paintings and textiles inspired by abstract art. During this time de Castro signed his music compositions and graphic artworks using the pseudonym "Souza Castro."

In 1952 de Castro began to work at the Alfredo Mesquita School of Dramatic Arts where he served as composer, singer, poet, and graphic designer. That same year some of de Castro's original musical compositions were performed at the Institute Caetano de Campos. The following year he composed the musical score for "The Clerk," a mimodrama produced by the students of the Alfredo Mesquita School of Dramatic Arts. That same year de Castro created his first concrete art works.

In 1954 together with his life partner and fellow artist Hércules Barsotti, de Castro founded Estúdio de Projectos Gráficos, an advertising design consultancy. While working at Estúdio de Projectos Gráficos, which operated until 1964, de Castro focused on graphic design as well as object design.

In 1954 de Castro was a founding member of the Brazilian musical group "Ars Nova." Under the direction of Diogo Pacheco Ars Nova focused on circulating obscure medieval and contemporary musical compositions. De Castro sang baritone and acted as the graphic designer for the group. During this time de Castro began creating concrete poetry and in 1955 published a book of his concrete poems.

De Castro was designer and director of the Brazilian theater magazine "Teatro brasileiro."

De Castro curated several group exhibitions and solo exhibitions including a retrospective of Aldo Bonadei's work at the São Paulo Museum of Modern Art in 1955.

De Castro was honored in 1957 by the Associação Paulista de Críticos de Arte for his scenography and costume design work at the Artistic Culture Theater.

Upon his return from studying in Europe for one year (1958–1959), de Castro joined the Neo-Concrete Movement in Rio de Janeiro along with Lygia Clark, Hélio Oiticica, Franz Weissmann, Lygia Pape and others. The following year de Castro participated in "Konkrete Kunst" an exhibit organized in Zürich by Max Bill.

From 1959 to 1962, de Castro developed his "Active object" series.

In 1963 together with Hércules Barsotti, Lothar Charoux, Waldemar Cordeiro, Luiz Sacilotto among others, De Castro became one of the founders of the São Paulo based art gallery Associação de Artes Visuais Novas Tendências which operated until 1965. Associação de Artes Visuais Novas Tendências was founded and managed by artists working within the Concrete and Neo-Concrete movements but did not solely feature Concrete and Neo-Concrete art. The galleries goal was to provide a space and platform for contemporary art to be presented outside the confines of any particular artistic movement.

De Castro is also noted for his series of works titled "Pluriobjetos" which he began in 1970. De Castro's "Pluriobjetos" were first exhibited in 1983 at Gabinete de Artes Gráficas Raquel Arnaud Babenco in São Paulo.

== Selected exhibitions ==
Solo exhibitions

- 1983: Gabinete de Arte Raquel Arnaud Babenco (São Paulo, Brazil)
- 1988: "Aventuras da ordem: Hércules Barsotti e Willys de Castro," Gabinete de Arte Raquel Arnaud Babenco (São Paulo, Brazil)
- 1994: Obras de 1954 – 1961, Galeria Silvio Nery (São Paulo, Brazil)
- 2000: "Mira Schendel, Sergio Camargo, Willys de Castro," Centro Cultural Banco do Brasil (Rio de Janeiro, Brazil)
- 2006: "Rhythm of Color. Alejandro Otero and Willys de Castro. Two Modern Masters in the Colección Patricia Phelps de Cisneros," Aspen Institute (Aspen, Colorado)
- 2009: "Desenho e Design: Amilcar de Castro e Willys de Castro," Instituto de Arte Contemporânea (São Paulo, Brazil)
- 2016: "Willys de Castro: From paintings to objects 1950–1965," Cecilia Brunson Projects (London, England) – October 8 – December 9, 2016

Group exhibitions

- 1957: São Paulo Art Biennial / IV Bienal Internacional de Arte de São Paulo (São Paulo, Brazil)
- 1960: "Konkrete Kunst: 50 Jahre Entwicklung" (Zurich, Austria) – traveling exhibition, June 8 – August 14, 1960
- 1961: São Paulo Art Biennial / VI Bienal Internacional de Arte de São Paulo (São Paulo, Brazil)
- 1973: São Paulo Art Biennial / XII Bienal Internacional de Arte de São Paulo (São Paulo, Brazil)
- 1977: "Projecto construtivo brasileiro na arte. 1950 – 1962," Museum of Modern Art, Rio de Janeiro (Rio de Janeiro, Brazil); Pinacoteca do Estado de São Paulo (São Paulo, Brazil)
- 1984: "Tradição e ruptura. Síntese de arte e cultura brasileras," Fundação Bienal de São Paulo (São Paulo, Brazil)
- 1994: São Paulo Art Biennial / Bienal Brasil Século XX (São Paulo, Brazil)
- 1998: Arte Construtiva no Brasil (São Paulo, Brazil)

== Selected works ==
- Modulated Composition at the Museum of Modern Art (1954)
- Untitled at the Museum of Modern Art (c. 1956)
- Poster – poem at the Museum of Modern Art (1958)
- Untitled at the Museum of Modern Art (c. 1958)
- Active Object (Yellow) at the Museum of Modern Art (1959–60)
- Active Object at the Museum of Modern Art (1961)
- Active Object at the Museum of Modern Art (1961)
- Active Object at the Museum of Modern Art (1961)
- Active Object (Red/White Cube) at the Museum of Modern Art (1962)
- Untitled at the Museum of Modern Art (1962)
- Untitled at the Museum of Modern Art (1962)
- Pluriobjeto at the Museum of Modern Art (1980)
