= Namoradeira =

Popular sculpture type of Minas Gerais, Brazil

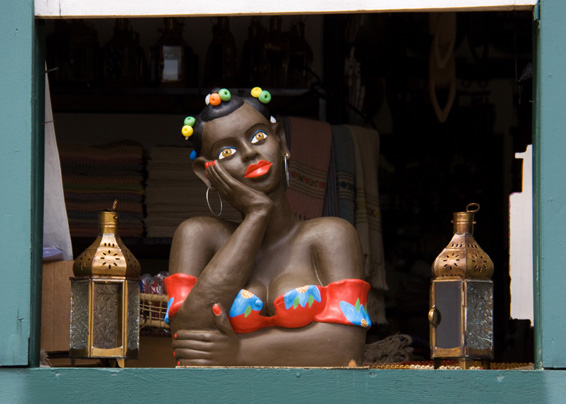
Namoradeira in a window, located in the city of Tiradentes.

Namoradeira (sweethearts) is the name given to a type of a popular sculpture in the state of Minas Gerais, Brazil. The name, "namoradeira", literally means a "girl who dates", a "dating nut", or it can be better translated from Portuguese as "sweetheart". It can be found in many different sizes and materials, such as wood, ceramics, plaster and resin.

They stand with one arm resting horizontally and the other holding a hand to their face. They are mostly seen decorating sills of windows and balconies. They seem to look at infinity, as if they were waiting for time to pass or for their boyfriends, hence the name "namoradeiras", or "sweethearts".
