= Old Sanctuary of Our Lady of Caravaggio =

Catholic temple in Farroupilha, Brazil

Coordinates: 29.1734°S 51.3460°W

- Antigo Santuário de Nossa Senhora de Caravaggio
- Old Mother Church; Chapel of Ex-Votos
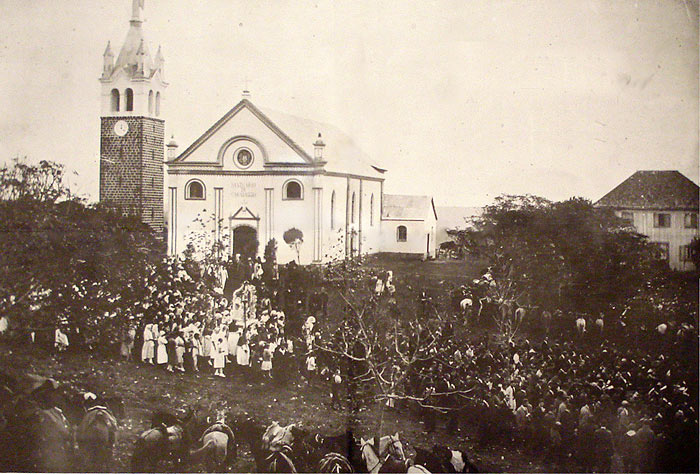
- The chapel at the beginning of the 20th century
- Old Sanctuary of Our Lady of Caravaggio
- Location: Farroupilha, Rio Grande do Sul; Brazil

Architecture
- Completed: 1895

Administration
- Archdiocese: Roman Catholic Diocese of Caxias do Sul

The Old Sanctuary of Our Lady of Caravaggio (Portuguese: Antigo Santuário de Nossa Senhora de Caravaggio), also known as the Old Mother Church (Matriz Antiga) or the Chapel of Ex-Votos (Capela dos Ex-Votos), is located inside the current Sanctuary of Our Lady of Caravaggio, in the Brazilian city of Farroupilha, in the state of Rio Grande do Sul. It was the center of devotion to Our Lady of Caravaggio in the state until the 1960s. In 2006, it was declared a state heritage site due to the historical, cultural and social importance of the site.

== History ==
The first place of worship dedicated to Our Lady of Caravaggio in the old Linha Palmeiro, formerly part of the Dona Isabel Colony (currently Bento Gonçalves), was a 12 square meter wooden chapel with a small porch at the entrance built by immigrants Antônio Franceschet and Pasqual Pasa due to the lack of a temple in the area, which forced them to hold services inside their homes. After it was finished, donations allowed the space to be extended to accommodate 100 people.

The venerated image was an engraving of Our Lady of Loreto brought from Italy in 1876 by Natal Faoro and lent by him to the community. In 1885, a statue of the Virgin of Caravaggio was acquired from the Italian sculptor Pietro Stangherlin, who lived in Caxias do Sul. It was brought from Caxias in procession and, since then, a tradition of pilgrimages to the chapel has developed. Later, the community gathered to build a masonry church and pottery was improvised to manufacture the bricks for the structure of the temple, while the carved stone remained for the adjoining bell tower. The building was inaugurated in 1890. In 1900, the bell tower clock, built by Augusto Rombaldi, was installed.

On May 26, 1921, the parish received the status of a diocesan shrine and a permanent secular clergy to attend worship and organize pilgrimages. In 1959, Our Lady of Caravaggio was declared patroness of the Diocese of Caxias do Sul. After 1963, the temple, unable to accommodate the influx of devotees, transferred its status as a parish church to the building next door, which had a capacity for around 2,000 people.

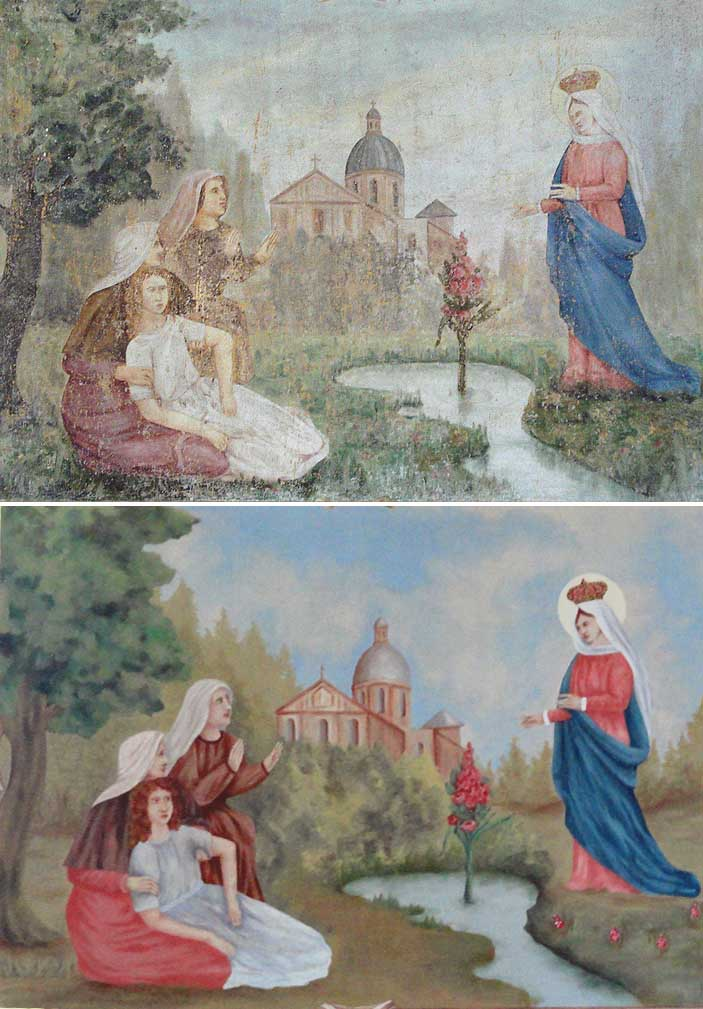
Antonio Cremonese: Miracle of Our Lady of Caravaggio before and after the restorer's intervention.

Currently, the shrine gathers around 140 families and seven subordinate chapels. In 2006, it was listed as a landmark site by the Historical and Artistic Heritage Institute of the State of Rio Grande do Sul (Instituto do Patrimônio Histórico e Artístico do Estado do Rio Grande do Sul - IPHAE), along with the rest of the sanctuary complex, due to its importance to history, art and culture. Between 2005 and 2012, the chapel underwent restoration work led by Marinês Gallon. The result was criticized as disastrous by Ricardo Frantz, the former coordinator of the Rio Grande do Sul Museum of Art collection:

Restoration, unlike what was done here, is a process based on respect for the original work, in which its distinctive characteristics are kept exactly as they are so that they can say what they have to say, fulfilling their role as an authentic and legible document, without entirely arbitrary interventions like this one, which falsify what they claim to preserve. [...] The entire texture of the paintings has been altered, countless details have been added, others removed, the colors have changed their tones, the volumes and contours have changed. [...] In fact, we're looking at a copy, because all that's really left of the original is the overall composition. The whole effect is that of a new work, even though it resembles the one that originated it. [...] To study art and history on the basis of testimonies that have been tampered with to such an extent is to learn false things that lead to misleading conclusions and nonsense. That's not educating, that's not documenting the facts correctly, that's creating an artificial reality. This distorted knowledge ends up multiplying, creates tradition and becomes a truer history than the authentic truth that we insisted on hiding under layers of 'creative' paint, even though it may have been done with the best of intentions.

In 2012, the process of listing two surrounding areas was launched in order to create a landscape and cultural complex. The main pilgrimage currently attracts between 200,000 and 300,000 faithful and is the largest religious festival in the northeast of Rio Grande do Sul.

== Architectural features ==
=== Facade ===
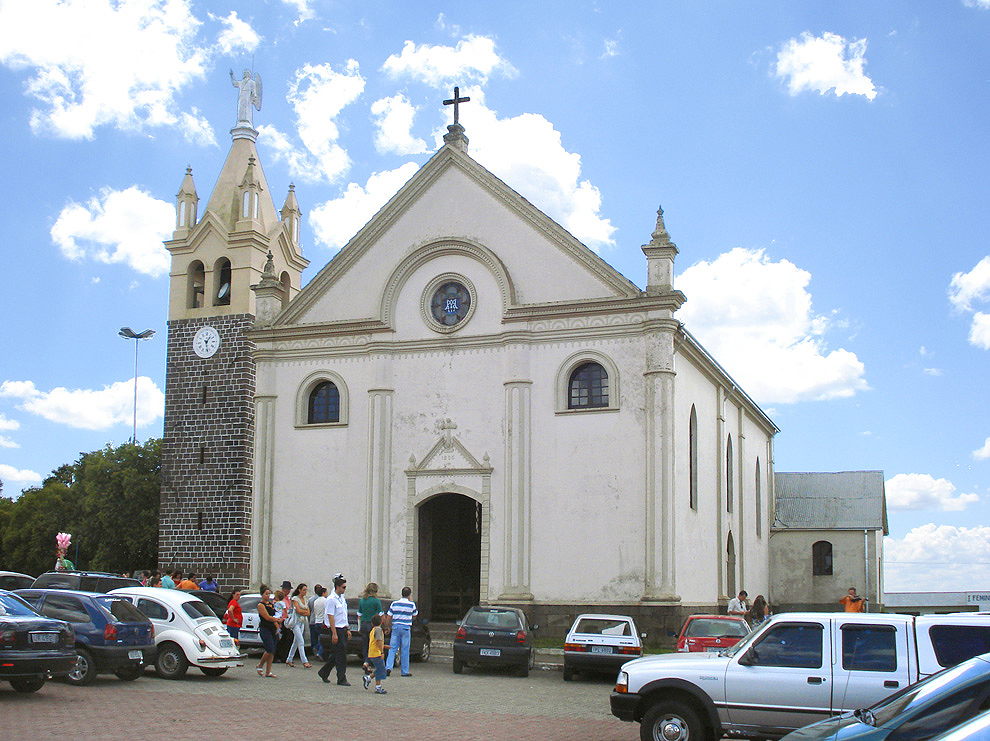
Current aspect.

The chapel has simple architecture with neoclassical and neo-Gothic elements. The facade has a traditional classic triangle-over-square layout raised above a small basement with a single central door and an arched opening. The door has a discreet frontispiece composed of a thin frame in relief imitating carved stone, crowned by a cornice and a pediment with a cross at the top and inscribed 1890, the date of the inauguration. On the side there are two slender circular pilasters with fluting and no capital. In the two side openings, at a high level, there are small round-arched windows with simple frames in relief.

A large triangular pediment sits above the block, separated from the structure below by a cornice adorned with a frieze with a semicircular motif simulating corbels. Another cornice just above, more ornate, extends and outlines the entire pediment, interrupting in a round arch at the base to house an oculus occluded by stained glass. There are two small pinnacles on the corners and a cross on the apex.

=== Interior ===
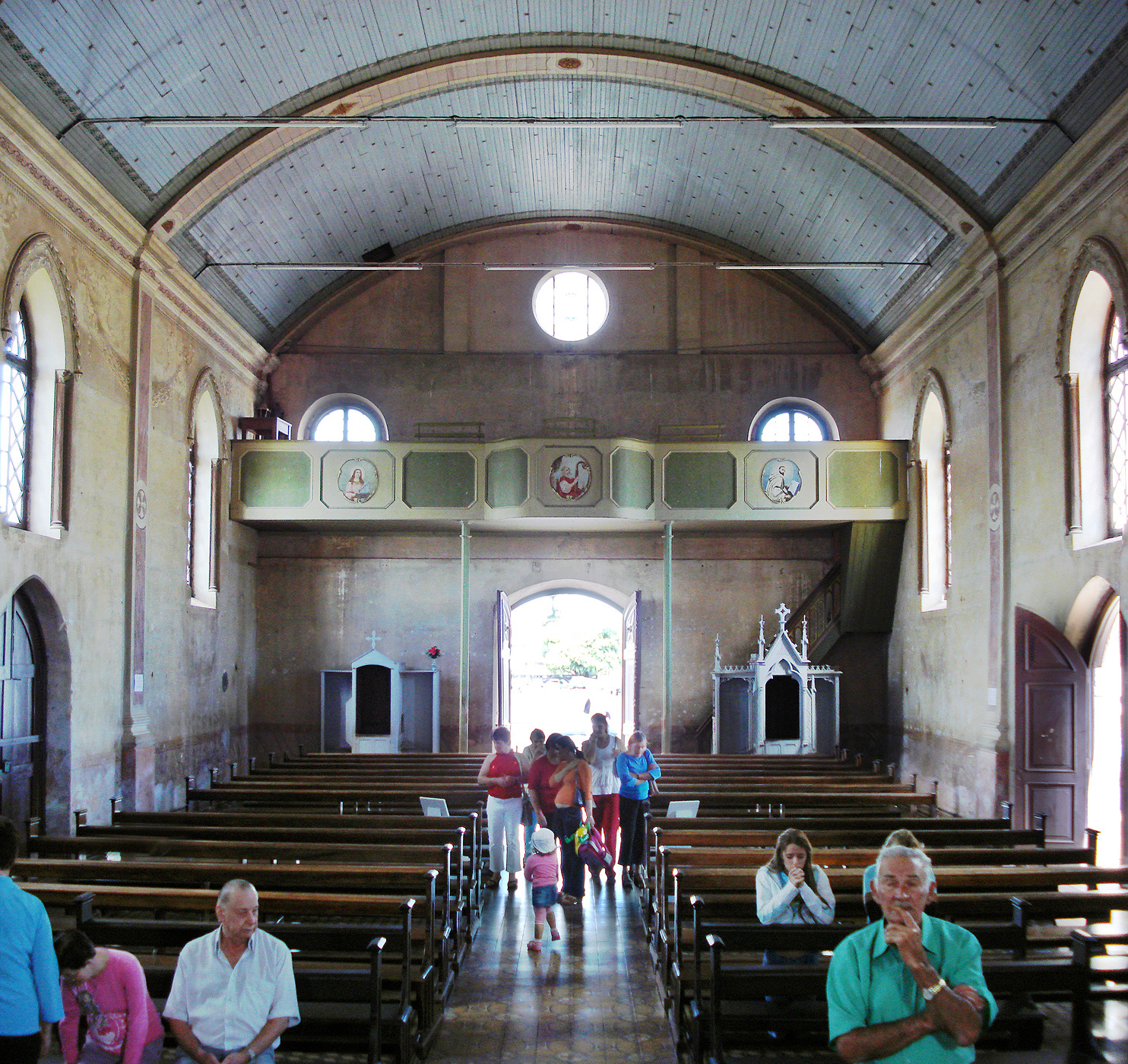
Aspect of the interior facing the entrance.

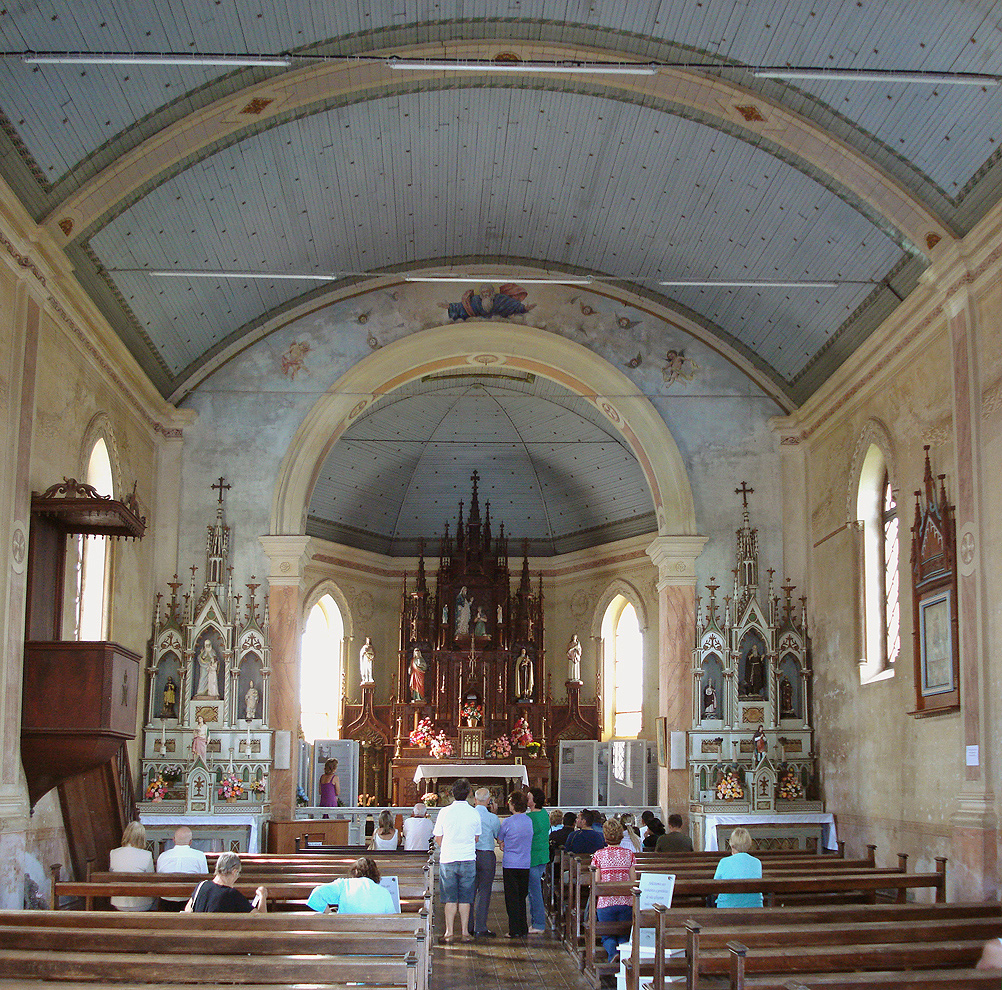
Aspect of the interior.

The interior has a single nave and a chancel at the back with a predominance of the neo-Gothic style. The entrance is located under a wooden choir supported by two slender octagonal columns and decorated with simple paintings (Saint Cecilia, King David with the psaltery and another unidentified saint) in three medallions along the parapet. Also under the choir are two wooden confessionals, one on either side of the entrance.

The nave is lined with ogival windows, side columns and a foliate relief above. The walls are decorated with ornamental paintings by Antônio Cremonese, with trompe-l'oeil garlands at the top and marbled effects on the pilasters and plinths. The barrel vaulted ceiling is made of light blue wood dotted with tiny golden stars and stands on a wide cornice decorated with a frieze in a floral motif. In the middle of the nave, a door opens on each side and on the left is a simple wooden pulpit with a canopy. The benches are also made of wood with discreet carving and the floor is decorated with tiles in various geometric motifs.

There are two neo-Gothic carved altars next to the crossing arch painted white with green and natural wood details, with marbled panels and different images of saints. The one on the left is dedicated to St. Anne and has a rare statue of the Virgin Mary as a baby wrapped in cloths and tied tightly with straps at the base. The altar on the right is in honor of St. Anthony the Abbot, along with other secondary saints. The arch has pilasters decorated with marbled paint and above it is a painted scene with angels and God with open arms appearing between clouds.

The apsidal chancel is separated from the nave by a step and a marble balustrade, opened in the middle by a small metal gate. The main altarpiece is a neo-Gothic wooden construction with several levels, pinnacles with a pierced work and several niches for statues. A pair of images depicting the patroness blessing the kneeling seer Joaneta made by the Atelier Zambelli stands out. At the base of the altarpiece is the celebration table, on a podium with three steps, under which is a scene in relief depicting the Last Supper. Also attached to the altarpiece are rare processional candle holders in worked and painted metal.

There are two murals on the walls of the chancel depicting scenes of healings sponsored by the Virgin of Caravaggio made by Cremonese. The ceiling is a half-dome made of wood with similar decoration to the nave ceiling. On the side are two ogival windows with colored stained glass and doors that lead to the former sacristy, now converted into a storage room for ex-votos, and to a confessional room on the other side. A series of modern panels with images and text were also installed in the chancel as a memorial to the former priests who served the parish. The temple has an audio system that narrates the apparition of the Virgin in Italy, the history of the shrine and its traditions.

=== Bell tower ===
To the left of the church stands a stone belfry with several openings, a clock and a neo-Gothic crown with pinnacles and double openings for the three bells imported from Italy, which, according to tradition, have the power to ward off hailstorms with their ringing. The belfry is topped off by a large figure of an angel blessing the people.

== Gallery ==
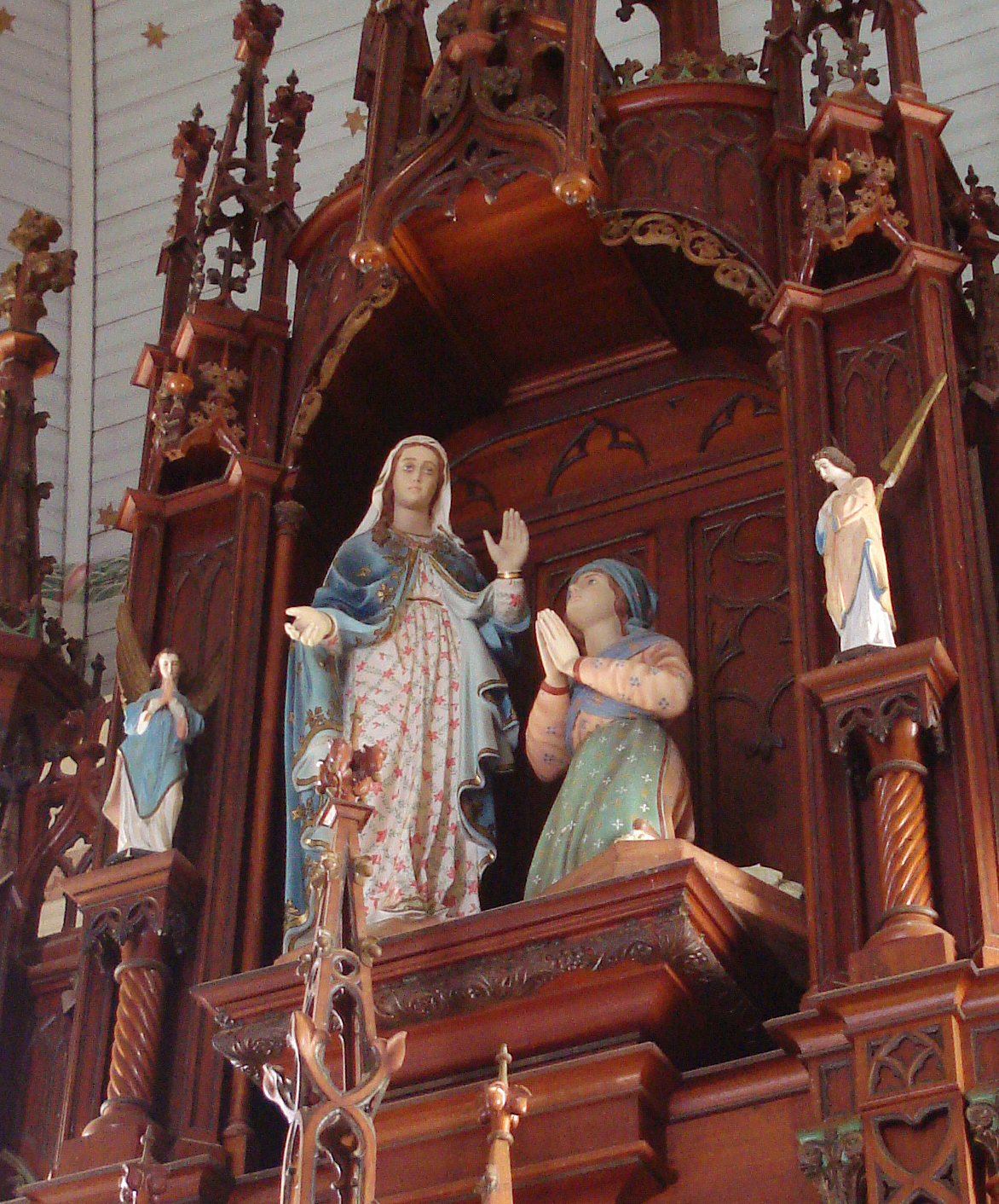
Image of the patron saint on the altarpiece in the chancel.

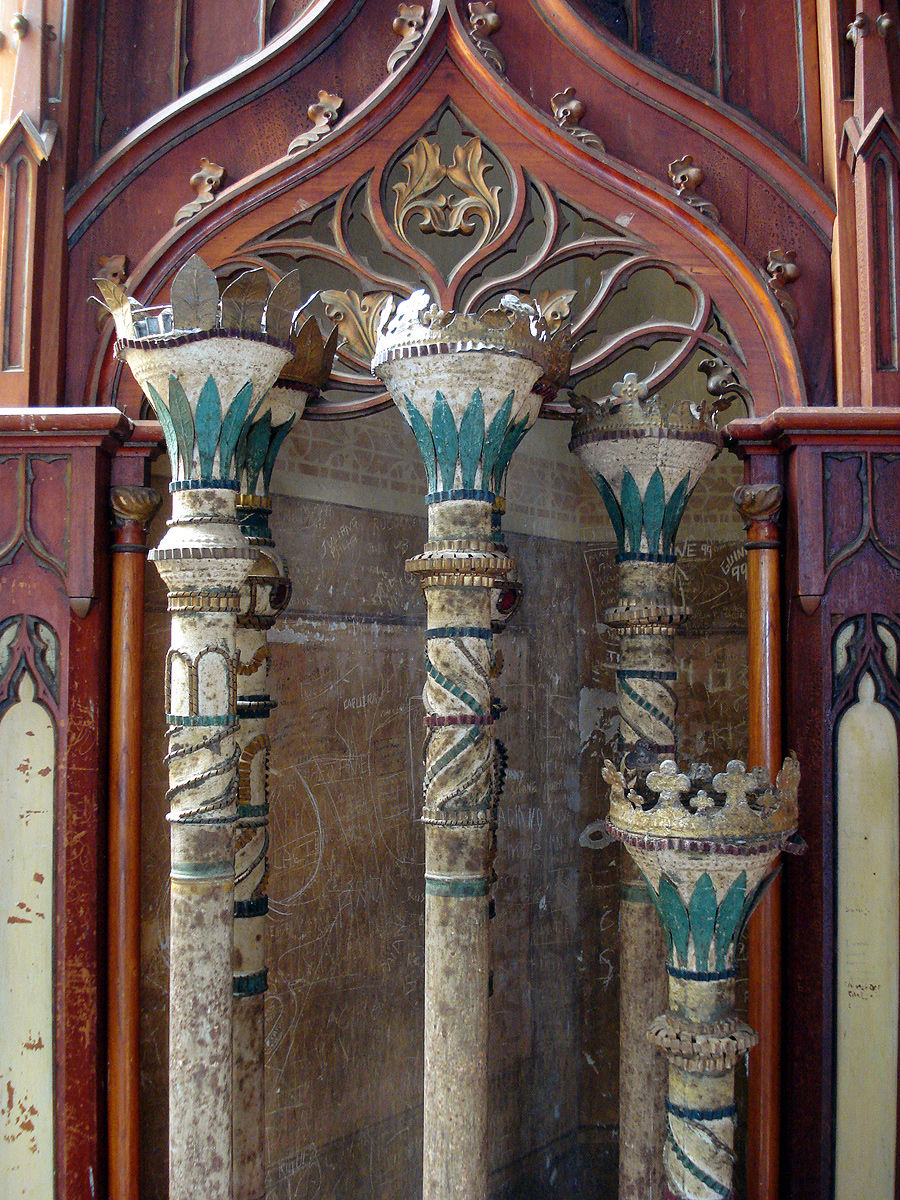
Torchbearers next to the altarpiece in the chancel.

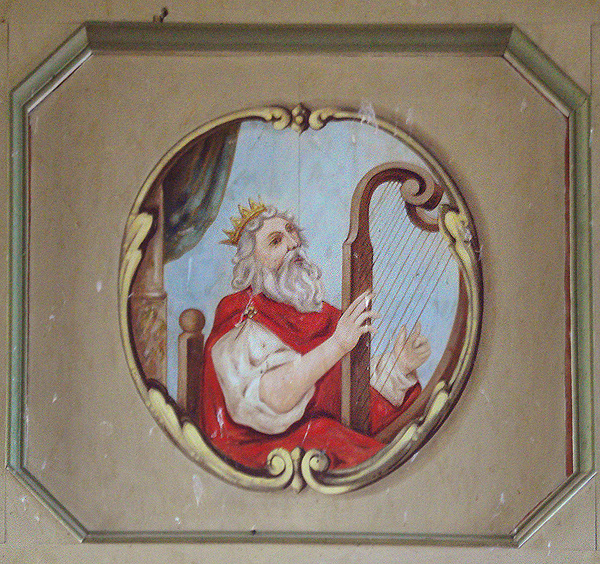
King David with the psaltery, painting in the choir.

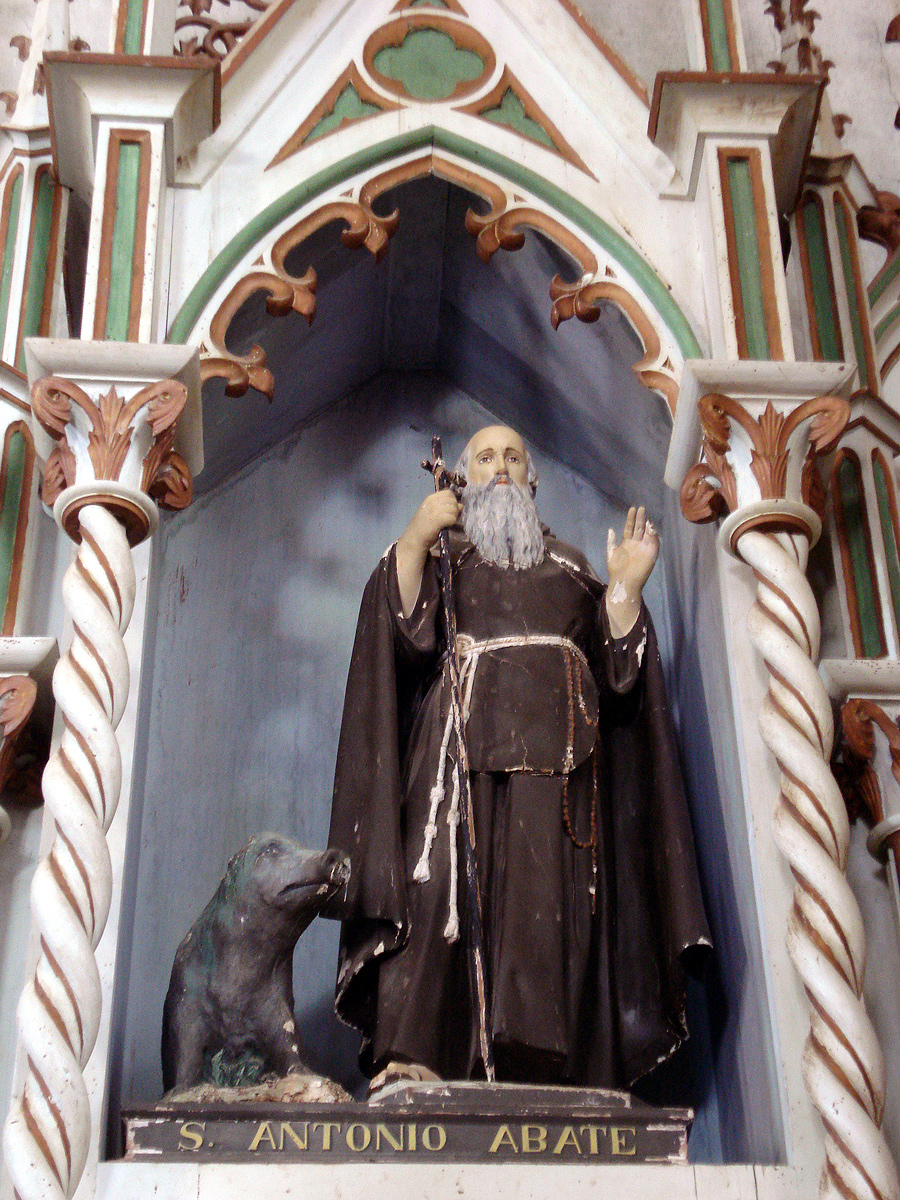
Altar of Saint Anthony the Abbot.
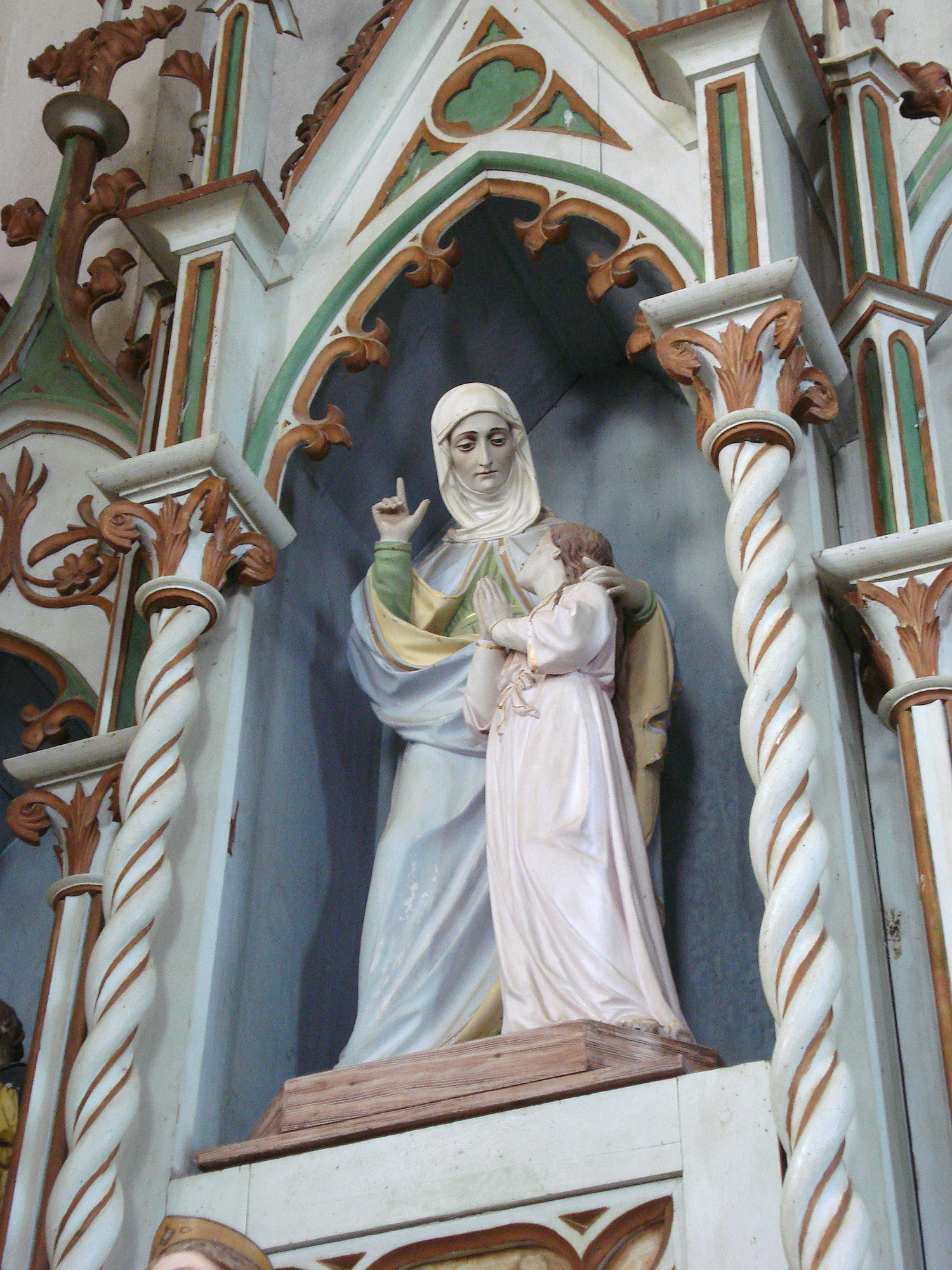
Altar of Saint Anne.

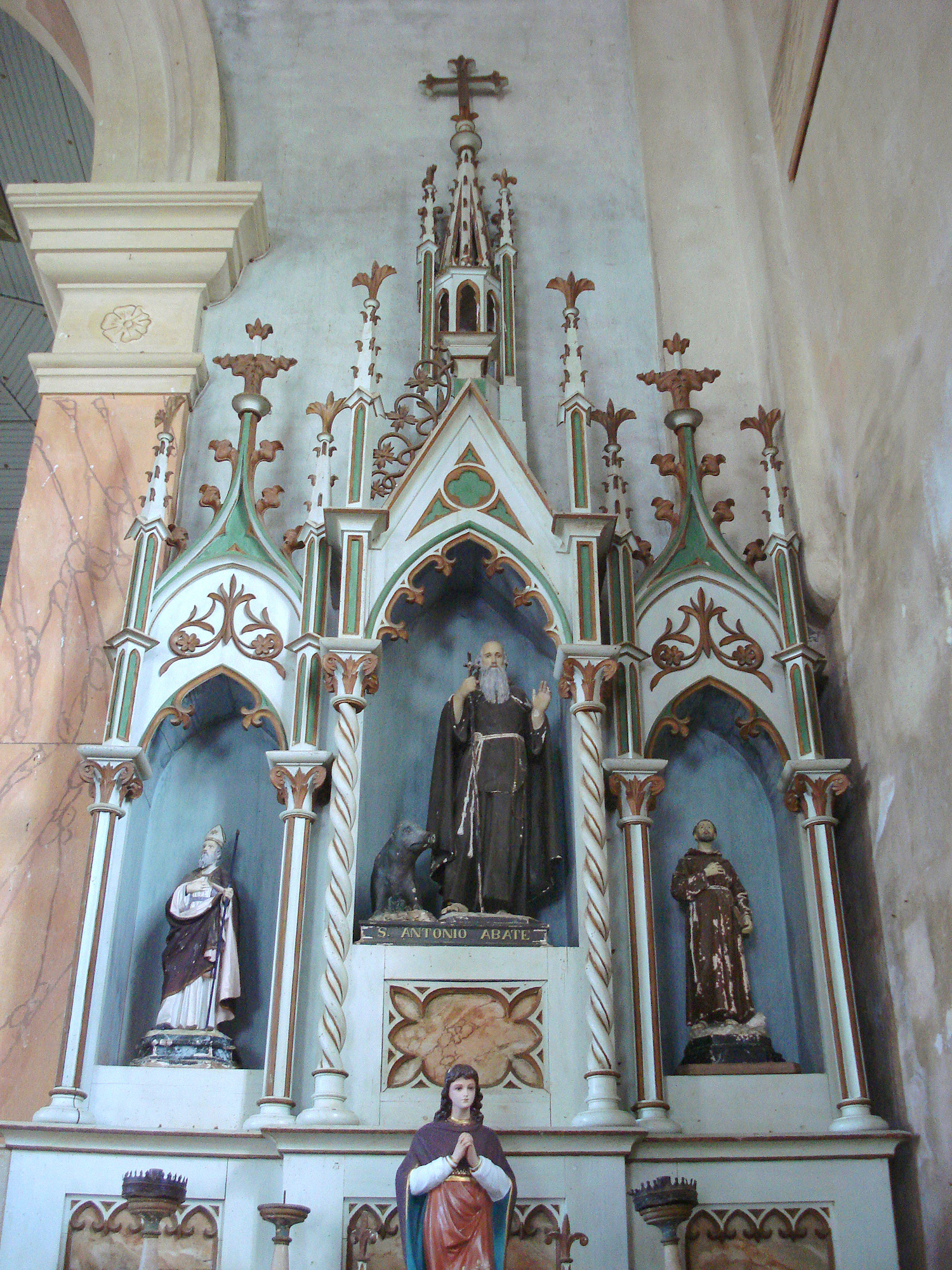
Altar of Saint Anthony the Abbot.

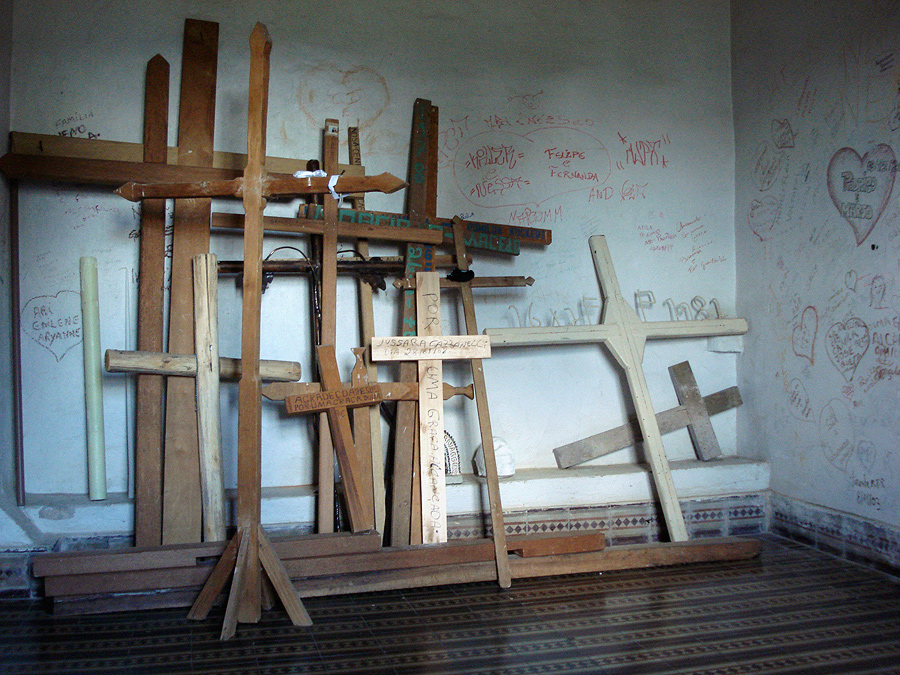
Old sacristy with ex-voto crosses.

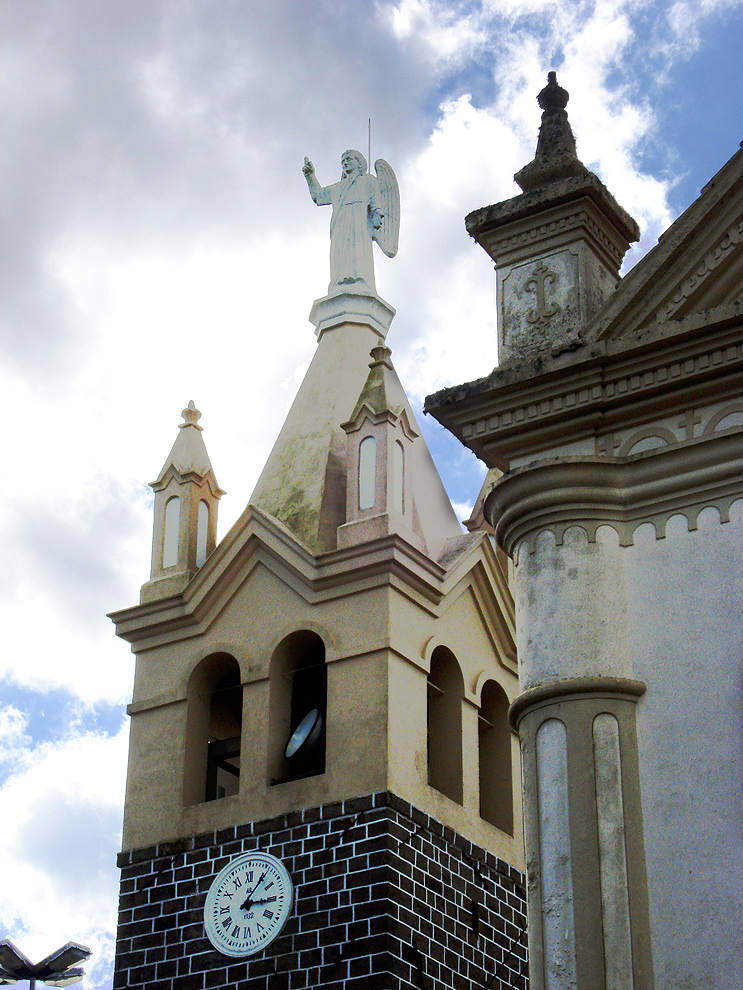
Detail of the bell tower.

== See also ==
- History of Rio Grande do Sul
