= Felícia Leirner =

Polish-born Brazilian sculptor

- Leirner in 1926
- Born: 1904; Warsaw, Poland
- Died: 1996 (aged 91–92); São Paulo, Brazil
- Known for: Sculpture

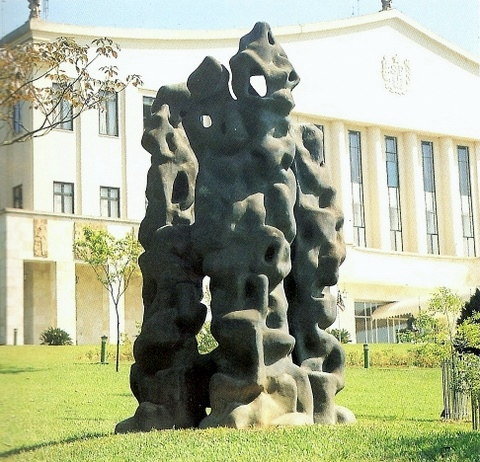
The bronze Colunas (1975–76) by Felícia Leirner

Felícia Leirner (1904–1996) was a Polish-born Brazilian sculptor. She was born in Warsaw and arrived in Brazil in 1927. At the age of 44, she began studying sculpture with the photographer Victor Brecheret . Her early work belonged to the figurative phase (1950–58). She initially created isolated figures. In 1953 and 1955, she participated in the São Paulo Art Biennial. In 1955, she received an award from the Museum of Modern Art, Rio de Janeiro. Her sculptures were incorporated into the collections of the São Paulo Museum of Art and the Musée d'Art Moderne de la Ville de Paris. She died in Campos do Jordão, São Paulo in 1996.
