= Arts Institute of the Federal University of Rio Grande do Sul =

Art school in Porto Alegre, Brazil

Coordinates: 30.0292°S 51.2233°W

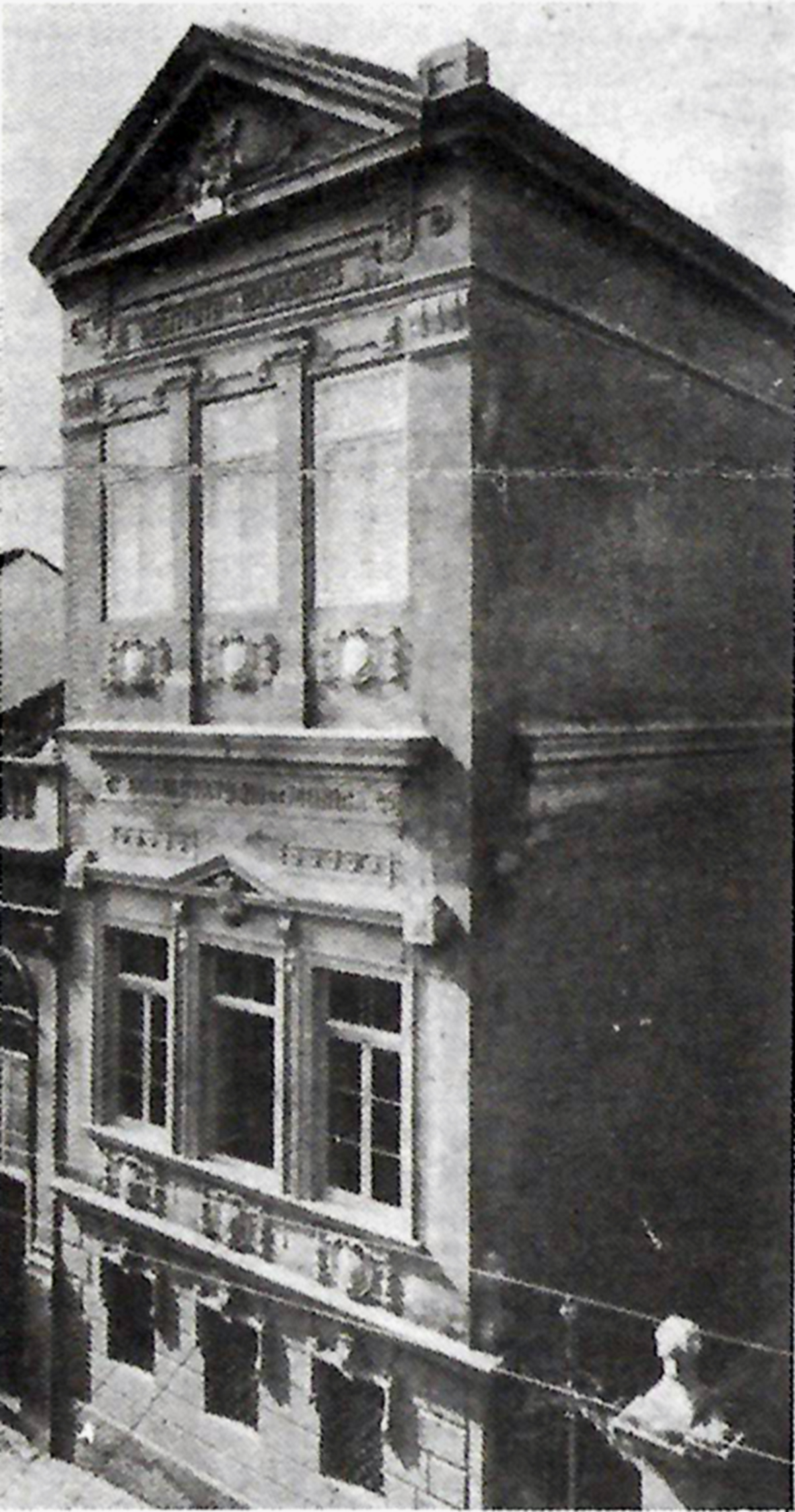
The first headquarters of the Institute of Arts.

The Arts Institute of the Federal University of Rio Grande do Sul is located at Senhor dos Passos Street, in the city of Porto Alegre, capital of Rio Grande do Sul. Its headquarters are located at Senhor dos Passos Street, 248, in Porto Alegre. Founded in 1908 under the name Instituto Livre de Belas Artes ('Free Institute of Fine Arts') by the initiative of the state government and under the direction of Olinto de Oliveira, the institute was initially divided into the Music and Fine Arts departments. It was the first higher education art school created in the state and is one of the oldest in Brazil still in operation.

Starting as an independent institution, the school was temporarily incorporated into the university for nearly thirty years, from 1934 onwards. This phase of instability ended in 1962 with its definitive integration, which allowed for the expansion and enhancement of its activities. The IA is currently composed of the departments of Visual Arts, Music, and Dramatic Arts. It has over one hundred professors and approximately 1,600 students. The institute maintains theoretical research centers, research laboratories in new media and technologies, a permanent collection, an exhibition gallery, a library, an auditorium, theater rooms, numerous university extension programs, and exchange and research agreements with national and international institutions and universities.

The institution was founded under challenging conditions and took decades to solidify its position. From the outset, however, it assumed the role of the primary center for artistic production and recognition in Rio Grande do Sul, playing a key role in the structuring, systematization, and professionalization of the art system. It has trained generations of students, many of whom later became renowned, and has been a leading center for the production and dissemination of art theory and criticism.

== Origins ==
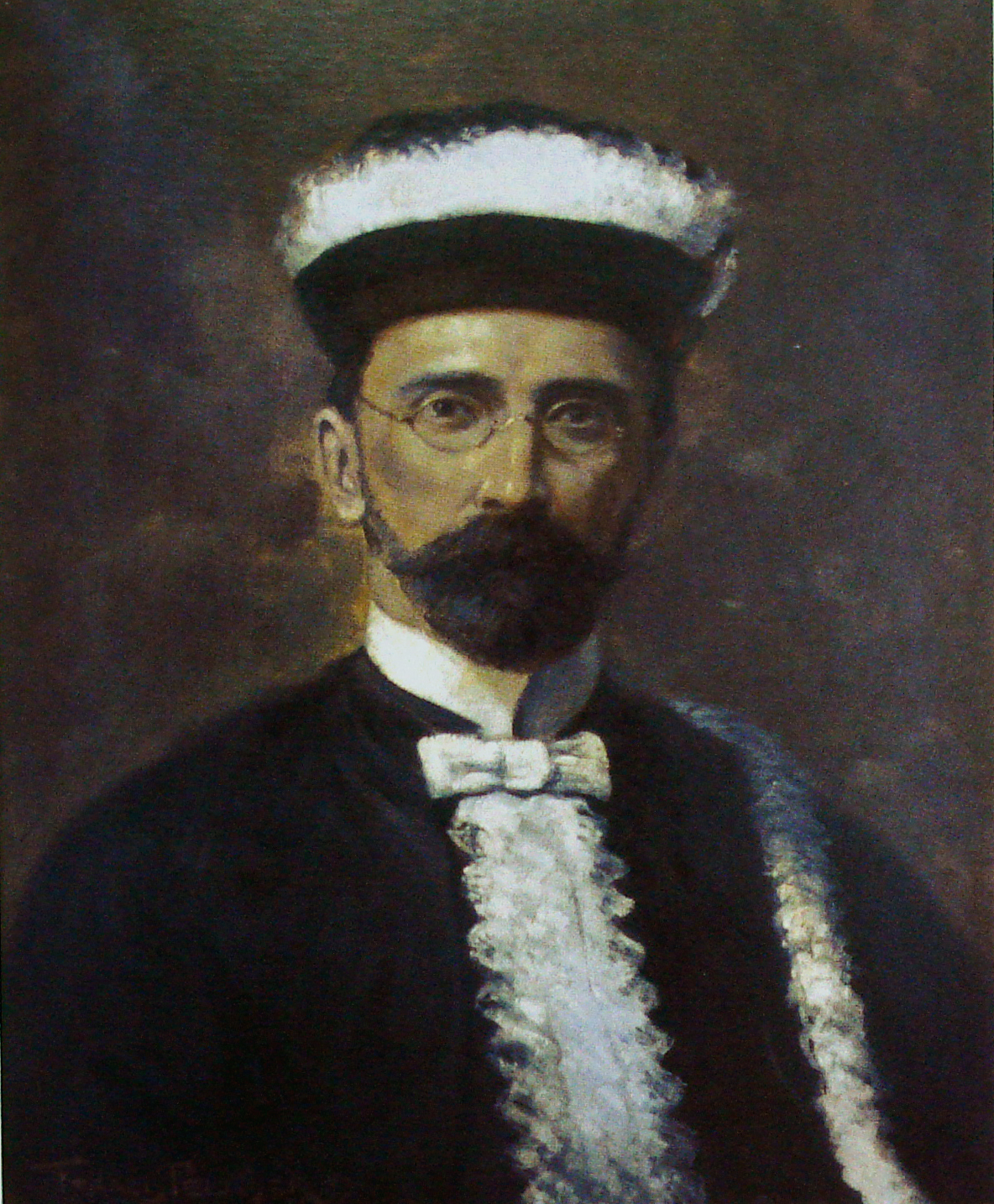
Olinto de Oliveira.

The Institute was founded under the name Instituto Livre de Belas Artes on April 22, 1908, at the initiative of the state president, Carlos Barbosa Gonçalves, through his representative and first director, Dr. Olinto de Oliveira, a doctor, musician, and intellectual. According to Círio Simon, it was an important step in a “civilizing project aimed at achieving autonomy in the state's symbolic field,” at a time when “Porto Alegre was strengthening its position as a regional leader.” This initiative sought to address some of the cultural deficiencies felt during the Empire, in what was seen as a “true republican regional civilizing compensatory project,” reflecting a similar movement in other parts of the country. The creation of an artistic institution also mirrored the aspirations of the positivist ideologues who dominated the government, serving as a necessary complement to the emphasis already placed on the sciences, as seen in the establishment of other higher education institutions in the state, including the faculties of Medicine, Pharmacy, Agronomy, Engineering, and Law. Press propaganda described the foundation as “the logical result of the evolution of civilization in Rio Grande do Sul.”

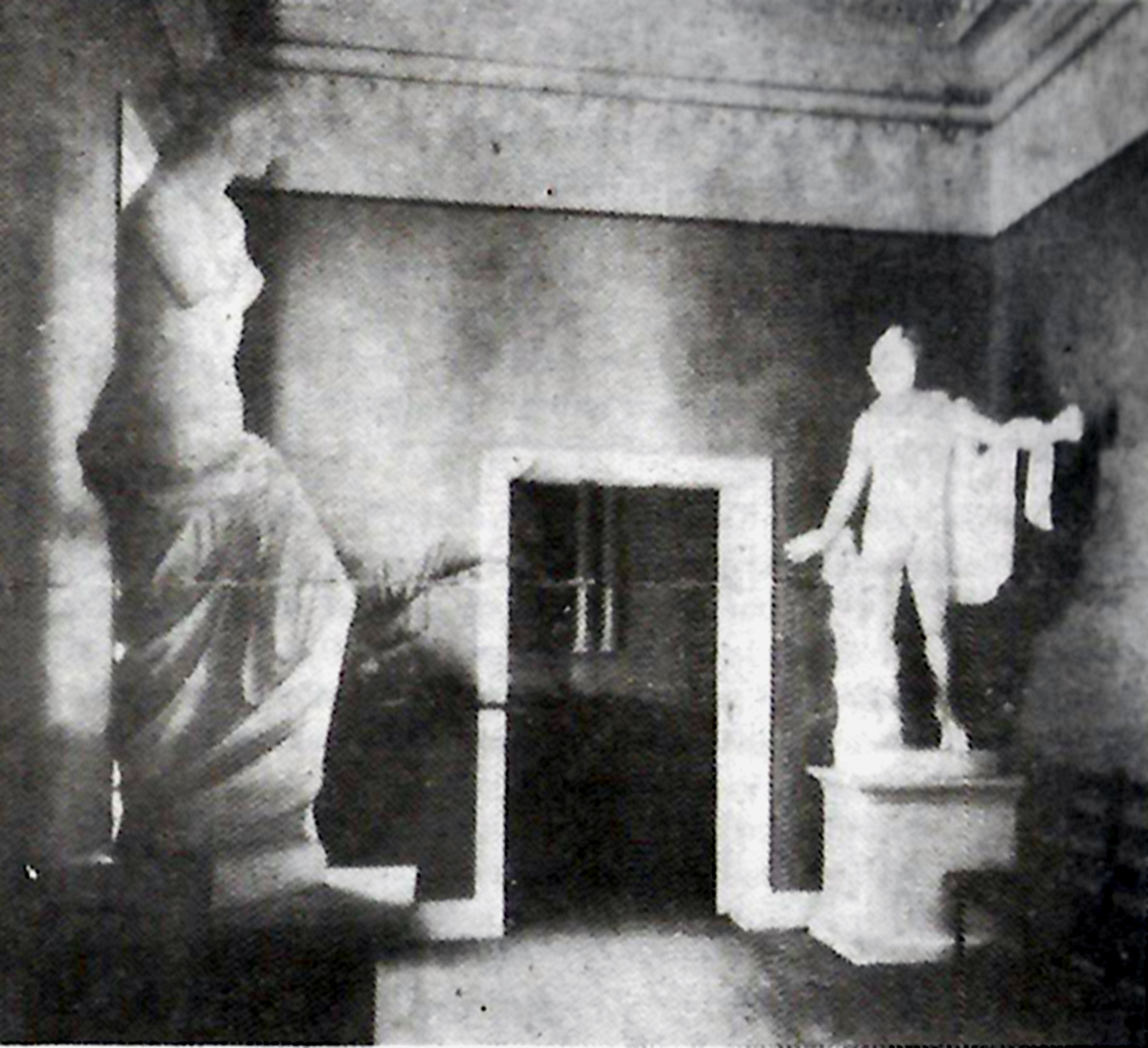
Replicas of the Venus de Milo and the Apollo Belvedere are in the lobby of the old headquarters.

The project had both a civilizing and political background, as it also served as propaganda for the “beneficence” of the Republic in contrast to the “negligence” of the Empire, which had shown no interest in supporting a higher art school in the province. As a result, previous attempts by private groups had been unsuccessful. However, this narrative did not align with reality, as the local social environment had not been sufficiently receptive to support such an initiative, and this relative inertia would become one of the main obstacles faced by the new institution during its early years of operation.

The first statutes were approved on August 14, published on August 22, and registered with a notary on August 28. The Central Commission responsible for administration was made up of 25 members, representing 65 regional support commissions established in the state's main urban centers. The president of the commission was the state president. This direct connection to the government provided the Instituto de Bellas Artes (IBA) with significant autonomy, but it also posed a potential risk of subjugation to the dominant political ideology and could lead to instability due to the constant political disputes between various pressure groups.

To mitigate this, the intellectuals within the Central Commission were committed to creating a structure based on disciplinary systematization, inspired by the model of traditional art academies that had proven effective over centuries, particularly the Escola Nacional de Belas Artes. They aimed was to establish a long-term perspective for the institution. They also sought to shield the IBA from direct political interference by including in the statutes a provision that it should remain free from any dogma, doctrine, or interest outside the artistic field. However, this was more of an aspiration than a practical reality, given that most Commission members had ties to political parties, positivism, or the Catholic Church, although no formal political or ideological representatives were on the Commission.

Despite the project calling for the participation of the entire Gaucho community, several factors made the IBA's operations difficult and precarious for many years. These included the lack of well-established artistic and institutional traditions, the early disbandment of the Commission, the informal nature of artistic careers at the time, the fragility of communication channels, limited initial community support, and scarce human and material resources. The survival of the IBA during this tumultuous early phase was largely due to the tireless efforts of Olinto de Oliveira, who remained at the helm until 1919.

== First phase ==
=== The School of Arts ===
On July 5, 1909, the Institute established its Music Conservatory. On February 10, 1910, the School of Arts was created and began operating on March 3, with Libindo Ferrás as its first director. That same year, plaster copies of the Apollo Belvedere and Venus de Milo were acquired for students to study, along with copies of ancient busts of Niobe, Ajax, and Venus, and models of hands and feet. In 1912, the formation of the Barão de Santo Ângelo Pinacoteca began with the acquisition of 60 paintings. The first premises on Rua Senhor dos Passos were acquired on April 4, 1913, for 30 contos de réis. In 1915, the budget was increased by Borges de Medeiros, allowing for improvements in the institution's general operating conditions, including the construction of an additional floor at the headquarters. The first graduates were Francisco Bellanca and Júlia Boeira, in 1919.

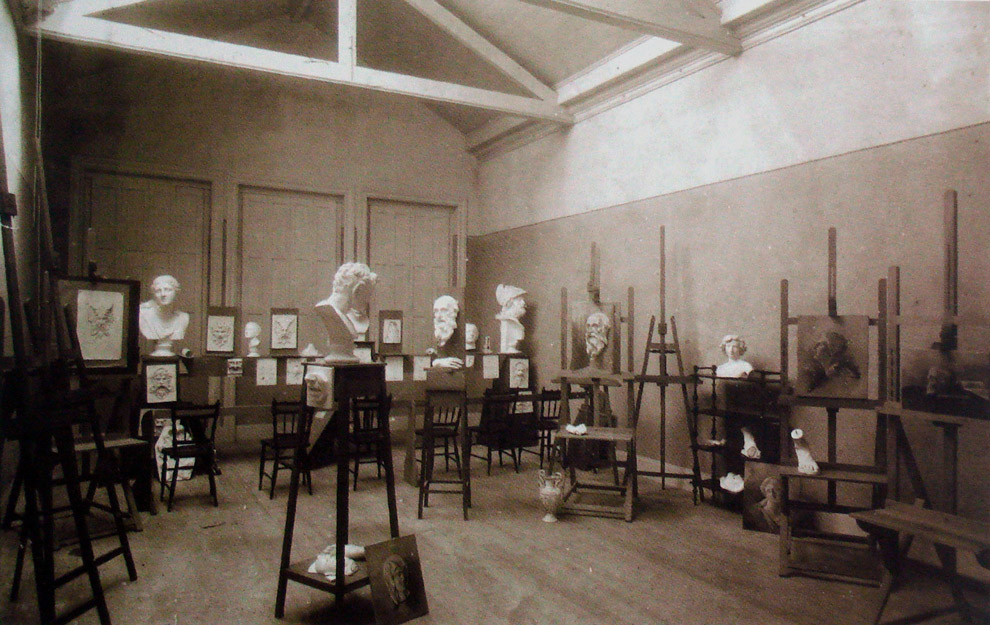
Drawing lesson based on the study of sculpture models, 1915.

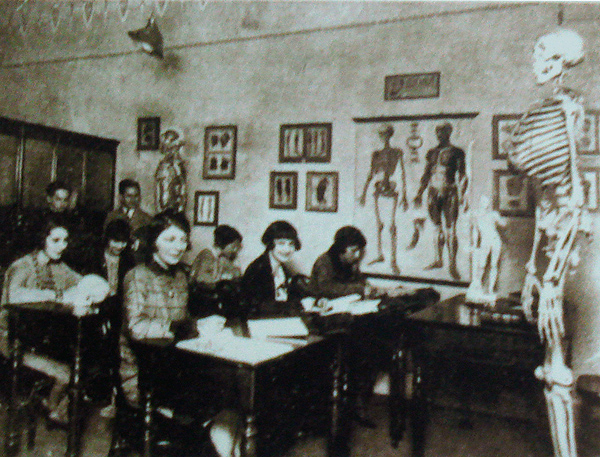
Anatomy class in 1928, led by Libindo Ferrás.

In addition to directing the School of Arts, Libindo Ferrás was its only teacher until 1913, after which he was assisted by teachers hired temporarily or by volunteers, but usually only one or two at a time. Renowned artists such as Pedro Weingärtner, Eugênio Latour, Augusto Luiz de Freitas, and Oscar Boeira all taught there. Although a variety of subjects were planned from the outset, Libindo was only able to gradually implement them, and in the first few decades, teaching-focused mainly on drawing. In 1910, he introduced courses in Geometric Drawing, Perspective and Shadows, and Artistic Anatomy Drawing, while referring the subject of Figured Drawing to external teachers. He later introduced other subjects, such as a synthetic evening course in 1917 (which lasted only three years), Life Model in 1918, and outdoor studies in 1919. In 1922, Francis Pelichek was hired as a permanent staff member and remained until 1936. Initially, he taught Notions of Painting and Figure for the higher education course and Plaster Drawing for the high school course. After 1926, when Advanced Painting became part of the curriculum, he taught pastel and oil painting in the studio, while Ferrás focused on watercolor and oil painting outdoors.

Teaching was characterized by free attendance, with the only requirement being to pass the end-of-year exams, which were conducted by guest artists. The classroom space was small, with no more than twenty students per year, and many dropped out halfway through the course. Few went on to become professionals after graduation. In 1927, new statutes were approved, dividing teaching into the areas of Music, Painting, Sculpture, Architecture, and Industrial Application Arts, shifting the initial emphasis on Drawing, which became an introductory subject for the other visual modalities. In practice, however, only Music and Painting were actively pursued. In 1929, the practice of organizing periodic art salons began.

=== The Conservatory of Music ===
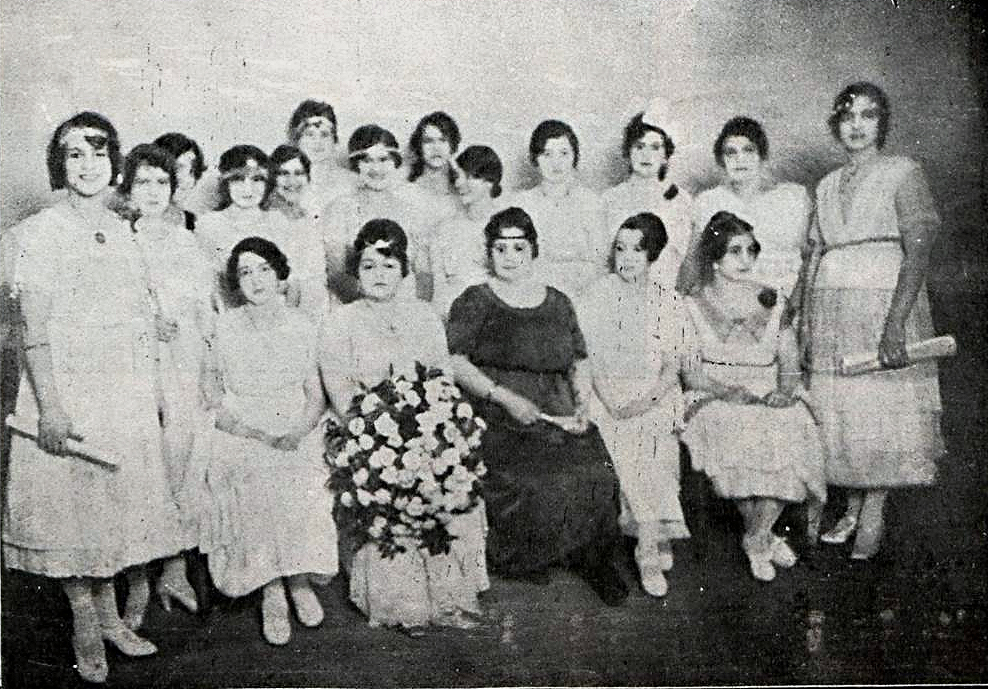
Singing teacher Olinta Braga and her students, 1919.

The Conservatory of Music, on the other hand, was organized more quickly and was more successful in the early years of the IBA's existence. While demand for Fine Arts courses remained low for many years, Music courses were much more popular, accounting for almost 90% of graduations between the 1920s and 1930s. The music field was far more active and popular in the city. While art teachers and professionals were few and worked in isolation, the public was small, and exhibitions were rare (there were no well-structured galleries in operation), the music community was much larger, more organized, and better connected. Numerous venues for music and professional ensembles existed, and the grand São Pedro Theater, operating since the mid-19th century, offered an extensive program of concerts, ballets, and operas.

Olinto de Oliveira was the first provisional director, starting on July 5, 1909. From the outset, a basic library of scores was acquired, and classes were offered in Solfeggio and Elementary Theory, Singing, Choral Singing, Piano, Violin, Harmony, and Composition. Wind instrument and Italian lessons, offered in the first year, were discontinued in the second year due to lack of demand. In the first year, 75 students were enrolled. José de Araújo Viana took over as director on March 1, 1910, but left a few months later for health reasons and was succeeded by Henri Pénasse. By 1912, 321 students had enrolled, and concerts and recitals began to be organized. Pénasse directed the Conservatory until 1921. He was a renowned pianist and restructured the program by emphasizing French and European repertoires and establishing open-admission competitions. The model he introduced was heavily influenced by the French conservatories. Classes in flute, cello, organ, counterpoint, and fugue were gradually introduced, and advanced theory classes began in 1924 under the initiative of Assuero Garritano. After Pénasse, Guilherme Fontainha, José Joaquim de Andrade Neves, and Tasso Corrêa succeeded him as directors until 1943.

In the early decades, women were the primary participants in music courses, with a marked preference for piano education, an instrument traditionally associated with elite culture. In the patriarchal society of the time, music was gradually becoming an acceptable profession for women, and teaching music provided an income without requiring them to leave home. On the other hand, the Conservatory became an important venue for debates on Brazilian musical Modernism, giving significant space in its concerts to works by national avant-garde composers. Since its founding, the Conservatory has become the most significant institutional reference in the state for music education, influencing the creation of other schools throughout the countryside.

== Incorporation into the university ==
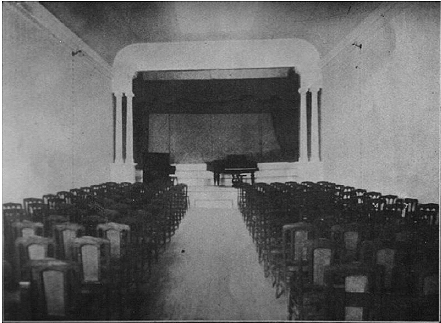
The IBA Auditorium in the first headquarters.

The Institute was one of the six colleges that formed the University of Porto Alegre (UPA) in 1934, which was officially established in 1936 after its federal recognition. The process of integration into the new Brazilian university system would prove to be long and complicated, as the new director, Tasso Corrêa, who took office in 1936, along with most of the professors, favored keeping the Institute as an independent institution. Tasso Corrêa assumed the directorship on April 17, 1936, and implemented a course of action based on the decrees governing the new system. According to Simon, this approach was “radically different from the model of the Central Commission’s statute… showing that the time of art amateurs was over and that the competence of art professionals had arrived. The idealism and selflessness of the old Central Commission were replaced by professionalism and actions codified in the new administrators’ manuals for the Getúlio Vargas-era university. In this context, any expression of the artist’s autonomy was not only viewed with suspicion but also as a challenge to institutional political power.” Despite this, Tasso Corrêa’s administration marked an era of renewal and professionalization.

In 1934, the Institute’s School of Arts was renamed the Plastic Arts Course, and new subjects were introduced, such as Modeling, Sculpture, Graphic Arts, Art History, and Aesthetics. During this time, demand for art courses grew significantly, eventually matching and surpassing music courses, and greater student participation emerged with the formation of a Student Guild. In 1938, a Technical Administrative Council (CTA) was created to replace the old Central Commission, which was officially abolished on January 6, 1939. Tasso Corrêa, who led the Institute until 1958, abolished the positions of director for the School of Arts and the Conservatory of Music, consolidating all administrative power in his hands. According to Simon, he became the “undisputed leader of the Institute and brought it to the forefront among national art institutions in Brazil. There is a noticeable difference between the art administrators of the First Republic and those after 1930. While the Old Republic generation was composed of solemn and imperial figures, Tasso Corrêa embodied the post-1930 agent-entrepreneur of art and culture in his institutional administration. He remained aligned with the new industrial era and was an active agent in tune with the republican nationalist state.” The curriculum he implemented in 1939, which was for undergraduates only and did not offer a degree, remained in effect until 1965.

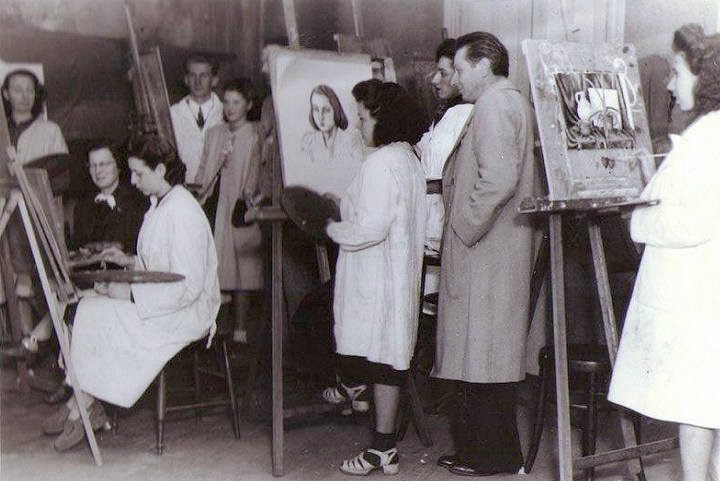
Angelo Guido teaching, 1940s.

The Institute was disaffiliated from the UPA on January 5, 1939, due to the lack of federal recognition and adequate facilities. In the same year, new statutes were drawn up, a Press and Propaganda department was created, and technical courses in Architecture and Plastic Arts (which included Painting, Sculpture, and Engraving) were established, under the direction of professors Angelo Guido, Fernando Corona, and João Fahrion. The “technical courses” represented a restructuring of the old high school or preparatory courses and reflected a shift from an institution that had previously focused solely on the arts to a new model in which the arts were understood to provide useful services to society and support industries such as publishing and advertising. As a result, the high school adopted a vocational focus. On November 15, the first statewide arts salon was inaugurated to celebrate the 50th anniversary of the Proclamation of the Republic. In 1940, travel grants were introduced to be awarded to the best students. Federal recognition of the Music and Fine Arts degrees was granted on May 20, 1941, but reintegration into the UPA did not occur.

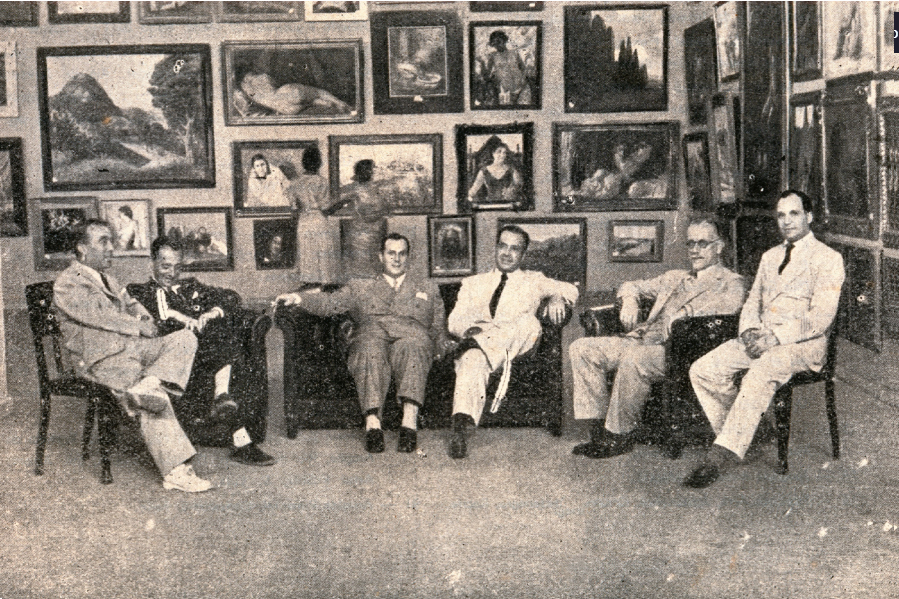
Members of the 1941 Salon jury.

In 1941, a campaign was launched to build a new headquarters that would better meet the needs of the growing institution. Since the funds raised were insufficient, Tasso Corrêa, along with professors Ênio de Freitas e Castro, Oscar Simm, and Fernando Corona, mortgaged their homes to secure the loan from the financing bank. The foundation stone was laid on November 14, 1941, and the new headquarters was inaugurated on July 1, 1943, alongside the official opening of the Pinacoteca and the III Salão de Belas Artes do Rio Grande do Sul.

On October 4, 1943, the CTA once again applied to rejoin the UPA, and this request was accepted on January 5, 1944. On September 21 of the same year, the Architecture and Urban Planning degree courses were created. However, on December 30, the IBA was once again disaffiliated from the UPA because the University Council had not been consulted about the creation of the Architecture and Urban Planning courses, viewing the decision as an act of rebellion. On December 3, 1945, the IBA was incorporated into the UPA for the third time through a unilateral decision by the state government, which led to the resignation of the rector. However, the IBA was disaffiliated for the third time on January 9, 1946, by a unilateral decision from the new rector. To avoid further conflict, the state government accepted the decision.

In the same year, the technical courses were abolished and absorbed into the curriculum of the higher education programs. Despite the animosity between the university and the IBA, studies on regular reintegration began, though negotiations were complicated by the establishment of the Higher Course in Urban Planning on March 28, 1947, without consulting the university, as it had been authorized by the Federal Government in 1945. At the same time, the IBA began planning to transform into the University of Fine Arts to preserve its autonomy. In response, a decree from the UPA rector in July 1948 ruled out any possibility of reintegration. The state government intervened again, unilaterally reinstating the Institute on November 3. The rector resisted, but the government ultimately backed down. On November 24, 1949, escalating the conflict, the rector abolished the Institute’s Architecture and Urban Planning courses to pave the way for the creation of the Faculty of Architecture linked to the UPA. The rector exceeded his authority, as the Institute was not formally part of the university at the time. That same year, the UPA was transformed into the University of Rio Grande do Sul (URGS).

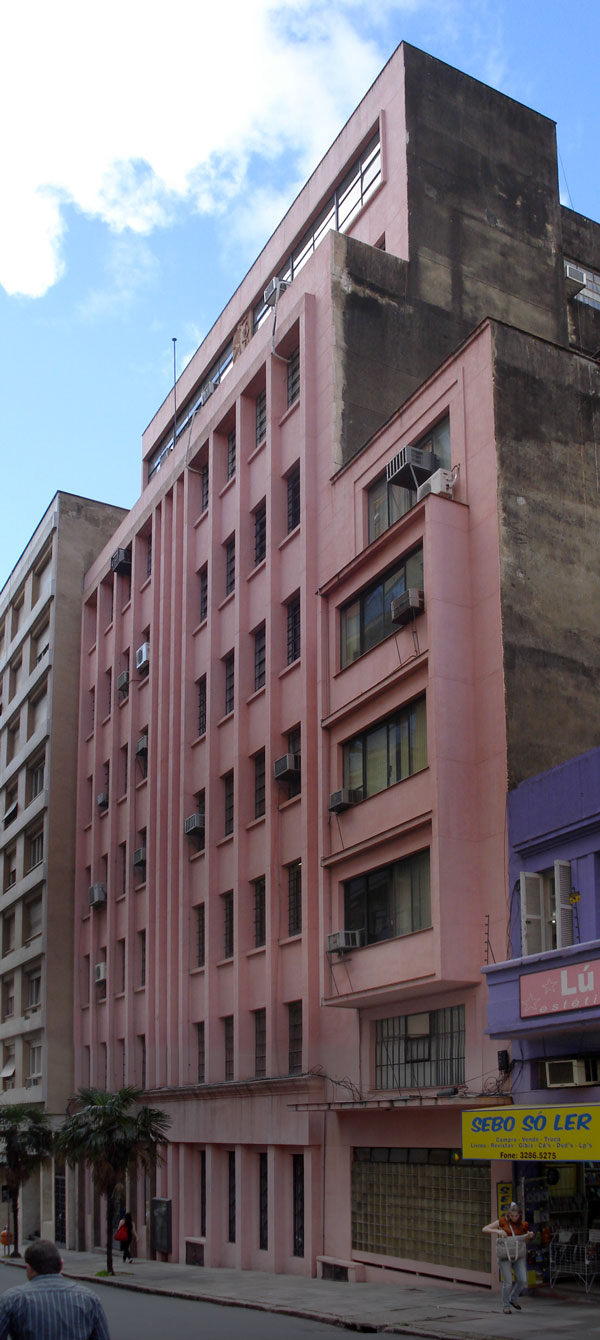
Current Institute building.

On September 8, 1950, the Federal Senate issued a decree to resolve the issue once and for all, ordering the incorporation of the IBA into the URGS. The decree also transferred the Architecture and Urbanism programs from the IBA to the Faculty of Architecture, officially making it part of the university, and federalizing the institution, transforming it into the current UFRGS. The Painting, Sculpture, and Music programs were maintained and registered with the federal higher education system of the Ministry of Education. The decree clarified the legal status of the institutions, but it also created new contradictions, as it placed the administration of the IBA under the State Government's Directorate of Higher and Supplementary Education. In practical terms, this amounted to a new separation from the now-federal university. In 1951, a full reintegration of the Institute into UFRGS was planned, but it never materialized, although its assets were transferred to the Union.

Despite the institutional challenges, by this time the IBA had established itself as a leading institution in the state’s arts system, offering well-structured programs and fostering modern artistic production. In 1951, a group of 18 artists from the Institute was invited to exhibit at the first São Paulo Art Biennial, presenting 35 works. In 1954, critic Quirino Campofiorito stated that “overcoming the difficulties that have always hindered good initiatives in artistic education in our country, a great school of art is already being built today, deserving of unconditional applause,” noting the selflessness of the team and the growing prestige of the school, which had long been officially recognized and integrated with honor into the country’s higher education system.

During this period of change, between 1952 and 1953, a better space was built for the Pinacoteca, along with new studios that provided ample natural light. In 1954, the Music program was divided into two cycles: a four-year Elementary Course and a five-year Higher Course for Singing and Instruments, and seven years for Composition, Conducting, and Organ. National and Foreign Travel Awards for further training were also introduced. In 1957, the Dramatic Art program was created, initially linked to the Faculty of Philosophy. In 1958, to commemorate the fiftieth anniversary, the 1st Brazilian Art Congress was held, with participants such as Sérgio Milliet, Pietro Maria Bardi, Paulo Duarte, Luiz Martins, Arnaldo Estrella, and Jorge Amado. As part of the celebrations, the Mexican Painters Exhibition was opened, featuring works by José Orozco, Rufino Tamayo, David Siqueiros, and Diego Rivera. Other events included the 1st Pan-American Art Salon and the 8th Official Fine Arts Salon of Rio Grande do Sul. The following year saw the opening of the Escolinha de Artes, an outreach project for children and young people. In 1960, the Department for the Dissemination of Artistic Culture was created.

Tasso Corrêa had always defended the IBA's autonomy, but after he left the board in 1958, this position became increasingly untenable. Fearing progressive isolation, funding difficulties, and a loss of functionality and prestige, internal resistance began to diminish. As a result, the Institute moved toward rapprochement with the university, culminating in a federal decree on November 30, 1962, which fully and definitively incorporated the IBA into UFRGS. This ended a long period of institutional instability and began a phase of profound restructuring and expansion. In 1963, new statutes were approved, and the IBA was renamed the School of Fine Arts. In 1964, the Higher Music program was split into undergraduate courses in Singing, Instruments, Composition, and Conducting, and in 1965, a Degree in Music was created. In 1968, the school was restructured to align with the UFRGS institutes. However, that same year, with the military dictatorship in power, the university began purging teachers and students deemed subversive. On September 18, 1970, the school became part of the Arts and Letters department and was renamed the Instituto Central de Artes (Central Arts Institute). The Dramatic Art program was removed from the Faculty of Philosophy and incorporated into the Institute, creating a special department for it. The Visual Arts and Music departments were reorganized. In 1982, the undergraduate programs were transformed into bachelor’s degrees. In 1987, the Degree in Artistic Education was created, followed by the Degree in Distance Learning Music in 2008, the Degree in History of Art in 2010, and the Degree in Popular Music in 2012.

== Postgraduate degrees ==
In 1962, the process of structuring postgraduate courses began, with the approval on October 30 of a two-year Postgraduate Improvement Course in Painting, Sculpture, Decorative Arts, and Singing. In 1987, the Master’s Degree in Music was established, with concentrations in Composition, Music Education, Musicology/Ethnomusicology, and Interpretative Practices, followed by the Doctorate in 1995 in the same areas. The Postgraduate Program in Music was the only one in the country to receive the maximum score of 7 from CAPES.

In the Visual Arts, the Master’s degree was created in 1991, and the Doctorate in 1998, focusing on Visual Poetics and the History, Theory, and Criticism of Art. In 1995, the Visual Arts Documentation and Research Center was founded, with divisions in the areas of Memory and Modern and Contemporary Art in Rio Grande do Sul, including an editorial program. In 1997, the Art and Technology Laboratory was created, followed by the Infographics and Multimedia Laboratory. The Specialization in Museology and Cultural Heritage was launched in 2001.

The Master's in Performing Arts was established in 2001, and the Doctorate in 2015. In recent years, a series of agreements have been made with national and international institutions across all three departments, along with the organization of congresses and seminars and the publication of specialized literature.

== Current days ==
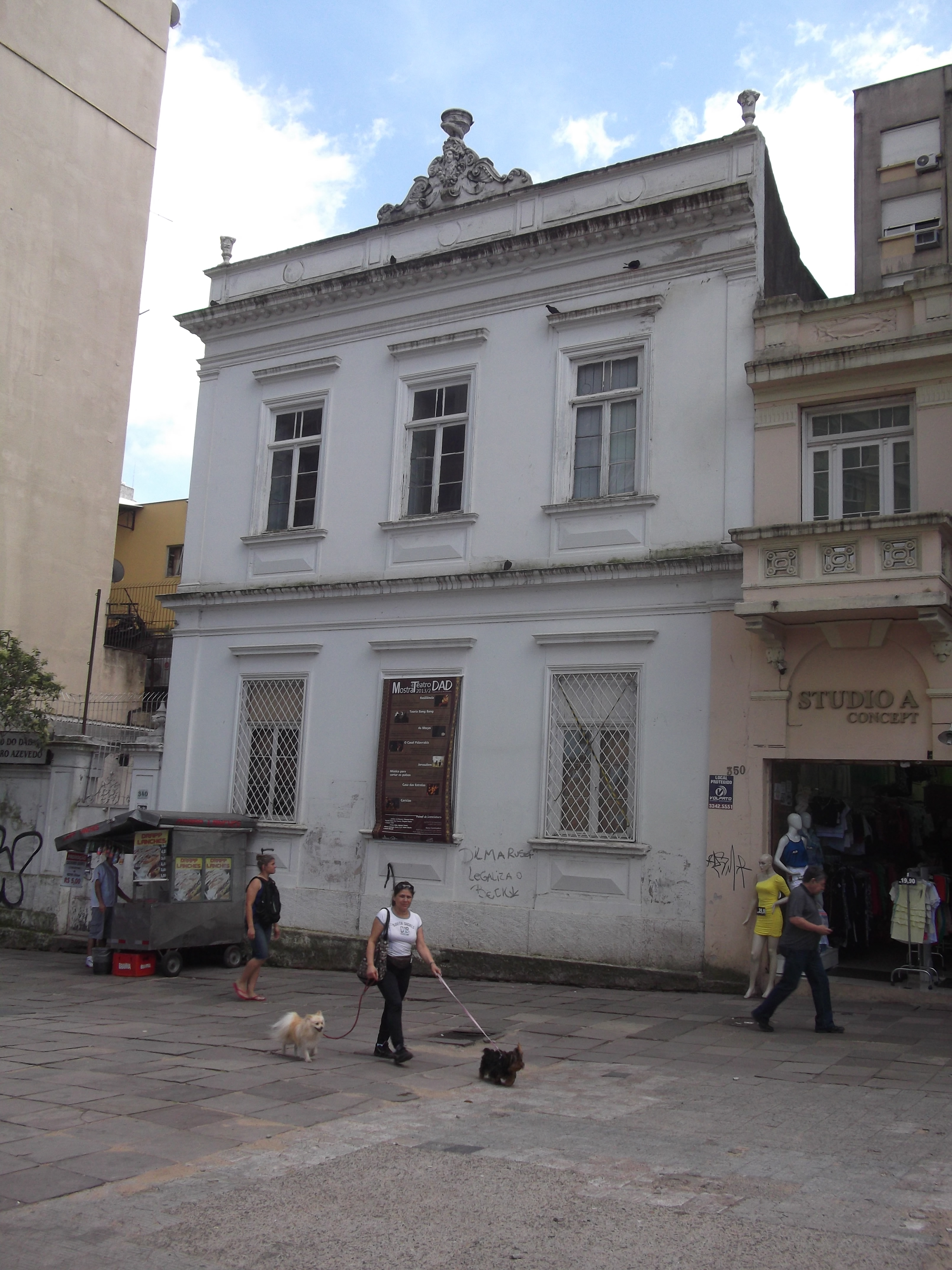
Headquarters of the Department of Dramatic Art.

The Institute currently consists of the Visual Arts and Music departments, located in the historic headquarters on Rua Senhor dos Passos, and the Dramatic Art department, located at a secondary headquarters on Rua General Vitorino. All departments offer Bachelor's, Master's, and Doctorate programs. Another secondary location on Professor Annes Dias Street houses the postgraduate program in Music. The Institute has over one hundred faculty members and approximately 1,600 students. It is equipped with research centers, an exhibition gallery, a central library with more than 20,000 volumes, an auditorium for concerts and events, two theaters, numerous university extension programs, and exchange and research agreements with national and international universities.

The Barão de Santo Ângelo Pinacoteca preserves and promotes the oldest public art collection in the state of Rio Grande do Sul. Established in 1908 at the founding of the Institute and installed in 1910, it functioned for many years under inadequate conditions. However, since the 1990s, it has undergone rapid development and has become a prominent part of the state's cultural scene. With around three thousand inventoried items, it is one of the main collections in Rio Grande do Sul and includes works by the most prominent local artists, many of whom were former teachers or students of the Institute. The collection is housed in two long-term exhibition spaces with in-house collections, a multi-use gallery, a technical reserve in the Rectory building, a secondary location in the former Faculty of Medicine building, a restoration laboratory, a historical archive, and an art research center. Its activities include curated exhibitions featuring the collection, exhibitions of works produced by students and teachers, external exhibitions, seminars for discussions on criticism, theory, and history of art, educational projects for schools, publications, collaborations with other institutions, and serving as a valuable resource for researchers of Rio Grande do Sul art and for students and faculty of undergraduate and postgraduate programs in Visual Arts, History of Art, Visual Poetics, Curatorial Practices, Museology, and History, Theory, and Criticism of Art.

In line with aesthetic and technical developments in the arts, the Institute’s current policy encourages research and innovative initiatives in both the theoretical and practical fields, supported by modern facilities such as digital video production, computer graphics and multimedia, and electronic music laboratories. However, the Institute’s headquarters are old, small, and, in many ways, inadequate for contemporary activities. A move to larger, more suitable premises has been awaited for many years. Some spaces have already experienced leaks and flooding, damaging equipment and hindering activities. Due to space constraints, the Historical Archive has temporarily been relocated to the former Faculty of Medicine building.

== Legacy ==
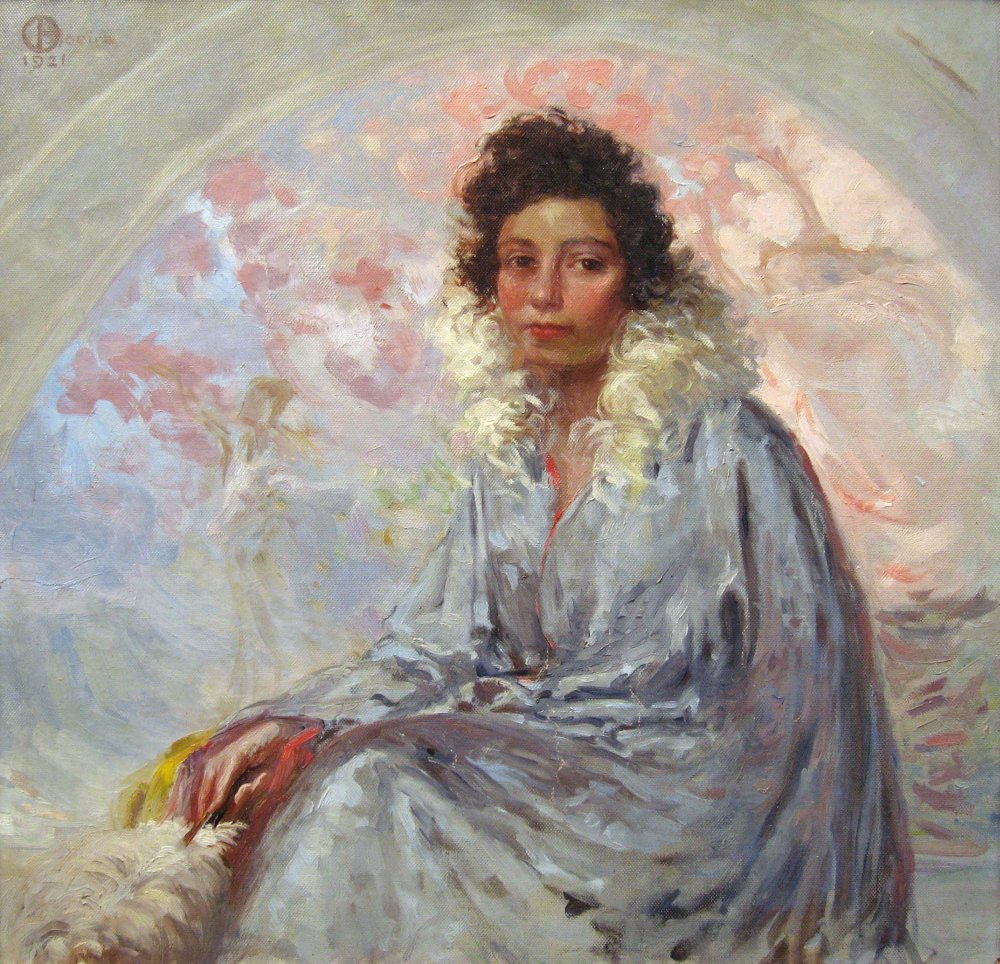
Retrato de senhora, 1921, by Oscar Boeira, collection of the Barão de Santo Ângelo Pinacoteca.

The Institute's importance in structuring, stabilizing, and professionalizing the art system in Rio Grande do Sul is well-documented in the substantial critical bibliography produced about it. It remains one of the key players in establishing the state as a national reference in artistic production. This prestige is attributed to both its courses and the personal work of its teachers, many of whom were artists who gained prominence in Brazil, as well as its students, many of whom also became recognized figures after leaving the school. Notable alumni include Alice Soares, Regina Silveira, Glauco Rodrigues, Glênio Bianchetti, Plínio Bernhardt, Rose Lutzenberger, Sônia Ebling, Vasco Prado, among many others.

The IBA also played an important role in the debate and tensions between academia and modernism. After initial resistance, the Institute embraced modernity and contributed to its dissemination, especially during Tasso Corrêa's reformist administration and later through Angelo Guido's conceptual contributions as a professor and a key figure in articulating a solid body of art theory. Ado Malagoli, who was brought in by Guido to teach, was not strictly a theoretician but was a pivotal figure in updating artistic trends in the state from the 1950s onward through his teaching and example. He also played an influential role as the director of the Culture and Art Teaching Division of the Department of Education for many years and as the founder and first director of the Rio Grande do Sul Museum of Art, which from its inception provided significant space for modern artists.

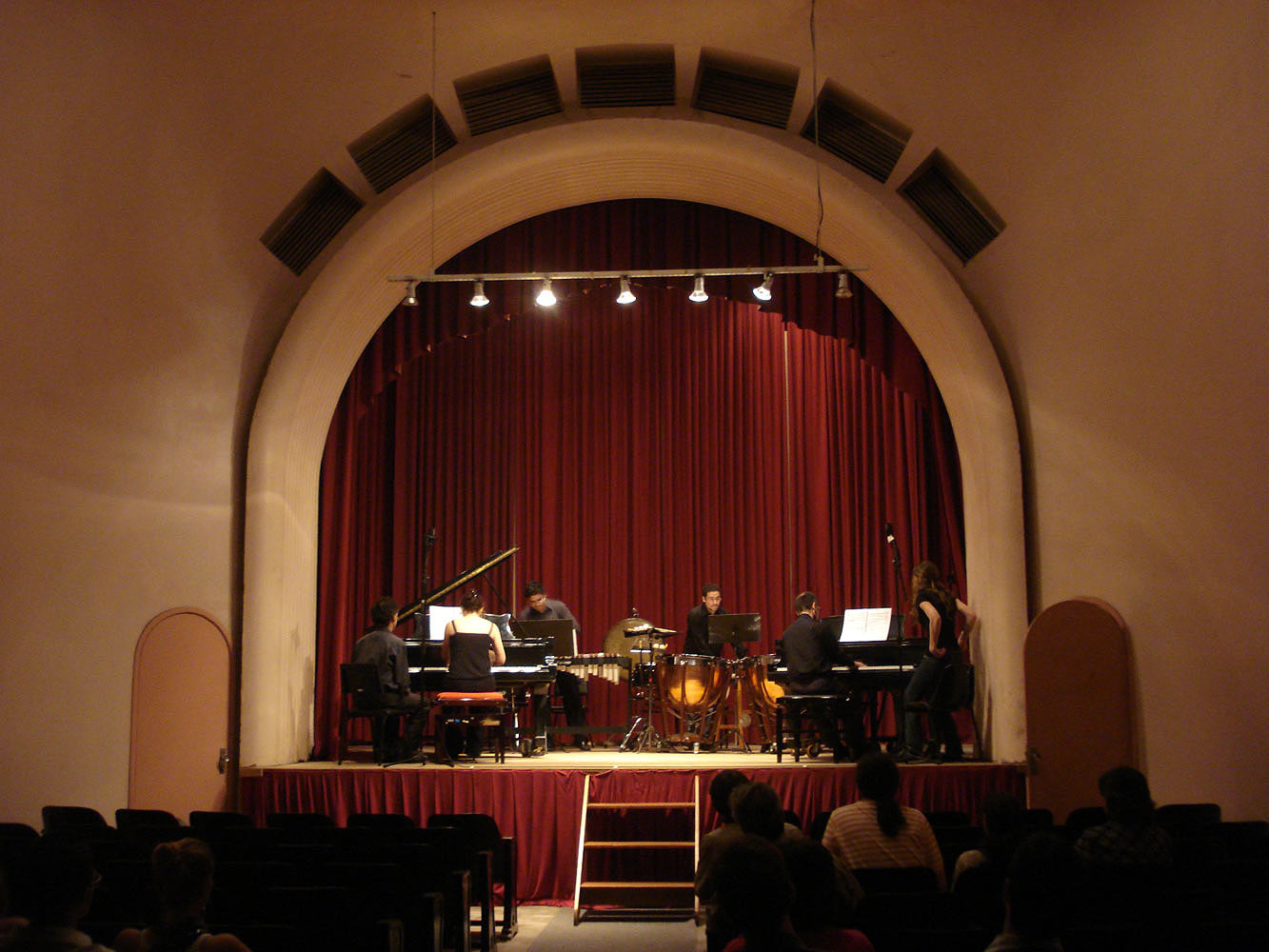
Recital in the auditorium of the Institute of Arts in 2009.

Several other masters would later make important contributions to a continuous process of updating and diversifying artistic production. Additionally, the Institute's periodic art salons became important forums for aesthetic discussion, the diagnosis and mapping of trends, and the recognition of new talents. The establishment of postgraduate courses was also crucial for deepening artists' reflections on their work, for curatorial training (which was later reflected in many other institutions), and for research, theorizing, and the production of critical bibliographies. Furthermore, these courses enabled the expansion of exchange programs with reputable institutions in Brazil and abroad, resulting in numerous national and international congresses and colloquia. Several research groups and independent art spaces were also created at the Institute. The qualification of the art gallery's activities and the staging of exhibitions featuring prominent local and Brazilian artists earned it a national reputation.

The Music Course also became a reference, inspiring the opening of several other music schools across the state. According to critic and historian Paulo Gomes, the Institute had a significant influence in shaping the aesthetic direction of Rio Grande do Sul. Cattani & Bulhões stated:

Official institutions, commercial galleries, and even art criticism have always been in their early stages. Thus, the art scene in Porto Alegre and the state was shaped by the movement taking place at the Institute of Arts. [...] The oldest and most respected institution for training artists in the city and state, the Institute has worked for the last 40 years to articulate two important orientations that make it a true space for art. On one hand, it maintains a certain conservatism, seeking to preserve and transmit fundamental knowledge for the training of artists and the quality of its academic work. On the other hand, it serves as a shelter for boldness and experimentation, stimulating renewal and breaking with current practices.

== See also ==
- History of classical music in Porto Alegre
- Painting in Rio Grande do Sul

== Bibliography ==
- Simon, Círio (2003). Origens do Instituto de Artes da UFRGS: Etapas entre 1908-1962 e contribuições na constituição de expressões de autonomia no Sistema de Artes Visuais do Rio Grande do Sul [Origins of the UFRGS Arts Institute: Stages between 1908-1962 and contributions to the constitution of expressions of autonomy in the Visual Arts System of Rio Grande do Sul] (PDF) (in Portuguese). Porto Alegre: Pontifícia Universidade Católica do Rio Grande do Sul. Archived from the original (PDF) on 2022-12-12.
- Brites, Blanca; Cattani, Icleia Borsa; Bulhões, Maria Amélia; Gomes, Paulo (2012). 100 anos de Artes Plásticas no Institutos de Artes da UFRGS: Três ensaios [100 years of Plastic Arts at the UFRGS Art Institute: Three essays] (PDF) (in Portuguese) (1st ed.). Porto Alegre: Editora UFRGS. p. 264. ISBN 978-85-386-0180-7. Archived from the original (PDF) on 2025-01-16.
