= History of classical music in Porto Alegre =

Classical music in Porto Alegre, the capital of Rio Grande do Sul, Brazil, begins at the end of the 18th century, but this artistic field did not really begin to flourish until the middle of the 19th century, and was consolidated throughout the 20th century with the founding of several educational institutions and the proliferation of groups, interpreters and composers, projecting the city across the state as the main producer and radiator of influence. Currently Porto Alegre has a considerable audience for classical music; it is in the script of concertists of international fame, has two stable orchestras and a chamber orchestra, and numerous smaller chamber groups and vocal and instrumental soloists, as well as a large number of music schools and performance spaces. Some of its composers have known national fame. According to conductor Isaac Karabtchevsky, who was the artistic director of OSPA, "there is no greater identity in music in the world than in the population of Porto Alegre". At the same time there is a significant development in academic research and advanced professional qualification in undergraduate and graduate courses in music at UFRGS.

== Early time ==
Porto Alegre was officially founded on March 26, 1772, when the primitive settlement was raised to the status of parish, but in fact its origins are older, having been born due to the colonization of the area by Portuguese estancieiros since the 17th century. It is taken for granted that at the time of the elevation of the original village in the parish, there was already musical activity of a classical character being practiced on some regular basis. A document attests that in 1794 the city's first Opera House was inaugurated, built in Beco dos Ferreiros. This house was actually a simple wooden shed, and, apparently, "opera" was the least heard. Athos Damasceno believes that before the conclusion of Theatro São Pedro in 1858, there would have been no conditions to assemble real operas in Porto Alegre, with several singers, a great orchestra and choir. Although, due to the absence of descriptions, it remains to be seen what the real nature and quality of these so-called operas represented there might have been, everything leads us to believe that they followed the same popular patterns in larger centers such as Rio de Janeiro and São Paulo, where on the same night a heterogeneous program was shown to the public, consisting of circus acts and theatrical plays of popular appeal interspersed with pieces of music, including serious works such as piano sonatas and Neapolitan songs, alongside improvisations and ballroom music such as mazurkas and waltzes.
