= Sonia Ebling =

Brazilian sculptor

- Born: Sonia Ebling de Kermoal; 1918; Taquara, Rio Grande do Sul, Brazil
- Died: 2006 (aged 87–88); Rio de Janeiro, Brazil
- Known for: Sculpture

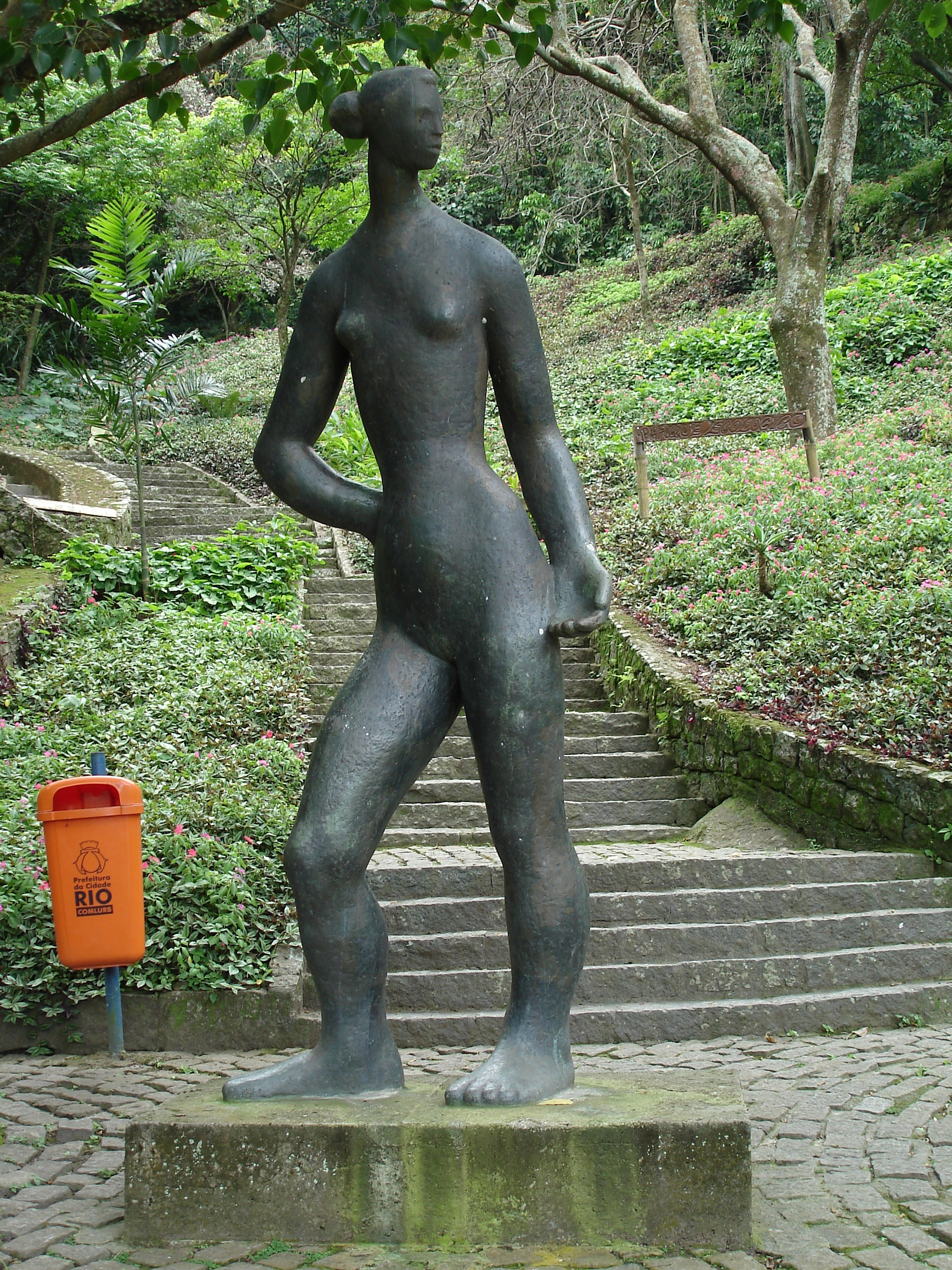
Sonia Ebling's bronze statue Sofia at the Catacumba Park, Rio de Janeiro, Brazil

Sonia Ebling (1918–2006) was a Brazilian sculptor and teacher.

== Biography ==
Born in Taquara, Ebling began her art studies in painting and sculpture, in the Schools of Fine Arts of Rio Grande do Sul and Rio de Janeiro between 1944 and 1951. In 1955, she received the Award for Foreign Travel from National Modern Art in Rio de Janeiro for the sculpture Woman and Bird. She remained in Europe until 1968, studying with Ossip Zadkine in Paris, and getting a grant from the Calouste Gulbenkian Foundation. She exhibited at major events such as the Salon de la Jeune Sculpture at the Rodin Museum, the Art Biennial Tri-Veneta of Padua, the Salon de Réalités Nouvelles and the Salon des Petits Bronzes of the Museum of Modern Art in Paris. Eblin represented Brazil in Documenta of Kassel, and participated in the seventh Bienal of São Paulo. Returning to Brazil, she received an order for a relief to be installed in the Palace of the Arches in Brasília.

In 1970, she taught a course in cement sculpture at the School of Fine Arts at Universidade Federal do Rio Grande do Sul; six years later, she was invited to assume the chair of sculpture at the same university. Her work in cement includes the adding of oxide pigments and vegetable fibers, creating a durable and adaptable piece of art characterized as both a painting and a sculpture. She died in 2006.
