= Banco Sulbrasileiro =

Defunct Brazilian banking institution

- Company type: S.A. (corporation)
- Industry: Financial services
- Predecessor: Banco da Província; Banco Nacional do Comércio; Banco Industrial e Comercial do Sul
- Founded: 1972
- Defunct: 1985
- Fate: Expropriated by the Brazilian government and merged
- Successor: Banco Meridional
- Headquarters: Porto Alegre, Rio Grande do Sul, Brazil
- Area served: Branches throughout Brazil
- Products: Banking services, loans

Banco Sul Brasileiro was a Brazilian bank created in 1972 with the merger of Banco Nacional do Comércio (Banmércio), Banco da Província and Banco Industrial e Comercial do Sul (Sulbanco), with regulatory oversight from the Brazilian government. The bank was expropriated by the Brazilian government in 1985 and its assets used to form a new bank.

The directors of Banmércio, the first to be controlled by the Montepio da Família Militar, assumed key positions in the bank when it was first founded. The closure of some branches resulted in a redistribution of employees across the remaining locations.

== History ==
=== Foundation and growth ===
Between 1972 and 1982, the bank expanded its operations in Brazil, with 55 branches closing in Rio Grande do Sul, and new branches opening in São Paulo (37), Rio de Janeiro (10), Minas Gerais (12), Santa Catarina (5), Paraná (5), and other states (23). By the end of 1982, the bank had 379 branches, 37 more than at the time of the merger. In subsequent years, until the following intervention, the number of branches remained stable.

=== Challenges 1981 ===
The bank faced several operational challenges. In 1981 it was the seventh-largest branch network in the country, but 15th in deposits. It had low profitability, huge permanent assets, low productivity, and a low-quality credit portfolio.

In 1985, economist Eduardo Maldonado Filho wrote:

In 1981, Sulbrasileiro's return on equity was 9.7%, while the average rate for the sector was 22.8%. In 1982, the performance figures were 6.0% and 21.2% respectively, while for 1983, according to data from the magazine Melhores e Maiores (1983), the situation was as follows: 6.7% and 17.62% respectively. The differences in profitability rates reveal, even at first glance, the poor performance of Banco Sulbrasileiro.

=== Intervention 1984 ===
At the beginning of 1984, it began negotiations to join forces with the Habitasul Group and later with the Brasilinvest group, owned by Mário Garnero, but these did not progress. On February 7, 1985, Sulbrasileiro was intervened by the Central Bank of Brazil due to liquidity problems.

During this period, other banks also had liquidity problems and suffered intervention, extrajudicial liquidation, or incorporation. Examples include Habitasul and Brasilinvest, which had tried to merge with Sulbrasileiro, Banco Auxiliar de São Paulo, Banco de Comércio e Industria do Estado de São Paulo (Comind), Banco Habitasul S/A, Banco Maisonnave, Banco Nacional (absorbed by Unibanco), and Bamerindus (sold to HSBC).

=== Closure ===
In May 1985 the Federal Government created Banco Meridional do Brasil S/A, expropriating Sulbrasileiro's shares through a federal decree-law No. 7315/1985 and other measures, leading to the bank's extinction. As part of its assets, Banco Meridional received around 15,000 items from Sulbrasileiro, including 5,000 plots of land on ten beaches and 80,000 to 90,000 hectares of rural property.

== See also ==
- Central Bank of Brazil
- Banco Nacional do Comércio
- Banco da Província
