= Banco Nacional do Comércio =

Defunct Brazilian bank

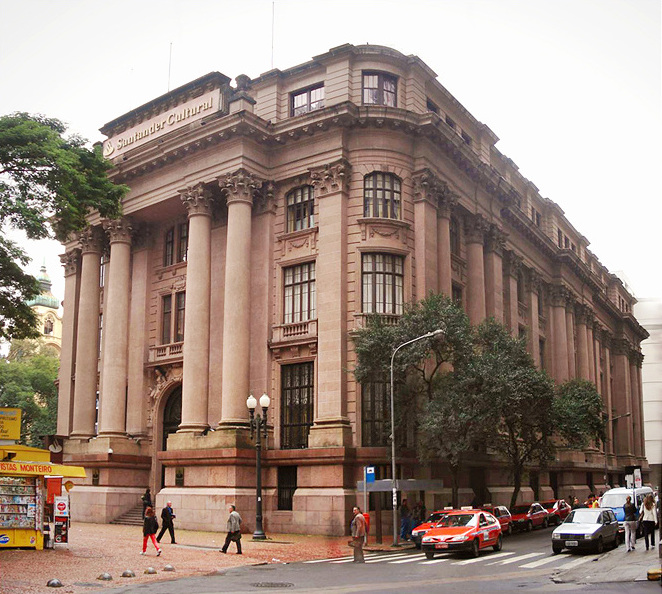
- Former headquarters of the Banco Nacional do Comércio.
- Formerly: Banco do Comércio
- Founded: April 1, 1895; 130 years ago
- Defunct: 1973
- Headquarters: Porto Alegre, Rio Grande do Sul; Brazil
- Services: Financial

Banco Nacional do Comércio (English: National Bank of Commerce), also known as Banmércio, was the second commercial bank created in Rio Grande do Sul. It began operations on April 1, 1895, under the name Banco do Comércio.

== History ==
Banco Nacional do Comércio was founded by the commercial companies Caetano Pinto & Franco and Azevedo Irmãos & Cia, and the merchants Edmundo Dreher, Hugo Gertum, Francisco Gonçalves and Fernando do Amaral Ribeiro. Francisco Gonçalves Carneiro, Eduardo Dreher and Manoel Gonçalves Junior formed the institution's first board of directors. The company started with six employees; by 1899 it had 15, 21 in 1909 and 410 in 1919. It reached 954 employees in 1944.

At the beginning, Banco Nacional do Comércio struggled due to the economic difficulties in the area, which made it limit its operations to mortgage loans. As a result, the company accumulated many properties acquired in the liquidation of defaulting creditors' accounts. In 1906, Banco Nacional do Comércio, along with Banco da Província, participated in the creation of Companhia Força e Luz and Companhia de Seguros Previdência do Sul, both in Porto Alegre.

From 1915, the firm began to establish branches in other locations such as Santa Catarina, Mato Grosso and Paraná. By 1919, it had fifteen agencies throughout Rio Grande do Sul. Unlike other banks at the time, it refused to expand throughout the country, restricting itself to the southern region. The company's main activity involved commerce and industry, but it also operated in the public sector, providing credit support to the Municipal Intendency of Rio Grande. In 1917, it was renamed Banco Nacional do Comércio. Alongside Banco da Província and Banco Pelotense, it was a shareholder and co-founder of Companhia de Fumos Santa Cruz in 1918.

On January 2, 1945, the company celebrated its 50th anniversary; Albino Chaves de Souza, Salathiel Soares de Barros, Jorge Bento and Joaquim José de Brito were the directors in charge. At the time, it had 89 branches throughout Rio Grande do Sul and neighboring states. At the end of 1965, the majority of its shares were acquired by Montepio da Família Militar. At the beginning of 1967 it was the first bank in Rio Grande do Sul authorized to receive FGTS deposits. In 1973, together with Banco da Província and Banco Industrial e Comercial, it became part of Banco Sulbrasileiro.

Its former headquarters, located in the center of Porto Alegre, have held the offices of several banks, including Banco Meridional. Since the 2000s, it has been the seat of Santander Cultural.

== See also ==
- History of Caxias do Sul
- Dante Alighieri Square
