= History of Caxias do Sul =

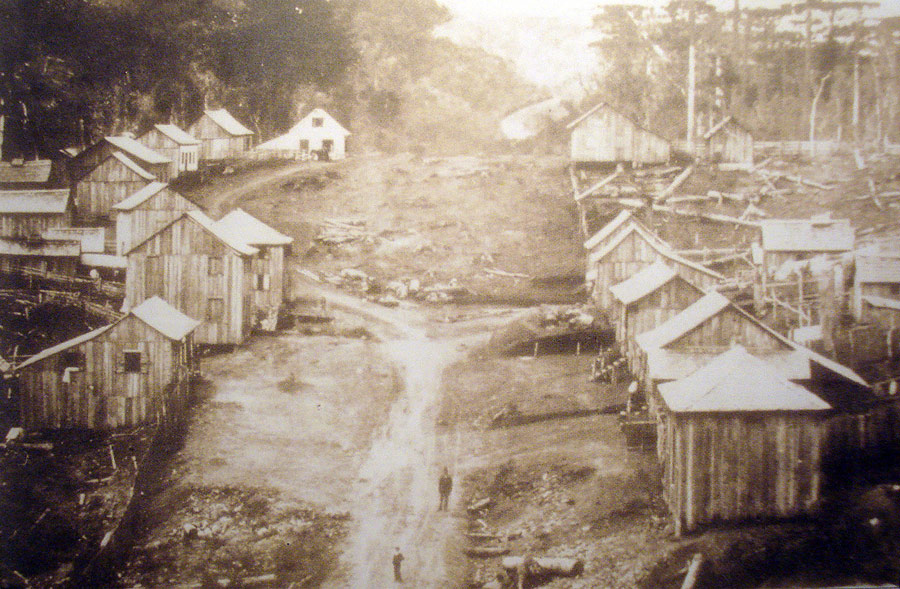
The early urban nucleus of Caxias do Sul, the Sede Dante, around 1876–77.

The history of Caxias do Sul, one of the main municipalities in the state of Rio Grande do Sul in Brazil, officially begins with the Italian colonization of the region, which started in 1875. However, indigenous tribes had lived there since ancient times, but were displaced to make way for the European settlers. The beginning of the settlement was difficult, being an area of thick virgin forest. However, quickly the forest was opened up and the first crops and livestock began to bear fruit. In 1890 trade was already flourishing and industries started to multiply. The primitive village, at the time a district of São Sebastião do Caí, was already showing signs of self-sufficiency enough to be emancipated, becoming a village governed by a provisional Council, and soon by a Municipal council and an Intendancy.

== Overview ==
The first decades of the new municipality were turbulent. Settler groups came from various regions of Italy, some even from other countries, and had often conflicting worldviews and interests. At the same time, the state political context was agitated by constant ideological and partisan disputes, which had repercussions in the colonial area. Many episodes of violence and disagreement occurred, and the power structure proved unstable. In the midst of the disparities, the Catholic religion, common to all, revealed itself as a powerful gathering element, through which the divergences converged for the achievement of collective purposes, the Church acquiring a great influence in the destiny of the city for many decades.

At the beginning of the 20th century, society had already been structured, the initial difficulties related to survival had been overcome, and a solid cultural body began to form through the activity of artists, intellectuals, journalists, and other actors. Several social, recreational and sports clubs were founded, education improved, the urban nucleus grew rapidly and was embellished by monuments and stylish buildings, the urban infrastructure gained body, industry and commerce were solidly based in a network of cooperatives and associations, and the rural area developed great productivity, beginning a phase of important exports of a variety of fresh and processed products. In the political sphere, disputes continued, although the crises were less frequent and less dramatic. The result of this period is the formation of a differentiated and original local culture, in a mixture of Italian and Brazilian elements, in which the awareness of an inheritance from the ancient Italian civilization and the progress achieved become a reason for pride and self-affirmation.

With the establishment of the Estado Novo the federal government imposed a rapid "Brazilianment" of the region and began a process of repression and suppression of the signs of "Italianness". The compulsory cultural uprooting generated a deep identity crisis for the locals, which would only begin to be overcome in the 1950s. At this point, Caxias had already become one of the most important cities in the state, with a strong and diversified economy and a culture in full expansion. The colonial world had been left behind. The growth of the city started to attract migrants from the countryside and other parts of the state in search of new opportunities, and at the same time, the typical problems of the big cities started to appear, with strong social stratification and income inequality.

Since then the pace of growth only accelerated, with its positive and negative aspects, and its population, with a continuous influx of large groups of diverse origins, became highly heterogeneous, leaving the descendants of Italians in a minority. Today, Caxias do Sul has more than 470,000 inhabitants and is one of Brazil's biggest cities. Much of its past has been lost by the dissolution of old traditions, by the demolition of most of its primitive architectural patrimony, and by the cosmopolitanism that prevails today. However, a large group of researchers is engaged in studying the local history and preserving what still remains of material and immaterial testimonies of this history, and official institutions are beginning to realize the importance of rescuing the collective memory through museums, archives, protection of historical buildings, and promotion of cultural activities that revisit the past and try to integrate it with the present.

== Early colonization ==
=== "Ethnic cleansing" in Southern Brazil ===
Inhabited since immemorial times by nomadic Kaingang indigenous people. In the XVII century, the region where Caxias do Sul would be born was visited by Jesuit missionaries, who tried to found missions there, but without success. The presence of Father Cristóvão de Mendoza, who was killed by the natives in 1635, was registered in the district of Santa Lúcia do Piaí. A little before 1790, the lands where today is the Fazenda Souza district were occupied by Inácio Souza Corrêa, a soldier of the Santo Antônio da Patrulha detachment, who founded an estancia for breeding mules. But the effective settlement would only gain momentum with the arrival of waves of Italian immigrants from 1875. For the settlement to occur, the Indians who occupied the area were violently displaced by the action of killers of indigenous called "bugreiros".

=== The crisis in Italy and the Brazilian context ===
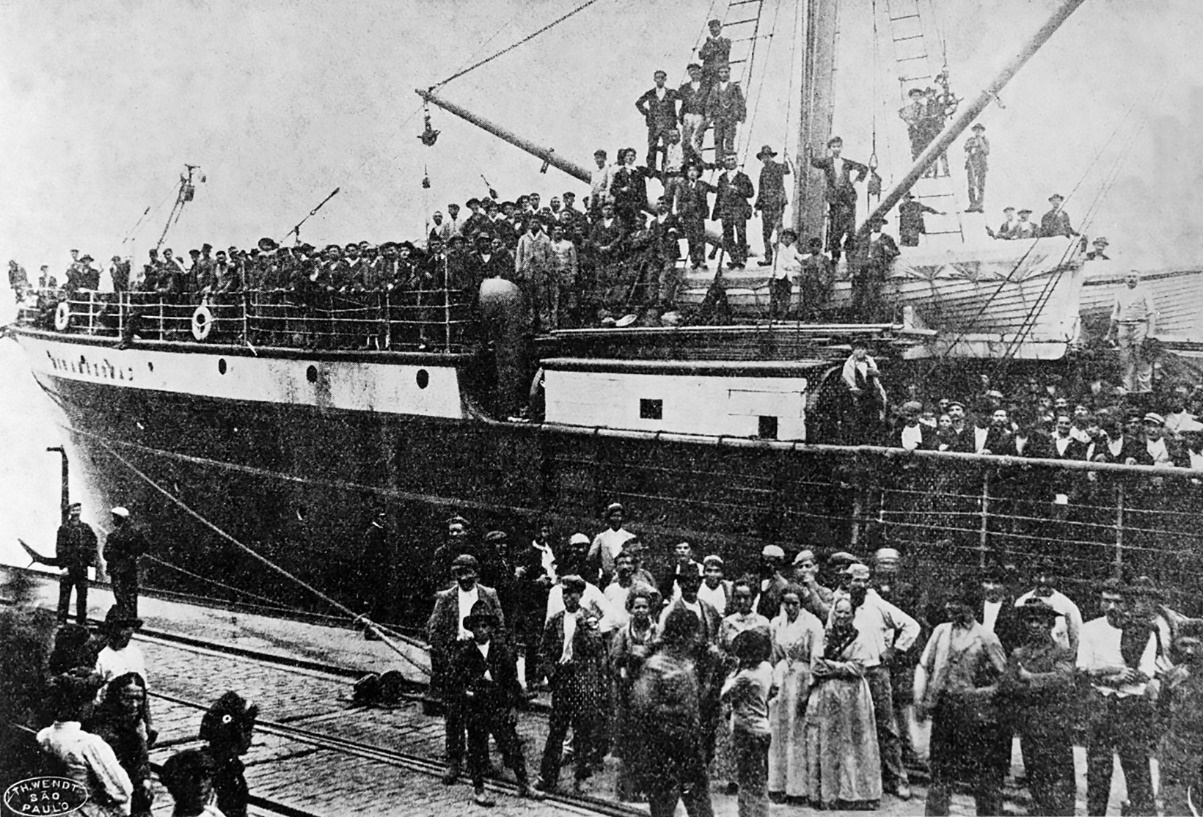
Ship with Italian immigrants arriving in Brazil

In the early 1870s, Italy, still suffering from the problems of the Wars of Unification, began to face the consequences of the worldwide economic recession of 1873–74. In addition, unfavorable competition with grain produced in North America disrupted the Italian agricultural economy, causing rural exodus, a decline in craft trades and food production, and the emergence of a surplus population in the cities with no qualifications for urban work. The result was famine and impoverishment, and the solution found was emigration.

In Brazil at the time, the slave system was being undermined with the prohibition of the slave trade in 1850 and the promulgation of the Rio Branco Law in 1871, causing the reduction of cheap labor supply, generating the idea of employing free workers in a productive model of small family farms. However, the settlers had to be white, to "whiten" the country's population. Brazil had already encouraged German immigration before, and the initiative was considered a success. In 1870, the Imperial Government had handed over to the Provincial Government a large area of unoccupied land in the high mountains of northeastern Rio Grande do Sul with the intention of populating it. In the same year, the demarcation of the new Conde d'Eu and Princesa Isabel colonies began, and in 1871, two firms were hired to look for candidates (up to forty thousand colonists over ten years), mainly Germans and Austrians: Caetano Pinto & Irmão, and Holtzweissig & Co. But, by the end of the 19th century, the political situation had changed and the difficulties imposed by the new Brazilian and German legislation no longer attracted Germans and Northerns. The initial objectives were not fulfilled, and the rate of immigration was much lower than expected. Thus, Italy, which at this time was facilitating the departure of a large population, became the preferred country for the search of settlers.

Driven by the desire of "far l'America" ("to make America"), and deluded by the promises of the Brazilian government and the legends about the Cockaigne, an imaginary country full of easy riches that was identified with Brazil, great waves of Italians began to arrive in the country in the precarious conditions of overcrowded ships where deaths from hunger and disease were common. Initially, they were destined for the coffee plantations in São Paulo, and after the demarcation of the colonies in Rio Grande do Sul, the surplus was being sent there. They entered the state via the Rio Grande river and disembarked in Porto Alegre, where they stayed at the "Immigrants' House" until they took smaller boats to São Sebastião do Caí, from where they continued on foot, in carts, or on horseback to the top of the mountains.

=== The arrival and settlement of immigrants ===
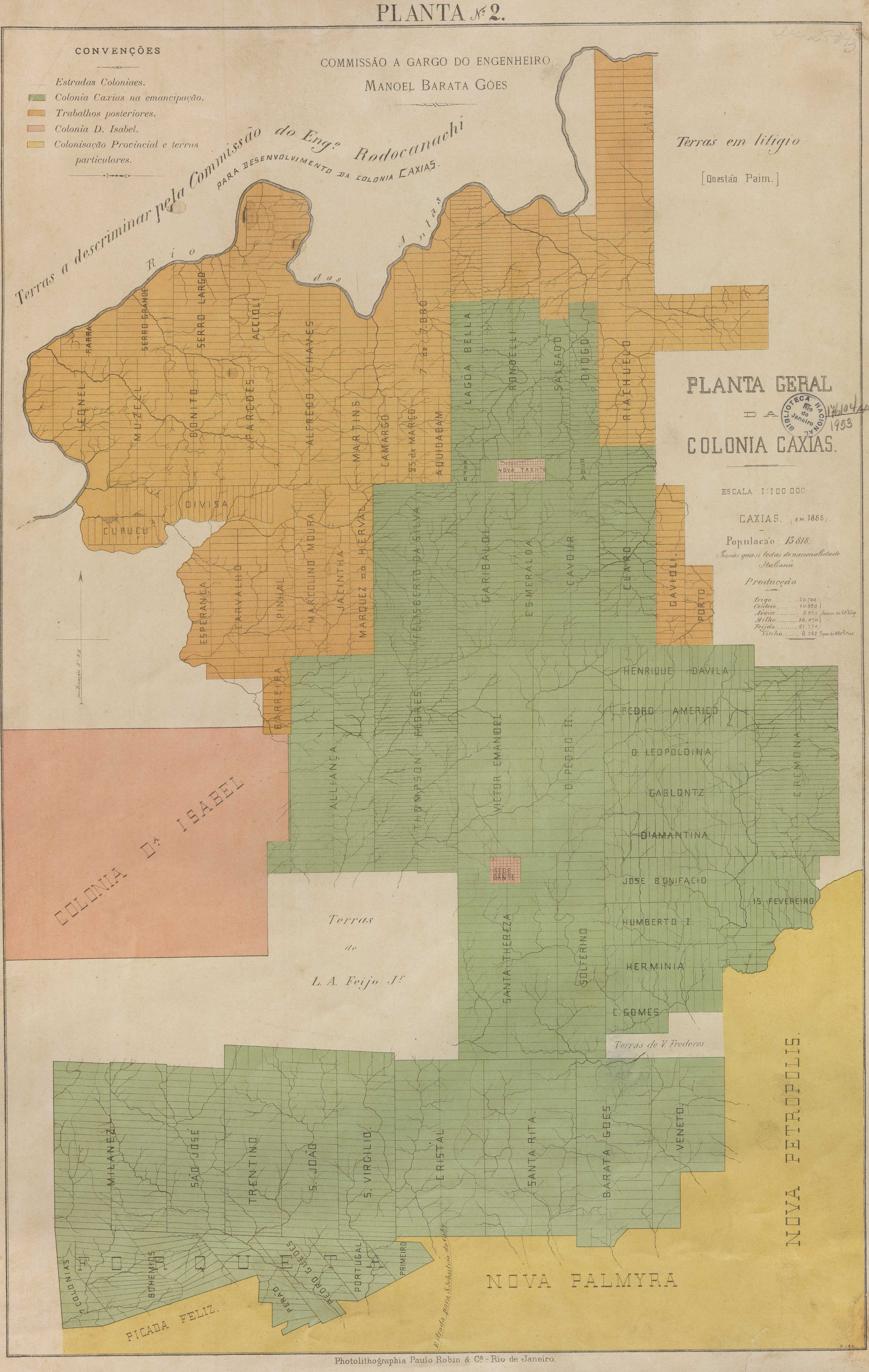
Plan of the colony in Caxias (in green), from 1885.

After an exploratory expedition headed by Luiz Antônio Feijó Júnior, in 1874 a new colonial nucleus was created with about 15 square leagues to the east of the Conde d'Eu and Princesa Isabel colonies, initially called Colônia a Fundos de Nova Palmira, which was the origin of the city of Caxias do Sul, and whose headquarters was then located in Nova Milano. The first Italian settlers headed to this new destination began to arrive in 1875. The immigrants' way from Caí was through the "Picada dos Boêmios", a trail opened in 1872 by some immigrants from Bohemia who were already living within the limits of the colony. After the ascent, they were installed in a collective shed in Nova Milano, waiting for the distribution, by the Land Commission officials, of the lots, seeds, and basic tools for agricultural work, which could take months to happen.

The occupation of the current urban region of Caxias do Sul in the new headquarters founded in Travessão Santa Teresa, the so-called Sede Dante, around the current Dante Alighieri square, only began on 30 May 1876. Another early settlement center was the São Romédio Community, considered the cradle of the city, where a more or less independent communal life was first structured, founded at the end of 1876, and where to this day the São Romédio Church is located, a historical and cultural heritage of the state and center of community life.

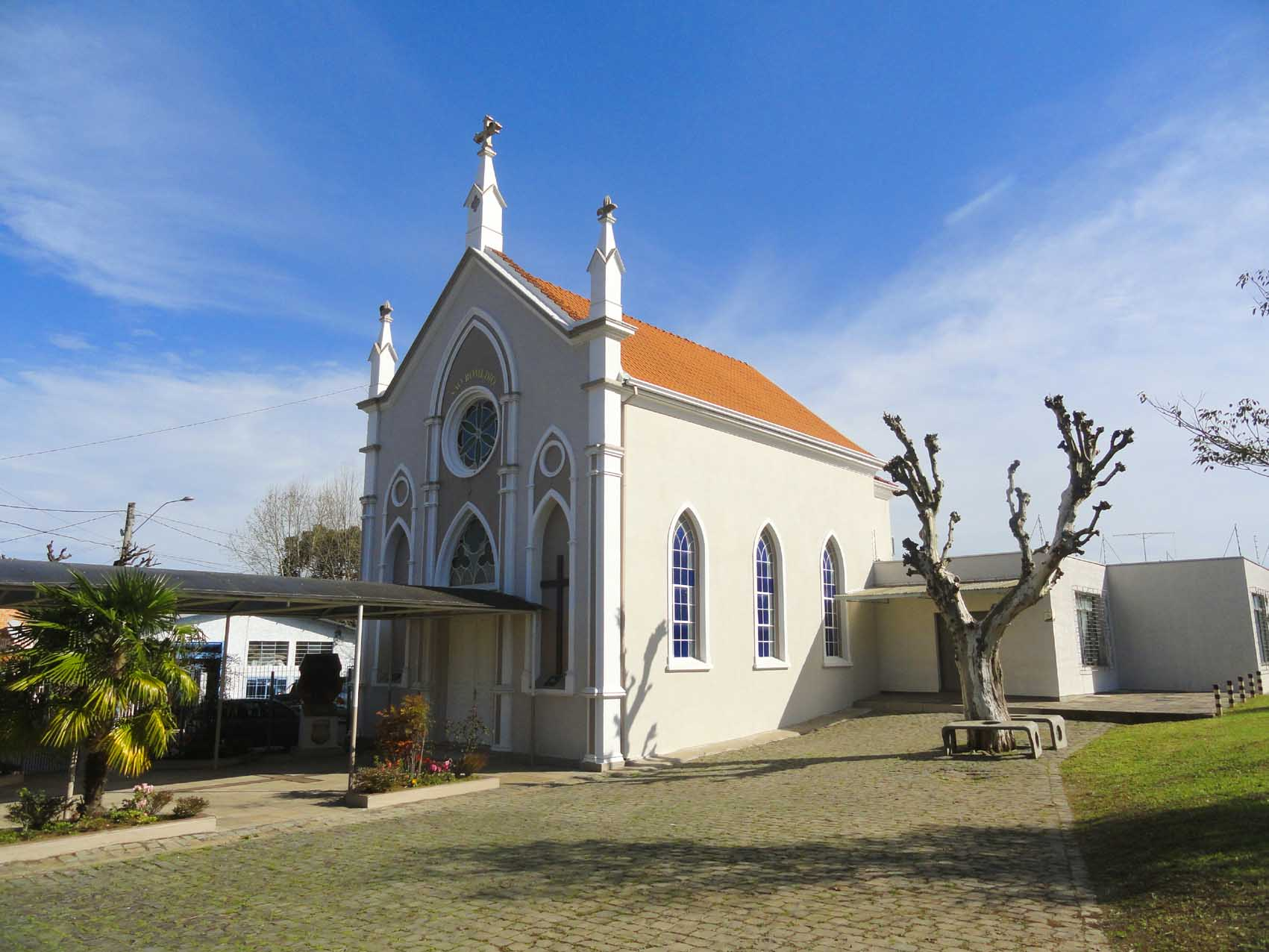
The Church of São Romédio.

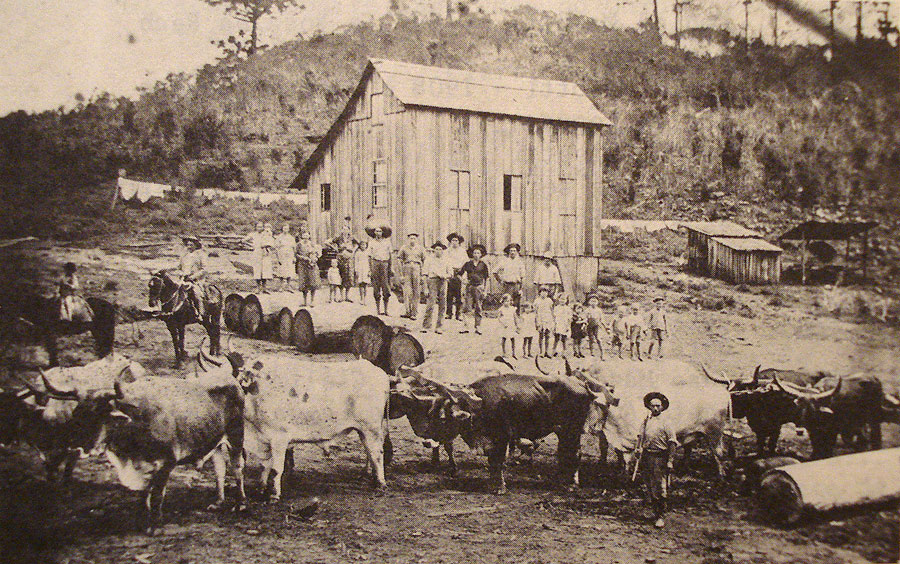
Property of Italo Masotti in the countryside, late 19th century.

They were mostly young families from the Veneto region, making up about 71% of the total. Approximately 23% of them were Austrians from the Tyrol (Trento region), 2% Brazilians, and the rest from other origins such as France, Spain, and England. The lots were chosen by the immigrants themselves from among those available, were not free, and had to be repaid to the government in a few years. Once the choice was made, they received a provisional ownership title and moved to other shacks in the "crossings" or "lines", the first roads, and began the work of their settlement, cutting down the forest, building the house, and planting the first subsistence crops. While the house was not ready and agriculture did not bear its fruits, their sustenance came from gathering, hunting, selling wood, some official aid in cash and food, and from working for the government, taking part in the demarcation of new lots and the opening of roads. However, not all were farmers, a portion of the immigrants practiced trades and moved to the urban centers. The farmers established residence in the rural area, on the land received, and those who had more resources also acquired plots in the Sede. In 1877, when the area was named "Colônia Caxias", there were already about two thousand people settled.

The organization of the farm was extremely simple. A rustic wooden house, sometimes of adobe or stone, divided into a large kitchen where the focolaro (the heating fire) was located, a living room, a few bedrooms, and an attic or basement for storage. Next to it were a stable, a gunroom, a pigsty, and a chicken coop. Often the kitchen was located in a separate room from the main body of the house, because the fire was kept burning all day long. A vegetable garden was also planted, in addition to the main crops. As slave labor was forbidden in the colony, (Note: The colony was founded in 1875, still under the Brazilian slave regime, which was abolished in 1888. There were many slaves in Rio Grande do Sul, but government orders prohibited their employment in the colony.) all activities were carried out by the family. The initial establishment was not easy and poverty was the rule.

The virgin land proved fertile, and soon provided good harvests of potatoes, beans, cassava, peanuts, pumpkins, tomatoes, peppers, wheat, and corn, and with the raising of pig, chicken, and cattle. The tropeiros, with their caravans contributed to trade, as did the Germans from São Sebastião do Caí, who had already developed an efficient network of warehouses, facilitating the flow of the first agricultural products such as honey, wine, grappa, sausages, lard, flour, and cheese, and the exchange for other goods, thus stimulating incipient industrialization. The result of this activity could be seen in 1881 with the first Agro-Industrial Fair, the origin of the modern Festa da Uva, which was installed in the building of the Land Commission Board, bringing together in one main event the various festivities commemorating the harvests held sparsely by the settlers.

The town grew rapidly; in 1883 it already had a population of 7,359, and there were 93 commercial establishments, among pottery shops, markets, metalworking shops, carpentry, goldsmith's, and blacksmith's shops, mills, shoe and tailor's shops, which made the colony practically self-sufficient. Soon subsistence polyculture was losing space to monocultures of grapes, wheat, and flax with a commercial view. Silkworm breeding and the industry of processing agricultural products were also growing. Despite this, part of the settlers, especially those in the rural areas farthest from the headquarters, faced the problem of isolation and with it the difficulty of marketing their products. Although the food was plentiful, they lacked everything else, causing the Italian Consul to visit the colony in 1905 and be shocked at their appearance.

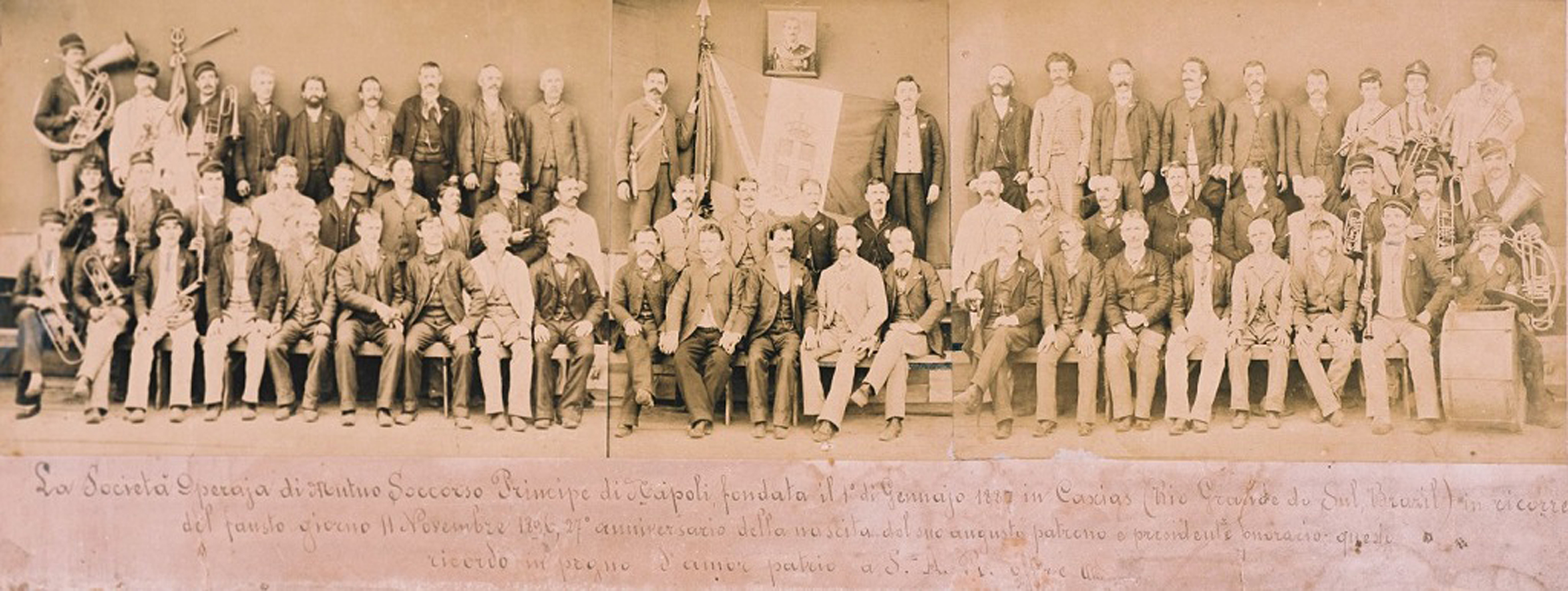
The Prince of Naples Society, incorporated on 11 November 1896, on the occasion of the 27th birthday of its patron, Victor Emmanuel of Italy. The society was the flagship of several mutual aid organizations founded by immigrants in the region to help overcome difficulties that were common to all, to foster Italian culture, and to strengthen the sense of collective unity. Click on the image to read the caption with the names of the members.

=== First administrations and conflicts ===
The Sede Dante had much smaller lots than those in the rural area and, at first, was only intended for the installation of the Land Board, but soon became the center of urbanization and commerce, and its area had to be expanded. The settlement plan was developed following a previous orthogonal grid layout, like a chessboard, the so-called "Roman grid". This model did not prove to be the most appropriate for the region, full of uneven terrain, and urbanization was almost always very difficult and expensive, which later made the intendant José Penna de Moraes call the project a "Minotaur", which "devoured" the budget.

The political life of Caxias do Sul, despite its relative isolation until the beginning of the 20th century, was very busy and sometimes violent. On 12 April 1884, it ceased to be a settlement and was emancipated, taking the name "Freguesia de Santa Tereza de Caxias", linked to São Sebastião do Caí, having João Muratore as its first district administrator. Thus, it was already an autonomous parish and would become, in August of the same year, head of a judicial district. By this time, it already had 10,500 inhabitants.

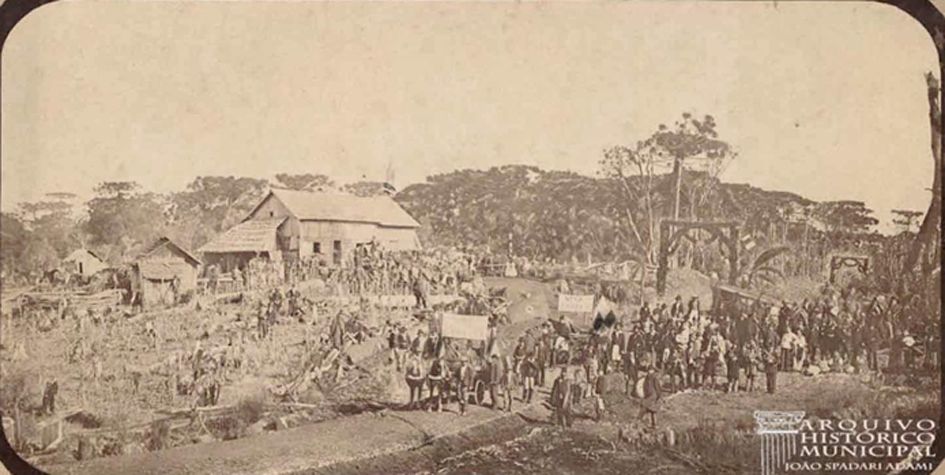
Official delegation arriving from Porto Alegre for the installation of the Governing Board in 1890.

On 20 June 1890, it was elevated to the condition of village, with the name "Vila de Santa Tereza de Caxias", and needed a legal organization to manage itself. In an ordinance of 28 June, the state government appointed a Governing Board to administer the municipality, integrated by Ernesto Marsiaj, Angelo Chitolina, and Salvador Sartori, who concentrated the legislative and executive powers. This board, after several changes in its composition, ended its activities on 15 December 1891, when the first Municipal Council was sworn in.

Between the election on 20 October and the inauguration of the Council, occurred the first popular uprising of the colony, the Revolt of the Colonists, in protest against the political orientation of the administrators, the collection of late taxes with fines and interest, and the terrible condition of the roads. The climate remained tense and another revolt took place the following year, involving 300 seditious people, who took over the municipal administration and installed in power a Revolutionary Board, composed of Luiz Pieruccini, Domingos Maineri, and Vicente Rovea, leaders of the movement, being supported by the police delegate Francisco Januário Salerno, who appointed himself as Intendant. The outraged Council complains to the state government, which appoints on 5 July 1892, the first Municipal Intendant, Antônio Xavier da Luz. The rebels surrender and order returns to the city. Thus, on 12 October 1892, the municipality was constituted, the Council was definitively and solemnly reappointed, and soon its Organic law and the Code of Postures were approved, providing for a multitude of aspects of municipal life, such as the public decorum of the citizens, the maintenance of order, the boundaries of the municipality and its urban layout, hygiene and public health, and more.

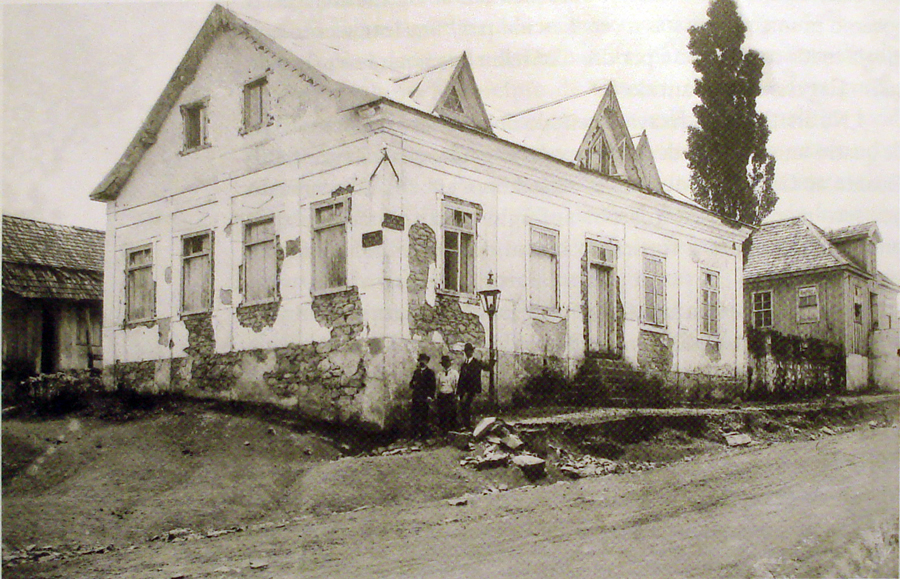
Land Commission Board building, targeted by the revolutionaries. The building dates from 1883 and was the first masonry building in the city. Photo by D. Mancuso in the Arquivo Histórico Municipal João Spadari Adami (AHM).

Shortly afterward, on 30 June 1894, the Federalist Revolution reached Caxias do Sul and left a trail of destruction. The city was invaded by 400 revolutionaries commanded by Belisário Baptista de Almeida Soares, who looted the commerce and attacked public buildings, forcing the population to take refuge in the countryside. The local presence of Freemasons and Carbonari also caused riots and violence especially against the religious, setting traps for them, assaults, and assassination attempts, thus dividing the community and forcing some of the first priests to carry guns or move to other places. Antonio Passaggi, the first chaplain of the colony, was on one occasion the victim of a trap, when anticlerical individuals arranged a fake wedding between two men, one of them in drag. When the plot was discovered, the priest was punished, stripped of his functions, and deprived of holy orders by the bishop, while the real culprits remained free. In 1898, Father Pietro Nosadini, who had already been kidnapped and almost killed in 1897, wrote an open letter to the government denouncing the slander that involved him in the attempt on the life of the Intendant José Cândido de Campos Júnior, and other facts revealing the climate of intrigue, animosity, and incomprehension that reigned between the church and local politicians. Peace was only established when Father Antonio Pertile took over the direction of the parish, whose tombstone bears the title Pacificatore di Caxias. These various conflicts, besides their specific and punctual characteristics, were also a reflection of the intense struggle for power at the state level, where currents of republicans and federalists fought, each subdivided by influences of divergent ideologies of conservatives, liberals, Catholics, Freemasons, and other interest groups, making the state one of the most unstable areas in Brazil at this time, and making the passage from the 19th to the 20th century the most turbulent period in Caxias' history.

== Culture and society in the early days of the colony ==
=== Family, Work, and Religion ===
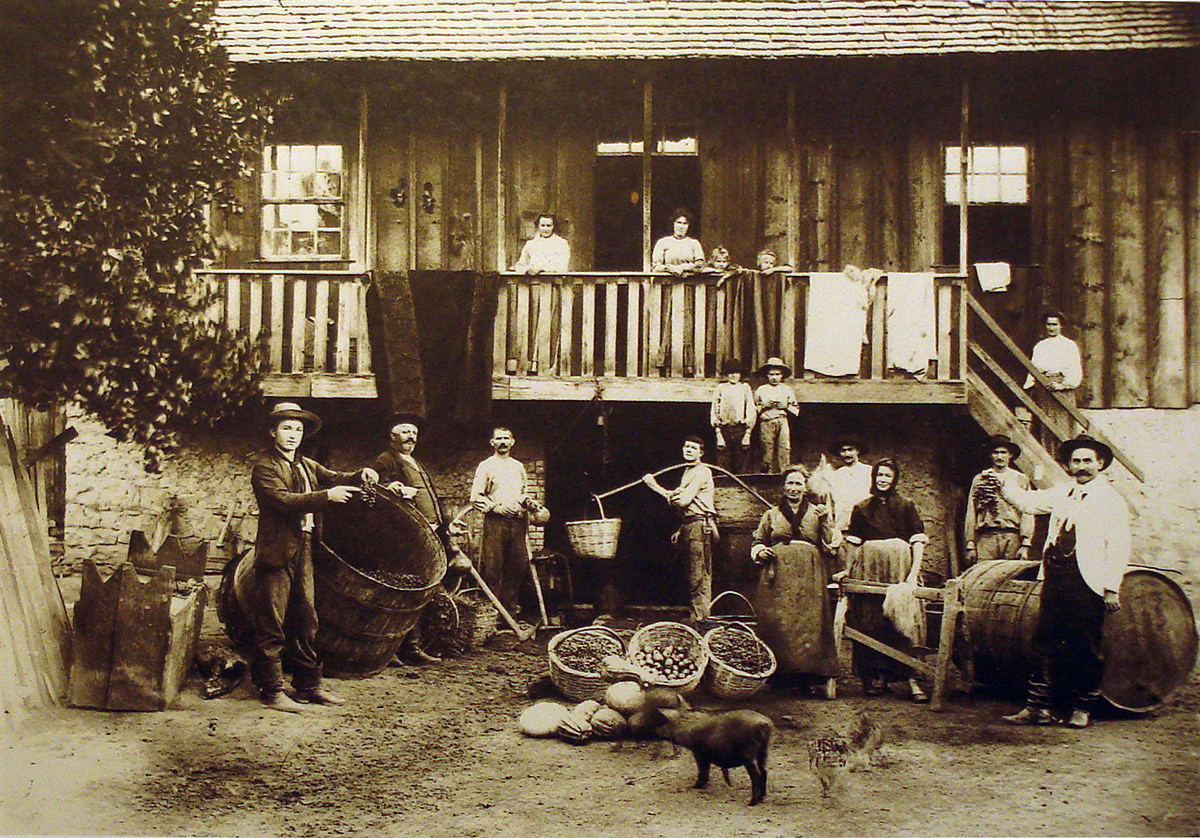
Boff family displaying their products in Ana Rech, rural area of Caxias do Sul, 1904. Photo from AHM.

The society of the city at its foundation was structured around the family nucleus and the Italian culture brought with the immigrants, strongly marked by Catholicism. The concern with subsistence was the determining factor of time organization, leaving little for educational and cultural activities, although the lack of schools in the colony was criticized from the beginning. Dedication to work was a fundamental value, but the agricultural techniques brought from Italy did not serve well the different climate and geography of southern Brazil, and the adaptation of the traditional Italian agrarian culture to an acclimated substitute did not take place without difficulties.

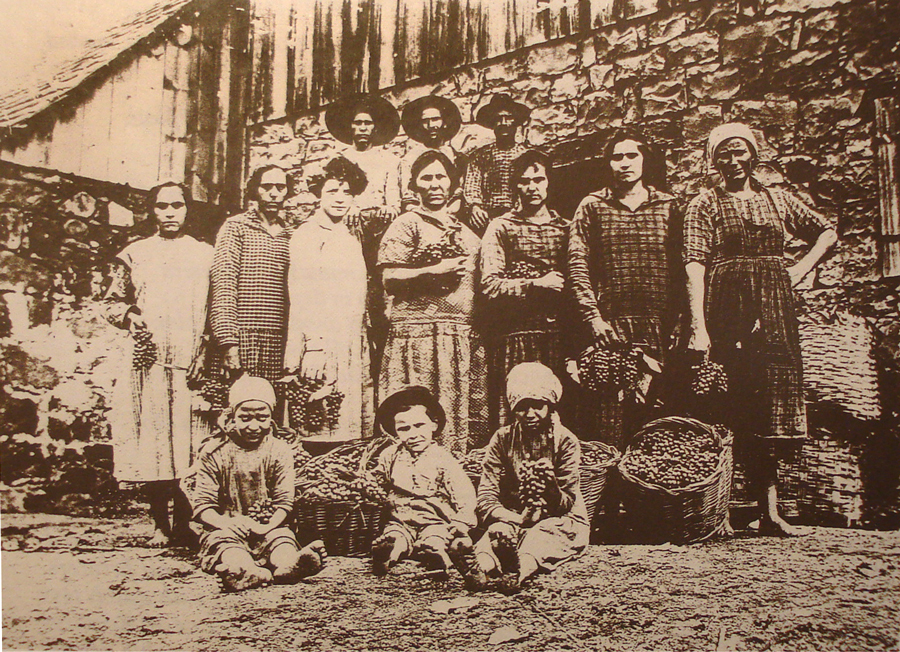
Women's work, c. 1910.

The man was the leader of the family and distributed the functions of each member of the family group. He, the "boss-father," and his older sons were responsible for the heavier work of carpentry and blacksmithing, and for clearing the forest and opening crops, which, together with the vegetable gardens and the animal husbandry, were later left mainly to the wife and the younger sons and daughters, who were used to the hard work on the land from morning to night. And as their survival depended on them, families tended to be numerous to have more hands for work. The small profits were saved for the purchase of land to guarantee the future of the descendants or invested in small domestic industry.

This hierarchical and patriarchal system of family production would be continued into the 20th century, when survival, in the face of a savage nature, was no longer an urgent threat. The woman had a subordinate role, which, although little recognized, was basic as a helper at work and as the agglutinating center of the family, where the whole of that primitive society was structured. She was the "reproductive matrix", necessary to increase the number of family members available for work, she was also in charge of the children's elementary education, of the initial religious instruction, and performed important socializing functions. She was the mediator figure per excellence, calming conflicts, facilitating solidarity between generations and contact between the various groups of settlers. It was also due to the women, mainly the grandmothers, the preservation of oral tradition, in the transmission of traditions that are still cultivated today in some parts of the city, teaching successive generations songs, sacred and profane legends, handicraft, children's games, and the typical cuisine of the region. This patriarchal model was repeated in the urban area as it grew, with its diverse trades and demands.

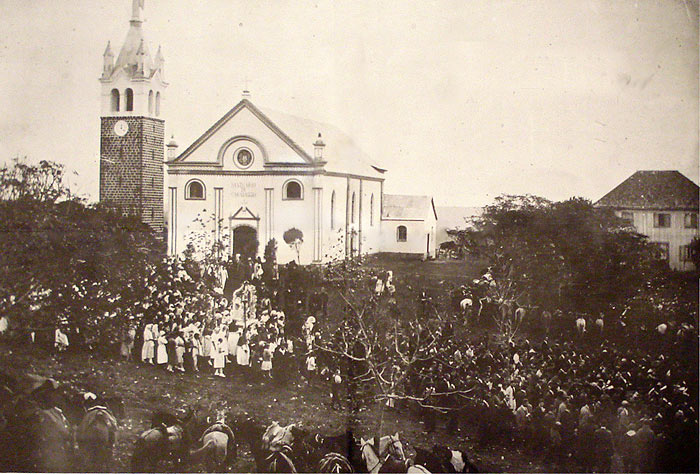
The Sanctuary of Our Lady of Caravaggio, today in the municipality of Farroupilha, typifies the Italian colonial chapel. AHM photo, the 1920s–30s.

However, the greatest unifying force among the first settlers was the Catholic religion. Coming from a country that had just been unified, there was no common sense of homeland among them, they differed "nationally" according to the region they came from. Nor did the language brought from Italy serve as a common link, since they spoke different Italic dialects, some almost completely incomprehensible to each other. Religion, the only element shared by all, worked as an integrating bridge between the groups. As Olívio Manfroi stated, "the religious expression, in its daily and festive manifestations, was the most significant sign of the cultural universe of the Italian immigrants. It was the first and indispensable reference of affiliation to the group. [...] It was through the Catholic religion that the Italian immigrant found himself and others."

Therefore, such culture was based on religious references, and the chapels became very important, growing in number and centralizing the parties and group celebrations. The chapel was the social center around which the urbanization of the districts and the municipal seat began, and around it appear the party hall, the sports fields, the bowling alleys, the schools, and the commerce. Until today, the Diocese of Caxias do Sul has 678 chapels under its jurisdiction, which aggregate a large human contingent in the rural area. In most of them, there was no permanent priest, and the worship was conducted by lay people who had some knowledge of ecclesiastical Latin and the rites and traditions. It was this figure who catechized, led the communal recitation of the rosary, said the funeral prayers, baptized, blessed the crops and the sick, and in some cases even celebrated Sunday mass.

These heterodox customs, born spontaneously from popular need, given the scarcity of priests to serve a vast territory, soon came into conflict with the regularly established ecclesiastical authority, but the role of the "lay priest" in the colonizing society was of enormous importance. Even when itinerant priests came to the aid of the faithful, there was little adherence to orthodoxy. The chronicles of these missionaries lament that the people took a great part in religious festivities, but shunned confession and communion. Nevertheless, in 1893, the Church was able to begin the construction of the Cathedral of Caxias do Sul, today the seat of the Bishopric, thanks to the joint effort of the immigrant community, which worked on the construction for free and paid out the high sum of 150 contos de réis up to the date of its inauguration in 1899, when all the façade covering and internal decorations were still missing. At the solemn consecration of the temple on 15 October 1900, Bishop Ponce de Leão confirmed 5,000 people.

Religion was also responsible for the appearance of the first artistic manifestations of the colony, and from the beginning, a few craftsmen carved statues and altars and painted devotional images. Among them were Tarquinio Zambelli, Francisco Meneguzzo, and Pietro Stangherlin, leaving significant work in many churches and chapels in the region and others preserved today in the Municipal Museum of Caxias do Sul.

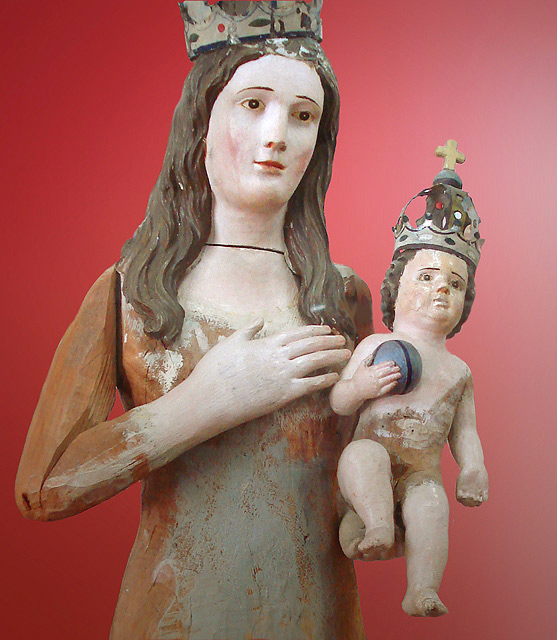
Taquinio Zambelli: Nossa Senhora da Misericórdia com o Menino, 1885. Municipal Museum

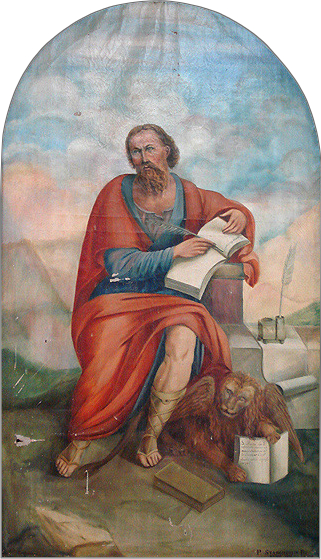
Pietro Stangherlin: São Marcos evangelista, 1890. Municipal Museum

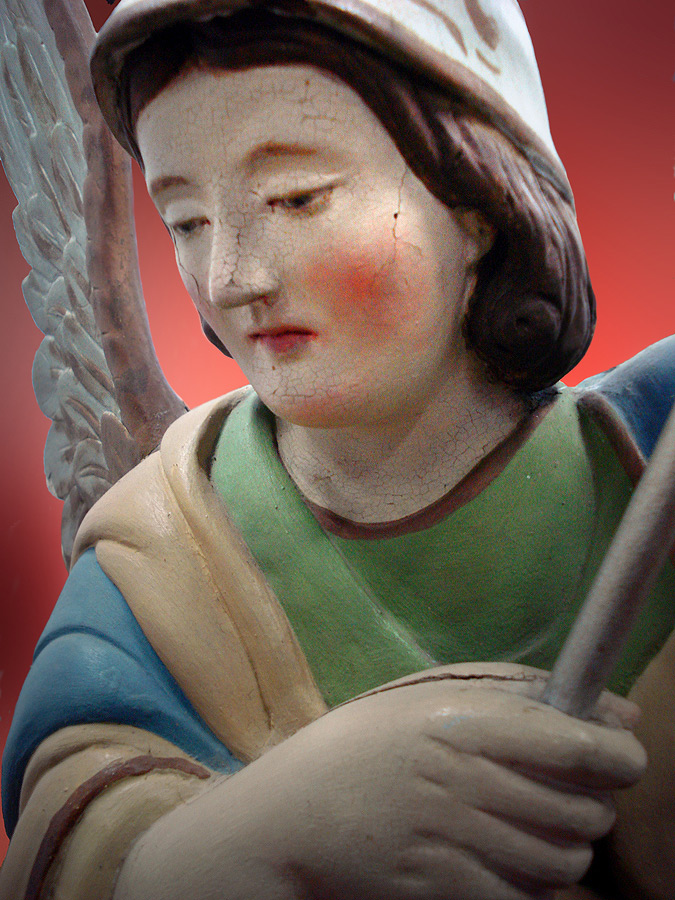
Pietro Stangherlin: São Miguel, detail. Municipal Museum

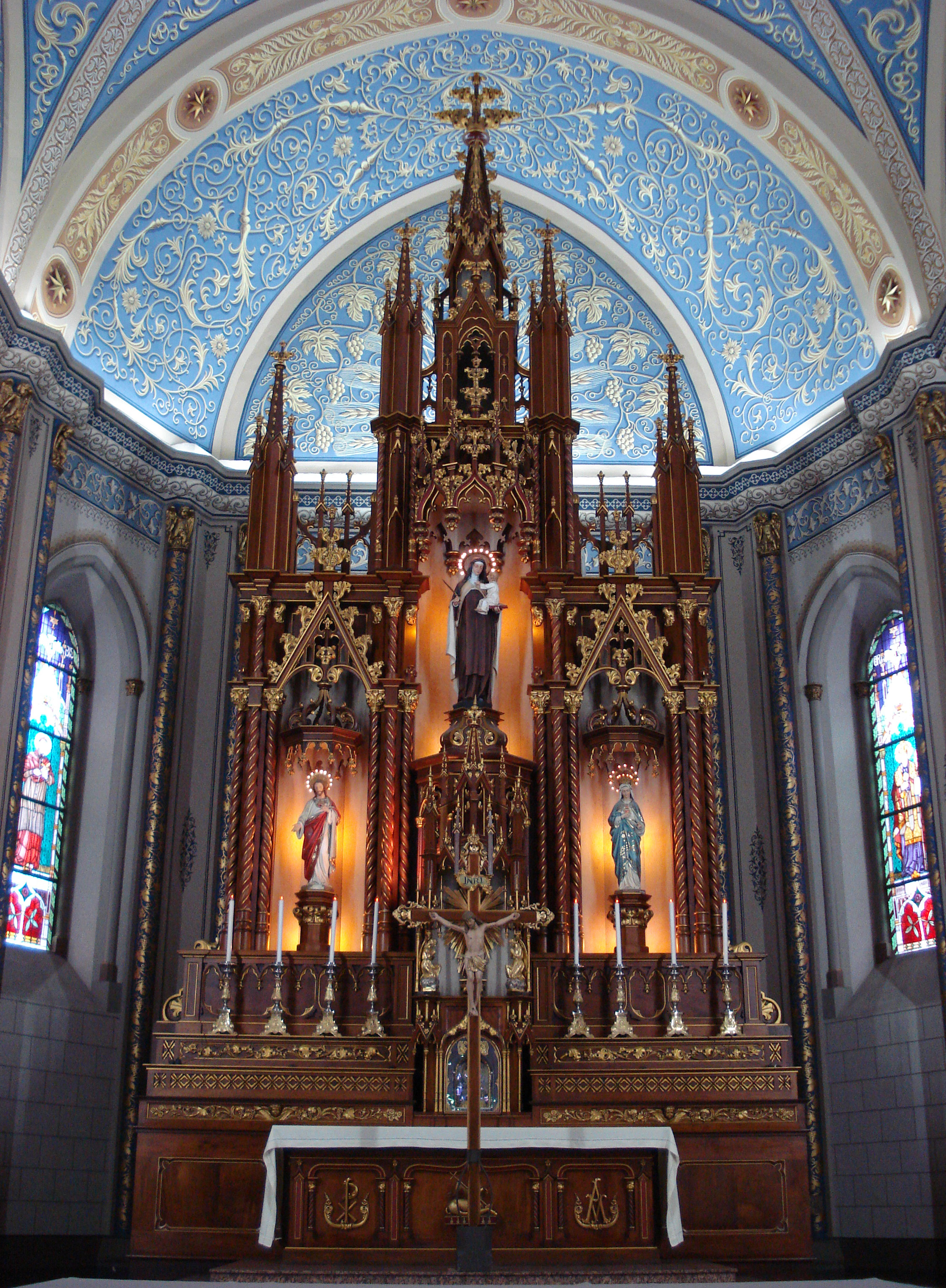
Francisco Meneguzzo: altar of the Cathedral, c. 1913

=== Language and education ===
The Italians spoke a diversity of dialects from their provinces of origin, and the relative isolation of the colony and the coexistence between groups of different origins, over time, gave birth to a new dialect, Talian, a kind of lingua franca that incorporated elements of the Italian dialects and Portuguese. The progressive loss of contact with Italy and the cessation of the arrival of new immigrants at the turn of the century favored, even more, the dissemination of this new way of speaking, which began to be used at all times, orally or in writing, and would have a predominant use in the region until the Second World War. At this time, "Italianisms" were severely repressed by the government and began to decline also due to the increasing integration of the colonies with Brazilian culture and the universalization of public education, among other reasons. However, they did not disappear and are still found today, especially in rural areas. In this linguistic context, the publication between 1924 and 1925 in Talian, of a Feuilleton by the newspaper Staffetta Rio-grandense, that told the story of Nanetto Pipetta (a fictional character created by the friar Aquiles Bernardi that became a symbol of the whole immigration process and a mirror for each immigrant) achieved great repercussions in the colony.

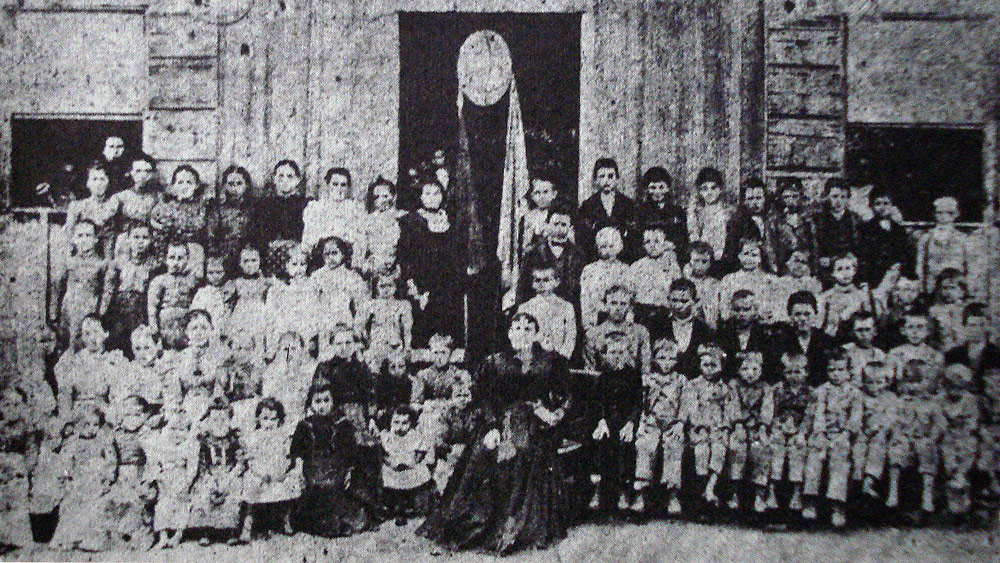
Luíza Morelli Marchioro and her students in front of her home-school.

In the difficult work of founding a new city in an inhospitable environment, formal education had little space and was basically aimed at elementary instruction, without greater pretensions, and as long as the courses did not interfere with work – the priority for everyone. Approximately 80% of the new arrivals were illiterate, but after about two decades the illiteracy rate had fallen to around 30% for men and 70% for women. Even with the initial lack of teachers and schools, a simple educational system was organized as early as 1875, the year the first immigrants arrived, and taught by some of the most educated. Generally, the classes were given in spacious houses, and later in simple schools built for this purpose. Among the first educators whose names are notable were Giacomo Paternoster, the first active professional teacher in the city, Luíza Morelli Marchioro, the Maestra. She became famous in the region, teaching informally in her residence on the 7th Légua since before 1877, when she was hired by the provincial government. Abramo Pezzi also left a notable mark in the early history of education in the Caxias do Sul.

Soon these private schools proliferated, with classes mainly in dialect and Italian and, to a lesser extent, in Portuguese, which few understood, although from the beginning of the regional educational process, it was understood that literacy in the vernacular was an important factor for socialization and success in life. With several requests to the government to open schools in Portuguese being registered, most of the time these requests were not met, hence the provisional and improvised character of the teaching.

The religious orientation of these establishments was also remarkable, many of them functioning in chapels and churches, run by religious or otherwise linked to structured religion. Religious orders, such as the Josephines and the De La Salle Brothers, were responsible for the foundation of schools that today are among the main ones in the city, such as Colégio São José (1901) and Colégio La Salle Carmo (1908). Other schools were maintained by lay associations such as the Prince of Naples Society, important because besides teaching, they promoted Italian culture in general. The Brazilian State did not interfere decisively in this involuntarily ethnic education until the end of the 1920s, when it began to favor a "preventive nationalization" with the opening of several schools only in Portuguese besides the ethnic ones. Teaching in Italian or dialect would only be definitively suppressed in 1938–39, with a sequence of federal decrees that established compulsory nationalization for all and accelerated the process of officialization and laicization of education.

In 2017, the Talian dialect was co-officialized in the municipality of Caxias do Sul, from the decree of the mayor, Felipe Gremelmaier (PMDB).

=== Traditions ===
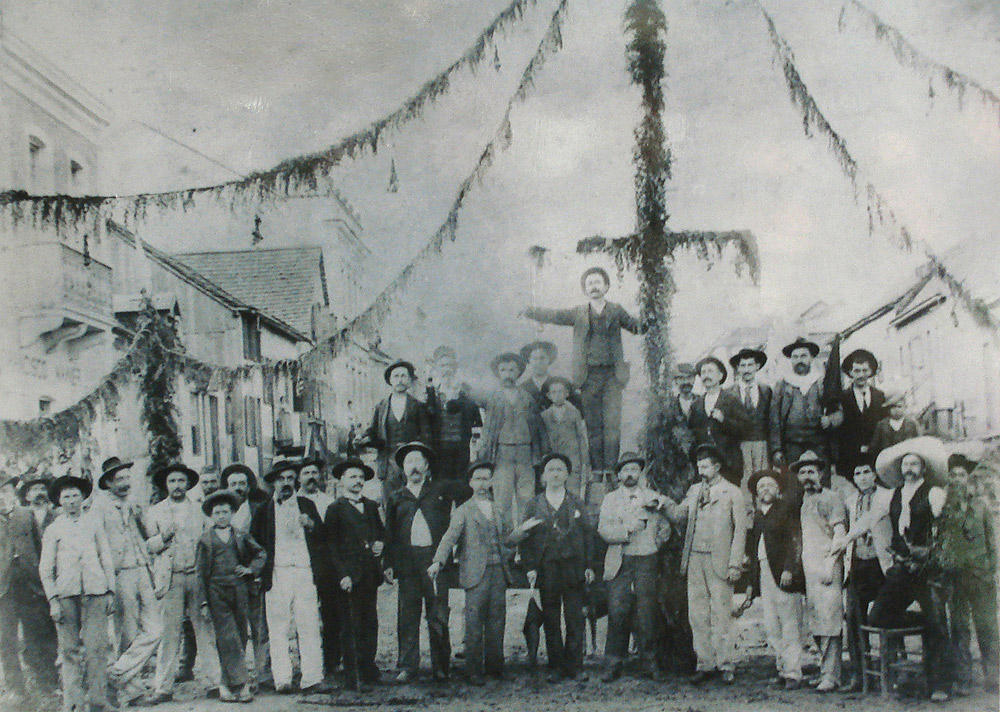
New Year's celebrations 1899

Among the toils of the immigrants' hard-working days, sometime, however little, was dedicated to the cultivation of traditions brought from Europe. Unlike in Italy, where farmers lived in villages with houses near, the paesi, from which they left to work the surrounding fields, in the colony, the dwellings were distant from each other, and the need for social gathering was more pressing.

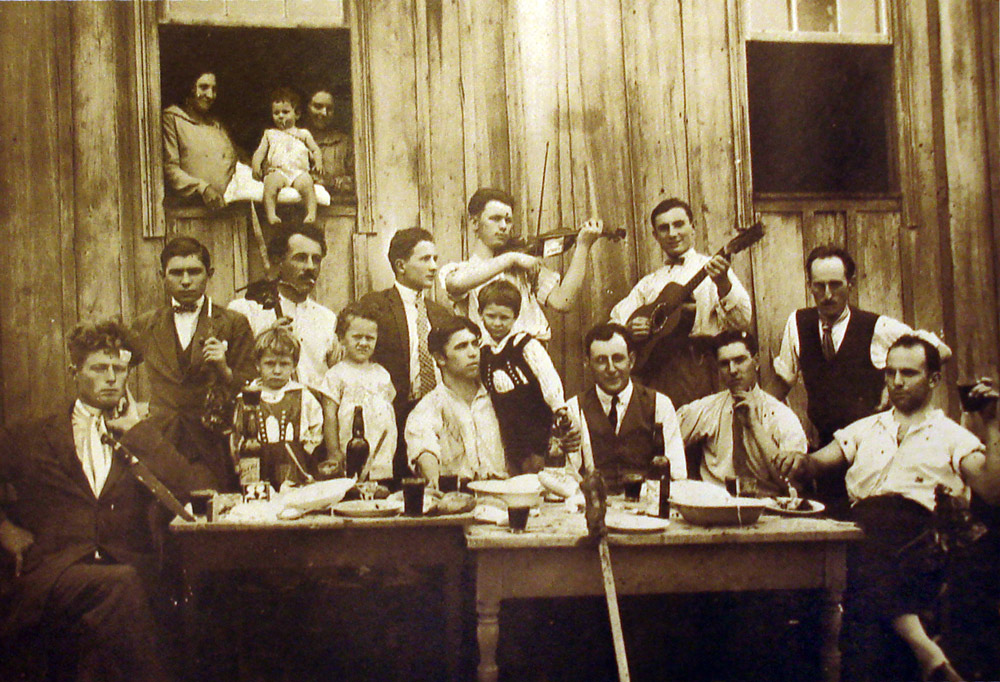
Benvenutti family reunion, 1928.

The filó, the meeting between families, was the privilged moment where this cultivation took place. They happened mainly in the rural areas, on Saturday nights or after Sunday mass, in the home kitchens, or the canteens. The men chatted and played cards, bocce, or "la mora"; the women practiced handicrafts such as crochet, sewing, and the making of dressa, a corn straw braid used to make hats, and exchanged their experiences, while the children played with rustic toys. Amid these meetings, accompanied by a glass of wine, salami, grostoli, bread, and cheese, there would be the singing in choirs, usually, without instrumental accompaniment, of long traditional songs, markedly narrative, that recalled their Italian land, sang their nostalgia for distant relatives, spoke of love and work. Il primo, or the choir's guide, began the verses, and the ensemble completed the stanza.

For Christmas there were special traditions, when large groups went through all the lines and visited every house, singing the songs of the stela and carrying a torch decorated with a paper star – this was the announcement of the new stela, the new star that symbolized the birth of Jesus. On the day of the chapel's patron saint, the sagra took place, another ritual feast also marked by the collective practice of music, but now, when possible, there was a band to accompany. The same happened at weddings, New Year's Eve celebrations, and other important dates.

== The city in the first half of the 20th century ==
=== Economy and infrastructure ===
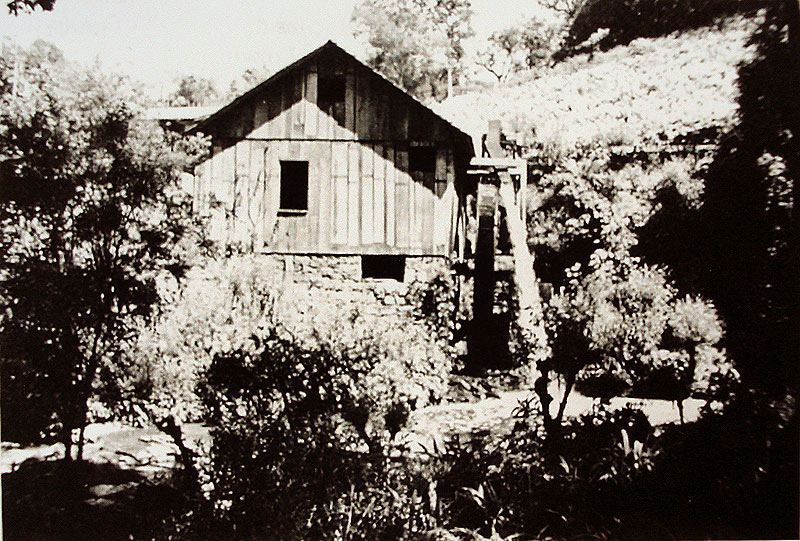
One of the first mills in Caxias do Sul, in the district of São Romédio, owned by Giacomo Clamer, Giovanni Battista Longhi and Giustina Brustolin. 1881.

At the turn of the century, the industrial sector was being structured based on the artisanal micro-industry of transformation of basic food products such as corn and wheat into flour, grapes into wine and grappa, pigs into sausages and lard, and natural products such as the araucaria wood, which was abundant and of excellent quality. The commerce was already showing an expressive development, making these products circulate to the point that commercial contacts for placing Caxias wine were already established with São Paulo by pioneers such as Abramo Eberle. The nickname "Pearl of the Colonies" ("Pérola das Colônias") for which the city is known was given to it by Júlio de Castilhos when he visited in 1890, amazed at the work accomplished in such a short time. In gratitude, in 1893, the municipality named its main street after the politician.

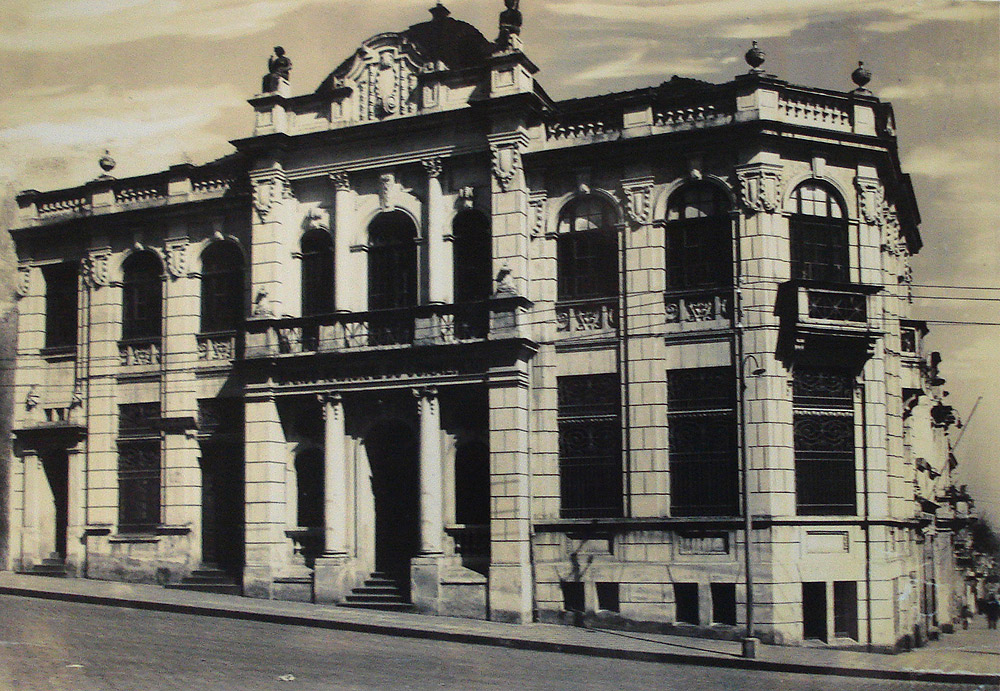
Banco Nacional do Comércio building, 1920s. Photo from AHM.

The century begins with an important event: the founding, in 1901, of the first-class entity in the city, the Chamber of Industry, Commerce and Services of Caxias do Sul, a visible sign of the beginning of the organization of society on a more effective basis. The association played an extremely important role in the whole region and emerged as the largest social force after the Intendency and the Municipal Council of Caxias. It kept a rigid and efficient control over commerce, had a great influence over the constituted power, intervened beneficially in economic crises such as those of 1923 and 1929, and problems of local infrastructure such as the lack of electricity and water, took part in the movement that changed the original route of the BR-116 highway so that it would pass through the city, and took over the direction of the Festa da Uva. It also extended its activities to the assistance area, as when during the Revolution of 1930, it helped the families of the fighters and later on gave subsidies for the implantation of public health and education programs. The association, despite some internal crises and disagreements with the authorities, led all issues that in one way or another concerned the interests of the producing classes, even when dealing with exclusively agricultural or industrial issues, since all productive activities at that stage flowed into the trade.

The telephone had already been introduced in 1895, the telegraph arrived in 1906, and the newspaper La Libertà began its publication (in Italian) in 1909, taking the city out of its relative isolation. Charitable associations also appear in the early years of the 20th century, such as the Association of the Ladies of Charity ("Associação das Damas de Caridade") (1913) and the first important hospital, Nossa Senhora de Pompéia, inaugurated in 1920. The first banks also opened their branches: Banco da Província in 1918, and Banco Nacional do Comércio in 1920. Electricity started to illuminate the city in 1913, offering greater comfort and possibilities for socialization, while boosting productive activities.

The agro-industrial fairs multiply in the rural and urban areas, expanding even to the capital of the state, and the Festa da Uva is consolidated as a commercial and tourist attraction of regional scope. The autonomous specialized professionals find a bigger market and syndicates are formed, following the growing urbanization of the city, which begins to build with greater sophistication in masonry, abandoning the stone and wood constructions that were typical of the early days, and can now erect monuments and take care of the "macadamization" of the central streets, and the embellishment of the main public places.

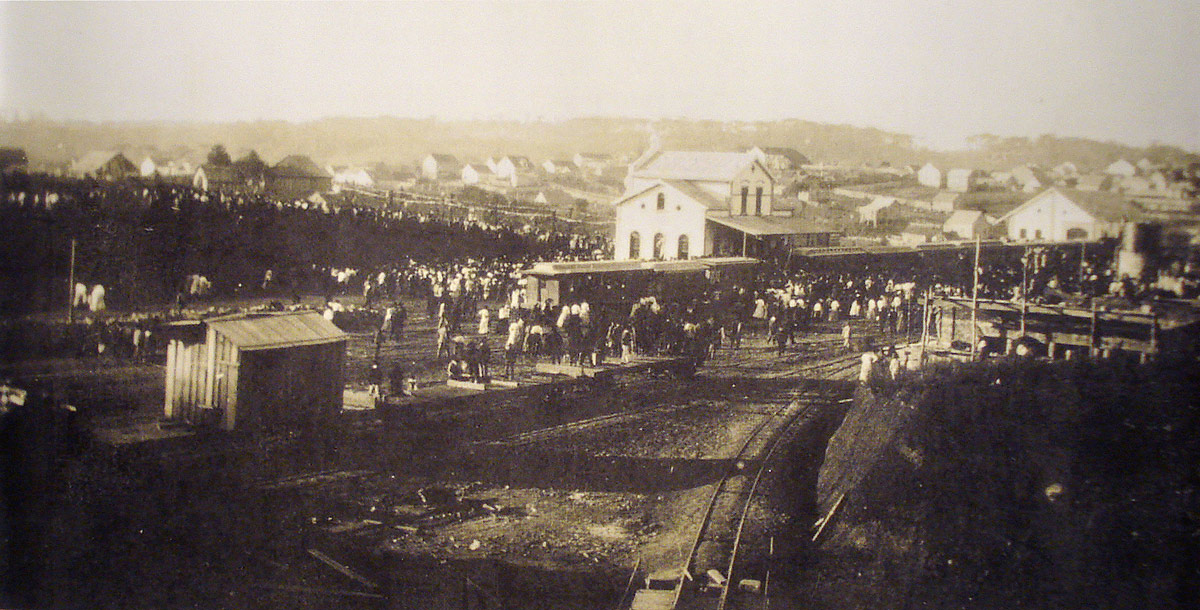
Inauguration of the Railroad on 1 June 1910, date of the elevation of the Villa of Caxias to city status. Photo from AHM.

On 1 June 1910, the "Vila de Santa Tereza de Caxias" was elevated to the status of city by Decree 1,607, simplifying its name to "Caxias". The same day, the first train arrived there. Statistics from 1910 reveal that 235 industries and 186 commercial houses were already operating in the city. Other ethnic groups, such as the Portuguese, Poles, Africans, Germans, and Jews, were attracted there and contributed to the overall development. Farming was no longer the major base of the economy, although it still supported both commerce and industry. In the first half of the 20th century, trade-oriented grape growing and processing activities would establish themselves as the main local economic interest.

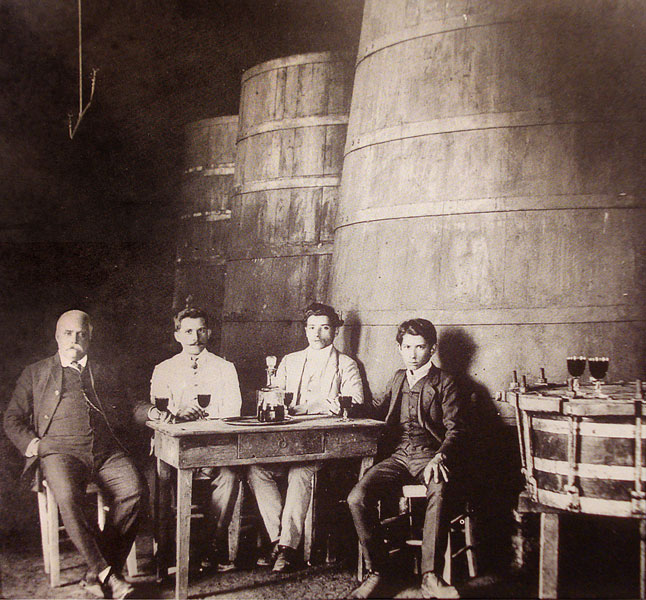
Antonio Pieruccini's Cantina, 1910. AHM photo.

However, in 1911, a serious crisis broke out in the wine sector, caused by over harvesting and the adulteration of wine in the distribution centers of Rio de Janeiro and São Paulo, with the consequent discrediting of the product, forcing the federal government to hire the Italian Stefano Paternó to organize the first cooperatives of producers in the south. The initiative had the immediate support of the state government, which exempted them from various taxes, and it was Paternó who also managed to reorganize the Commercial Association, which at the time was deactivated due to various problems, and led it to a phase of greater understanding with the public authorities. Notwithstanding his efforts, the cooperatives mostly failed and the crisis would last with ups and downs until the 1930s.

The great international crises of the first half of the century did not produce excessively negative effects on the city, on the contrary, The First World War was not mentioned in the books of the Commercial Association until 1919. The number of business categories at the time rose to more than 40, with a capital of almost 5 thousand contos de réis, and the difficulty in international trade imposed by the conflict forced the local industry to find alternative solutions to the lack of certain imported goods, highlighting the performance of Metalúrgica Abramo Eberle, which was later one of the forces for the direction of the local economy for the metal-mechanic sector (today metal industry is the main source of income of the city). There was also the introduction of new machinery and modern techniques in the field of viticulture.

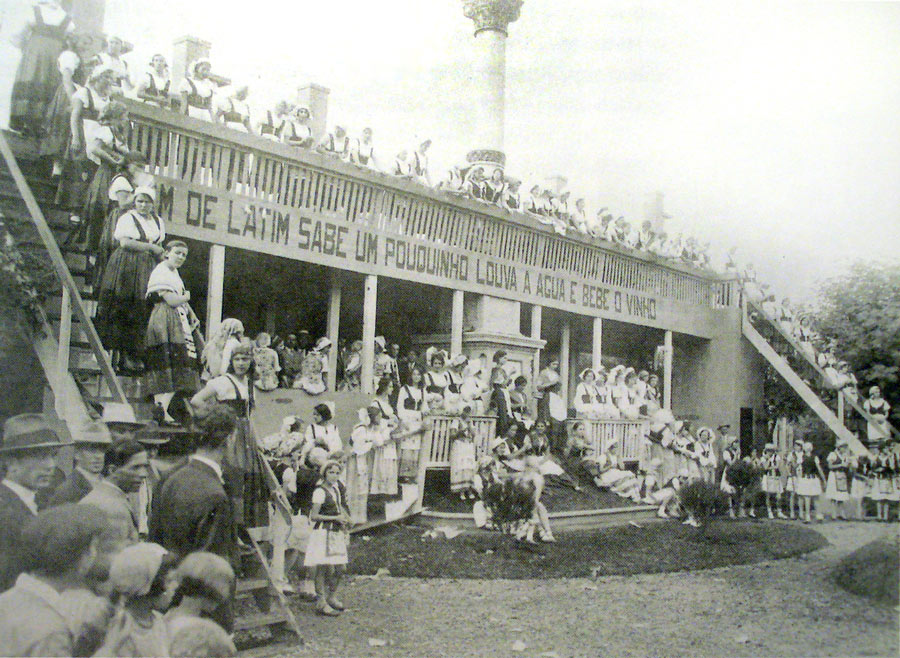
Pavilions of the 1932 Festa da Uva, at the Dante Alighieri Square. Photo from AHM.

In the same way, the Great Depression of 1929 stimulated internal industrialization to supply a growing market that until then depended on imports. Even though an impact was felt in the region due to the scarcity of circulating capital, limiting credit and preventing the fulfillment of commitments, the federal government's incentive to primary activities resulted, at the first moment, in the growth of local commerce and industry, still strongly based on the processing of natural products. However, this growth amid a general crisis soon triggered a serious shortage of electricity and transportation, to the point of driving away companies and threatening the operation of one of the largest industries in Caxias do Sul at the time, Abramo Eberle. Once again, the trade association intervened and joined the efforts of the business class and the government, solving the problem and demonstrating the great union of society around common goals.

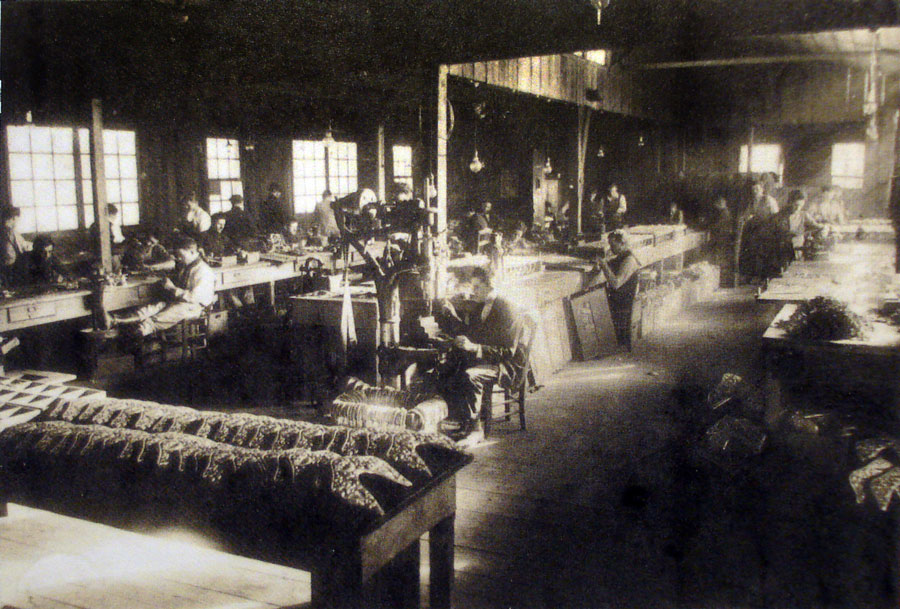
Interior of Metalúrgica Abramo Eberle. Photo from AHM.

Despite the Vargas government's support for primary activities, its new labor and social security legislation forced a restructuring of social labor relations. Thus, the work calendar and the Trade and Industrialists Union were reorganized, and a Mixed Commission for Conciliation of the Business and Working Classes was created, aiming at an adjustment to the new legislation. New determinations by the municipal administration in the area of public health at the end of the 1930s also had the effect of improving working conditions in the city's commercial and industrial establishments, and the issues of water and light supply, as well as sewage and garbage disposal, began to receive concentrated attention from the public authorities.

During World War II, again the problems turn into benefits, and growth in industrial activity is observed. Some local companies were declared by the government to be "of military interest", and confiscated to produce at full capacity for the army. Their workers were treated as soldiers and were prevented from leaving the workplace on the pain of being considered deserters. This pressure eventually spurred the emergence of a more dynamic economy, and the traditional economic pattern began to be abandoned.

In summary, in the first half of the 20th century, the city grew a lot and diversified its economic spectrum, driven as much by the success of viticulture as by the progressive urbanization and by the failure of the colonial system of small family property. The successive fragmentation of the rural properties among the multiple heirs made them incapable of providing for the sustenance of the families, generally, large ones. This caused a rural flight and transformed a reasonable part of the former farmers into workers in the industries and commerce that expanded in the urban area, becoming also common the figure of the peasant that worked part of the time as an urban worker to complement his income. The laborer's activity was considered light for those who were used to the exhausting work on the land. In total, the worker often accumulated 16 hours of daily work. Child labor was also common in the city, just as it was in the countryside.

Despite the difficulties of the transition from one economic model to another, economic crises, political and social problems, the overall result was expressively positive, as some indicators show. The number of public schools grew steadily: in 1901 there were 20 in rural areas and 4 in urban areas; in 1914 two technical schools were created; in 1922 there were 79 rural schools, 14 state schools and 20 run by the municipality, and between 1946 and 1948 23 supplementary courses and itinerant rural libraries were founded. The municipal budget for education moved from 0.93 percent in 1902 to 12.81 percent in 1949, and the urban population went from 2,500 in 1900 to 36,742 people in 1950. Much of this early economic progress was due to the formation of a culture characteristic of the region, which was founded on ethnic ties, common goals, and a network of mutual trust and cooperation among participants, the so-called social capital, which is a productive force in itself, "making possible the realization of certain goals that would be unattainable if it did not exist." The first half of the century ends in the city with the appearance of a radio station, Rádio Caxias, which from 1946 also gave its contribution to the economy by serving as an efficient advertising vehicle for companies, when until then the dissemination of products depended on newspapers, word of mouth and loudspeakers.

=== Cultural diversification ===
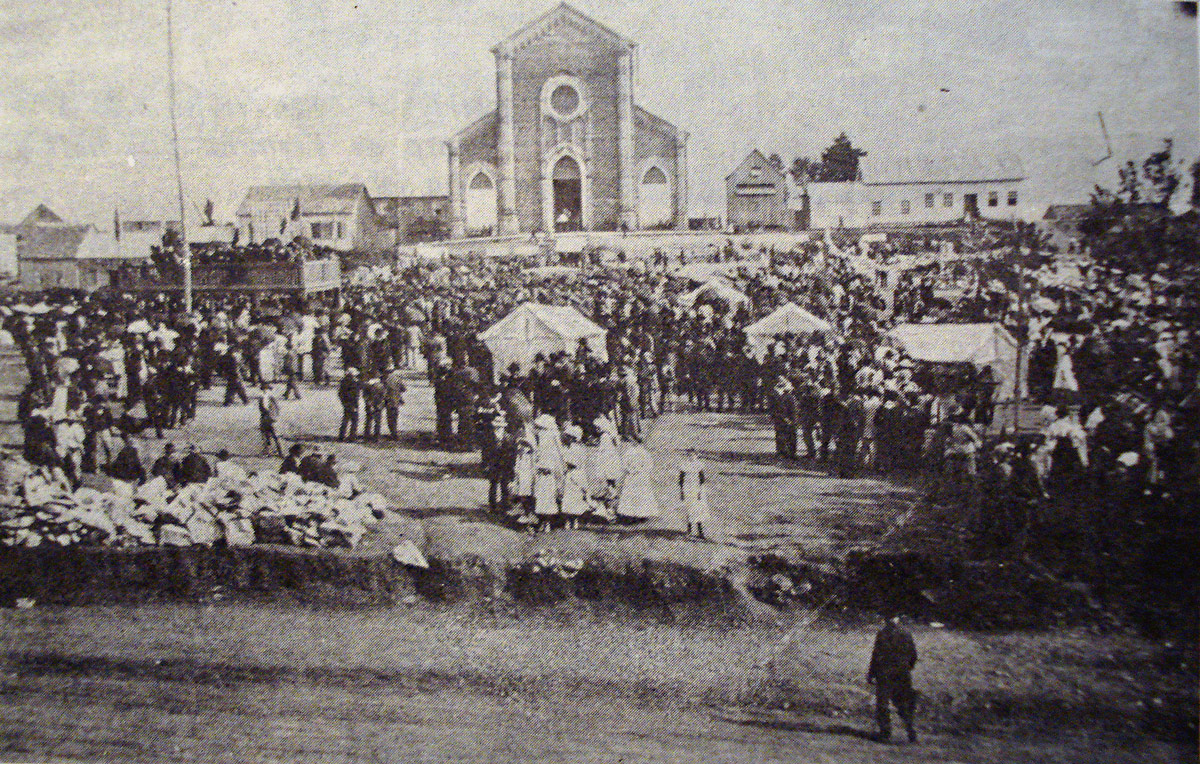
Kermesse at the feast of Saint Teresa, in 1910

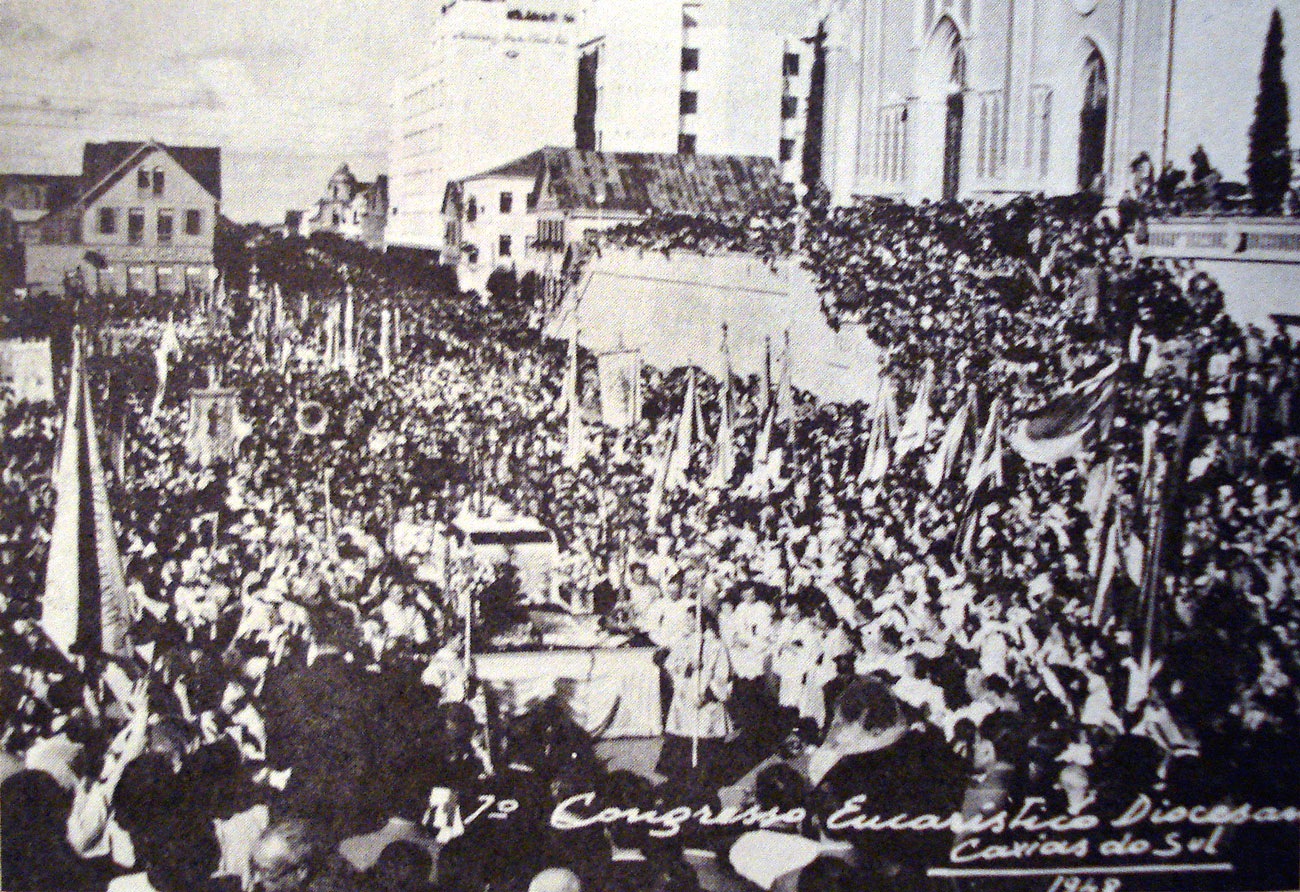
Diocesan Eucharistic Congress in 1948

The religious festivities continued to play a relevant role in the social congregation, and, as the city grew richer, they could now increase their relevance, counting on the diligent collaboration of several devotional societies, such as the Apostleship of Prayer and the Catholic Women's Youth, which organized the activities, collected donations, and prepared the ornaments. The most celebrated dates were the main church festivities, such as Christmas, Easter, and the day of the cathedral's patron saint, St. Teresa of Avila. These celebrations, which included masses, processions, and litanies in the churches, were accompanied by kermesses with various popular attractions: bingo games, mora games, greasy pole, target practice, band performances, and others. Initially held outdoors, later in winter they began to take place in sheds or on the first floor of the Bishopric. From 1947 on, they were organized around the Catholica Domus, the Episcopal secretariat, when the novelty was the purchase by the Bishopric of a jazz instrumental ensemble for the performances of the group "As Garotas do Jazz", which was a great success.

A notable moment was the holding of the Diocesan Eucharistic Congress in 1948, which mobilized virtually the entire city and attracted crowds from outside when a monumental altar was built in Dante Square, and a huge procession of cars accompanied the transfer of the image of Our Lady of Caravaggio from her shrine in Farroupilha to the Cathedral, where it remained for a few weeks. Finally, the celebration of sacraments such as First Communion, Confirmation, and Marriage, true rites of passage, continued to be surrounded with the maximum luxury that families were able to offer in the making of the costumes, the adornment of the church and the parties that followed. Such dates constituted both a religious and social event.

Parallel to the continuity of the religious factor as the unifying link of society, the economic growth of Caxias do Sul and the end of the immigrants' settlement phase enabled the formation of an elite, which was more educated and could devote itself more to leisure and culture in less folkloric and more cosmopolitan patterns, while the general population also benefited from these advances. Under the stimulus of the upper classes, the first cafés and recreational clubs were created, such as the Clube Juvenil (1905) and the Recreio da Juventude (1912), which offered a cultural program to their members, including poetry and music recitals, thematic and sports contests, and holding the first gala balls. Women's groups for social, cultural, and charitable activity such as As Falenas and the Éden Juventudista, linked respectively to the Youth Club and the Youth Recreation, contributed to strengthening women's participation in community life.

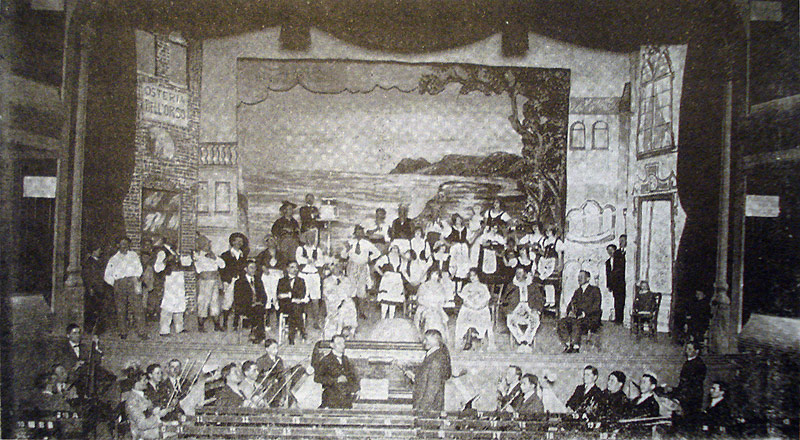
Scene from the operetta Don Pasticcio at the Cine Theatro Apollo, 1922. Photo from AHM.

Amateur sports clubs also appear, such as Esporte Clube Ideal (1910), the first in the city, Esporte Clube Juventude (1913), and Grêmio Esportivo Flamengo (1935). In 1917, the first public library was created by the Intendancy, and the first theaters and movie theaters appeared, such as the Cinema Juvenil (before 1910), the Cine Theatro Apollo (1921), and the Cinema Central (1927–28), which brought the most up-to-date film production of the time, gave space to itinerant theater companies and local amateurs, and even to operatic groups. Also notable was the creation in 1937 of the Tobias Barreto de Menezes Cultural Center, founded by Percy Vargas de Abreu e Lima, an important intellectual personality of the city. The Center offered free evening courses in Humanities and Sciences open to the entire population, developed a series of other cultural activities, and was a focus of political discussion due to the founder's socialist ideas. The city's current Casa da Cultura bears his name. Another important cultural association was the Centro Literário José de Alencar, created by the Círculo Operário Caxiense in 1939, holding conferences, reading sessions, and having a library.

The social customs and the urban landscape were recorded at the beginning of the century by the important photographers Domingos and Reno Mancuso, Giacomo and Ulysses Geremia, and Julio Calegari, who were in great demand at the time and left extensive work. This constitutes an important work of visual documentation of the spirit of the time. Finally, in the field of plastic arts, notable names continuing the artisan tradition of sacred art, founded by the first stonemasons at the turn of the 19th to the 20th century, are Estacio Zambelli and Michelangelo Zambelli, both sons of the pioneer Tarquinio Zambelli. They left, especially Michelangelo, a vast work of statuary scattered in temples throughout the region, with artworks in the Cathedral, the Municipal Museum, and private collections. Michelangelo was recently distinguished with the creation, in 2004, by the City Hall in partnership with the Festa da Uva, of the Zambelli Atelier Memorial, intended to preserve his memory and work.

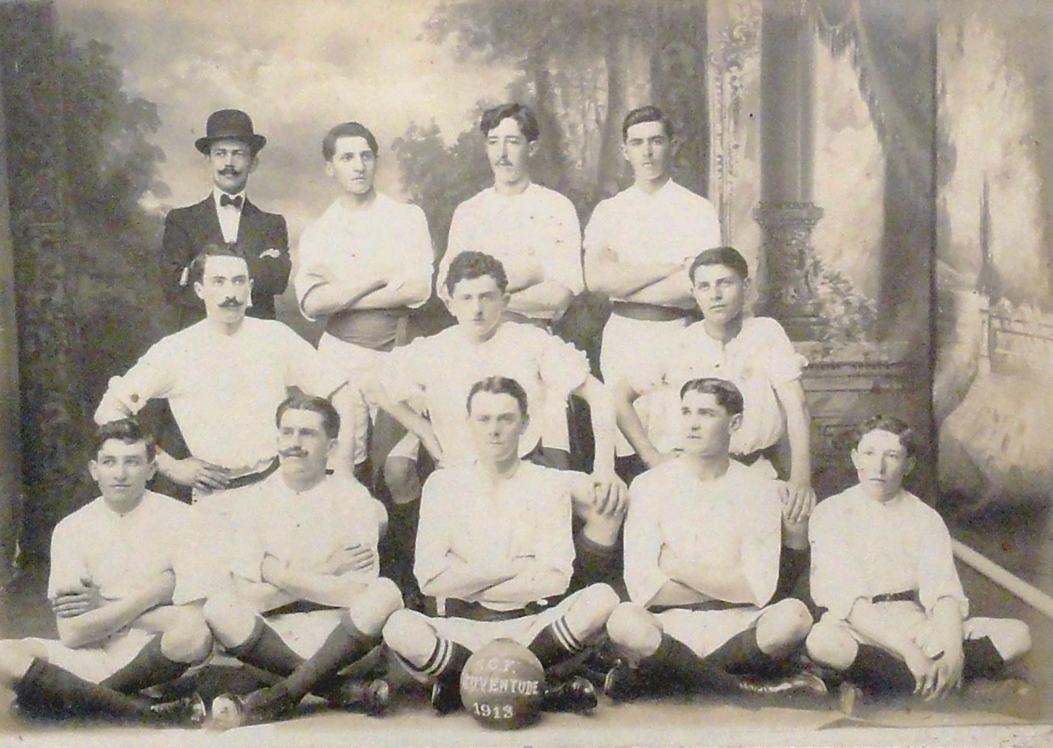
First team of Esporte Clube Juventude, 1913

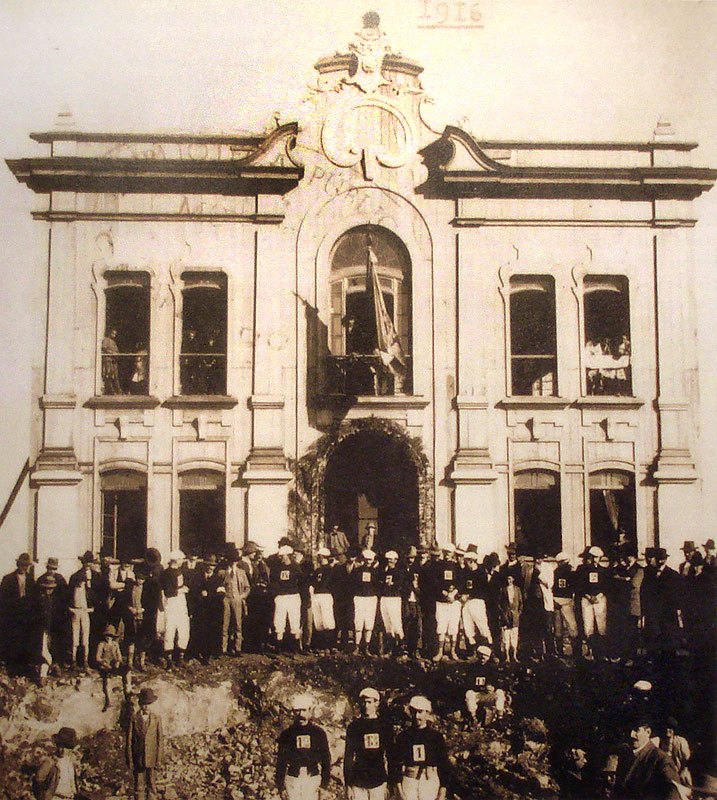
First headquarters of the Youth Club, 1916. Photo from AHM

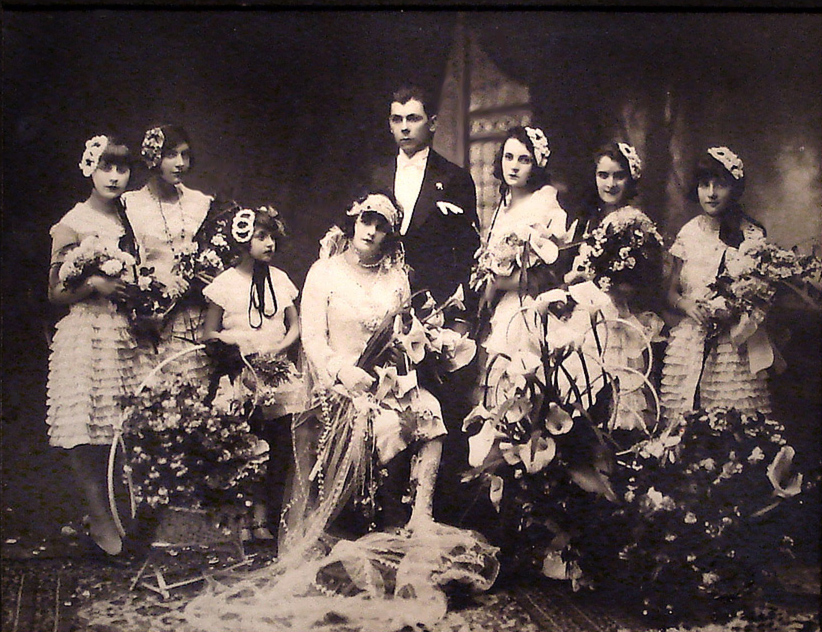
Bridal photograph, by Julio Calegari, 1921

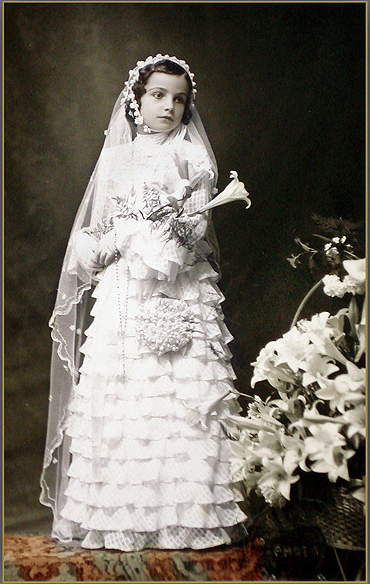
First Communion Photo, 1930s

=== Politics and public administration ===
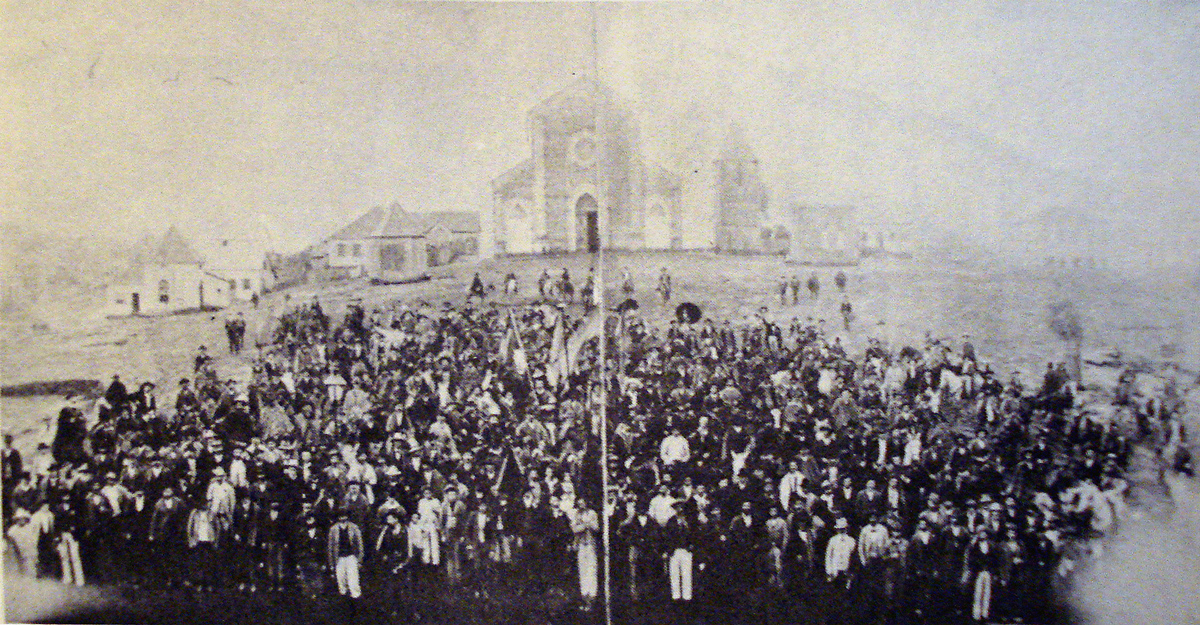
Concentration of voters at the Dante Alighieri Square in 1902.

The political and revolutionary movements of the first half of the 20th century also had a local impact. The elections for State President in 1922 were marred by fraud and intimidation. The electoral titles of those opposed to the Castilhista line were withheld, generating mass public protests which, thanks to the intervention of priest João Meneguzzi, did not end in tragedy. The manipulated ascension of Borges de Medeiros to state power triggered the 1923 Revolution, culminating in a period of a political and economic crisis that had been brewing for some time, with negative consequences for Caxias do Sul's commerce and industry. The city's trade associations then tried to minimize the problems by pleading with the federal government.

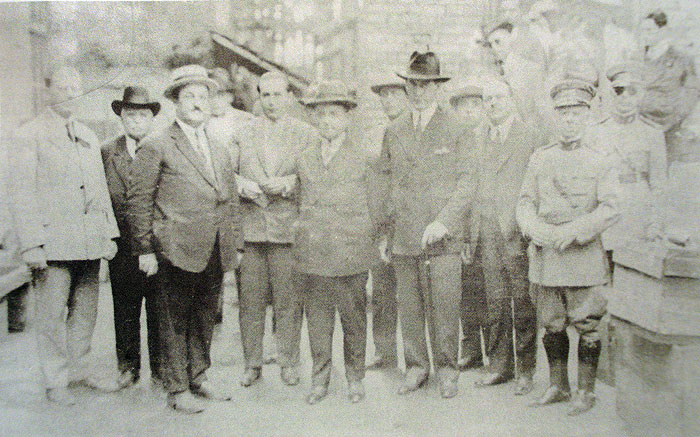
Visit by Getúlio Vargas in 1928. Photo from AHM.

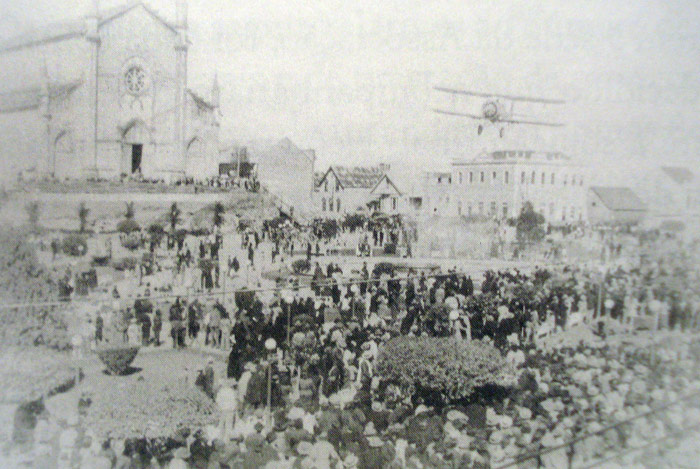
Pro-New State demonstrations in the Dante Alighieri Square, 1937–38. Photo from AHM.

Despite the difficulties, in 1925, the fiftieth anniversary of Italian immigration to Brazil was celebrated, in a period that proved to be extremely propitious to start a public consecration of the successes already achieved and consolidated, aiming first to integrate the colonial elites in the state historical panorama, until then dominated by the pastoralist-landowning representations. It tried to take advantage of the colonies' support of Borges de Medeiros' politics, who created an apology about the achievements of small landowners and white immigrants, but in practice tried to prevent them from ascending to the higher public administration. This dubious political discourse was echoed by intellectuals such as Alfredo Varela and Moysés Vellinho, who were concerned about the competition of the Italian element, considered less noble, with the tradition of the Portuguese family.

At the same time, in Fascist Italy, an interest arose in reconstructing the history of the emigrants by interpreting it as a powerful civilizing contribution of the Latin race to the New World and urging Italians in Brazil to defend their ethnic origin. Benito Mussolini, in the prologue to the commemorative album Cinquantenario della Colonizzazione Italiana nello Stato del Rio Grande del Sud, declared, "In the noble pride that raises your souls, as you stop to contemplate the result of long and tenacious toil, I glimpse the sign of the noblest strain that has imprinted an immortal trace in the history of the Peoples."

The same spirit animated politicians like Celeste Gobbato to, in the same album, say that the government could not have chosen better human material for its colonizing enterprise, exalting the supposedly innate qualities of the Italians. Such exacerbated patriotism and racist positioning, which was not exempt from foreign manipulation, had its consequences. Getúlio Vargas, from 1930 on, adopted a line of nationalist development, starting to repress state autonomy and regional singularities, the so-called "social cysts" that had been "imprudently" formed in various regions of Brazil, including the south. At this moment, the overly optimistic and confident self-image built by the Italians began to be put down, and instead of collaborators in the Brazilian growth and settlement process, the immigrants began to be seen as potential enemies of the homeland. The process came to a culmination with Brazil's entry into World War II on the side of the Allies against the Axis countries, causing a deep rupture of the ties between Italy and Brazil, with heavy consequences for the immigration region.

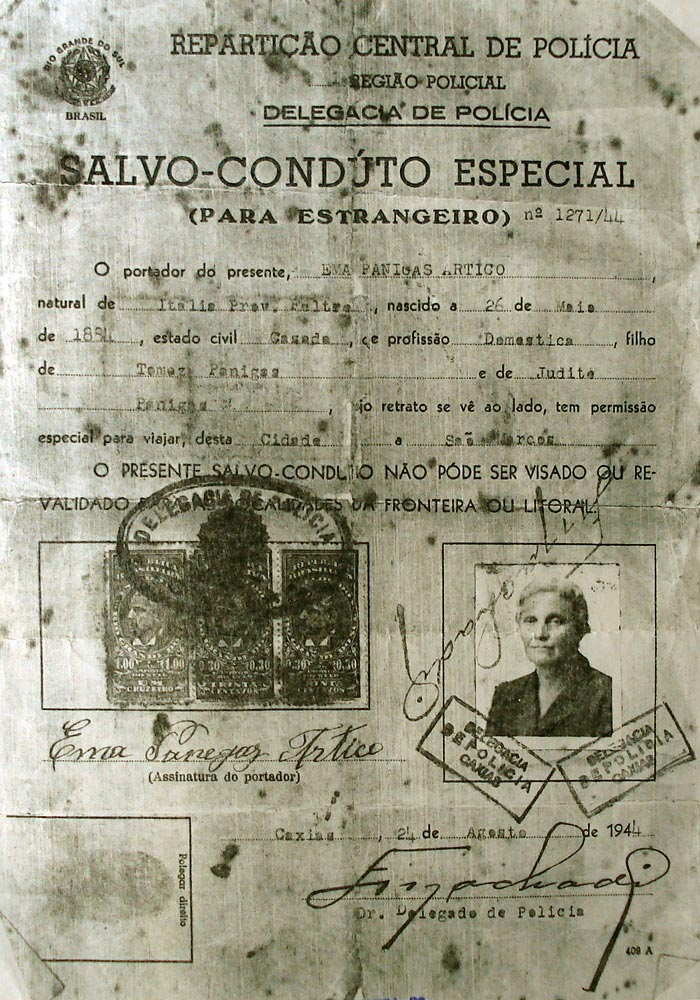
Safe conduct issued in favor of Ema Panigaz Artico for travelling from Caxias do Sul to São Marcos, 1944.

Meanwhile, the municipal administration was also changing. The development of the entire region led some districts in Caxias to claim autonomy, and so in 1924 Nova Trento, and 1934 Nova Vicenza became independent. At the seat of the city, the system of Intendants assisted by the Municipal Council functioned until 1930, when the new Brazilian revolutionary government established the position of mayor. The legislature was closed and in its place was installed an Advisory Council with three members, remaining in activity until 1935, when the new City Council was structured, adapting to what was foreseen in the 1934 Constitution. This model remained in force until 1937 when a law reform dissolved the legislatures again. They would only meet again in 1947, following the new Constitution of 1946. A little earlier, on 29 December 1944, the municipal administration, through Decree No. 720, had changed the territorial division of the city by creating new neighborhoods, and also its name, until then simply Caxias, to Caxias do Sul. Urban growth also required changes in legislation regarding urban planning, public health, occupation of space by private individuals, and other matters.

In the period of World War II, the city was troubled by political differences, by the xenophobic atmosphere created by the nationalist policy of the Vargas Era and by the armed conflict with Italy. Between 1941 and 1944, there were popular anti-Italian demonstrations organized by the National Defense League, which sought to suppress the identifying signs of ethnicity, creating an atmosphere of terror. Groups of demonstrators, among other acts of aggression, removed the bronze plaque from the immigration memorial obelisk erected in the district of Nova Milano, and, in the urban center, the plaques that indicated Italy Avenue and Dante Alighieri Square, demanding – and obtaining – the replacement of their names. The Italians were forbidden to speak their dialect, and a wall of silence formed around them, since many, especially the older ones, could still barely express themselves in Portuguese. Their movement became dependent on obtaining safe-conducts, severely hindering their interaction at all levels with Brazilians. Such repression led to an effort of self-censorship on the part of the Italians themselves and their descendants, discouraging the cultivation of memory even in the bosom of the home and interrupting until 1950 the celebration of the Festa da Uva. The same happened to those who, in smaller numbers, descended from Germans and spoke German.

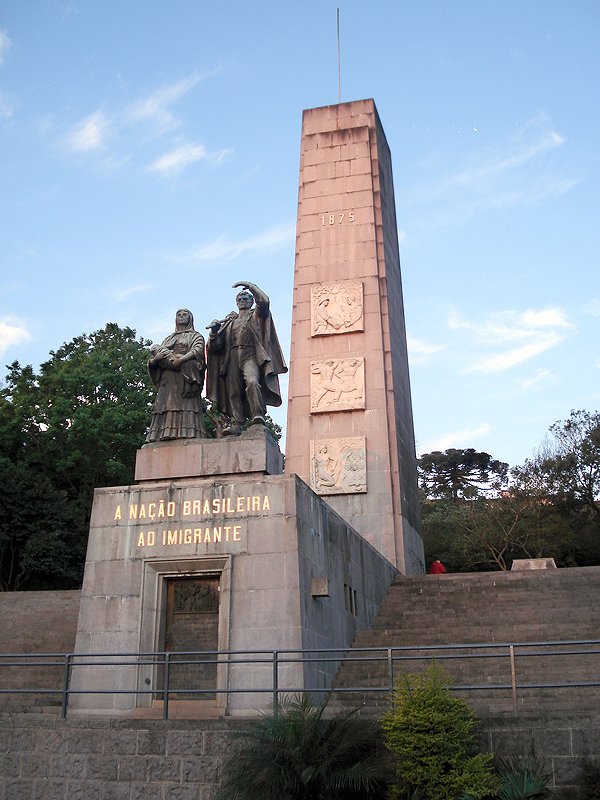
The National Monument to the Immigrant, one of the symbols of Caxias do Sul.

The Church continued to be actively involved in politics in this period. On 16 September 1945, there was a dangerous confrontation at a rally against communism held in front of the Cathedral, which attracted many caravans from the countryside, and Bishop José Barea was threatened with death by the communists if he attended. A new confrontation took place a month later, on the occasion of a public novena, when Catholic and communist groups attacked each other, shouting slogans and insulting each other. The firemen intervened by throwing water on the crowd, and priests and others involved were arrested. Finally, the Catholics triumphed, the priests were released, and the conflict ended without further consequences, amidst a great procession, where the National Anthem was sung with great enthusiasm. Moreover, a series of initiatives of the Church were openly supported by the Public Power and special commissions created by the City Hall regularly counted with the participation of religious

The passage from the first to the second half of the century is marked by an event of great symbolic value: the construction of the Monument to the Immigrant, later transformed into a national monument. Its construction was proposed in 1949, being inaugurated in 1954, in line with the policy of reconciliation with Italy undertaken by Getúlio after the end of the War, and revaluing the foreign worker after the disdain expressed a few years earlier, when all ethnic schools were compulsorily nationalized and the use of dialects was repressed. However, from part of the elite descending from Italians, the tone of the discourse was no longer identical to that of the times influenced by fascism. The socioeconomic profile of Caxias had been profoundly transformed, the elite was beginning to take as a model the Portuguese-Brazilian elite, to which it intended to match in terms of influence and prestige, and at the same time, however, the dignity of the Italians was beginning to be recovered, initiating a period of reconstruction of the collective image and identity in which the Italian was again portrayed as a civilizing hero.

=== Festa da Uva ===
From 1931 on, this festivity was the biggest profane event in the city, loaded with strong symbolism. The feast originated from the various festivities commemorating the grape harvests and the agro-industrial fairs that the settlers held in small groups in their ravines. In 1931, these scattered festivities were brought together in a large municipal celebration, which received the name that lasts until today. Besides the direct trade of the products displayed in the big showcase that was the party (in the contact between the producers and other interested parties), there was the exchange of experiences and technical information to improve the conditions of cultivation and processing of the grape. As noted by an observer of the press, "numerous were the visitors who with a pencil in hand in front of the varieties (of grapes) that were of interest took note of their characters and their names, to introduce them in their plantations, to improve their vineyard."

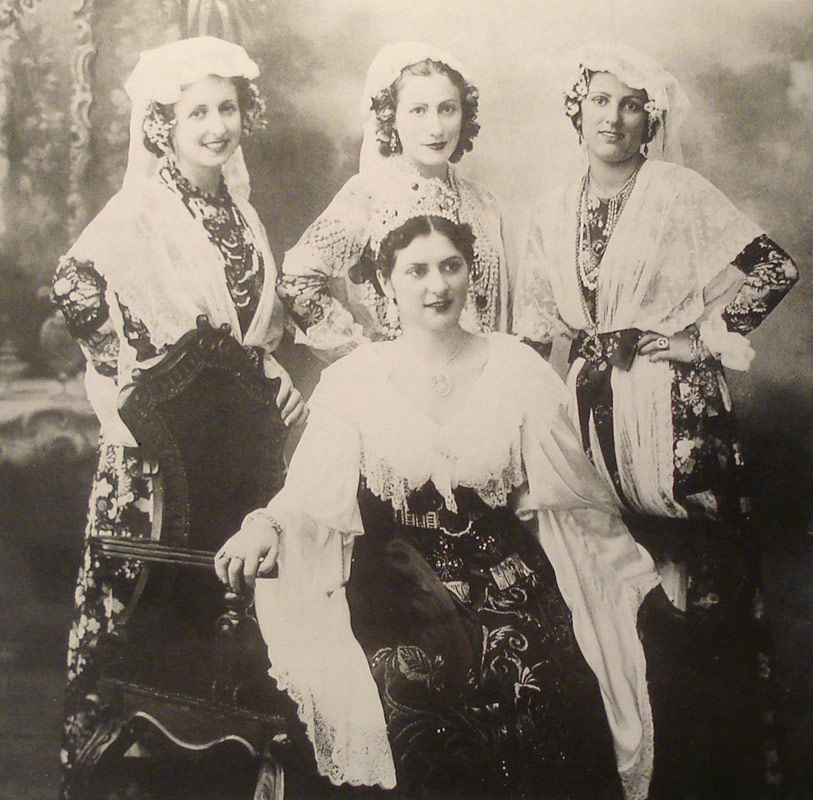
Júlio Calegari: Queen and princesses of the 1934 Festa da Uva. Photo from AHM.

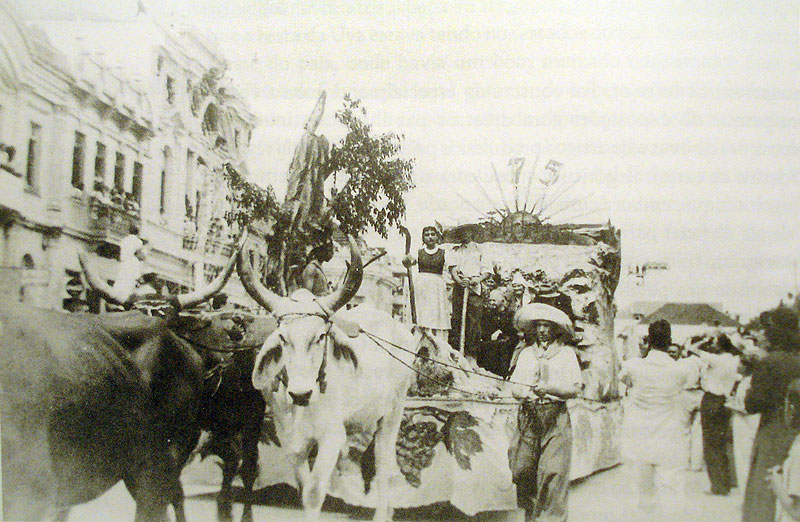
Parade of floats in 1950. AHM photo.

The festival was a complete success, gathering more than fifty exhibitors that presented more than one hundred species of grapes and dozens of types of wines, which served to guide its realization in a new and broader format, resulting in the 1932 edition being called by the Revista do Globo as "the most memorable event, until today, in this part of the state." More than a commercial and technical success, the party since then has been coated with political, rhetorical and symbolic elements that reflected the achievements made by immigrants, reiterated the Italian element, its civilizing role, its hard work, pioneering spirit, ingenuity and tenacity, and its collaboration in building the Brazilian nation, in accordance with Positivism and Fascism, that tinted the political ideology of the time. Among its most prominent signatures was the "Great Triumphal Grape Parade", the model for the float parades that are still held today. Besides the exhibition of the products of the land and the parade, there were also contests for the ornamentation of buildings and residences, flower battles, choral contests, banquets, private balls and open-air dances. As Cleodes Ribeiro states:

If the liturgy of the Festa da Uva ritual served to proclaim the identity of the celebrants, display the result of the work developed over more than half a century and claim the status of Brazilians, its defining characteristics were made explicit by the symbolic vocabulary employed in the ritual. The speeches, the display and distribution of grapes, the triumphal procession, the tendeiras in their typical costumes, the songs, the banquets, the congress and the flags adorning the streets, all reflected the efforts of the offerers of the feast in the process of self-representation.

As for the symbolic figure of the queen of the festivity, the eloquent greeting addressed to her at the opening of the 1933 event, recorded in the report of that edition, exemplifies the image Italians intended to build of themselves and of the role they imagined they would play on the national scene: "I salute you, Queen of the Festa da Uva and Lady of the domains without end of our sympathy and the heart of Caxias, the heart that moves and acts by the valorous blood of a race of heroes, still unsung, that gives Rio Grande the propulsive sap to the realization of what it will be one day, within Brazil, and under the sky of free America."

Between 1938 and 1950, the festival was not held, due to the nationalist policy of Getúlio Vargas, but in the 1950 edition, coinciding with the celebration of 75 years of immigration and the beginning of the reconciliation phase, the festival already had the participation of ten municipalities and exhibited industrial products, resulting from the economic growth of the city and the greater variety in its production profile. The immigrants started to be called "pioneers", indicating a reorientation in the identity to be built, with progressive implications that opened for the non-Italians, already considered actors in the whole process.

== From 1950 to 2000 ==
Just as the first half of the twentieth century represented an opening and greater integration of the city to the state and national context, the second half appears as a phase of opening to the world, with the change in its productive, political and cultural profile, the beginning of its presence in the foreign market, and the consolidation of its position as one of the largest economies in Brazil. In general terms, the city grows rapidly in this interval, going from a population of 54,000 in 1950 to 180,000 in 1975 and about 360,000 people in 2000 bringing with it all the social, cultural, economic and environmental problems typical of Brazilian cities with a high rate of expansion. In 1994, through State Complementary Law 10 335/94, the Urban Agglomeration of the Northeast of Rio Grande do Sul was created, since the area is characterized as the embryo of a future metropolitan region.

=== The new economy of Caxias ===
In 1951, Getúlio Vargas returned to power after the administration of Gaspar Dutra, who had oriented Brazilian development in the direction of opening to international capital. His return introduced new political factors that conflicted with the economic context created by his predecessor, generating problems in the areas of communication, energy, exports, credit, and taxation. With the presidency of Juscelino Kubitschek, a developmentalism program was initiated in an attempt to modernize the country and overcome its backwardness, but the economic failure of João Goulart's government would lead to a coup that established the Military Dictatorship in Brazil, making the first decades of this period tumultuous.

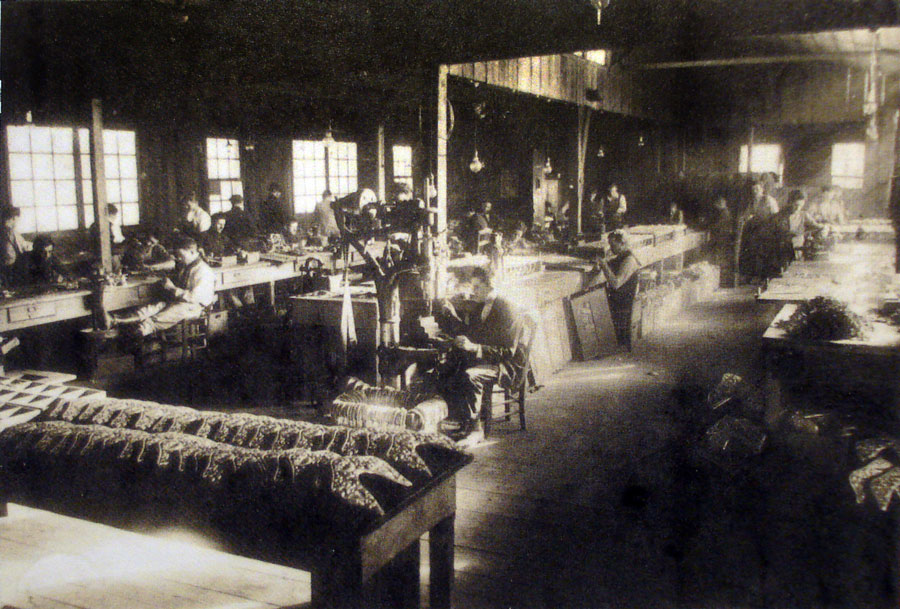
Abramo Eberle Metallurgical Plant in the 1950s

In the context of the city of Caxias, the rural family economy system starts to become problematic with the multiplication of families and the consequent progressive fragmentation of the properties, originating the rural exodus phenomenon. This surplus of people seeks employment in the urban industry and, given the insufficient wages, has difficulties attending to basic needs such as housing and health, starting a process of slumming in the suburbs. Women start to have a more significant participation in the industry as workers, although at first still discriminated and with lower wages. The more or less tranquil traditional relations between employers and employees begin to become complex and delicate with the increasing occurrence of strikes, where those of the early 1960s shake the business environment and force a reformulation of postures in this field, and a large supply of cheap and unskilled labor causes a greater turnover in jobs.

An attempt was made to overcome these problems by restructuring the class organizations. Thus, the Trade Association decided to receive a branch of the Center of Manufacturing Industry of Porto Alegre, in the wake of the great expansion of the sector in the city, and soon in 1954, the Center of Manufacturing Industry of Caxias do Sul was installed, which separated the commerce from the industry, causing a split among the business leaderships, which, until then, were all congregated in the Trade Association. However, the Center was important in this stage when it worked to solve the challenges present, besides fostering the development of the general productive infrastructure. This is when large local companies established themselves in the Brazilian market, such as Metalúrgica Abramo Eberle, and others that would later become equally important, such as Marcopolo and Randon.

In 1973, industry and commerce, under the mentorship of Paulo Bellini and Edemir Zatti respectively, got together again to create the Chamber of Industry and Commerce. The centennial celebrations of immigration in 1975 found the city as the second largest metropolis in the state and one of the ten fastest growing in the entire country, which gave rise to more problems in terms of basic infrastructure of health, environment, urban planning, education, housing, transportation, and employment. The economic forces led by the Chamber of Industry and Commerce, together with the public administration, understood that it would be necessary to prioritize the problems to better solve them, and the idea of creating an Industrial District was born, as a priority, to allow a better functioning of the industries and free the urban nucleus for a more rational and orderly growth. The signing of an agreement with the state government in 1979 created the Greater Caxias region and defined the area of coverage of the metal-mechanic pole that was being structured, which meant a decisive change in the economic profile of the city, which was moving from a traditional economy to a dynamic economy.

The end of the Military Regime in the 1980s, alongside the Economic Stabilization Plan of 1986 ("Plano Cruzado"), forced businessmen to double their efforts to adapt to the new hyperinflationary national reality, with the emergence of a concern with competitiveness and productivity, and an interest in the qualification of human resources by the improvement of production technologies (including the first robotic automations), the insertion in the foreign market, the constitution of small companies, and the inclusion of the services sector in the top of the economic chain. This, in 1992 led the Chamber of Industry and Commerce to rename itself to the Chamber of Industry, Commerce and Services of Caxias do Sul.

The 1990s were marked by growing computerization, the expansion of infrastructure, concern for the environment, and the opening of new jobs and new markets on several international fronts, facing the crises of the failure of the Plano Cruzado and the Plano Collor.

=== Education and culture ===
Brazilian education underwent, in this half century, profound changes, with the universalization of compulsory primary education, the expansion of secondary education and the incentive to the installation of private higher education schools. In the city, education was already well structured, with large schools in operation (Carmo, La Salle, São José, São Carlos, Cristóvão de Mendoza), and in the 1960s, the first higher education degrees were offered: Faculties of Economic Sciences and philosophy, of the Diocesan Mitra; Mother Justina Inês Nursing school, of the Sociedade Caritativo-Literária São José; Law School, of the Sociedade Hospitalar Nossa Senhora de Fátima, and the School of Fine arts, of the City Hall. These schools would be the basis for, on 10 February 1967, the founding of the University of Caxias do Sul (UCS), today one of the most prestigious private institutions of higher education in Brazil. It had on its teaching staff illustrious names such as Jayme Paviani and José Clemente Pozenato, both developing intense activity in the field of essay writing, art criticism and literature. The growing influx of migrants from other parts of Brazil, of various ethnicities and religions, also contributed to making the city's cultural environment more diverse and stimulating, a highlight being the Gauchesca influence in this traditionally Italian region.

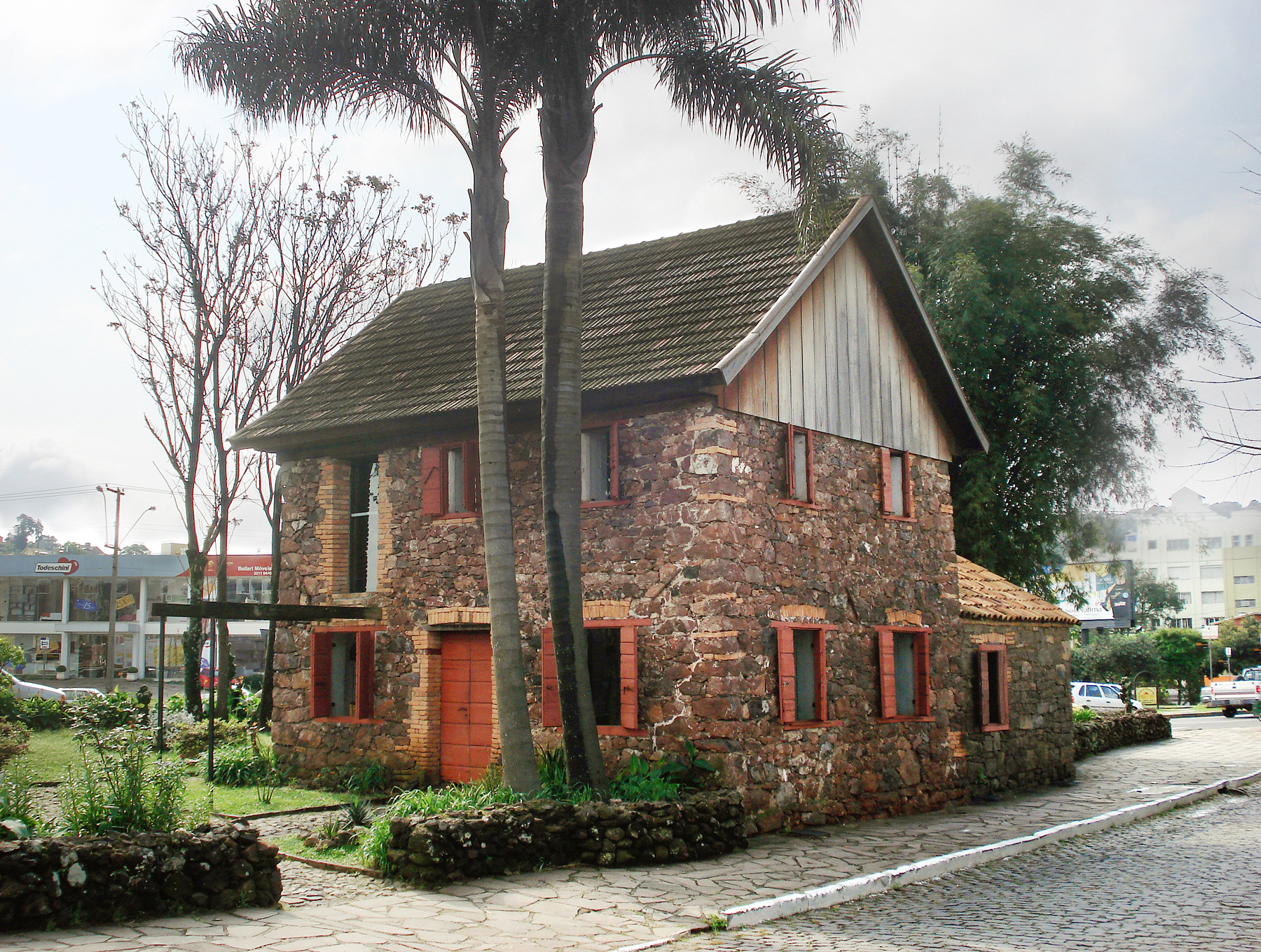
The Casa de Pedra ("Stone House"), the only remnant in the current urban area of Caxias do Sul of the first homes of the Italians. Today it is a museum.

In the mid-1960s, the Festa da Uva had already become a national event and was the largest of its kind in Latin America, being visited by over 300 thousand people, but, as a symptom of the new times, it was losing much of its traditional appeal and conforming to a markedly business profile, as would indicate its new name in the 1970s: Empresa Festa da Uva Turismo e Empreendimentos S.A.. There were many protests from sectors of the community regarding the growing dominance of machines over grapes.

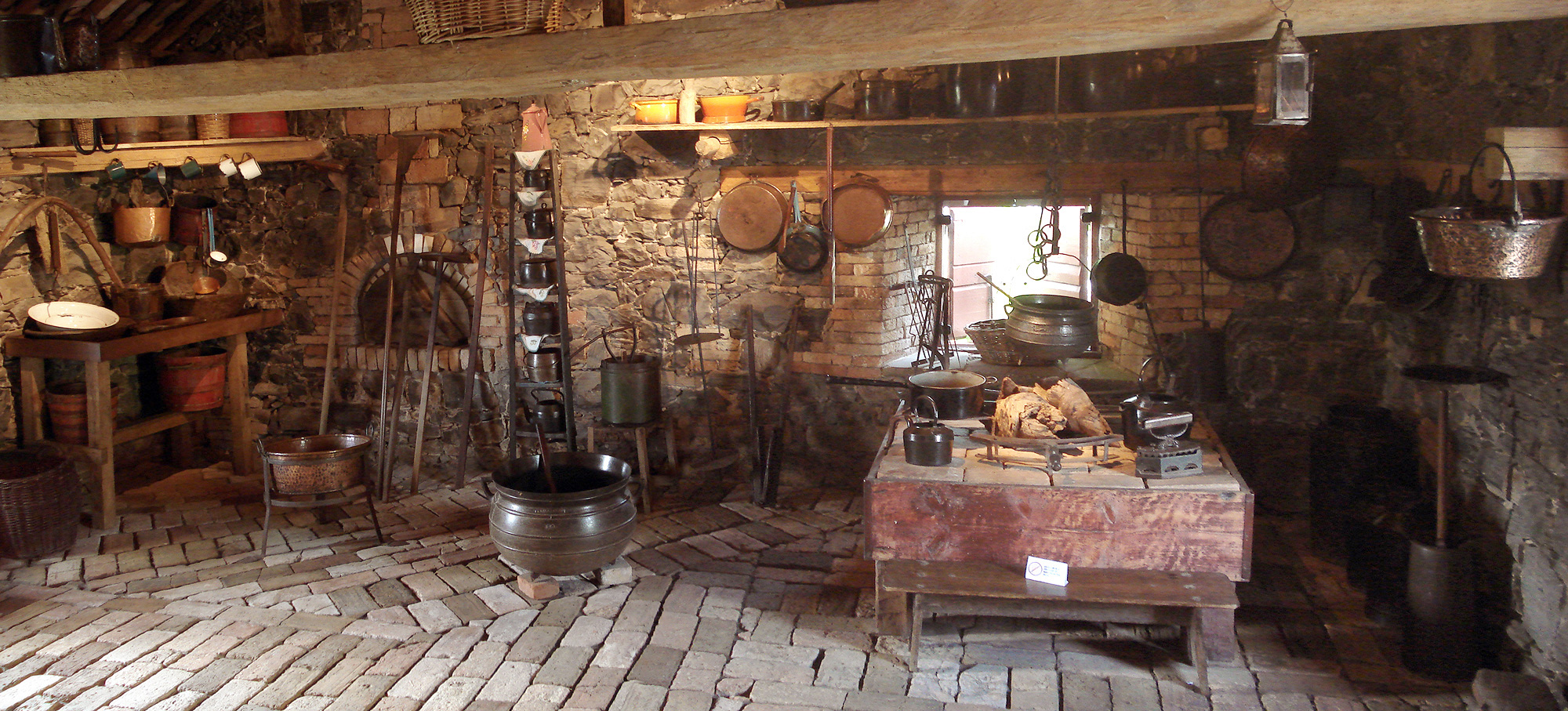
Interior of the Casa de Pedra Museum, with immigrants' household objects

The decline of religion as a social agglutinating force, the new consumer habits, the profound change in the local productive system, the standardization of Brazilian education, the disregard of the new generations for the language and customs of their grandparents, the presence of a large number of migrants of non-Italian descent, the great popularization of means of communication and entertainment such as radio, TV, cinema, and the progressive opening of the city to the world, provoked in the 1950s and 1960s a rapid decharacterization of the ethnic and traditional features of the Caxias culture This led historians in the mid-1970s like Loraine Slomp Giron, Mário Gardelin, Maria Abel Machado, Vania Herédia and many others, (following the steps of the pioneer João Spadari Adami) to develop important researches which resulted in the publication of several books for the study of local history. However, in this period, there was a real explosion of bibliography on the theme of colonization, and a revisionist trend is perceived that no longer tried to embellish the history of the settler but to present it with its contradictions and conflicts, not to diminish the image of the immigrant, but to make it more real and richer.

The same interest made the municipal government restructure and reopen the Municipal Museum in 1975 and create the Casa de Pedra Ambience Museum, two of the most important historical museums in the city today, and found in 1976 the Municipal Historical Archive. In the following decade, the City Hall's Historical Heritage Department would also be created, starting work to preserve and rescue the immaterial traditions, the artistic legacy, and the Italian architectural heritage, which were rapidly disappearing under a wave of rushed progress. The work of these institutions, which is based on a new awareness that progress can coexist with the past, together with the work of artistic groups such as the Miseri Coloni, for theater performed in dialect, are active forces that act to preserve important aspects of Italian heritage and try to revitalize and reinsert them with a critical reading in a city that becomes more cosmopolitan every day.

=== Art ===
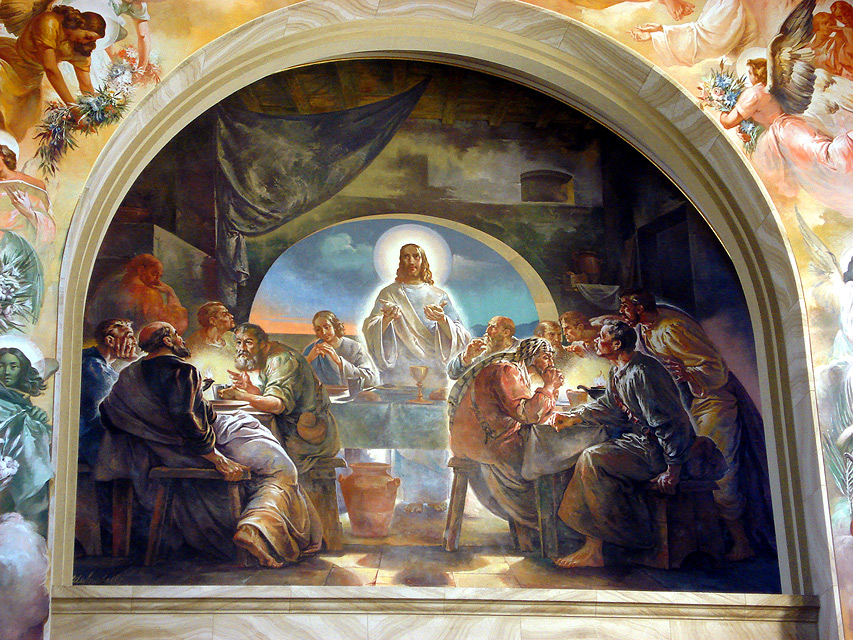
Aldo Locatelli: Last Supper, in the Church of San Pellegrino.

In the 1950s, Aldo Locatelli arrived in town to decorate the Church of São Pelegrino, creating one of the largest sets of mural paintings in the state. On the altar, he painted the "Last Supper", flanked by images of the "Sacred Heart" and the "Apparition of Our Lady of Caravaggio"; on the ceiling, he created several scenes illustrating the hymn Dies irae and the "Genesis", framing the great central composition of the "Last Judgment". On the side walls, there were canvases of the "Stations of the Cross", one of his most appreciated works. The artist would also leave his mark on the City Hall headquarters and the Chapel of the Holy Sepulchre.

However, the artists from Caxias do Sul would continue to produce mainly in empirical and amateur ways until the structuring of higher artistic education in the City Hall's School of Fine Arts, later incorporated into the University of Caxias do Sul. The university was also responsible for maintaining the active but extinct "Ateliê da Universidade de Caxias do Sul", which gave birth, in 1988, to the Núcleo de Artes Visuais de Caxias do Sul ("Art Nucleus of Caxias do Sul"), NAVI. This, together with the university's modern undergraduate course in art education, the Casa de Cultura Percy Vargas de Abreu e Lima, founded in the 1990s, created the most significant local instances of production, discussion, and diffusion of art at a high level. Among the local artists of great projection, Bruno Segalla, a renowned medalist, sculptor, and author of several monuments, and Diana Domingues, who led the research group on contemporary media linked to UCS, are worthy of note. She was one of the people responsible for taking the name of Caxias do Sul to the most important forums of artistic debate in Brazil, besides bringing to the city international names in the field of criticism, research, and production. Other outstanding figures in the city from the 1990s onward are Odete Garbin, one of the most active leaders of NAVI, Iolanda Gollo Mazzotti, Beatriz Balen Susin, Mara de Carli, and Véra Stedile Zattera, who make the female presence of central importance to the artistic presence of Caxias Sul.

== The modern regional metropolis ==
Today, Caxias do Sul is the second biggest metal-mechanic industrial center in the country and one of the largest in Latin America. More than 6,500 industries make the municipality account for about 5.83 percent of the gross domestic product of Rio Grande do Sul. It has a complete network of services and an active cultural life, having been chosen as the Brazilian Capital of Culture in 2008.

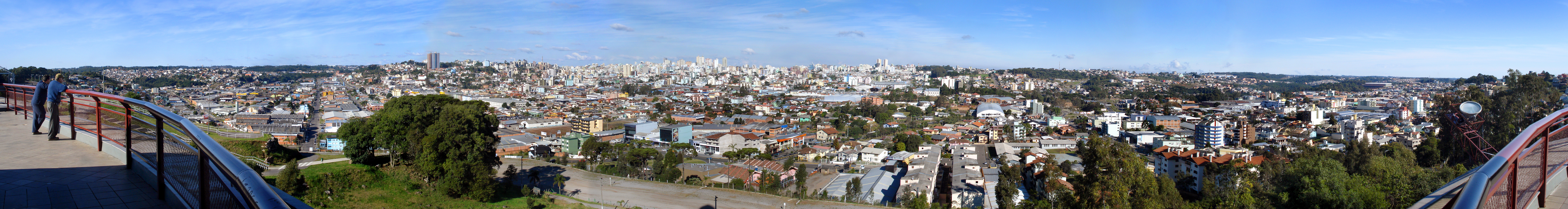
A panorama of Caxias do Sul in 2008

== See also ==
- Caxias do Sul
- History of Rio Grande do Sul
- Italian Brazilians
- Historic Center of Caxias do Sul
- Colégio La Salle Carmo
- Júlio de Castilhos Avenue
- Eberle Palace

== Bibliography ==
- Adami, João Spadari (1971). História de Caxias do Sul 1864–1970 (in Portuguese). Edições Paulinas.
- Centro de Memória da Câmara Municipal de Caxias do Sul (2012). Onzi, Geni Salete (ed.). Palavra e Poder: 120 anos do Poder Legislativo em Caxias do Sul (PDF) (in Portuguese). São Miguel.
- Machado, Maria Abel (2001). Construindo uma Cidade: História de Caxias do Sul – 1875–1950. Maneco.
- Filippon, Maria Isabel (2007). "A Casa do Imigrante Italiano: A Linguagem do Espaço de Habitar". UCS. Masters thesis.
- Brandalise, Ernesto A. (1985). Paróquia Santa Teresa – Cem Anos de Fé e História (1884–1984) (in Portuguese). EDUCS.
- Adami, João Spadari (1981). "3". História de Caxias do Sul (in Portuguese).
- Machado, Maria Abel; Herédia, Vania Beatriz Merlotti (2001). Câmara de Indústria, Comércio e Serviços de Caxias do Sul: Cem Anos de História. Maneco.
- Ribeiro, Cleodes M. P. J. (2002). Festa e Identidade: Como se fez a Festa da Uva (in Portuguese). Caxias do Sul: UCS.
