= Júlio de Castilhos (disambiguation) =

Júlio de Castilhos (1860–1903) was a Brazilian politician and journalist.

Júlio de Castilhos may also refer to:

- Júlio de Castilhos, Rio Grande do Sul, a municipality in Rio Grande do Sul, Brazil
- Júlio de Castilhos Museum, a museum in Porto Alegre, Rio Grande do Sul, Brazil
- Júlio de Castilhos Avenue (Caxias do Sul), a thoroughfare in Caxias do Sul, Rio Grande do Sul, Brazil
