= Chapel of the Holy Sepulchre =

Catholic temple in Rio Grande do Sul, Brazil

- Capela do Santo Sepulcro
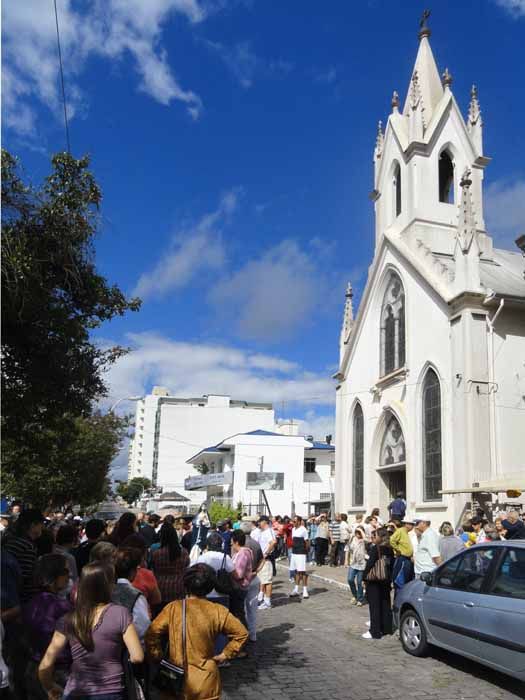
- Procession leaving the chapel, 2012
- Chapel of the Holy Sepulchre
- 29°10′03″S 51°10′05″W
- Location: Caxias do Sul, Rio Grande do Sul; Brazil

Architecture
- Architectural type: neo-Gothic
- Completed: 1937

The Chapel of the Holy Sepulchre (Portuguese: Capela do Santo Sepulcro) is a Catholic temple located in the Brazilian city of Caxias do Sul, in Rio Grande do Sul. It has neo-Gothic features and houses several works of art inside, including statuary by Michelangelo Zambelli, a mural painting by Aldo Locatelli and a crypt with a wooden sculptural group carved by Benvenuto Conte depicting the scene of the lamentation of the Dead Christ. It is listed as a heritage site by the City Council.

== History ==
An Italian immigrant from Treviso, Benvenuto Conte arrived in Caxias do Sul, then Campo dos Bugres, around 1878 after visiting the Holy Land. He built his house and a small shrine on the current Júlio de Castilhos Avenue. After visiting the Church of the Holy Sepulchre in Jerusalem, Benvenuto tried to reproduce the sacred scene in his sanctuary. In hardwood and life-size, he created images of four Roman soldiers, Joseph of Arimathea, the Virgin Mary, Mary Magdalene and Mary the mother of James, a boy who, according to legend, collected the crucifixion nails. He also sculpted the Dead Christ with the help of Pietro Stangherlin, who carved his face and hands. With the exception of the Dead Christ, the images have articulated legs and arms and are dressed in fabric costumes. The whole ensemble forms an evocative picture and is kept in a crypt that has belonged to the sanctuary since its construction.

The current building was constructed at the request of Conte to his daughter Genoveva Conte Pieruccini, who fulfilled her father's final wish with the help of the community and the architect Luigi Valiera. It was inaugurated on January 31, 1937, in the presence of Bishop José Barea and replaced the old wooden chapel with a beaten earth floor built by Conte at the end of the 19th century. In 1942, the land was donated to the Diocesan Chancery and passed to the administration of the Parish of Our Lady of Lourdes. The chapel also features important pieces by Michelangelo Zambelli, such as Our Lady of Sorrows (1938) and Our Lord of the Steps (with crystal eyes and real teeth, from 1942). A fresco from 1952 by Aldo Locatelli depicting the resurrection of Christ adorns the ceiling above the main altar. The windows are decorated with a series of 14 stained glass windows depicting scenes from the Way of the Cross, made by Hans Viet & Cia. from Porto Alegre. On July 8, 1983, a fire broke out near the chapel's sacristy, destroying part of the wooden building at the back.

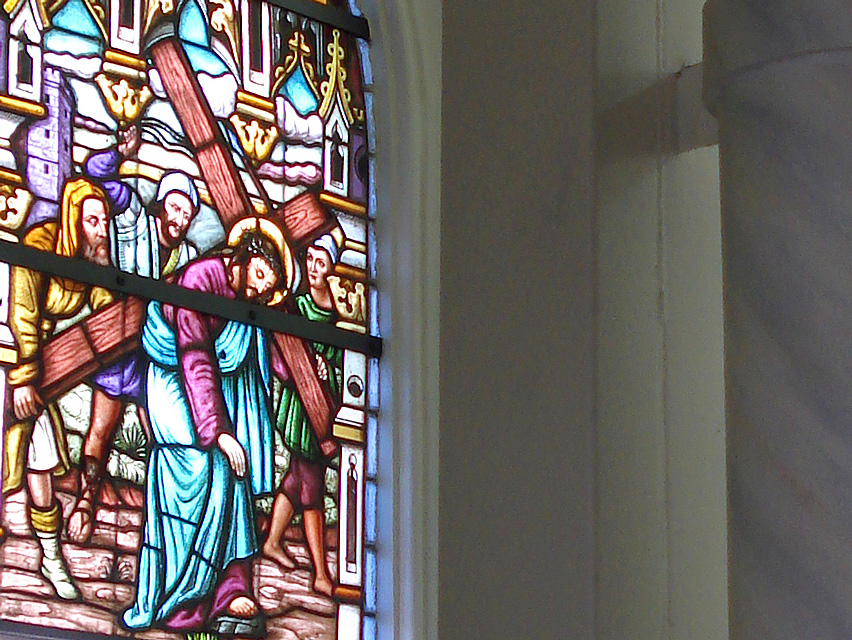
Stained glass.

The chapel was built of stone and solid bricks, with pillars demarcated in relief, ogival openings and pinnacles typical of neo-Gothic architecture. It has a single tower, which functions as a belfry and contains a bronze bell. The tower has a gable roof on each side with a pinnacle at the intersection of the roofs and an iron cross on the structure. The roof is structured in wood and covered in zinc sheets, which replaced the original French tiles. On the central facade, the roof is finished with an attic, while the lateral walls have eaves. Inside, the building is colored in shades of beige, covering the original decorative painting. It has a hydraulic tile floor; in the crypt it has been replaced with ceramic tiles.

On July 30, 2006, the chapel was listed as a historic site by the municipal government due to its artistic and architectural features. In 2019, the City Hall included the Chapel of the Holy Sepulchre in the Aldo Locatelli Cultural Itinerary project, an initiative to promote the history and culture of Caxias do Sul aimed at increasing the population's accessibility to local patrimony and creating instruments to promote preservation.

In 2022, the government of Rio Grande do Sul announced the restoration of the Chapel of the Holy Sepulchre. Scheduled to begin in 2024, the work is estimated to cost R$2 million and will include a new sound system, complete painting of the building, both inside and out, restoration of the building's stained glass windows and sacred art pieces in metal, and a scenic reconfiguration of the crypt, which houses a set of images carved in wood.

== Traditions ==
The chapel host several special ceremonies and festivities. The most popular are the Transladação (English: Translocation), when the image of Our Lady of Sorrows was carried in procession to the Cathedral, and the Procissão do Encontro (Procession of the Encounter). Departing from the Chapel of the Holy Sepulchre, the image of Our Lord of the Steps met the image of Our Lady of Sorrows at the intersection of Guia Lopes Street and Júlio de Castilhos Avenue. There, the Sermão da Lágrima (Sermon of Tears) takes place and the two images return to the chapel.

The Beijo do Senhor Morto (Kiss of the Dead Christ), which takes place on Good Friday, is also part of the rituals. After the kiss, the Virgin of Sorrows encounters the Dead Christ, who leaves the cathedral. Midway, the two processions unite into one and return to the cathedral, where a mass is held in Dante Alighieri Square.

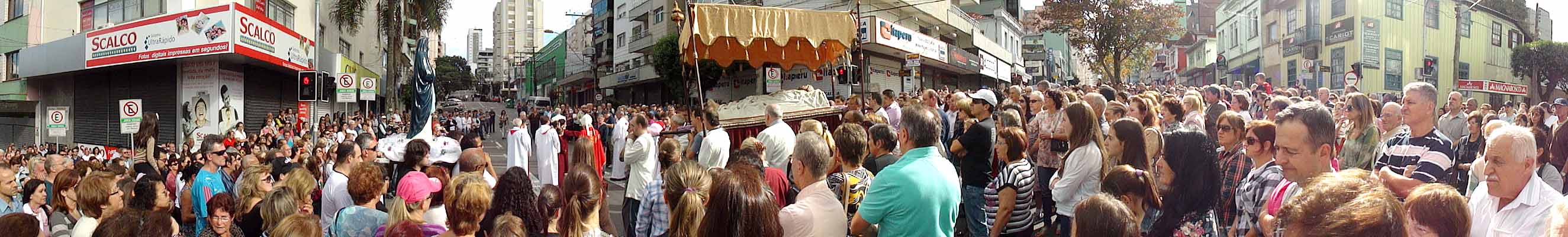
Procissão do Encontro.

== See also ==
- History of Caxias do Sul
