= Júlio de Castilhos Avenue (Caxias do Sul) =

Brazilian road

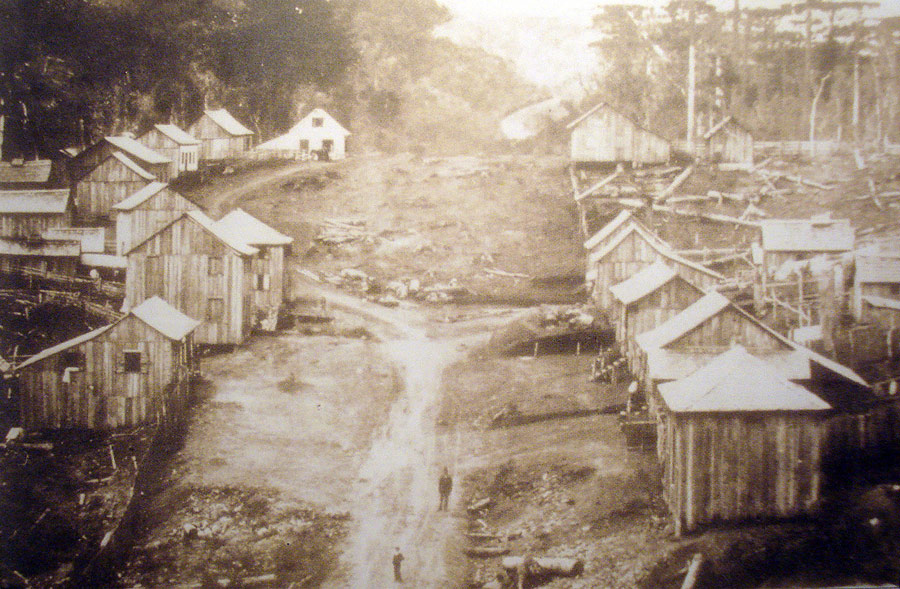
Júlio de Castilhos Avenue around 1880. On the right, in the background, is the place that would become Dante Alighieri Square.

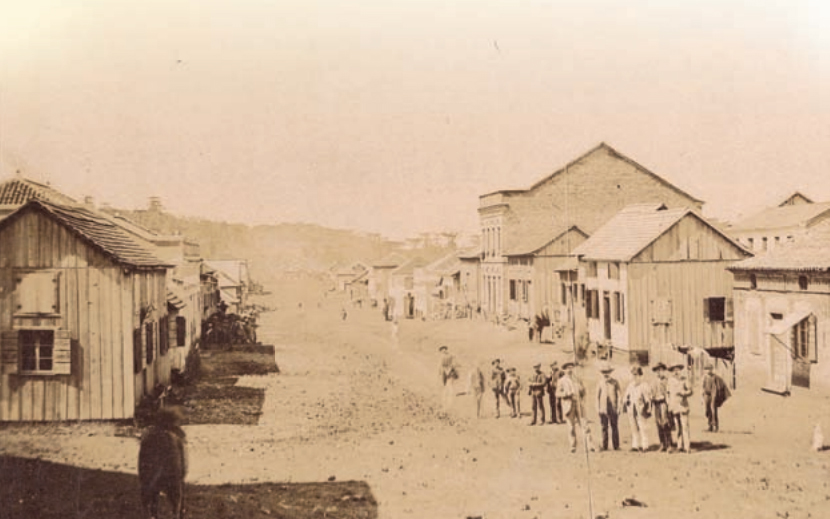
View of a stretch of road around 1890.

Júlio de Castilhos Avenue is the oldest street in the Brazilian city of Caxias do Sul. Its route incorporated an old indigenous path, and until the first decades of the 20th century, it was nothing more than an unpaved road, even though it was the city's main street from the beginning. Later, it was extended, urbanized and ornamented, remaining with a straight line, with the exception of its end. Its current limits are the Getúlio Vargas Square, in front of the National Monument to the Immigrant, to the east, in Petrópolis neighborhood, and the junction with Rubem Bento Alves Avenue, to the west, in Cinquentenário neighborhood. Its evolution is intertwined with the history of Caxias, whose urban center remains as the main point of the city, and still holds several architectural examples of interest.

== History ==
Its origins date back to before the official foundation of the settlement, in 1875, which began as an Italian colony. The stretch that the street occupies borders an old indigenous camp known as the Campo dos Bugres. Later, European troopers and explorers started using this path, which in the middle of the 19th century began to be definitively cleared, without, however, a real road being opened. Urbanization began shortly after the foundation of the Fundos de Nova Palmira colony, situated on the edge of the Rio Grande do Sul plateau, with its official headquarters being established in Nova Milano, in the 1st of the 17 leagues in which the colony was divided. Today, the site is located in the municipality of Farroupilha.

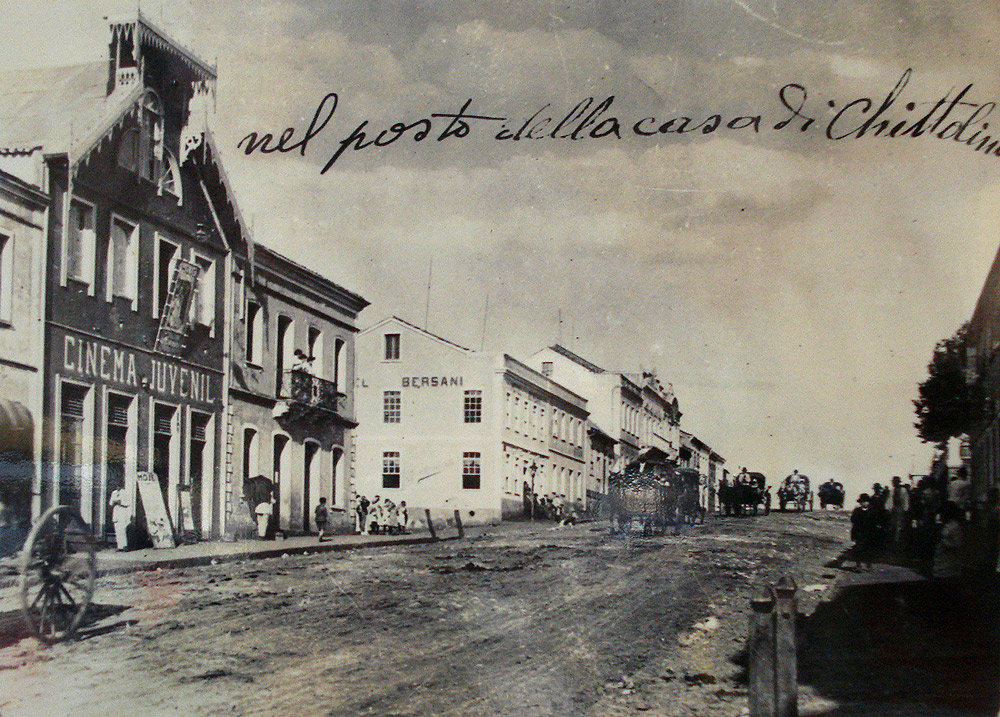
A stretch of the avenue in 1910; on the left, the building of the city's first film theater, the Juvenil Cinema.

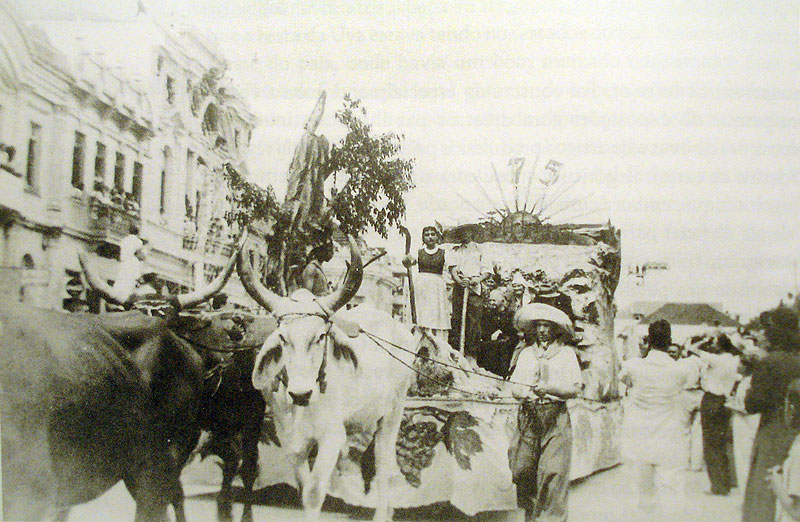
Grape Festival parade in 1950.

In 1876, engineer Augusto Francisco Gonçalves, a government official, apparently at the suggestion of Luiz Antônio Feijó Júnior, determined that the colonial headquarters should be transferred from Nova Milano to the Campo dos Bugres, about 15 km to the east, situated on the border of the 5th and 7th leagues, exactly over the old Indigenous camp and path, which began to be deforested, filled in, and cleared. Extending the indigenous passage, the Rua Grande (English: Big Street) was opened. The center of the settlement was marked with the opening of the Dante Alighieri Square, where the Mother Church was built, bordered on its north side by Rua Grande. In 1877, the colony was baptized Caxias, and in 1878, when the first urban plan was discarded because of its errors, the colony's director Luiz Manoel de Azevedo drew up the second layout of the center, following the Roman grid model. In it, the Rua Grande was already named Silveira Martins Street, and occupied only nine blocks in length. Soon, stores and boarding houses were established there, as well as public festivals and meetings, but the suburban extensions to the east and west, where the old road penetrated into the countryside, would remain very precarious until the beginning of the 20th century. On one side, the street made the connection with São Sebastião do Caí, an important commercial center that supplied mainly the colonies from Sinos River Valley and the center of the state, as well as the capital Porto Alegre; on the other side, it communicated with the paths of the troopers who came from the cowsheds above the plateau with their trade troops and herds. Between 1882 and 1884, the central stretch was finally straightened, the buildings that had been erected without order were demolished, and the implementation of the urbanization plan began.

In 1890, the Silveira Martins Street was twelve blocks long. In 1893, the toponym was changed again, honoring the former president of the province Júlio de Castilhos, but it was still called street. Soon after, public lighting began to be installed with gas lamps, replaced in 1913 by electric lamps. At the beginning of the 20th century, the street was still unpaved, but some stretches already had sidewalks, and many residences and other elegant buildings, such as the Scotti and Sassi palaces and the Central Theater, were already visible. In the 1920s, with the implementation of a new Code of Ordinances, new wooden buildings were forbidden in the center, as well as the expansion of existing ones; stricter rules for construction in general and more modern concepts about habitability, comfort, safety and hygiene were also introduced, which influenced the configuration of the buildings. The new regulations also caused the gradual removal of the many industries that had settled in the center and a retreat of the lower class, making the central region a stronghold of the elite and the middle class. In 1939, Júlio de Castilhos Street became an avenue; at the time, it stretched from João Pessoa Square to Angelina Michielon Street.

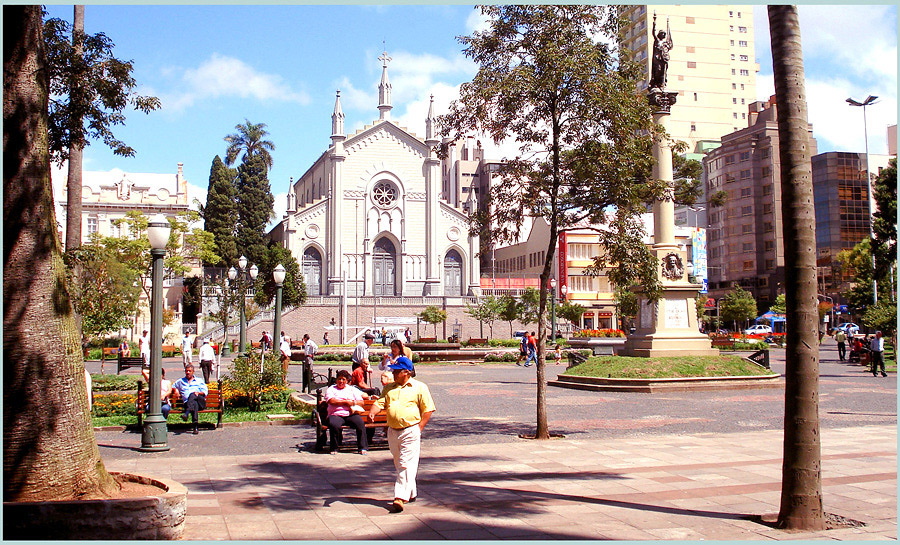
The period when the central stretch was merged to the Dante Alighieri Square. The photo shows part of the new sidewalk.

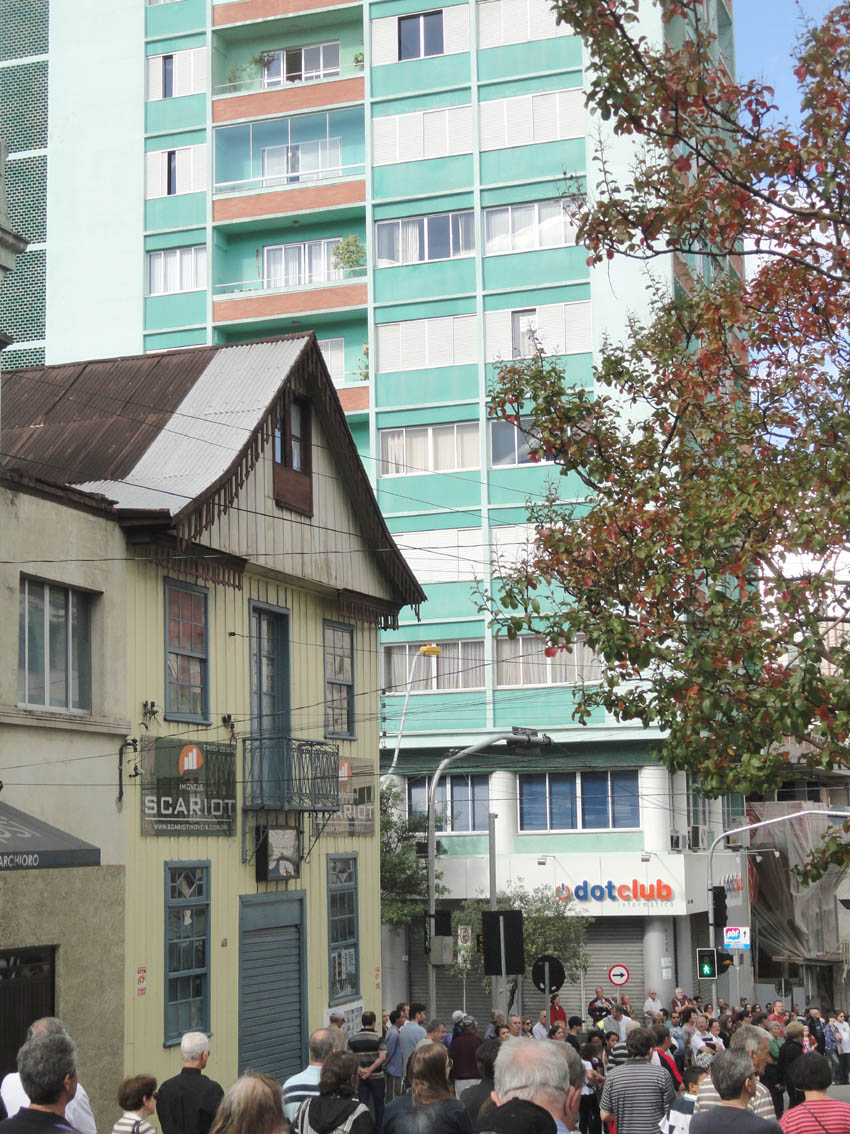
The contrast between the old and the modern on the avenue.

Throughout the century, the avenue was paved, urbanized, embellished, stretched, and began to delimit the northern face of the Cinquentenário Park, one of the main urban parks in the city. This progress was favored by the construction, in the 1950s, of the National Monument to the Immigrant in the Petrópolis neighborhood, which today marks the eastern end of the avenue, and in the 1960s, of the old Normal School in the Cinquentenário neighborhood, the first teacher training school in the city, today known as Cristóvão de Mendoza College, near its current western end. In 1958, the Monument to Italy was inaugurated at João Pessoa Square, at the corner with Feijó Júnior Street, in the São Pelegrino neighborhood.

Caxias was growing very fast at this time. The General Plan would be modified several times from the 1950s on, and complemented with legislation on buildings, new parameters for building heights, construction materials, sidewalks, alignments, distances, aesthetics, and other aspects, with special treatment in the central area, changing the urban profile of this region and starting a quick verticalization and densification. In the late 1970s, the section that runs through the Dante Square was closed and transformed into a tree-lined sidewalk, but the obstruction of the city's main artery caused traffic jams throughout the center. The reforms were reversed in 2003 and vehicle traffic flowed again, but with narrowed lanes.

In 2007, a new General Plan defined a Special Sector in the city center called Historic Center, placing it under particular regulation due to its differentiated characteristics and ratifying the determinations of the 1990 Organic Law that protected properties more than 50 years old. Around the same time, visual pollution in historic buildings began to become a concern, and measures were taken to remove excessive advertisements and signs from commercial buildings. The avenue has a strong presence of commercial businesses, with institutions, clinics, food stores, and other establishments, as well as being densely populated. In the last few years, traffic in the area has become complicated as the number of vehicles and pedestrians circulating in the downtown area has grown. There have also been increasing complaints about the degradation of the area with the formation of drug dealing, robbery and prostitution spots.

The avenue has historical buildings along most of its route, such as the Pompéia Hospital, the João Spadari Adami Municipal Historical Archive, the first Methodist Church, the Chapel of the Holy Sepulchre, and the Saldanha Bookstore, but the main concentration is in the Dante Alighieri Square section, where more than half of the buildings situated on the avenue are heritage properties, including the French and Brazilian Bank, the Sassi House, the old Central Cinema, the Scotti House, and the Clube Juvenil Headquarters. The square and the avenue are the most traditional places in the city; since the beginning, the most important things have happened there, such as marches, revolts, protests, political and religious gatherings, crimes, celebrations, the Grape Festival parades, and school and civic parades. Today, the place still preserves its original vocation as the center of the city. However, the vast majority of the early architecture has given way to modern construction, and the memory of the area has been lost, although official bodies have been programming heritage and memorial activities.

== Historical images ==
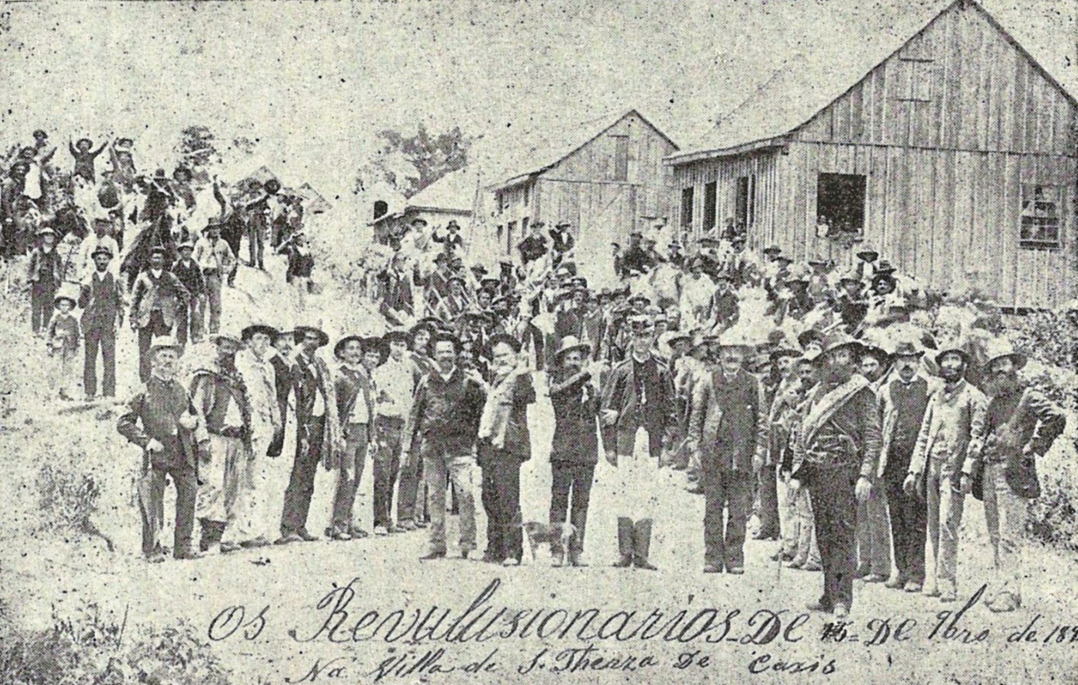
Leaders of the first Settlers' Revolt concentrated on Júlio de Castilhos Avenue in 1891.

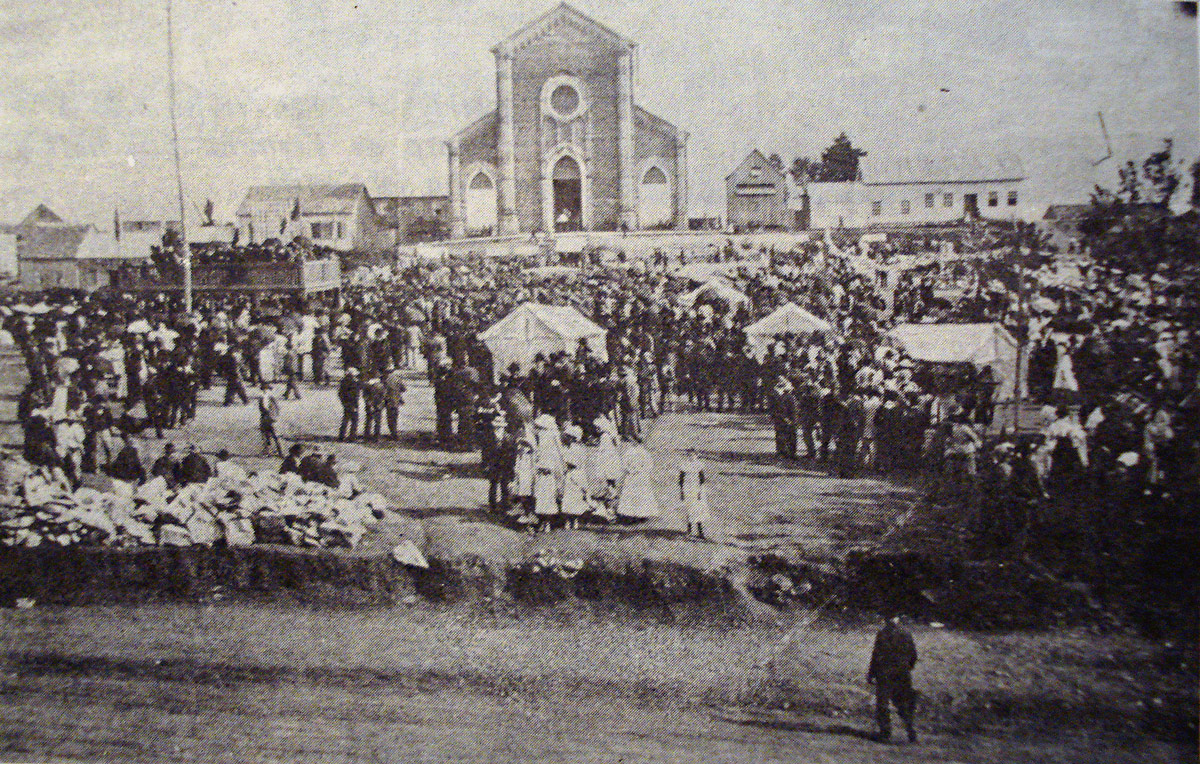
View of the Dante Alighieri Square and part of the avenue, still without any urbanization, around 1900.

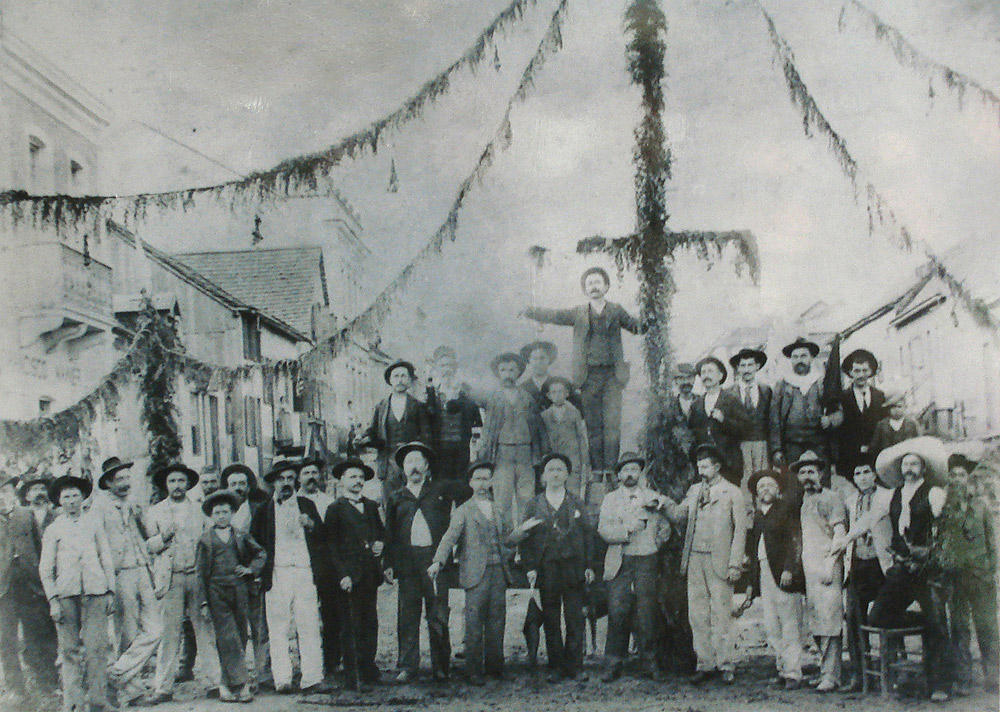
Celebration on the avenue at the 1900 New Year's festivities.

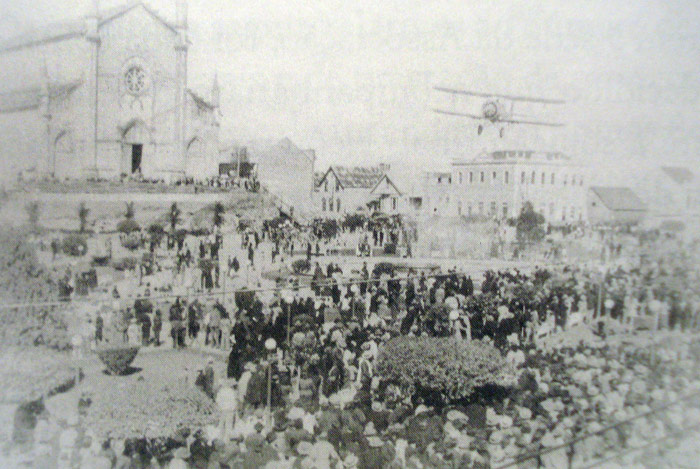
Political concentration on the avenue and in the square at the proclamation of the Estado Novo.

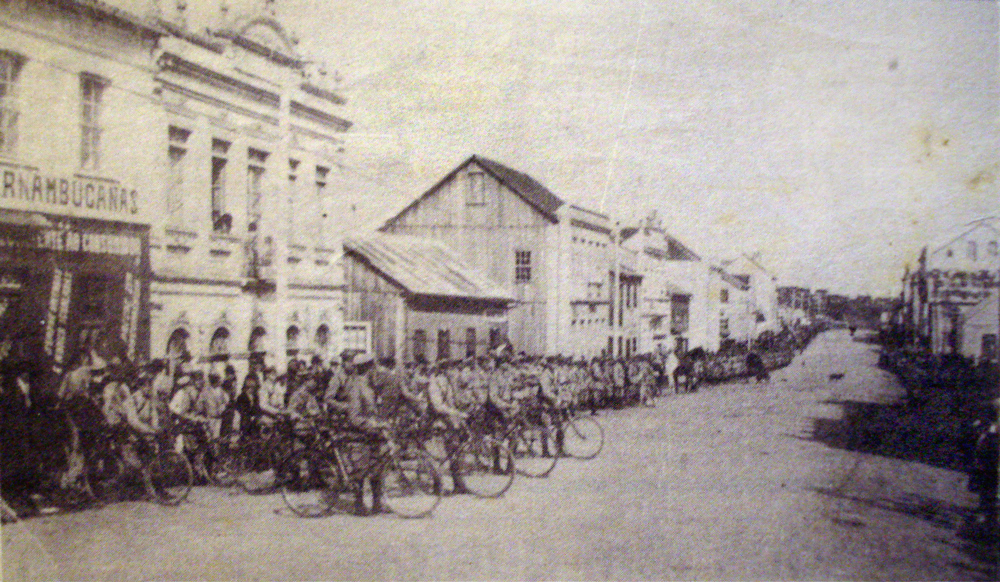
Military parade in the 1930s.
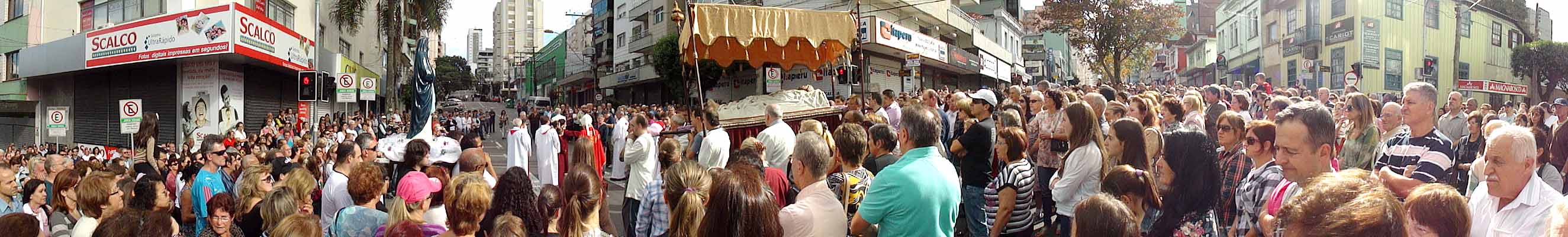
The 2012 Encounter Procession, one of the most traditional in Caxias: Our Lady of Sorrows leaves the Chapel of the Holy Sepulcher and meets the Dead Lord, who leaves the Cathedral, at the intersection of the Guia Lopes Street and Júlio de Castilhos Avenue.

== Main buildings ==
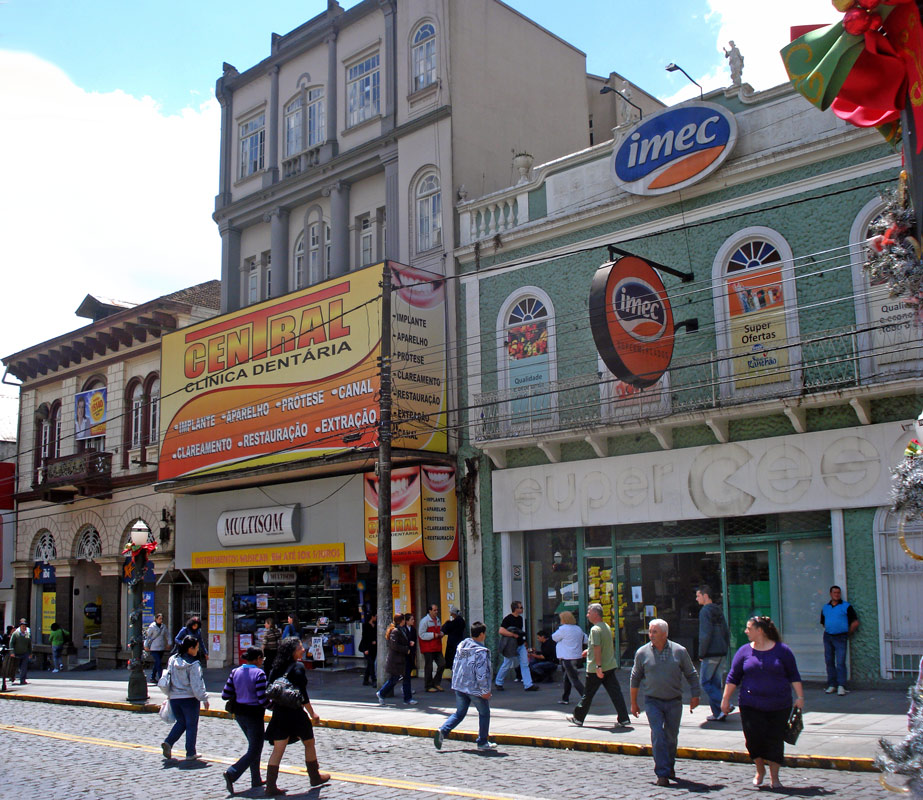
Visual pollution in the French and Brazilian Bank building and others.

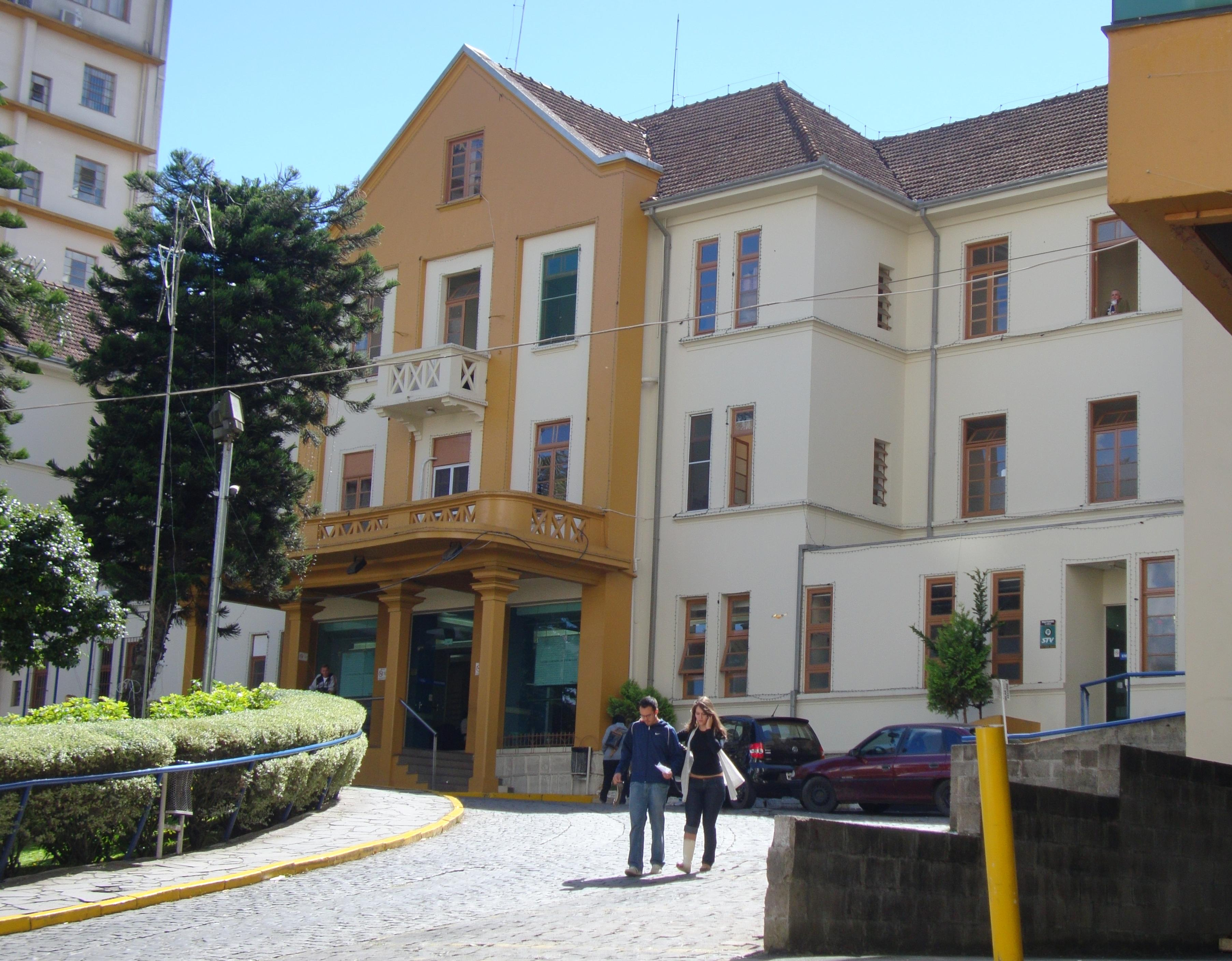
Pompéia Hospital.

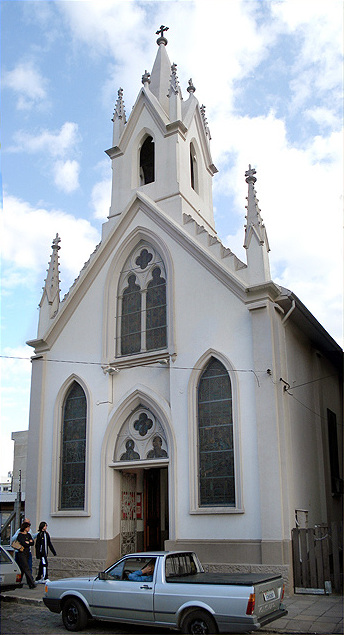
Chapel of the Holy Sepulchre.

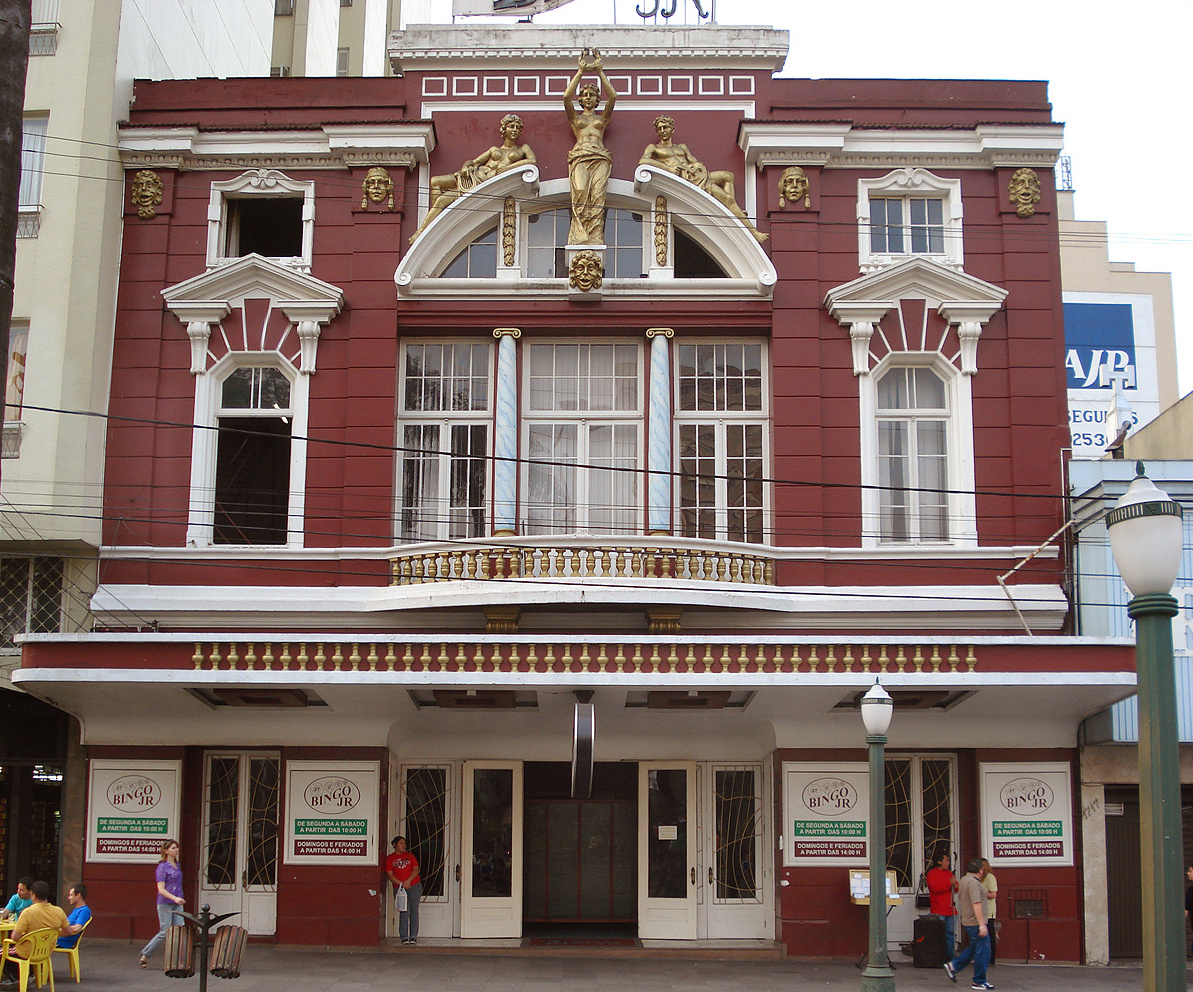
The old Central Cinema.
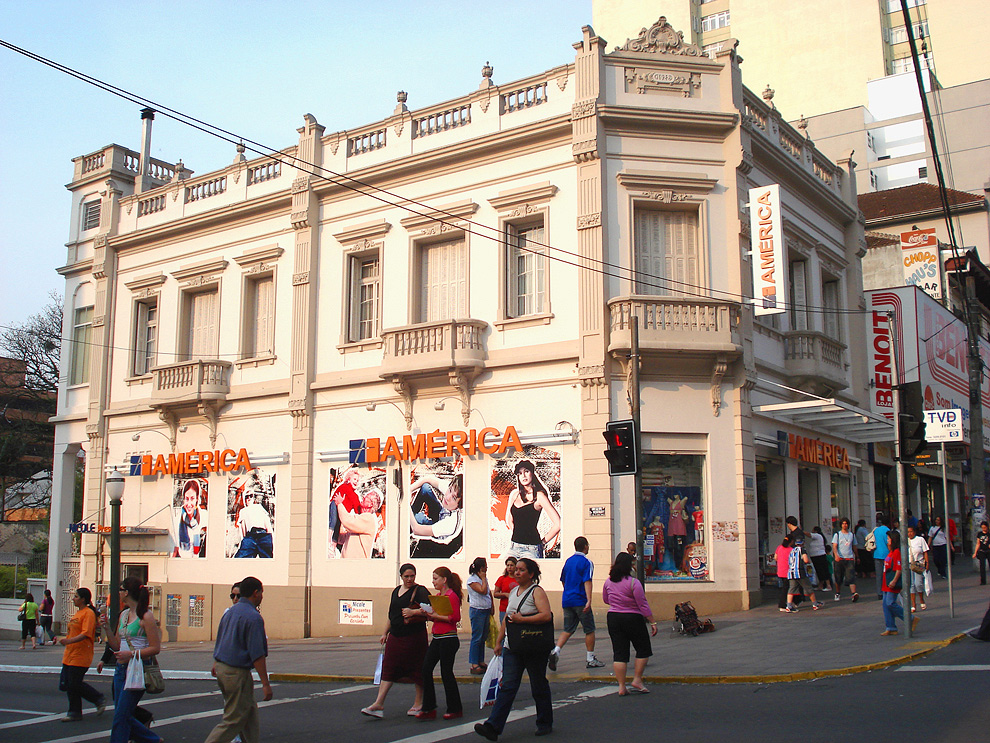
Sassi House.

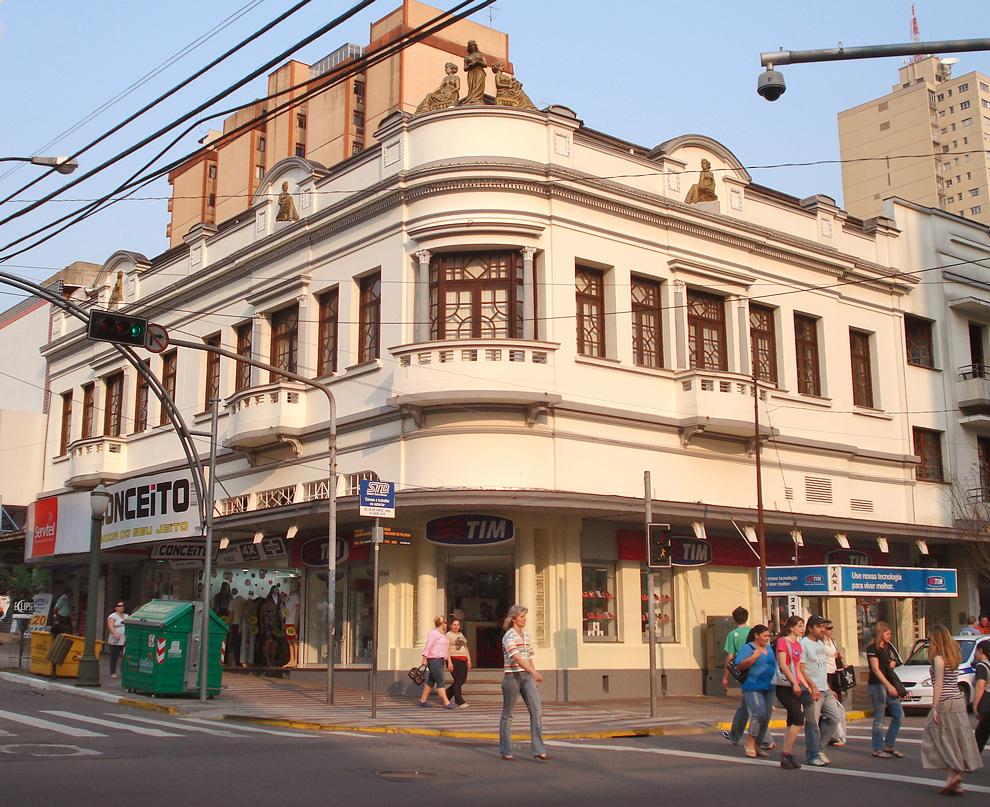
Saldanha Bookstore.

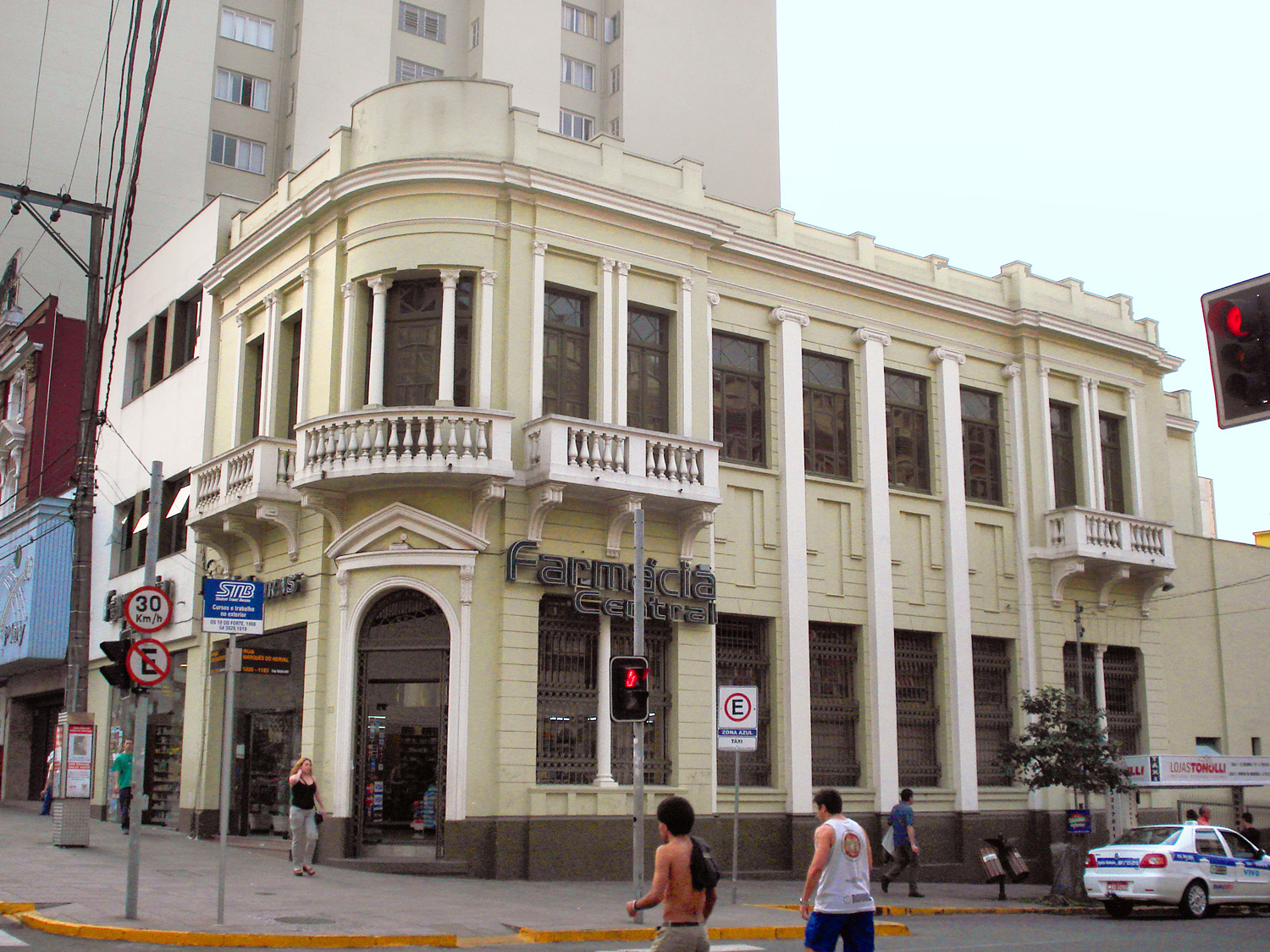
Scotti House.

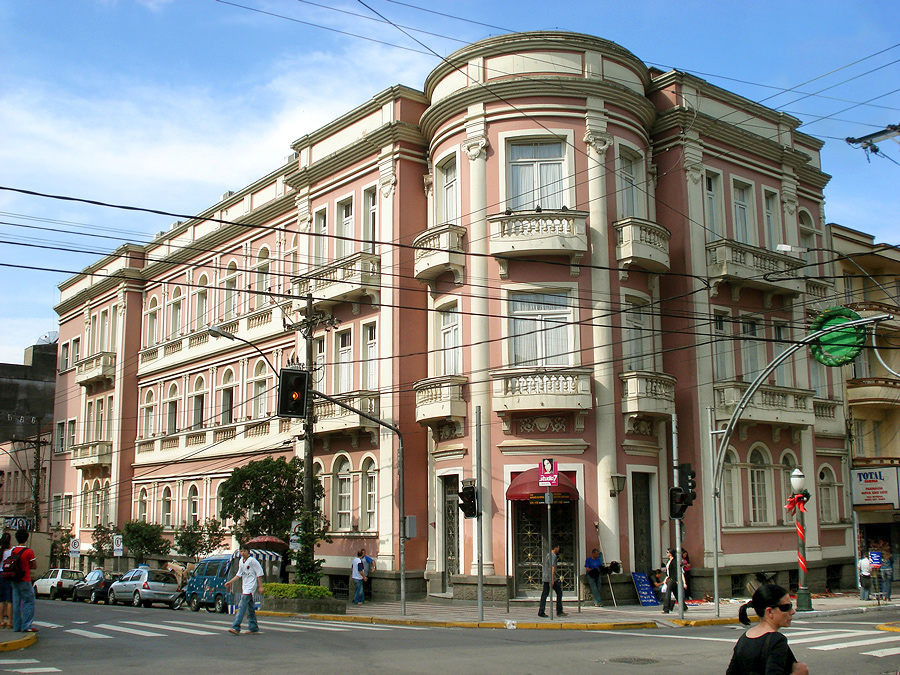
Clube Juvenil Headquarters.

== See also ==
- History of Caxias do Sul
- Historic Center of Caxias do Sul
