= Historic Center of Caxias do Sul =

Special sector of Caxias do Sul

29°10′5.36″S 51°10′45.7″W

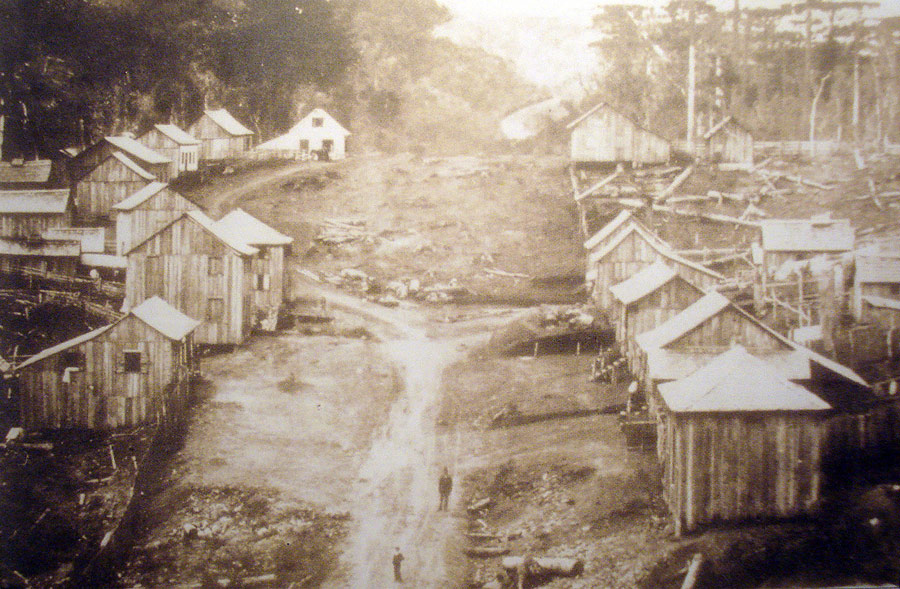
The early urban nucleus of Caxias do Sul around 1880, showing the opening of Rua Grande and the future Dante Alighieri Square.

The Historic Center of Caxias do Sul (Portuguese: Centro Histórico de Caxias do Sul) is a Special Sector of the city contemplated in its General Plan and regulated by specific legislation. It comprises the region that was first urbanized, located around the Dante Alighieri square and limited by the streets Os 18 do Forte, Bento Gonçalves, Alfredo Chaves, and Moreira César. The Historic Center has been the vital core of Caxias do Sul since its origin and has undergone profound changes since the early days, but it still preserves its original urban layout and a number of buildings of great architectural and historical interest. However, it has suffered from frequent traffic jams and the degradation of some stretches.

== History ==
=== Origins ===
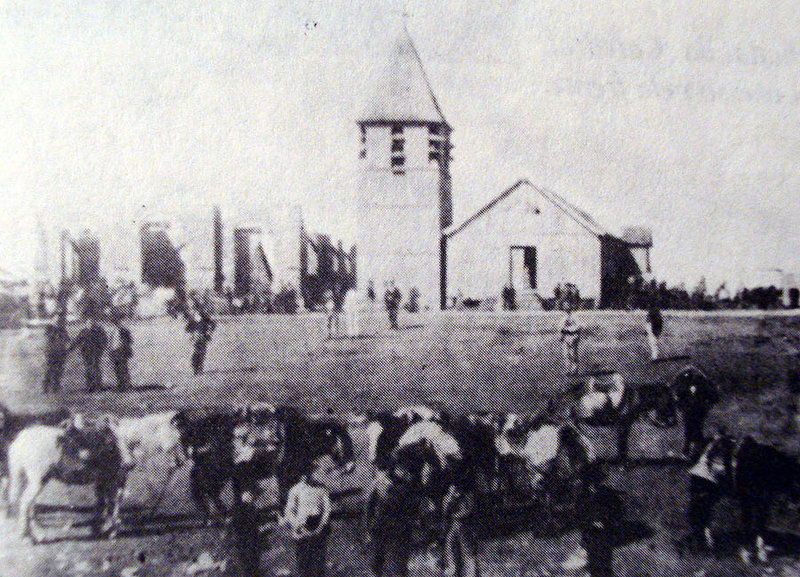
First Mother Church of Caxias, around 1890.

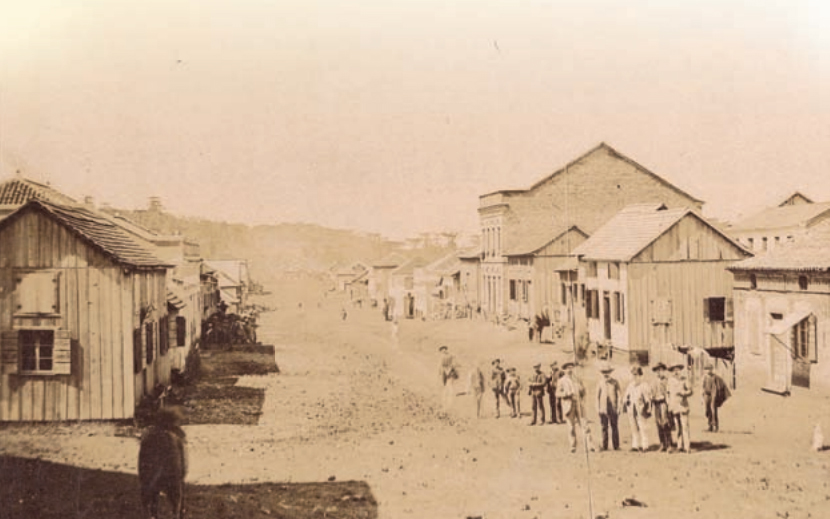
A section of the Rua Grande around 1880–90.

The present Historic Center of Caxias do Sul began its formation together with the city itself. Conceived as a colony, Caxias was part of a project of the Imperial Government that aimed to populate empty spaces, form a non-slave labor force and whiten the Brazilian population; to this end, European settlers were chosen. The colony was founded in 1875 with a headquarters in Nova Milano, through the occupation of vacant land, attracting large waves of foreigners, mainly Italians.

In 1876 the headquarters of the colony was transferred to the Historic Center region, organized around a broad space, later named Dante Alighieri Square, where the Mother Church was built. The area chosen was crossed by ancient indigenous routes and, at one point, there was a large open field with water sources that was called Campo dos Bugres by the explorers who had previously traveled this region. At the time of Caxias' foundation, Campo dos Bugres was being used as a resting place for muleteers who traveled between Campos de Cima da Serra, where cowsheds were flourishing, and São Sebastião do Caí, the main commercial warehouse in the center of the state and a mandatory stop for immigrants. In the highlands, the idea was to create a rural colony with a small urban administrative headquarters. The intention was that the main urbanization of this region would occur where Flores da Cunha is today, but it ended up being concentrated around the center of Caxias do Sul, which grew fast and established itself as an important commercial warehouse, helping to supply the neighboring colonies. Through its area, most of the regional production flowed to São Sebastião, which had a fluvial port where the connection with the markets in the capital and center of the state was made.

After some abandoned projects, on January 10, 1879, the Board of the Land and Population Commission approved a plan by Luiz Manoel de Azevedo for the urban center, idealized according to the Roman grid, where a layout of straight streets cross each other perpendicularly forming a chessboard. By this time, several houses and businesses had been built in the center, creating a low-rise settlement, but with the implementation of the official route many of these early buildings were demolished. Soon the so-called Rua Grande (English: Big Street), today Júlio de Castilhos Avenue, appeared as the spine of the emerging settlement. By 1884 the straightening of the main streets had been completed. In this same year the colony was transformed into a district of São Sebastião do Caí.

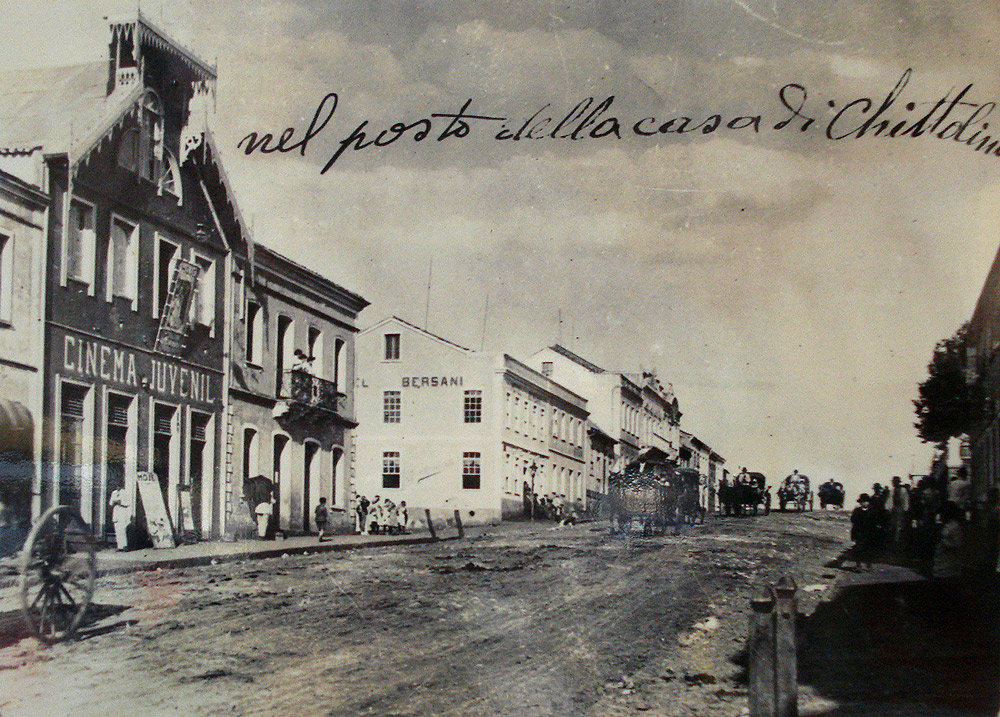
The Cine Juvenil, the first cinema in Caxias, in 1910. Detail of the decorative work on the wooden facade.

The administrative change was unpopular. The settlers had to travel almost 60 km to the municipal seat to pay their taxes and communicate with the authorities, losing a week of work due to the very poor roads. After long negotiations with the state government and demonstrations of having grown enough to be able to govern itself, the district was emancipated in 1890, becoming the Village of Santa Teresa de Caxias, placed under the direction of a Governing Board. The board organized the new municipality, serving as an executive as well as a legislative body, granting the first laws: a Posture Code, the Internal Rules and the Organic Law. These laws defined the rules of public administration and delimited the scope of powers, but when it comes to the Historic Center the board should be remembered for establishing the first norms for urbanization and building in the center.

At this time, almost all buildings were made of wood, with few examples in masonry. Even large industrial pavilions were built in wood, with the araucaria being the most used, as it was abundant in the region at the time. The paving of the center would take a long time. Until Colonel José Pena de Moraes took office, the center would have had dirt roads with gravel, and only a few streets with paved sidewalks. The main focus in the first decades was the organization of the Dante Square and Rua Grande, where works for the flattening and lowering of the land began, a process delayed and complicated by the existence of a large quarry in the area.

Urbanization in the area developed along original lines that were the result of the creation of a new culture in the colonial region that incorporated the cultural heritage of the immigrants and revealed their adaptation to the specific resources and uses of the Luso-Brazilian tradition. In general, the settlers were skilled at building in stone, but did not know the national woods, whose properties took some decades to learn, master, and apply this knowledge to a vernacular style typified by the single-family house of one or two floors, often used as a business on the first floor and residence on the second floor. Overall, these spacious and comfortable buildings, although quite rustic, could have ornamental details in balconies, wainscoting, and window frames.

=== Consolidation and growth ===
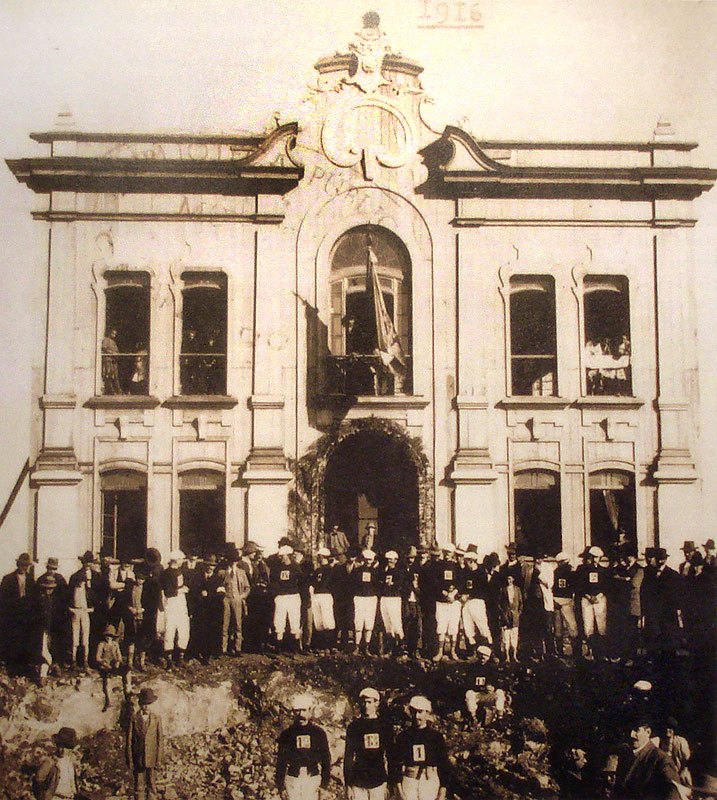
The Clube Juvenil in 1909. This headquarters was demolished.

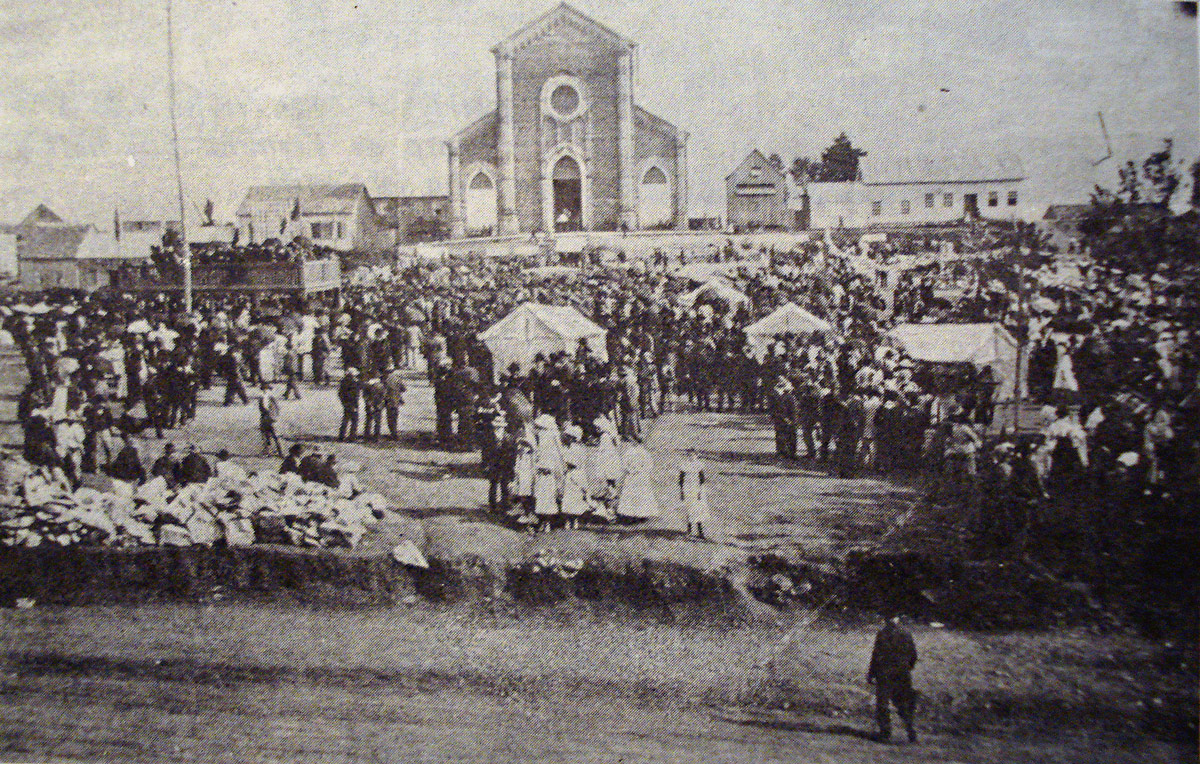
Santa Teresa's Kermesse in Dante Alighieri Square with the Cathedral of Caxias in the background, in 1910.

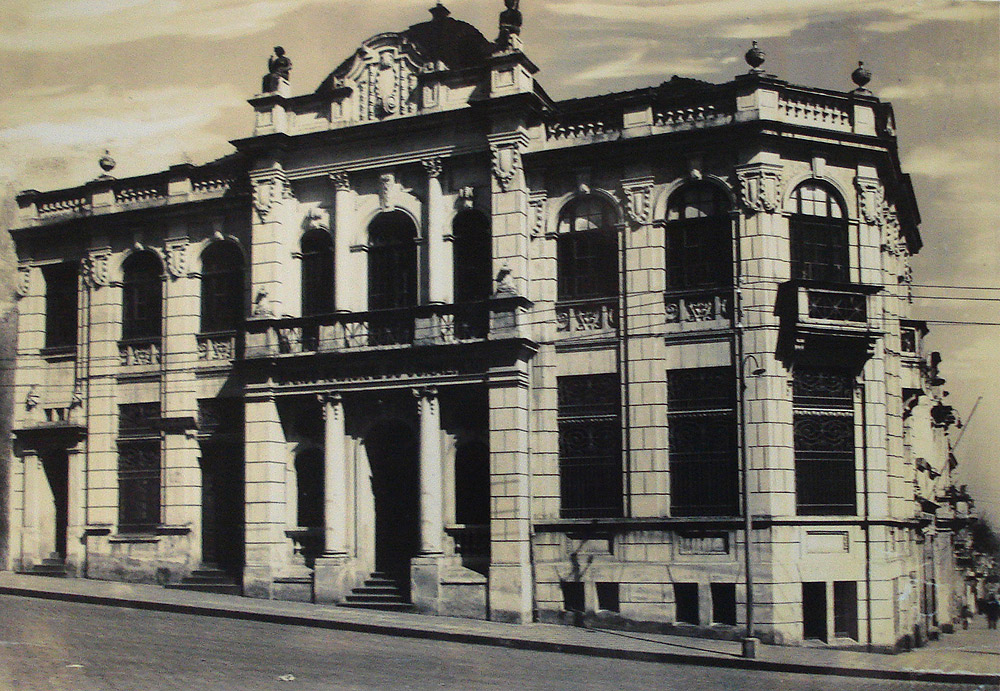
Demolished headquarters of the National Bank of Commerce.

Despite its precarious urban planning, in the beginning of the 20th century the center had 3 thousand residents, with 426 single-story houses and 76 two-story houses, including those with commercial use. The center, more than a housing area, became the main economic, political and religious center of the colony, with its main public events and festivities taking place around the Dante Square. By 1900 the old Mother Church had been replaced by an imposing new masonry building, and there were a number of commercial houses, workshops, manufactures, and 36 industries in activity. In a few years industrial buildings would multiply their presence in the central region.

A leap in growth was made between 1909 and 1910 with the consolidation of the passage to Campos de Cima da Serra through the construction of the Korff Bridge and with the arrival of the railroad in the city, which linked Caxias directly to Porto Alegre and bypassed the neighboring municipalities of São Sebastião do Caí. The opening of these roads gave a great boost to commercial development. On the same day the train arrived, the village was elevated to the status of city. At this time Caxias already had an expressive agricultural and wine production, the industry was diversifying fast, and the city was getting ready to increase even more its old role of dynamic commercial warehouse, becoming one of the main economies of the state. Therefore, the expectations of the former administrators of the state, who saw in colonization a salvation for the decline of the charque culture, that made Rio Grande do Sul rich in the 19th century, were fulfilled.

Due to the accelerated economic growth, a colonial elite of wealthy merchants and industrialists proud of their accomplishments soon formed, who began to foster a cosmopolitan erudite culture, but still heavily dependent on Italian culture. In the first decades of the 20th century, newspapers, theaters, literary, artistic, political, social, sports and charitable associations appeared, and this flourishing was accompanied by an architectural and urban renewal in the center. Streets begin to be paved, Dante Square takes on its classical form, and changes in building regulations begin to prohibit wood construction and encourage masonry. A series of elegant palatial homes began to occupy the center, and sumptuous buildings were erected to house banks, large business houses, and the main clubs and associations. In this process, the lower classes are being pushed out of the center, and soon the industries would also be pushed out, and speculation began.

In 1949, the rather disorderly growth of the urban area imposed the enactment of the first General Plan, establishing new guidelines for sanitation, alignments, distances, construction aesthetics, and other aspects. At this time the center began to be verticalized. In a short time the General Plan became obsolete, requiring successive reformulations in the 1950s and 1970s to adapt to the intense population swelling that the city was experiencing due to the arrival of the residents from the countryside and other parts of Brazil, attracted by the wealth of Caxias. However, while progress was advancing at a rapid pace, the colonial, art nouveau, eclectic and déco architecture of the center was being destroyed at the same speed.

In Marchioro & Calcagno's analysis, from the 1940s to the present, the General Plans promoted several advances, but showed many flaws and contradictions, revealing a lack of long-term planning. Furthermore, its application has been difficult and controversial, favoring the densification of the center and accentuating the depopulation of the rural area. These problems have not prevented the Historic Center from remaining the most dynamic area of the city to this day. On the other hand, this interval also evidenced a profound urban crisis, since the primitive urban plan with its narrow streets was maintained. In the last decades the number of vehicles circulating has exceeded the traffic capacity of these streets, the main public transportation lines in the urban area have started to pass through the center, and traffic jams have become daily. Lately there has been also the degradation of some streets and the increase in the rates of violence, drug dealing and prostitution, problems that have been generating continuous complaints from the population.

=== Preservation ===
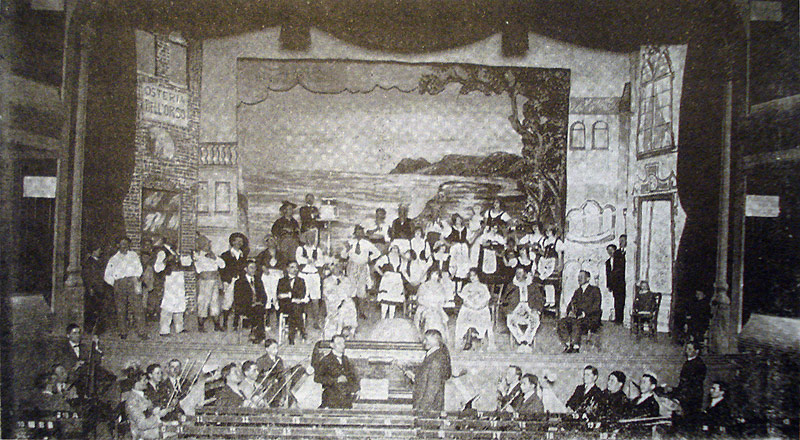
Operetta staged in 1922 at the now extinct Cine Teatro Ópera.

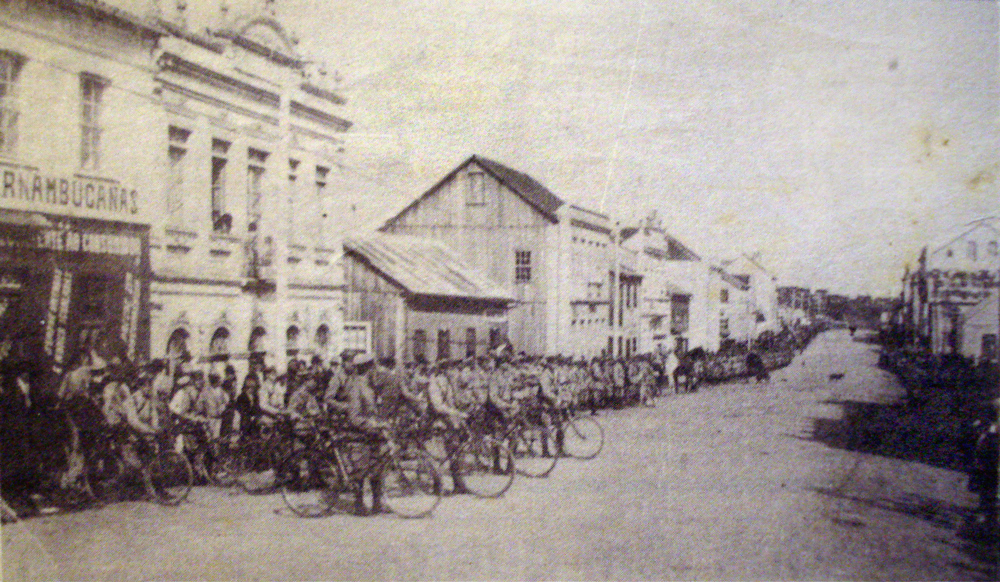
A stretch of Júlio de Castilhos Avenue, next to the Historic Center, in 1930.

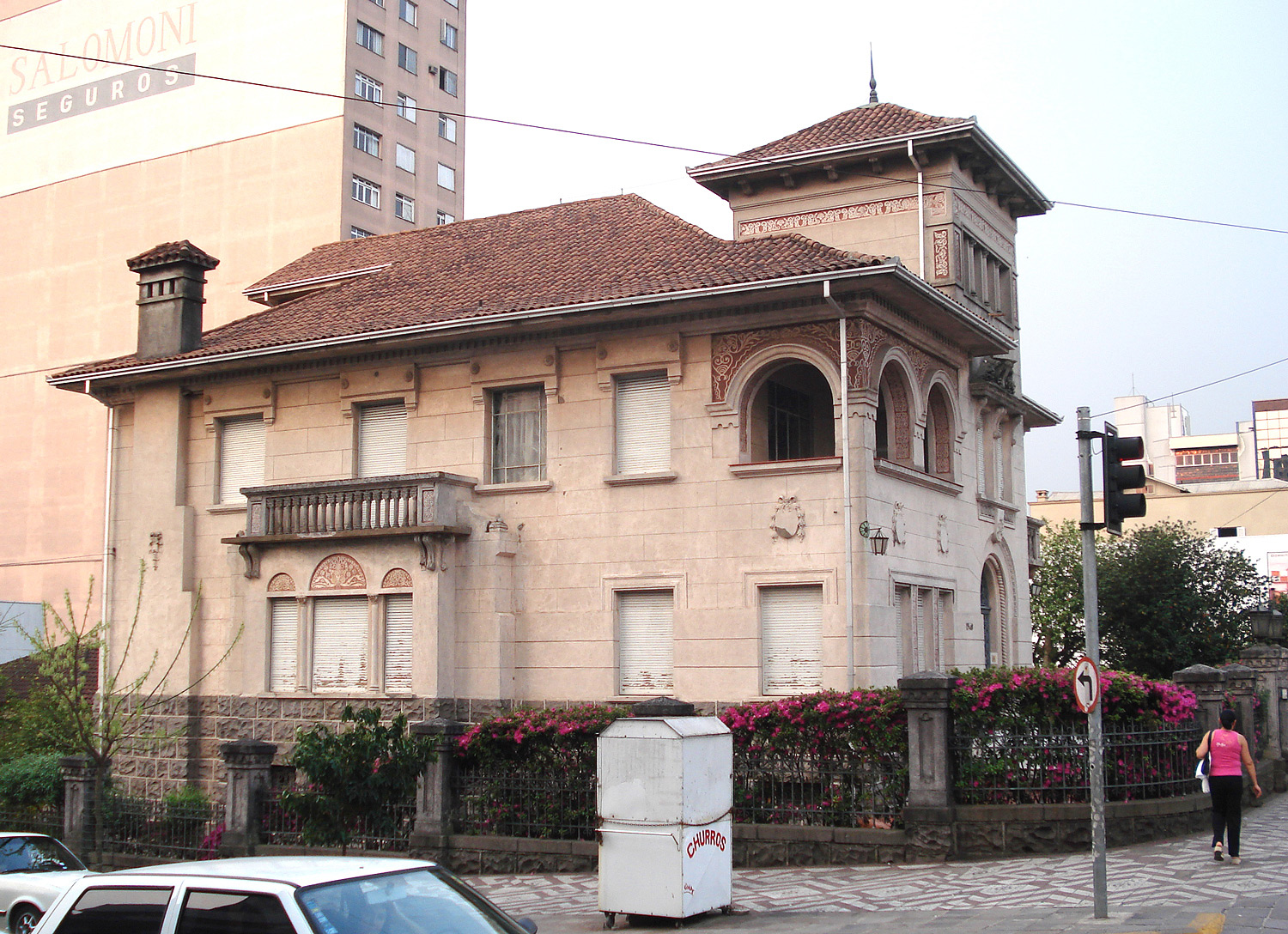
Eberle Palace.

Heritage awareness is a recent progress in the city. For a long time Caxias do Sul did not give the proper attention to its artistic and architectural legacy, resulting in the loss of numerous old buildings of high artistic, social and historical value. Part of this phenomenon happened due to the massive repression of Italian ancestral memory during the Vargas era, when the federal government sought to form a new cohesive and unified national identity by deciding to eradicate all foreignisms. During this period, even speaking in Italian became a crime; in fact, many cases of coercion, violence, and imprisonment of immigrants and their descendants who dared to manifest their ancestral customs and folklore were recorded. According to Ribeiro, such repression led to an effort of self-censorship on the part of the Italians themselves and their descendants, discouraging the cultivation of memory even in their own homes and interrupting, as of 1938, the celebration of the Grape Festival. This process was dissolved in the 1950s, when the official instances sought a reconciliation with the foreign past, and the typically Italian contribution to the local society became more valued. However, a deep-seated rejection of everything related to the past has remained, which to this day has not been entirely reversed and has been an important cause of the historical neglect of the inhabitants of Caxias do Sul towards their historical heritage, causing a wave of demolitions of buildings of notable historical interest or aesthetic quality, such as the Cine Teatro Ópera, the National Bank of Commerce, the first headquarters of the Clube Juvenil and the Tobias Barreto de Menezes Cultural Center, as well as old houses of traditional families.

In this process of rescue and revaluation of the Italian heritage some landmarks must be mentioned. The first was the reorganization and reopening of the Municipal Museum in 1975, which started collecting scattered historical and artistic pieces, forming a large collection, and dedicating itself to research, whose results were published in a special bulletin. In the following year the Municipal Historical Archive was created, starting a fundamental work to rescue the written and photographic documentation regarding the city. A little later, a department of historical heritage was created in the Secretariat of Culture, which was responsible for conducting a survey of assets of heritage interest and initiating the process of registration based on pre-defined technical criteria. Another important initiative was the 1999 Organic Law, which determined that all buildings older than 50 years be submitted to a specialized analysis by the Municipal Council for Historical and Cultural Heritage if there were any intention of renovation or demolition. Finally, in the 2007 General Plan a Special Sector in the city center called Historic Center was defined and put under particular regulation due to its differentiated characteristics, endorsing the determinations of the Organic Law about properties older than 50 years.

Despite this institutional and legal support, the Historic Center has only recently become a living reality for the residents of Caxias do Sul. Research by Rosemary Brum in the 1990s stated that the Historic Center was invisible to locals, and only a few people still preserved memories about it. Its current features are the result of profound urban transformations throughout the 20th century, with few of its original buildings remaining. However, today the center is already the object of academic studies and has been integrated into the city's tourist route, with scheduled tours and other activities that seek to recover the legacy of this region so full of meaning and that still preserves several important buildings. At the same time, legislation was defined to minimize the problem of visual pollution in historic buildings that were being covered with advertising signs and suffering from interventions that distorted their characteristics.

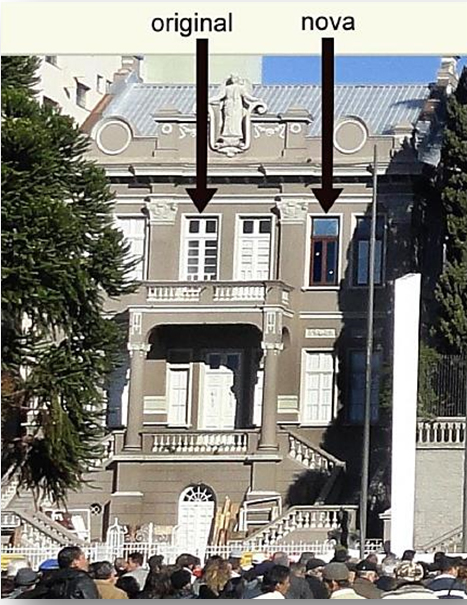
Ongoing replacement of the original window frames with different new elements in the Canonical House.

Another problem that negatively affects historic buildings is the composition of the Heritage Council, the body that approves renovation or restoration projects. In order to democratize the decisions, only a small minority of council members have a background in history or heritage, leading to a loss of focus on the issue of conservation as a science and giving way to personal opinions in the discussions, which are mostly made up of civil servants from other areas, government and community representatives, lawyers, and various representatives of the construction and architecture business. This issue leads to the problem of so-called "restoration" practices that diverge from the standards consensually established in international heritage charters, of which Brazil is a signatory, but that are approved by the council.

Municipal Law No. 7,495 of October 19, 2012 prohibits "the demolition, renovation or alteration of the form or facade of the property mentioned in items II and III of art. 1," which covers the listed property and the buildings, urban groups and sites of historical, artistic, archaeological, paleontological, ecological, landscape and scientific value located in the Special Sector of Heritage, Historical, Cultural and Landscape Interest and in the Special Sector of the Historic Center. However, in recent years several restoration projects, even for important heritage properties, have ignored legislation and internationally accepted practices, producing interventions that disfigure the original characteristics of the buildings, causing them to lose their authenticity through so-called "revitalizations" or "retrofits", which are in fact decorative or utilitarian modernizations that focus on adapting the building to a new use, usually commercial, without paying attention to its symbolic and documentary value and to the preservation of the authenticity of the ensemble, which are the central values in all international conservation charters. According to researcher Marcelo Caon, "the concept of revitalization goes in the opposite direction of document preservation and, instead of using it as an elucidative object of memories, social practices, and the misfortunes of urban expansion in certain periods, it gains a new meaning that generates a demand for services, leisure, and attributes values to certain groups".

Historic buildings of great importance in the center are still being slowly disfigured by repetitive small arbitrary interventions, such as the Canonical House and the Cathedral. Another typical example of the utilitarian and market approach to heritage assets, disregarding essential documentary aspects, was the recent "revitalization" of the Metallurgical Abramo Eberle complex, which originally occupied almost a city block and was composed of several buildings. Although the complex was previously protected by the council, the same entity authorized that the secondary buildings inside the block be demolished to make way for a parking lot, and that the interior of the main building undergo significant changes, with elements being demolished and others added, in order to transform the complex into a center for leisure, gastronomy, culture, commerce, and services. Another "revitalization" was attempted in the historic Dante Alighieri Square, which foresaw the removal of traditional elements, but generated controversy and ended up forbidden in court. The reform had also been approved by the council.

== Main constructions ==
Today there are few buildings left that were built in the traditional stone technique in the urban area, and none in the Historic Center; among the traditional wooden family houses, few survive in the city, and very few in the center. These typologies have been the subject of numerous academic studies for their architectural and urbanistic value because they are mostly creations of great originality and beauty; these types can be found in the Historic Center of Antônio Prado, a great national monument.

The buildings that can still be found in Antônio Prado are approximately what was seen in Caxias do Sul in its early days. However, in the beginning of the 20th century, differently from Antônio Prado, many elegant townhouses and palaces were built in Caxias, such as Eberle Palace, and the typical mixed residential and commercial buildings built in an Eclectic and Art Nouveau aesthetic, such as Sassi House and Scotti House. In the Art Deco period, imposing business buildings were built, such as the old Metallurgical Abramo Eberle, the old Auto Palácio, and the second Banrisul headquarters, which still survive with some late modifications. In the sacred typology, the city's most important monument - and the only one of its kind within the limits of the Historic Center - is the cathedral, a great example of Colonial Neo-Gothic inspired by Italian Gothic, austere on the outside and decorated internally with sophistication and wealth. The attached bell tower is a modern imitation of the style. Associated with the cathedral is the Canonical House, seat of the Bishopric, an Eclectic palace, which recently lost its original windows in an arbitrary renovation, even though it is protected property. Although several important examples remain, many others have been destroyed.

Among other architectural landmarks and notable places in the area are the Dante Alighieri Square, the Saldanha Bazaar and Bookstore, the Clube Juvenil headquarters, the Recreio da Juventude headquarters, the former French and Italian Bank for South America, the Municipal Museum of Caxias do Sul, and the former Central Cinema.

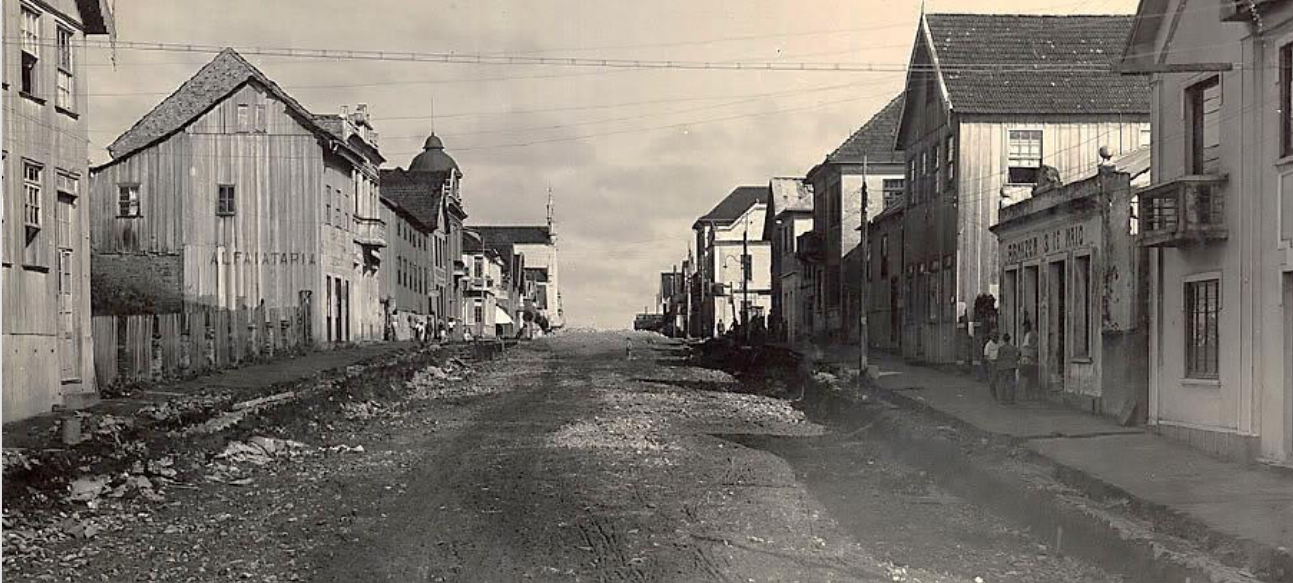
Sinimbu Street, near Dante Square, around 1935.

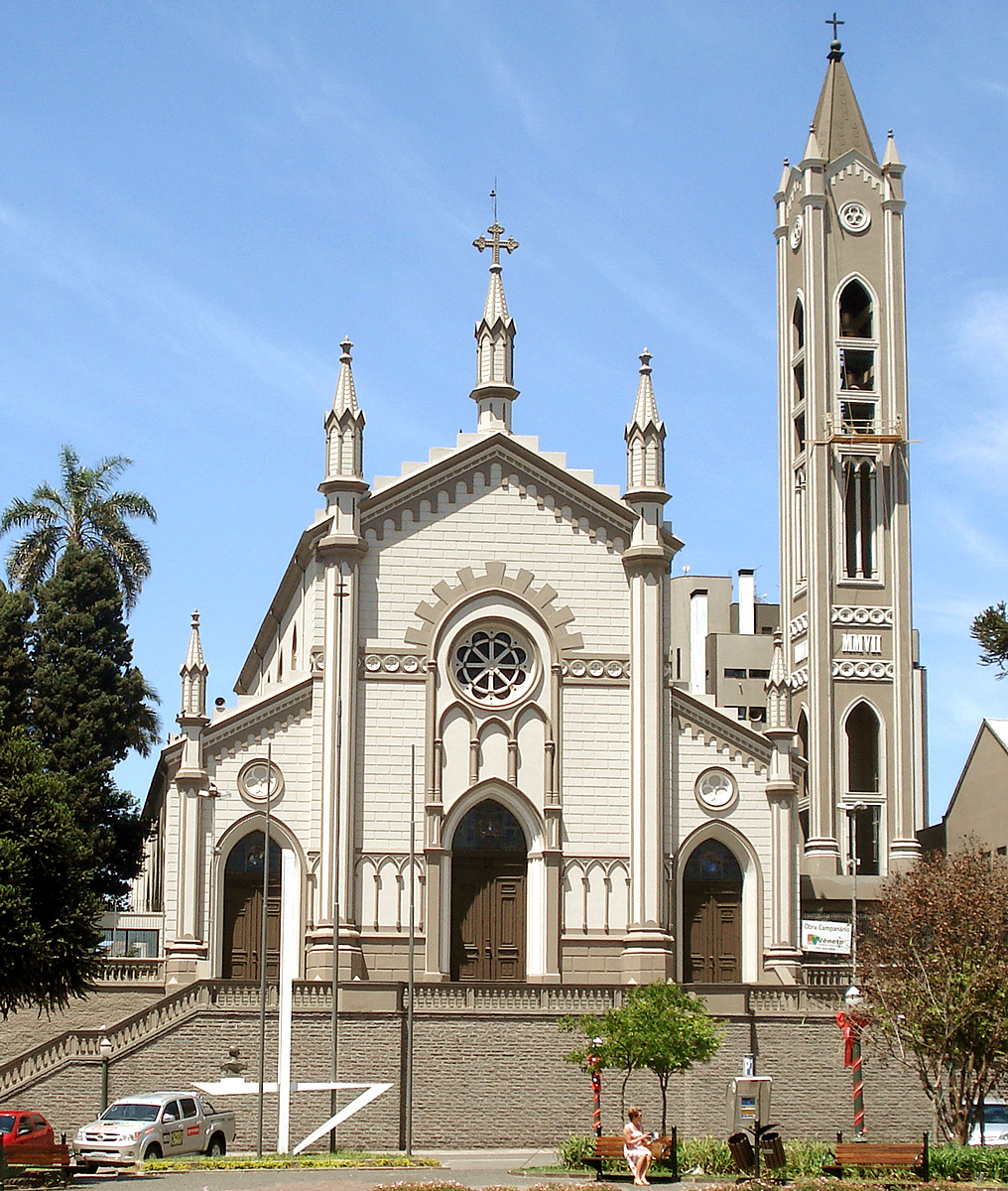
Cathedral.

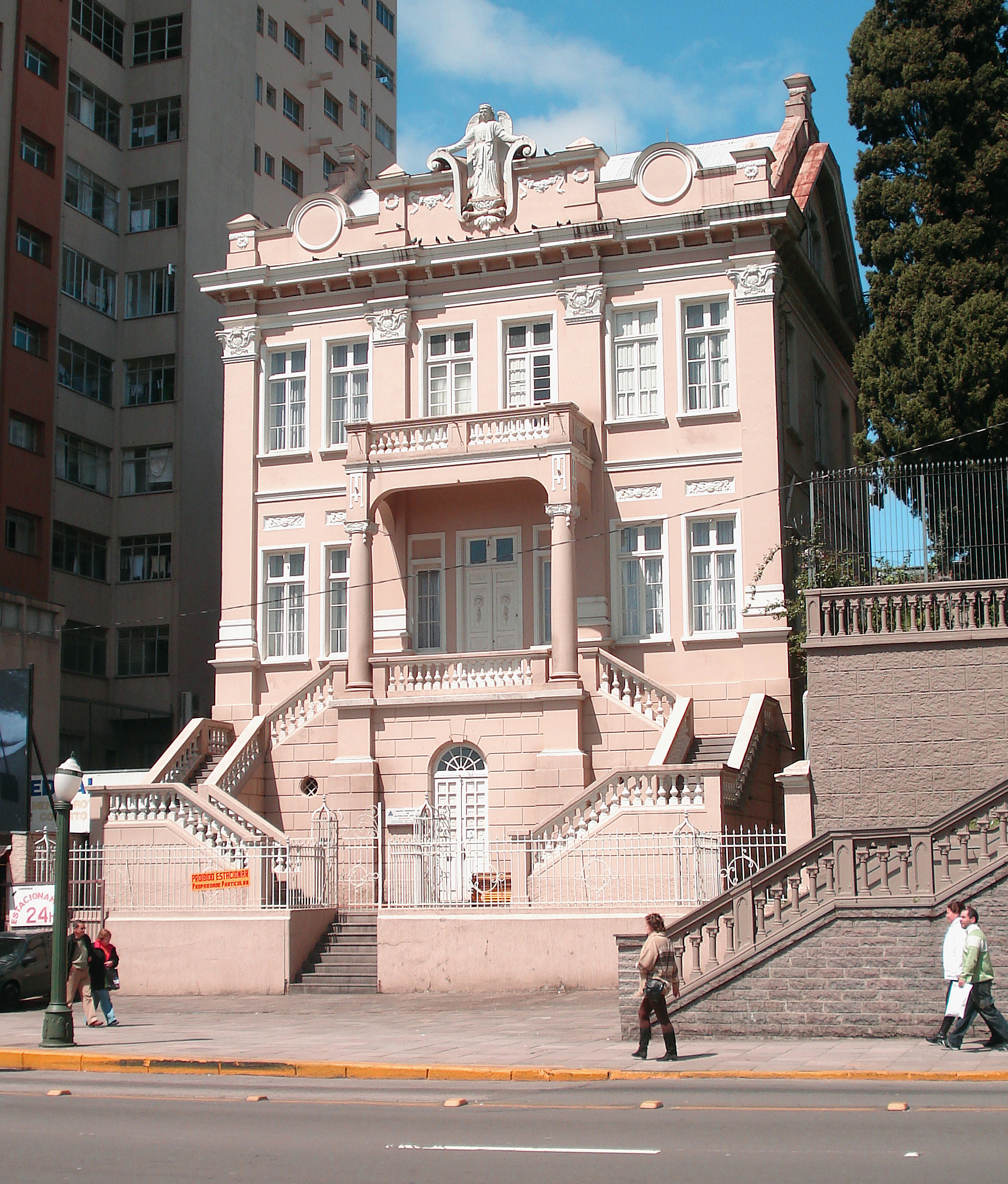
Canonical House.

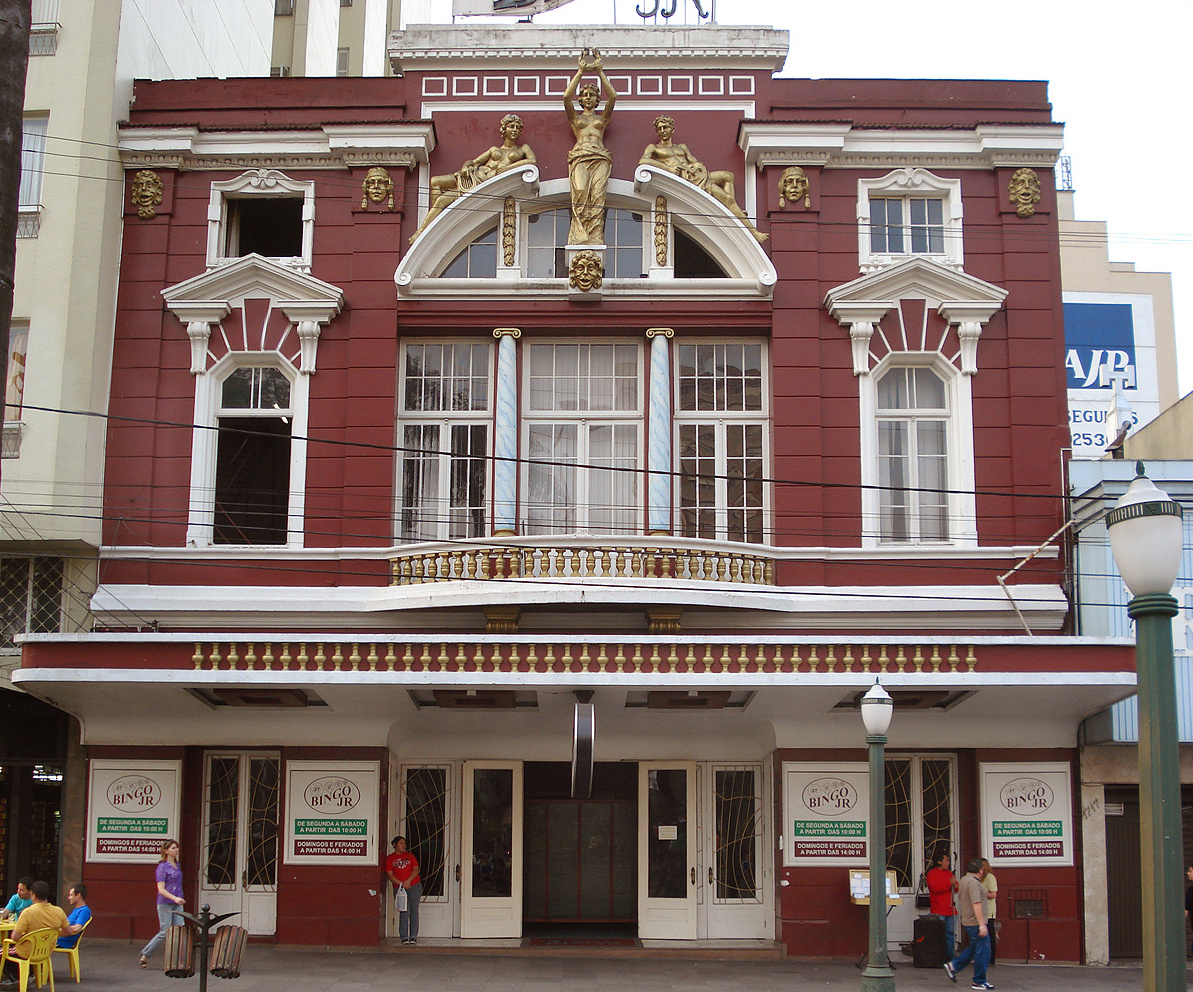
Former Central Cinema.

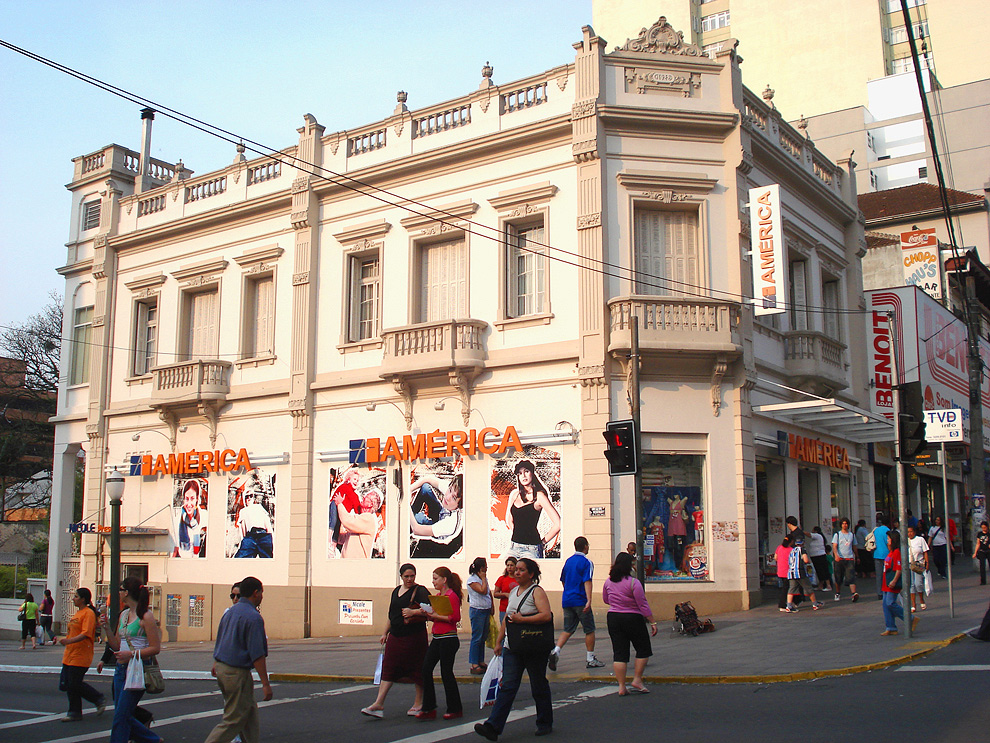
Sassi House.
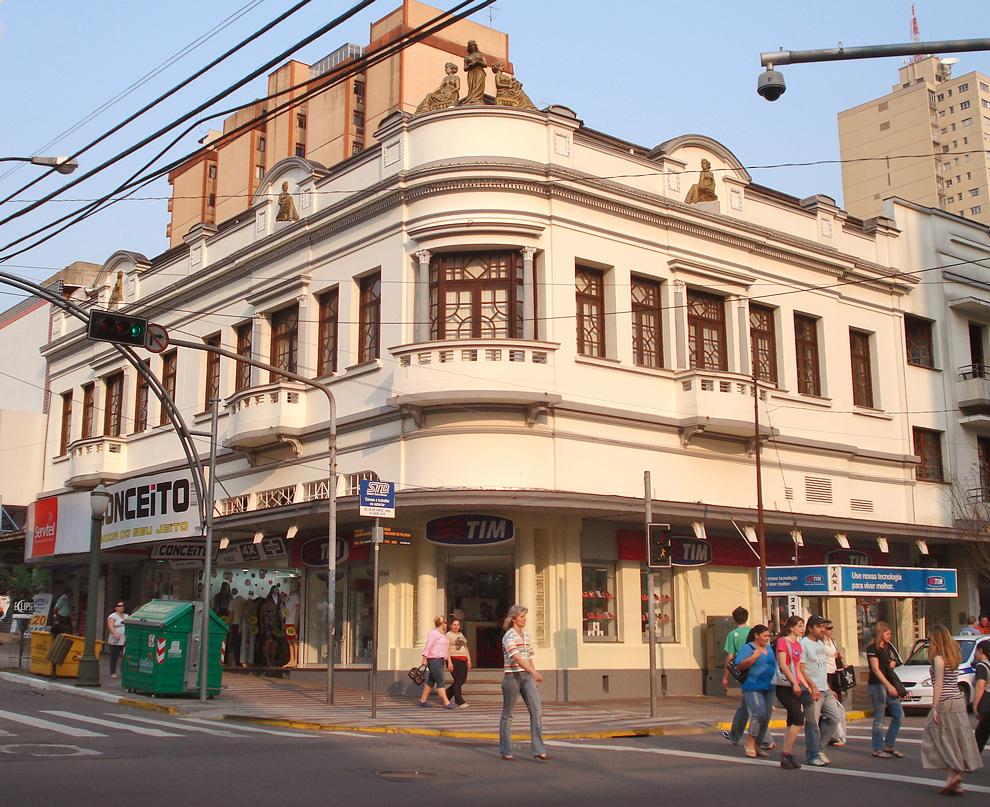
Saldanha Bookstore.

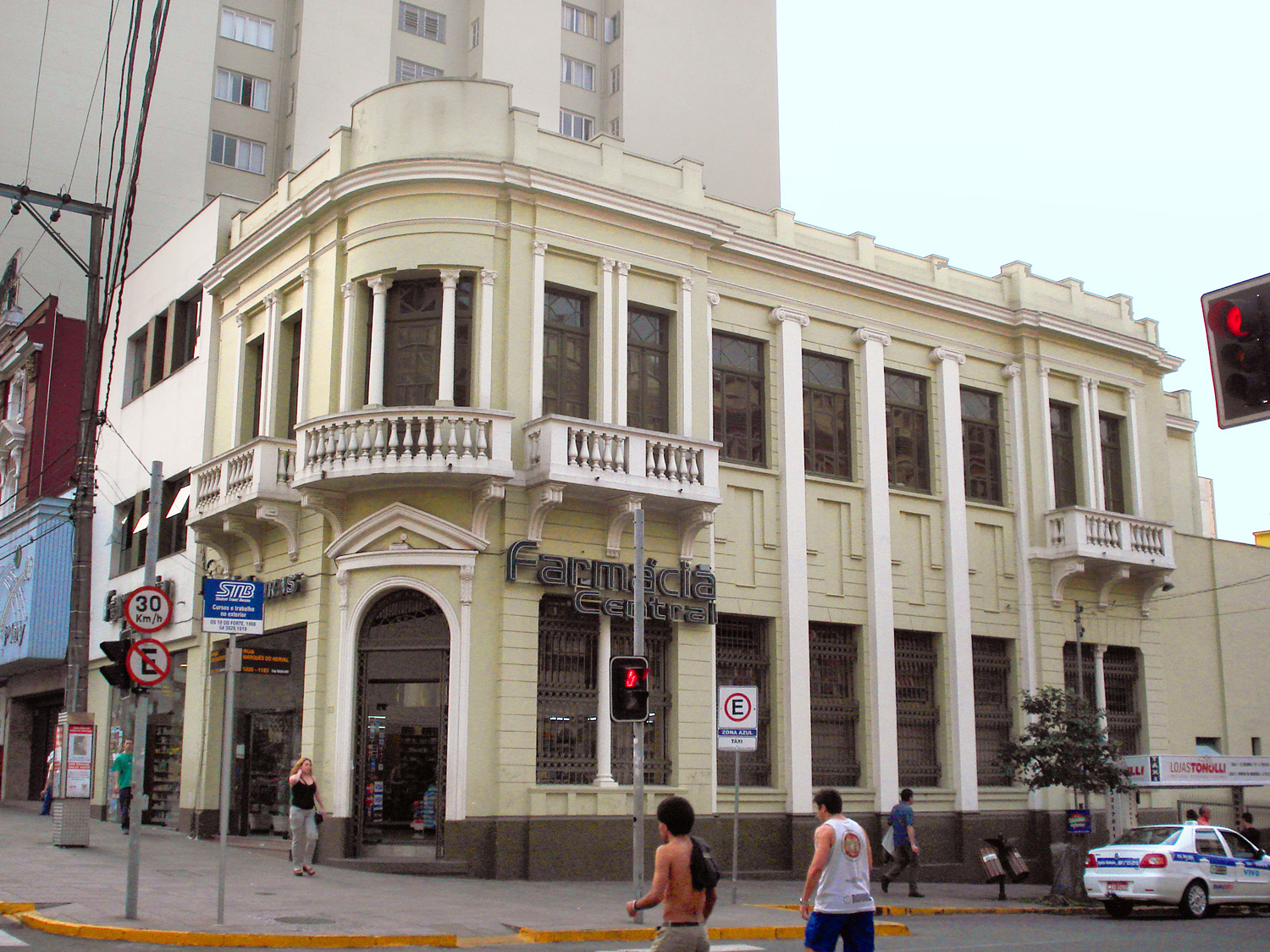
Scotti House.

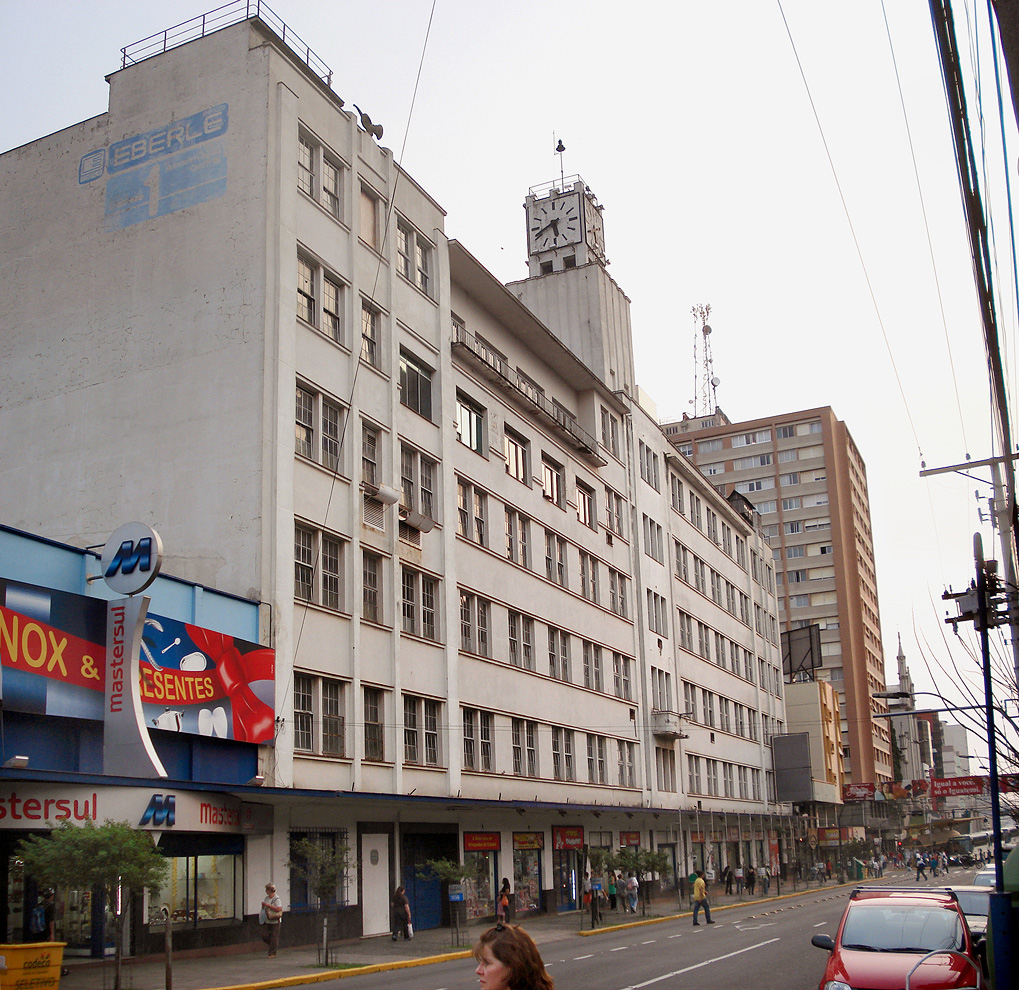
Former Metallurgical Abramo Eberle.

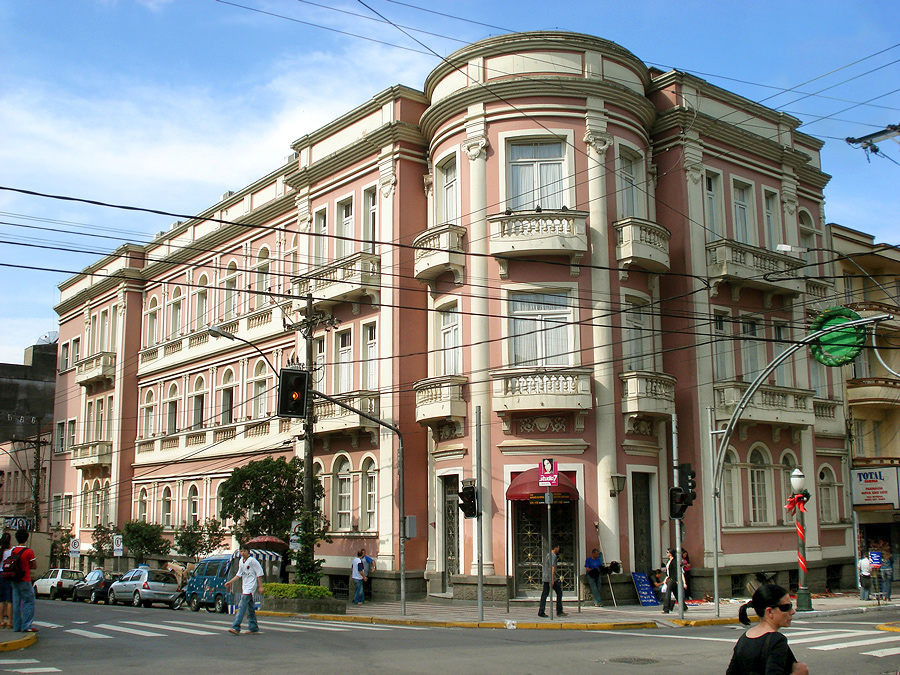
Clube Juvenil Headquarters.

== See also ==
- History of Caxias do Sul
- Nossa Senhora de Pompéia Hospital
