= Dante Alighieri Square =

Public square in Caxias do Sul, Brazil

Coordinates: 29.1683°S 51.1794°W

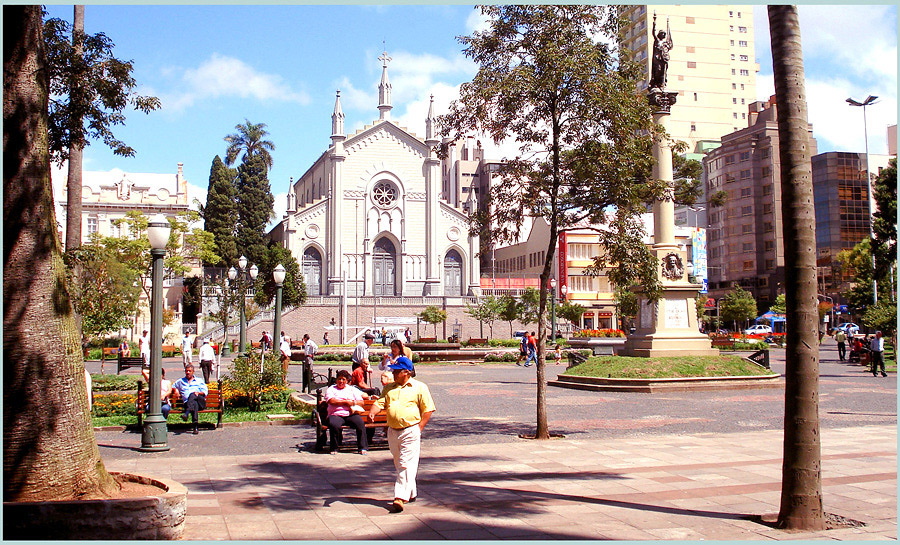
Partial view of Dante Alighieri Square, with the Cathedral in the background and the Statue of Liberty on the right.

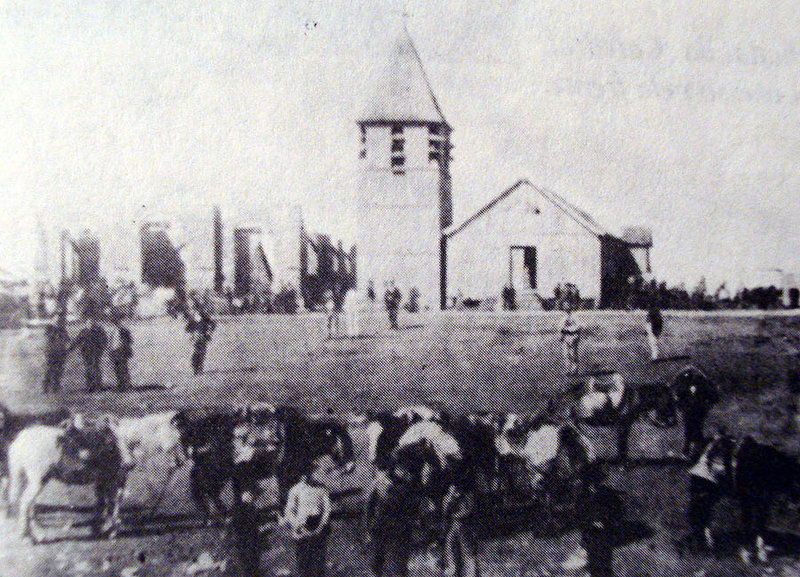
View of Dante Square at the end of the 19th century, with the first Mother Church.

Dante Alighieri Square is the oldest and most traditional public square in Caxias do Sul, Rio Grande do Sul, Brazil, located in the center of the city. It was included in the colony's floor plan from the beginning of the territory's occupation and was the stage for many important events, having in its surroundings several historical buildings of great importance.

== History ==
The creation of a square in Caxias do Sul had been planned since the foundation of the Italian colony, in 1875, in the same place where it is today. In its origin, its topography was different, being a much more elevated place than it is now. Until 1880, there are no reports of any improvements; the area was unpaved and the incipient urbanization in the surrounding area advanced over some of its stretches. These structures were removed in 1882 after a change in the urban land use plan was approved, which included the realignment of its delimiting streets.

Soon the urbanization work began, with the construction of some railings for fences and commercial buildings, hotels, and recreational houses in the surroundings, shaping what would be the current Historic Center of Caxias do Sul. Some kiosks were set up in the area of the square to sell drinks and different snacks, as well as, eventually, circuses and groceries, defining itself as a meeting and socializing place for the population.

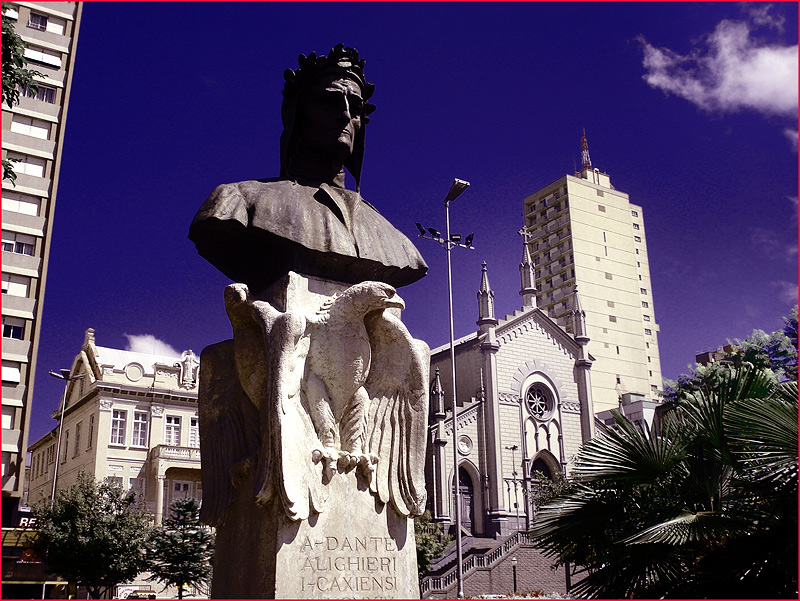
Monument to Dante Alighieri.

During the administration of José Pena de Moraes, plans were drawn up for improvements, and the level of the area was lowered after the removal of 1,200 m³ of rocks. The square was gardened, received benches and a fence, a retaining wall on the alignment of Júlio de Castilhos Street, the sidewalks were paved, and the monuments to Júlio de Castilhos, a work by Prosperi, and to Dante Alighieri, a work by the Italian Eugenio Bellotto, were installed. A bandstand was also erected for speeches by authorities and band performances.

In 1917, the square received the Municipal Chalet, a masonry replica of the traditional wooden kiosks, with a bar, restaurant, and game rooms. In 1922, on the centenary of Brazil's Independence, a monument to Liberty was inaugurated, containing a statue by Michelangelo Zambelli and a pedestal by Silvio Toigo. In 1927, more leveling and improvement work began, which lasted until 1940, and included new landscaping with a profusion of rose bushes, the construction of a fountain, and the paving of the alleys with stone mosaics. Meanwhile, on August 27, 1933, in front of the Cathedral, the cornerstone of the monument to the Duke of Caxias was laid.

During World War II, with the wave of xenophobia that spread through Brazil, the name of the square was changed to Rui Barbosa Square, after violent popular demonstrations. In the 1970s, a new fountain was installed and the square was enlarged, absorbing a stretch of Júlio de Castilhos Avenue, which was transformed into a sidewalk. In 1990, the government proposed rehabilitating the memory of Dante Alighieri, restoring the square's old name, which occurred on June 12. In the beginning of the 21st century, the stretch of sidewalk was again opened to vehicular traffic, and the place was completely re-paved.

== Conservation ==
Due to its antiquity, and for having been the stage of remarkable events in community life since the beginning of colonization, including hosting several of the first Grape Festivals, the square has become full of memories. However, these traditions are quickly being lost in the face of the fast-paced progress that the city is experiencing, as well as receiving a large new population from other regions.

Today, the square preserves a very similar configuration to the one established in the 1940s, but its surroundings, formed by historic buildings, suffered a profound loss of characteristics throughout the 20th century, losing notable constructions such as the old headquarters of the Banco Nacional do Comércio, the Pezzi Hotel, and the first headquarters of the Intendency. In the last decades, its remains have been further de-characterized by arbitrary renovations and by large advertising boards installed on the facades, which hide most of its elements.

However, the City Hall has developed some revitalization programs, such as Caminhos da Memória (English: Memory Paths), which include the square, as well as a legislation that protects buildings that are more than 50 years old. In addition, several properties in the surroundings have been listed as municipal heritage, legislation that minimizes the impacts of visual pollution on the buildings in the Historic Center has been implemented, and slowly, the population seems to be waking up to the importance of preserving the local patrimony, although there is still a lot of work to be done to prevent new disfigurement from occurring, as the ones that recently occurred in the cathedral and in the Canonical House, the two most relevant historic buildings that still survive in the surroundings, but that have not yet been listed as municipal heritage.

The square still preserves several plaques commemorating illustrious citizens of Caxias and important events, as well as the city's marco zero. Other significant buildings in the surroundings are the Scotti House, the Sassi House, and the headquarters of the Clube Juvenil.

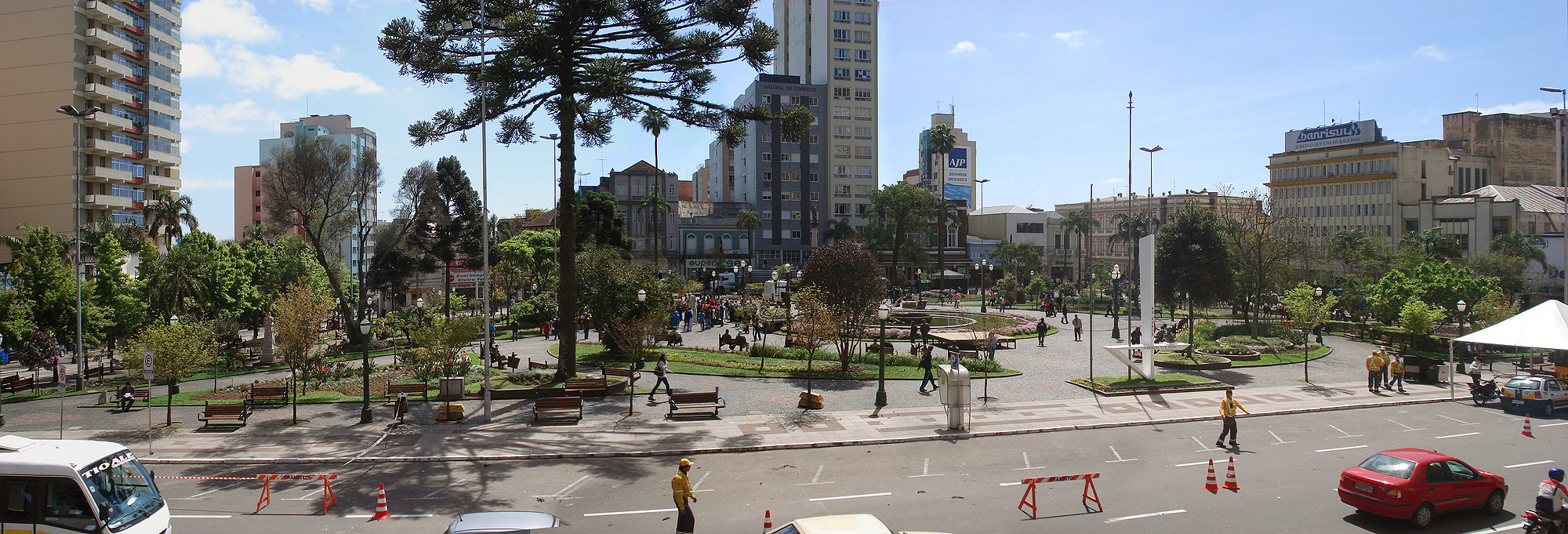
Panoramic view of the square from the Cathedral stairs.

== Gallery ==
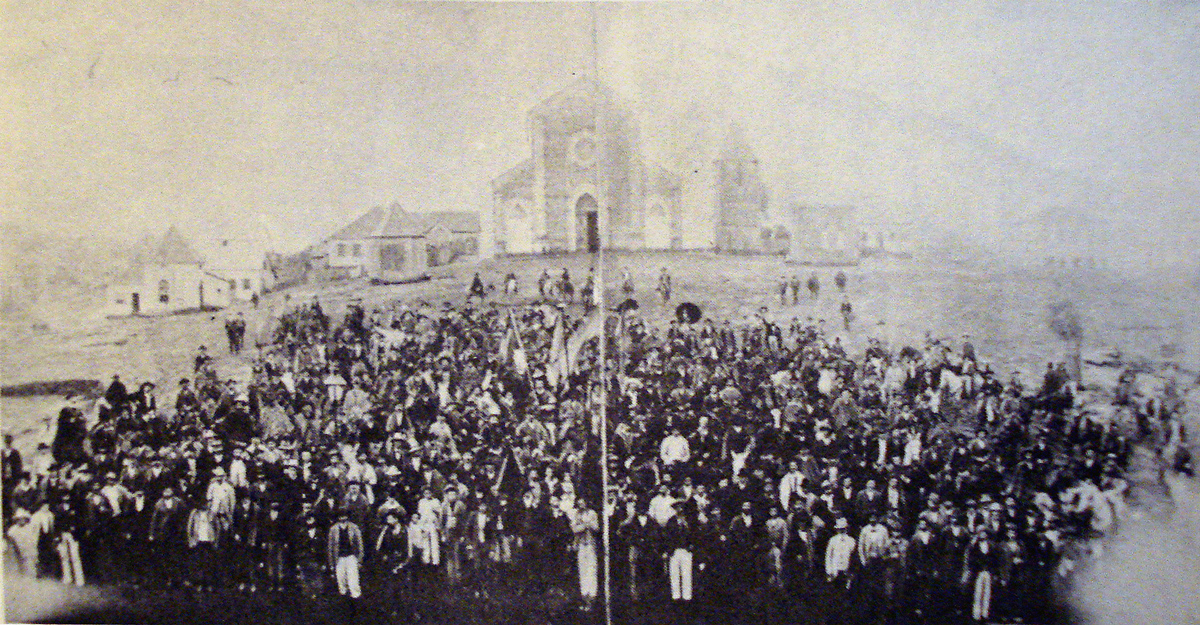
Election rally in 1902.

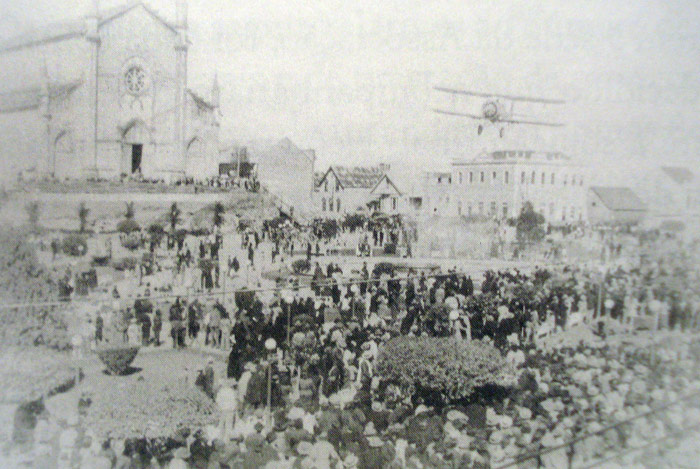
Pro-Estado Novo demonstrations in 1937.

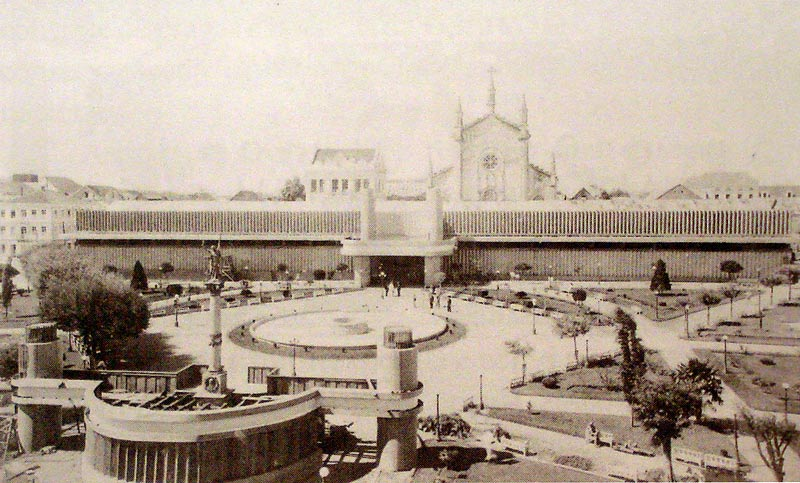
The Grape Festival pavilions set up in Dante Square in 1937.

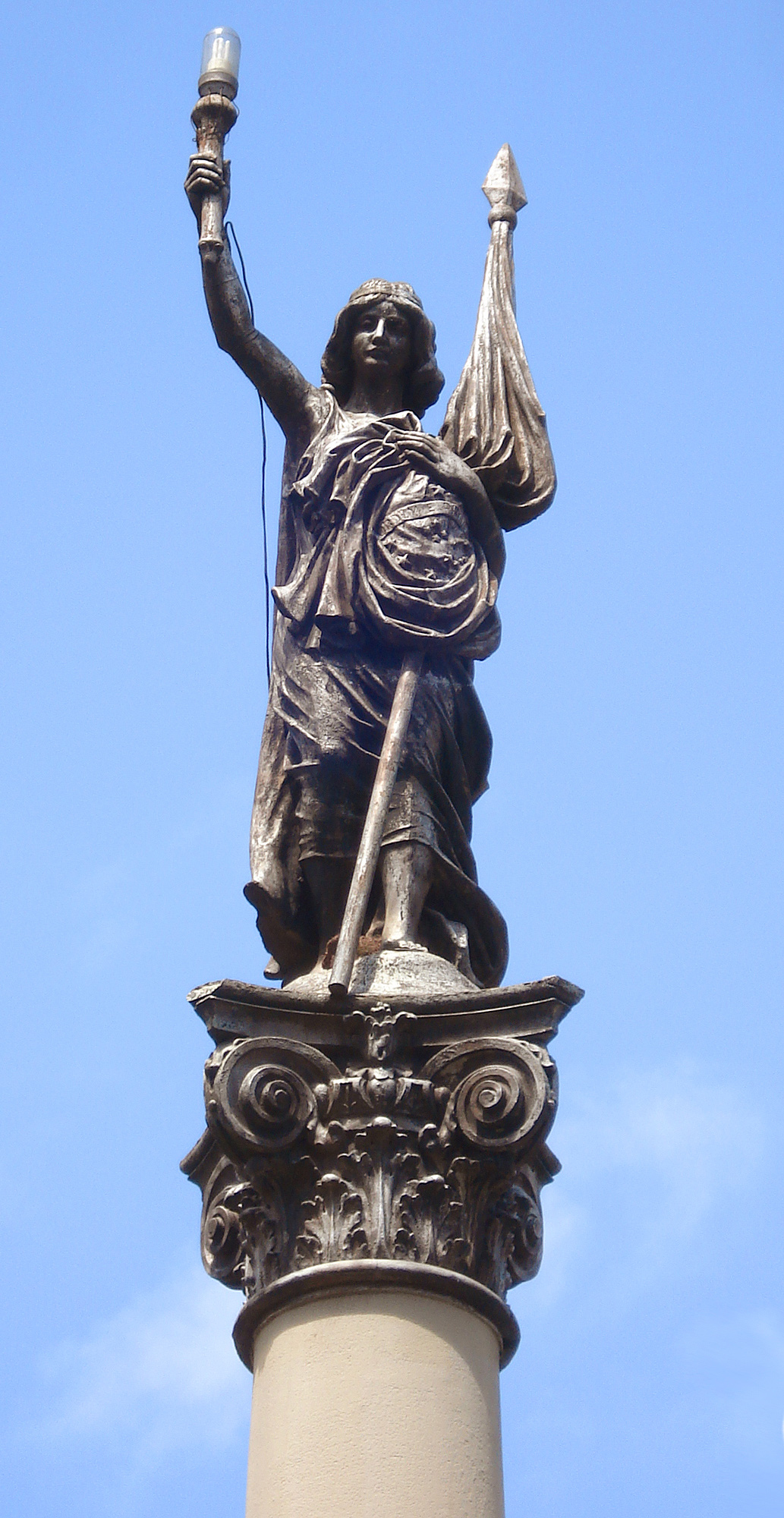
The Statue of Liberty, created by Michelangelo Zambelli.

== See also ==
- History of Caxias do Sul
- Historic Center of Caxias do Sul
