= Clube Juvenil headquarters =

Historic building in Caxias do Sul, Brazil

Coordinates: 29.1676°S 51.1785°W

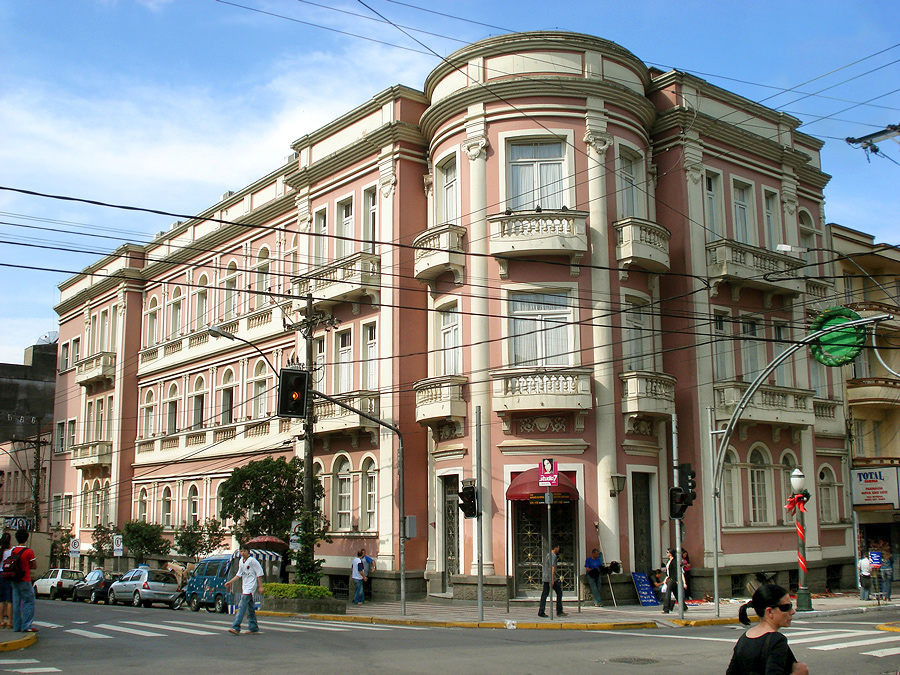
Clube Juvenil headquarters

The Clube Juvenil headquarters are located in the Brazilian city of Caxias do Sul, in the state of Rio Grande do Sul. It was built in 1928 and listed as a municipal heritage site in 2007.

== The club ==
Clube Juvenil is one of the most traditional recreational associations in Caxias do Sul. It was founded on June 19, 1905, by Carlos Giesen, Henrique Moro and Américo Ribeiro Mendes under the name Club Juvenil. The festive inauguration took place on July 23, 1905, and the first gala ball was held on December 31. The association's first headquarters were based in José Bragatti's townhouse.

In 1912, the first proper building was inaugurated. It consisted of a wooden and masonry house in Andrade Pinto Street, now Os 18 do Forte Street, which operated until 1924, when a fire destroyed it. Construction began on a new venue under the design of Silvio Toigo. Until the closing of the clubhouse in 2019, it regularly held cultural events for the local community, such as art exhibitions, concerts and literary soirees, besides its exclusive social and recreational activities for members.

== Historic building ==
The building was designed by Silvio Toigo and inaugurated on September 8, 1928, with two floors and a basement. The third floor was built between 1962 and 1965. In 1990, the exterior of the building was restored and painted. In 2001, the Intermediate Hall underwent renovations to restore the space. Known as the Golden Hall, its location on the second floor offers access to the Hall of Honor, which features a gallery of photos of the club's founders and presidents, and the Queens' Gallery. The interior contains several rooms and halls reserved for various uses. The basement housed a restaurant, the collection rooms and the Pelourinho nightclub. On the first floor, there was a bombonière, a secretariat and rooms for recreational games. On the upper floors, there were two large party rooms, one seating 200 people and the other 400. On December 12, 2007, the historic building was listed as a landmark site by the Caxias do Sul City Hall.

In 2019, the building was closed to the public and its activities were suspended. The restaurant was closed and the building was put up for rent in 2021. The administration claimed to be unable to afford the maintenance of the building and hoped that the rental income would help solve the problems.

== See also ==
- History of Caxias do Sul
- Historic Center of Caxias do Sul
