= Salvador Sartori =

Italian-Brazilian politician and merchant

Salvatore Sartori
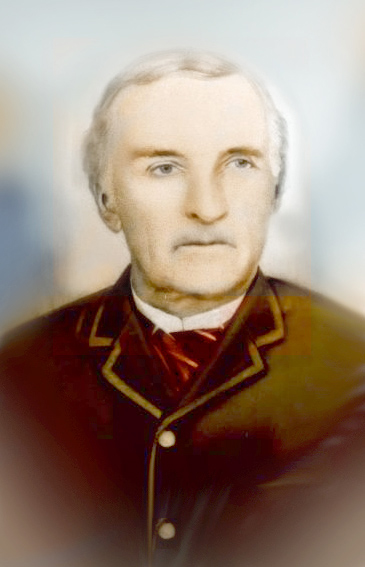
- Born: 1827; Vicenza; Italy
- Died: 1899 (aged 71–72); Caxias do Sul, Rio Grande do Sul; Brazil
- Occupations: Politician and merchant

Salvatore Sartori, known in Brazil as Salvador Sartori (Vicenza, October 20, 1827 - Caxias do Sul, July 8, 1899) was an Italian politician and merchant who became a naturalized Brazilian.

After a successful career as a road contractor in Italy, he got into difficulties and decided to emigrate to Brazil. He was one of the founders of Caxias do Sul, made his fortune in commerce, was a Catholic leader, and became an influential politician. He was one of the founders of the directory of the Riograndense Republican Party, was nominated by the state government to be part of the first Governmental Board during the emancipation of the municipality, and later was elected to the first Municipal Council, participating in the elaboration of fundamental laws for the organization of the community. He gained prominence in local society and gave birth to a prolific line of descendants, with several notorious members.

== Family & Past in Italy ==
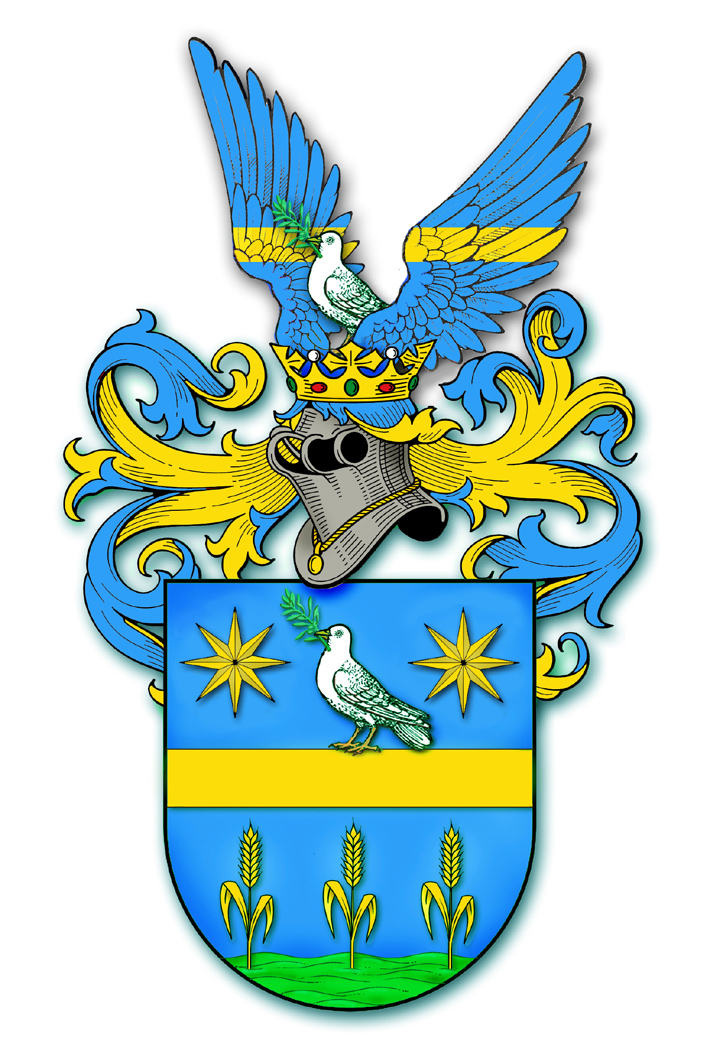
One of the coat of arms of the Sartori family of Vicenza.

Salvador Sartori, son of Angelo Sartori and Giacomina Toffolon, was born in Vicenza. His family line has long antiquity and was founded by members of the retinue of the Florentine bishop Andrea dei Mozzi. After being involved in a scandal that made Dante Alighieri put him in the Inferno of his Divine Comedy, but which today is the object of skepticism, the bishop was transferred to the vacant see of Vicenza in 1295. He was accompanied by a court of which the Sartori were a part, a group that received fief in the commune of Roana, one of the Seven Communes of the Vicentine plateau, and joined the nobility of Vicenza as vassals of successive local bishops.

By 1500, the family had already acquired prominence and large holdings in the region, and had been added to the patriciate, the civic nobility of Vicenza. From the core of the Seven Communes and Vicenza, the Sartori produced vast descendants, joining the patriciate of several Veneto communes, and giving many notable members. However, in the 17th century, the civic statutes of the commune of Vicenza were reformed, excluding families practicing mechanical trades such as commerce from the patriciate. The lumber trade was the main source of income for the Sartori, and since then, they are no longer mentioned as nobles in this commune.

Not much is known about Salvador Sartori's life before he arrived in Brazil, and even there his story is poorly documented. The press was still incipient in the city, and the documentation of the City Council, of which he was a part, precisely the one referring to the period in which he was active, was mostly lost in a fire.

His family left Vicenza when Sartori was still young, possibly because of the political, social, and military unrest of that time. From the Napoleonic invasion in 1797, the commune spent a long period afflicted by war, popular revolts, and tyrannical governments. By 1832, the family was already established in the commune of Cornuda, province of Treviso. In 1854, Sartori married Angela Zancaner, who would give him eleven children: Ludovico, Lino, Amalia, Carolina, Maria, Luigi, Alberto, Massimo, Guerino, Settimo, and Attilio, who was born in Brazil. According to memories preserved by his great-grandson Ludovico Beretta Sartori, Salvador was a partner in a contractor specializing in road construction, but for some reason, his partner in the business came into conflict with the Cornuda authorities, damaging his interests. Faced with an adverse situation and seduced by a misleading propaganda of the Italian colonization agents in Brazil, who promised him great facilities in the New World, he sold all his assets and investments, which were still significant, and decided to seek a new life in America.

== Life in Brazil ==
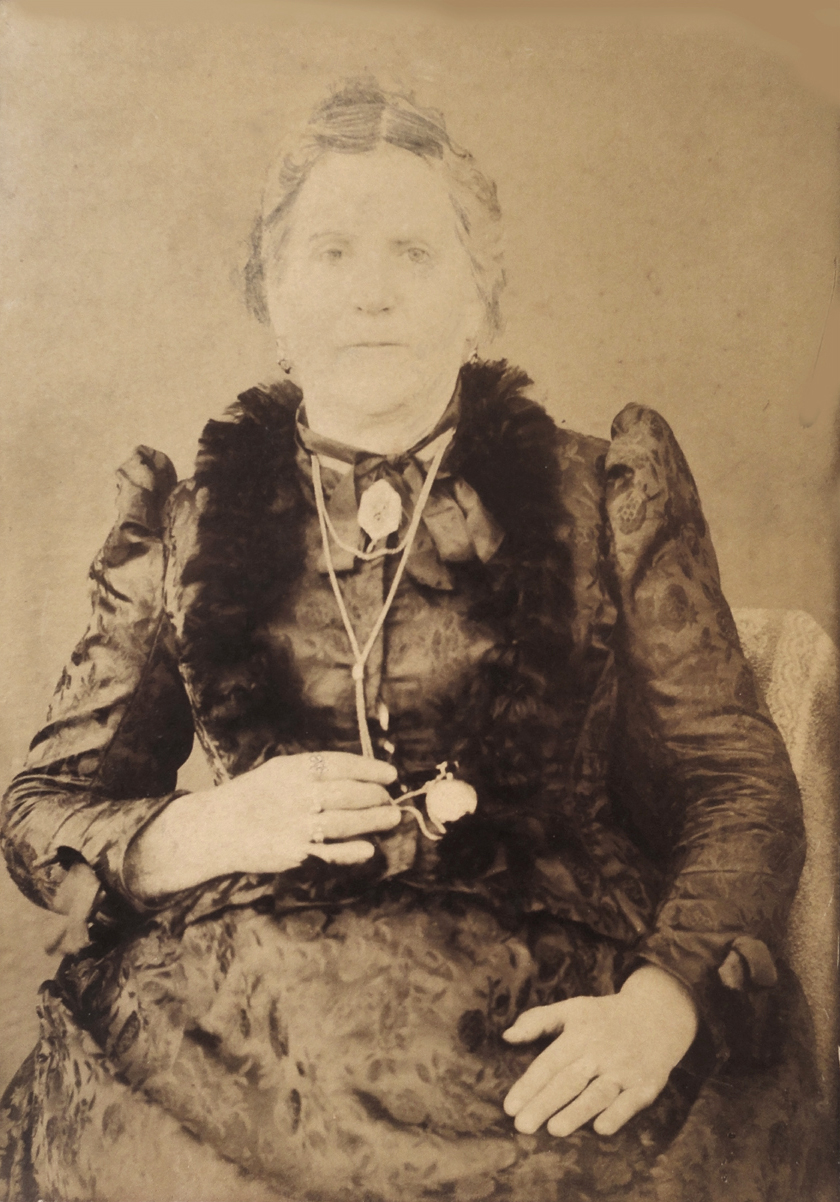
Angela Zancaner, Sartori's wife.

Salvador arrived in Caxias do Sul on February 20, 1879, during the great immigration wave at the end of the 19th century, taking part in the founding work of the city. When he arrived, there were no more lots available in the urban center, so he first settled in Travessão Umberto I da Sexta Légua, along with other family members. However, with the resources Salvador brought with him, in a few years he set up a large business in the Dante Alighieri square, the center of the emerging settlement, where he started to live. By 1883 he is already cited as the owner of a "business" and a bakery.

At the time of the foundation, when everything was improvised, the merchants, formerly called "traders", carried out several activities more diverse than simply buying and selling, including transport, savings and credit operations, functioning as incipient banking houses, besides often maintaining associated manufactures and industries; they could even have guest rooms in their establishments and set up bodegas and restaurants. From 1892 on, he was listed in the Industry and Professions Tax Registration Books as also owning a bodega and a butcher shop, and shortly afterwards he appears to own a tannery. There are also reports that he made shoes, kept a troop of mules to transport goods for himself and others between Caxias and the trading post of São Sebastião do Caí - from where they were shipped to the capital Porto Alegre -, and was apparently a wine producer. The article by his granddaughter Graciema Paternoster, published in the Pioneiro newspaper, illustrates the profile of this business at the beginning of the 20th century, when it had already been inherited by Sartori's children: "My aunt and uncle Sartori's house was everything. Because it was coffee there, it had a coffee hall with the billiard room, hall for playing cards, drinking, it had farms, with all the quality of a farm. Then it had a very big display case, it looks like you can see it now, a display case that you pushed back and forth, full of silk scarves that you used to put on your head, those necklaces..."

According to Costamilan, "forged in the crucible of daily struggle, he soon saw his name accepted within the community", becoming a leader in religion and politics. He was co-founder of the first Chapel of San Pellegrino that, in the 1940s, gave place to a monumental church, a member of the construction commission of the first Mother Church, and one of the founders and first leaders of the directory of the Riograndense Republican Party. After the former Caxias colony was emancipated to the condition of an autonomous municipality, on June 28, 1890, he was nominated by the State Government as a member of the Governmental Board, taking office on July 2 along with Angelo Chittolina and Ernesto Marsiaj.

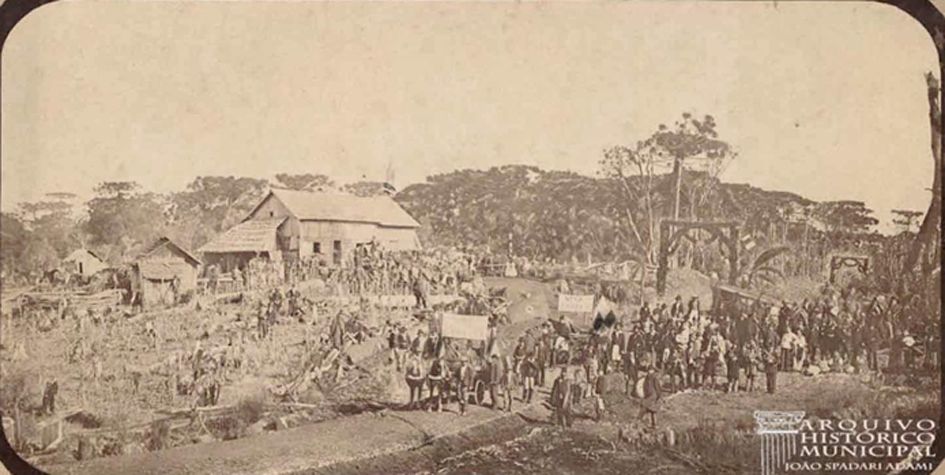
Official committee arriving from Porto Alegre, the state capital, for the installation of the Governmental Board of Caxias do Sul in 1890. João Spadari Adami Municipal Historical Archive.

Some transcriptions made by Adami of lost documentation allow us to know from the inside a little of Sartori's participation in public administration in those times when everything was to be done, showing the rulers interested in a variety of subjects. As an example, here follows one of the first letters issued by the Board, number 8:

Citizen.

At this time all the annual taxes that are easily collected have already been collected by the Municipal Government of São Sebastião do Caí, throughout this new municipality; however, this Government lacks the prompt and precise importance of repairing the Municipal Palace and attending to the most urgent repairs that several streets and the General Road, almost impassable, require. It could resort to credit or to collecting the taxes and fines due, but it is repugnant to it to begin its functions by vexing its fellow citizens, even though it does so in the fulfillment of a duty. So, it decides to ask for your approval for the resolution it has taken to exempt from that fine everyone who, within 30 days from today, voluntarily satisfies their debts. And since this deadline cannot be used by the residents of the outskirts of the municipality, the same administration wishes to extend it for another 30 days, and asks you to do so.

Health and Fraternity.

Municipal Government of Caxias, July 3, 1890.

To the citizen General of Division Cândido Costa, honorable Governor of the State.

Signed by Ernesto Marsiaj, Angelo Chittolina, Salvador Sartori.

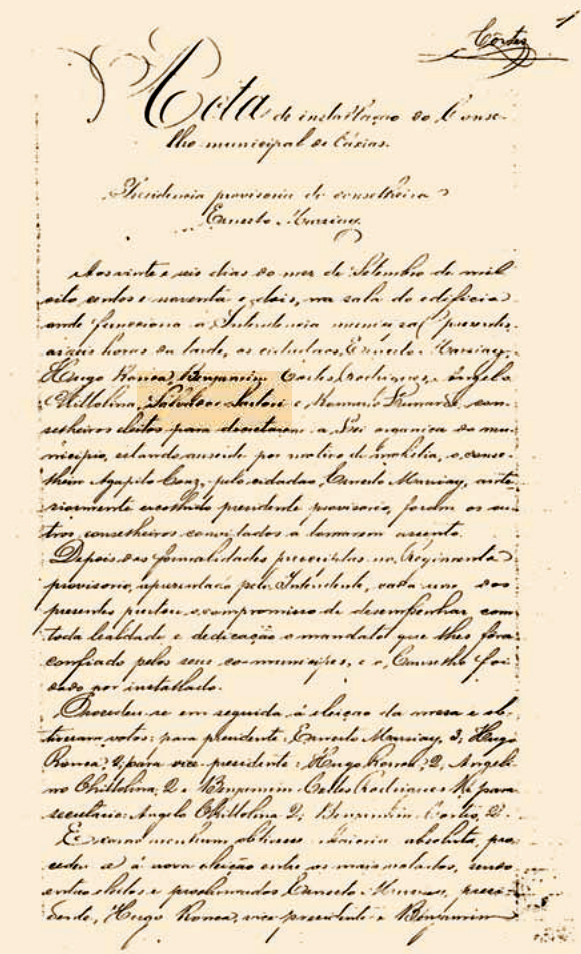
First page of the minutes of the installation of the Municipal Council of Caxias do Sul on September 26, 1892. City Council archives. Sartori's name is highlighted.

Sartori's signature on the manuscript of the Code of Ordinances, October 12, 1892.

This letter already points out one of the main problems faced by the newly installed government. As soon as the emancipation of the town of Caxias took place, the new municipality found itself completely deprived of funds, and the solution found was the immediate collection of the taxes due and the late fines. This displeased the population, since most settlers took time to stabilize their economic situation, leading many of them to end up losing their land due to their inability to fulfill their legal obligations. The situation remained complicated for several years, since, at that time, the authorities of the Land Commission, an organ of the imperial government that organized the colonizing process of the municipality of São Sebastião do Caí, of which the Caxias colony was part as a district before gaining independence, and of the village itself, still overlapped their attributions confusingly; in practice, the settlers started paying double taxes. As a result, serious friction arose between the public authorities and the settlers, which, added to other political disputes that simmered, derived from rivalries between Masons and Catholics and others that the immigrants had brought from Italy, convulsed by a difficult unification process, contributed to disrupt everyone's lives and made the actions of the Board and the Council often conflictive, if not impossible.

Another illustrative letter is No. 19, also in Adami's transcript:

Citizen.

In a municipality as vast as this one, and so distant from the center, inhabited mostly by poor farmers, as you've seen, a single pharmacy is an evil: it's authorizing the monopoly, it's putting the citizen in the alternative of using medicines manipulated by someone who doesn't deserve his trust, and paying for them ten times their value, or seeing the sick person who is dear to him die for lack of medicinal resources.

The skillful pharmacist Hugo Ronca, who enjoys general and entire confidence, has twice applied to the General Inspectorate of Hygiene for a license to open a pharmacy in this municipality and was denied on the pretext that there is already a licensee there; but if this licensee does not satisfy those in need of medicinal resources, who will they turn to?

This Intendency, in the sole interest of its citizens, is concerned with the matter and is asking for your interference so that this license may be granted.

Health and Fraternity.

Municipal Government of Caxias, September 20, 1890.

To the citizen General of Division Cândido Costa, honorable Governor of the State.

Signed by Ernesto Marsiaj, Angelo Chittolina, Salvador Sartori.

On February 13, 1891, Salvador asked to be relieved of his duties on the Board, and on October 20 of the same year, he was elected to the first City Council, taking office on December 15 and remaining in office until September 1896. However, political unrest continued, and on June 25, 1892, the second Revolt of the Settlers broke out, which deposed the council and took over the command of the municipality. On July 5, after intervention by the State Government, the Council reassumed control, but it was not until September 26 that the solemn and definitive reinstallation took place.

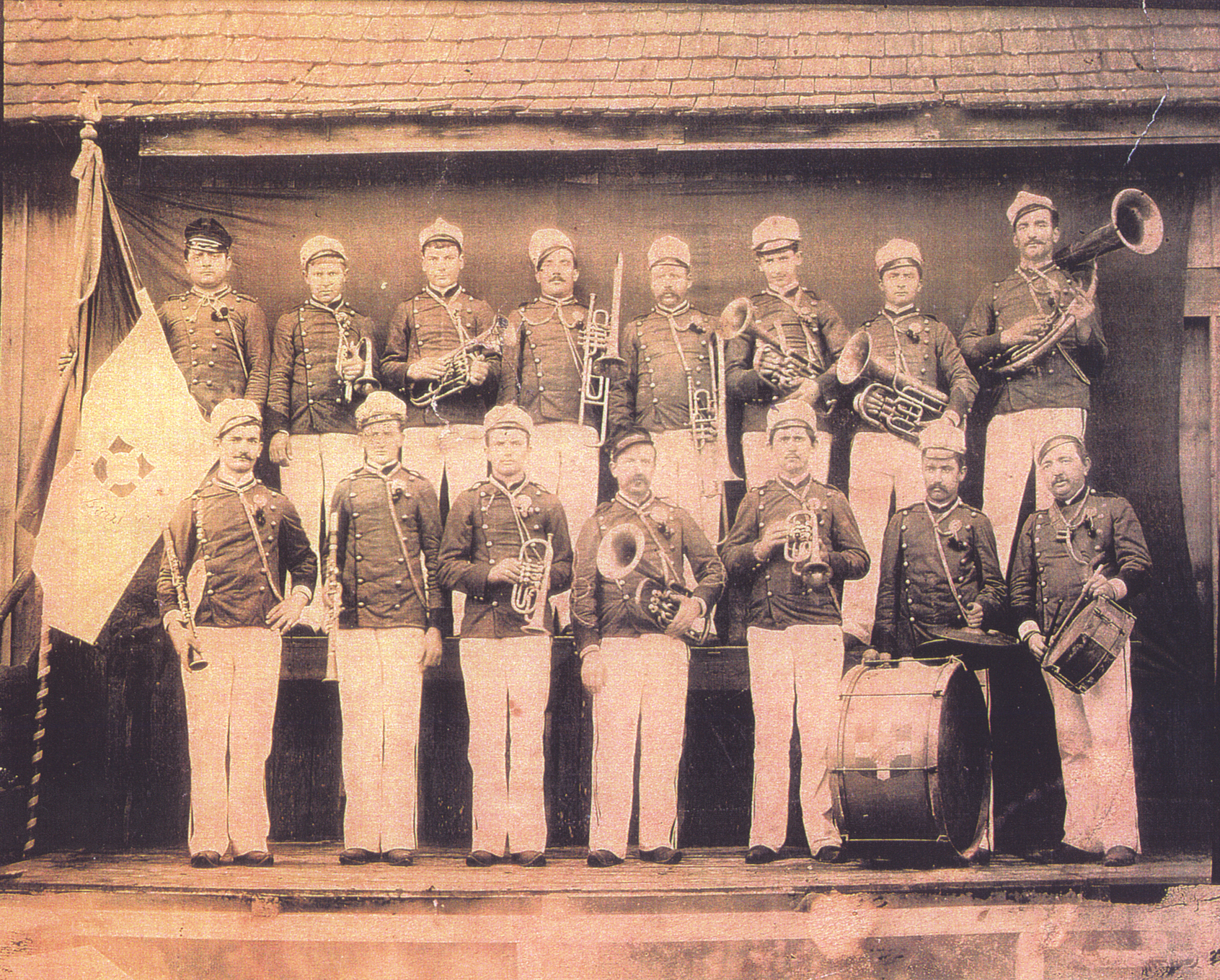
The Italian-Brazilian Band. There are five sons of Sartori in the group: Settimo, Massimo, Alberto, Guerino and Atilio Sartori.

The council was in charge of discussing the budget; economic policy; control of the municipality's assets; the creation, increase or suppression of taxes, and authorization for loans and credit operations, among other attributions. As a councilor, Sartori participated in the approval of three important laws that organized the municipality and the functioning of the Executive and Legislative branches: the Internal Regulation, approved on October 4, 1892, the Organic Law, on October 12, 1892, and the Code of Ordinances, on March 5, 1893. The Internal Regulation disciplined the functioning of the Legislature and established a code of ethics for the exercise of public office. The Organic Law formalized the existence of the Municipality, creating the instruments for the execution of the responsibilities foreseen for the cities in the 1891 Constitution, fixing the attributions of the occupants of public positions, besides regulating the services and responsibilities of the municipal administration. The Code of Ordinances gathered the norms in all fields of action of the public power, with the objective of regulating people's behavior and the use of urban space, for the maintenance of public order and the promotion of progress and social welfare. He also participated in several other debates that led to the approval of laws on a variety of subjects, among them the Urban Decimal Law (1893), that created a tax on buildings, the increase of funds for the Municipal Guard (1895), and the allocation of 800 thousand réis for the works of the Rio Branco Road between Caxias and São Sebastião do Caí (1895). Particularly important was the Electoral Law (1894), which organized the entire electoral process in the municipality, defining the districts and sections, the rules for the registration of voters, the eligibility criteria, stipulating the creation of registration commissions and a general commission, and establishing all the procedures for holding elections.

Costamilan gives other information about Sartori:

He was a somewhat reserved man, iron willed, balanced in his judgments and in his way of being. His figure was impressive and commanded respect, but deep down he was an understanding, soft-spoken father, an uncompromising defender of the religion he professed and of the principles of his formation. This is why it seems strange, at first sight, to link him to the eccentric behavior of his adult children, who were all cheerful, talkative, braggarts, and noisy, true artists of the stage art and certainly responsible for their father's white hair. All were accomplished singers and musicians, and five of them became, around 1893, full members of the historic Italian-Brazilian Band, [...] which for that reason came to be known as La Musica dei Sartori. But not to be out of line with an old saying, the circumspect father had a beautiful tenor voice, and besides doing choir with his sons, [...] he brightened up many religious festivals and concerts in old Caxias. Anyway, nobody could be sad around those people, because everything they did or said was a laughing matter; the boys' greatest hobby, whenever they had the opportunity, was to play tricks on their friends, and an encyclopedia could be written, if someone was willing, about the antics of that bunch of histrionics.

=== The Nosadini Case ===
Towards the end of his life, Sartori became involved in further friction, triggered by the arrival of the ultramontanist priest Pietro Nosadini, appointed to govern the parish of the Mother Church. In a short time, Nosadini gathered around himself the Catholic community and incited opposition to the Masons and liberals, as well as to the government, accusing them of being responsible for the situation of stagnation and confusion in which the village was found. Sartori, a fervent Catholic, soon became a close friend of Nosadini's and was part of a committee organized by the priest, which brought together the city's main Catholic leaders, although there is no sign that he shared his exacerbated radicalism. The atmosphere became tense and volatile, with accusations and insults multiplying between the priest and his main opponent, the intendant José Cândido de Campos Júnior, who was Grand Master of the Masonic store Força e Fraternidade, and violence again occurred. The priest suffered an attack in 1897 by a gang of heavily armed hooded men, under the eyes of the population, who almost took his life, being very badly wounded. In 1898, Campos also claimed to have suffered an attack, which, however, according to Costamilan, must have been a staging, since there were no witnesses and the intendant did not suffer any damage. In any case, Campos accused the priest and his friends Salvador Sartori and Ambrosio Bonalume (Sartori's son-in-law) as the instigators. The accusation was vehemently refuted and does not seem to have received credit in the community. The situation only softened with the removal of the priest from Caxias by Bishop Cláudio Ponce de Leão.

== Legacy ==
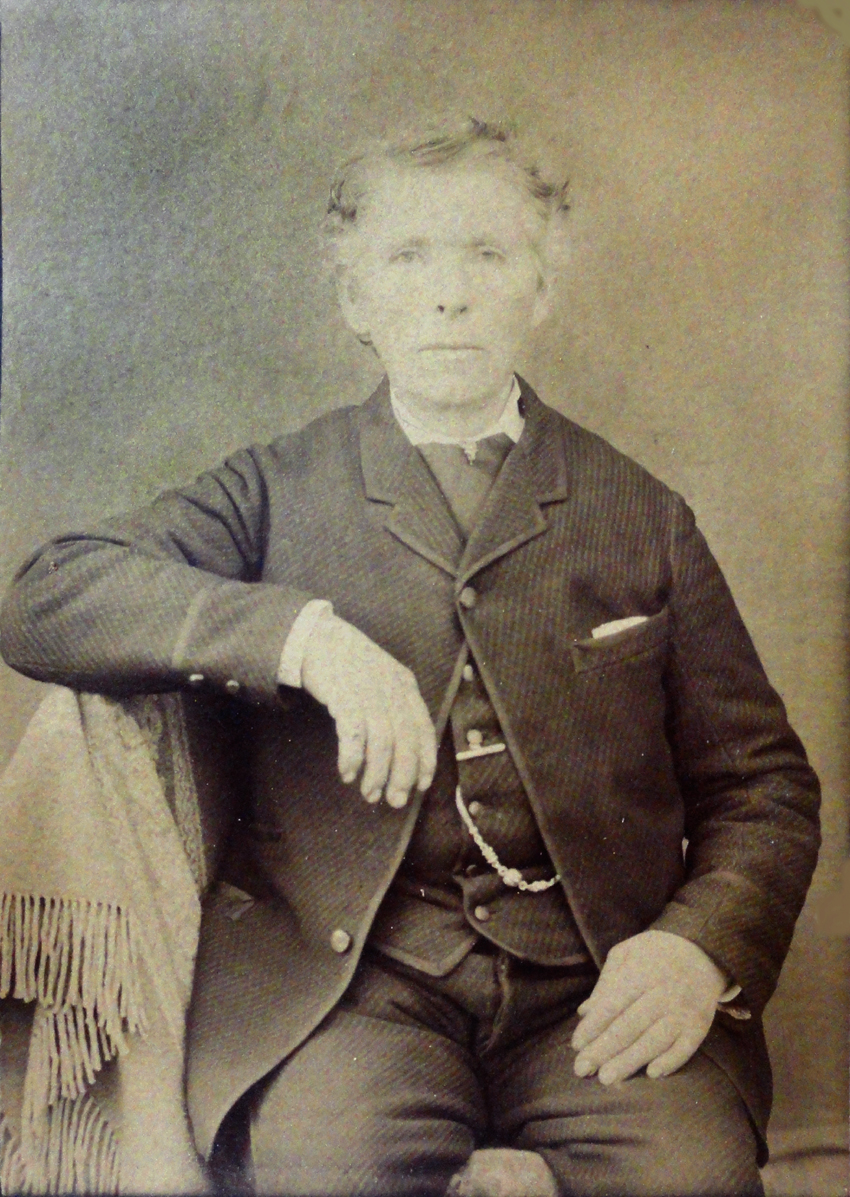
Sartori in his last years.

Sartori was outstanding in many aspects of social, political, and religious life, and was one of the most influential public figures of Caxias do Sul in his time. In 1925, his name was inscribed as one of the founders of the city in a Golden Book created by the Municipality. In the same year, in a large album published by the State Government in partnership with the Italian Government commemorating the 50 years of Italian immigration to Rio Grande do Sul, he was again celebrated as "one of the exponents of the foundation of Caxias," highlighting also his family, "egregiously linked to domestic affections and traditions and to the economic cooperation that is at the origins of the Pearl of the Colonies and contributes to create a history of amazing progress".

He was praised by several distinguished personalities of the city as a firm leader in the times of social, political, and military unrest at the end of the century, amidst the difficulties of settling the colony, the turmoil of the Federalist Revolution, and the settler revolts that marked the early history of Caxias do Sul. He was an honorable man and servant of the public cause, a patriot, one of the founders and one of the first organizers of the city, and today he baptizes a street. Mário Gardelin, one of the main local historians, in the second edition of his monumental Povoadores da Colônia Caxias (2002), written in partnership with Rovílio Costa, described him as "a personality of great importance in the life of Caxias", and regretted that such an illustrious figure has not yet been biographed. In the same year, during the solemn session that celebrated the 110th anniversary of the installation of the Legislative Power in Caxias do Sul, with the presence of a great number of authorities, a plaque reproducing the minutes of the installation of the first Council was unveiled at the City Hall, where his name and the names of the other first councilors of the city are inscribed.

== Descendants ==
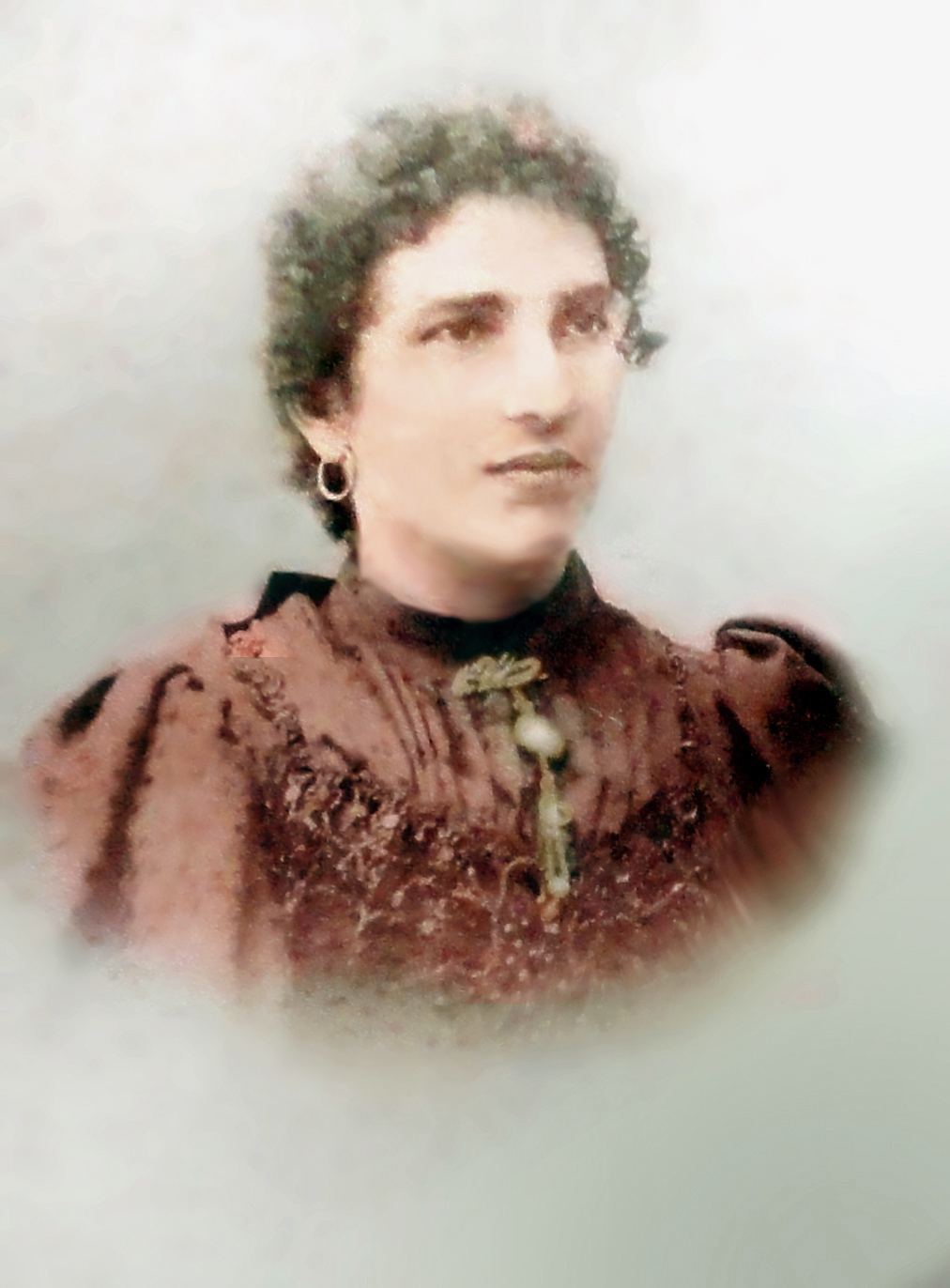
Maria Sartori.

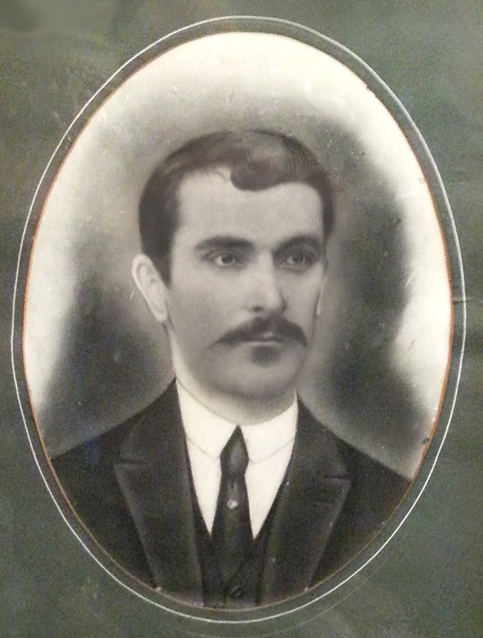
Ludovico Sartori.

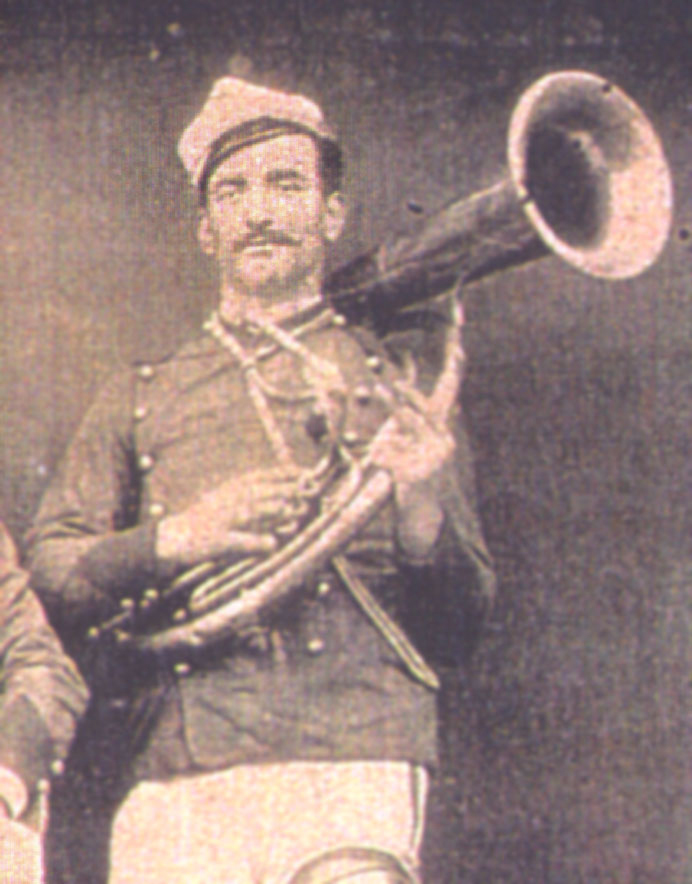
Alberto Sartori.

With Angela Zancaner, he had the following children:

- Maria, considered by Costamilan a person ahead of her time, breaking many prejudices that hindered the women of her generation, married first to the German baron João Daniel von Schlabendorff, a rich landowner, having with him two children who died in their childhood. Later, she married João Paternoster, a wealthy merchant and hotelier, sub-delegate of police, one of the founders and leaders of the Câmara de Indústria, Comércio e Serviços, and an active member in several other associations. Mary and John Paternoster were the parents of six children, most notably:
  - Dante, merchant, board member of the Companhia Vinícola Rio-Grandense, one of the founders of the Grêmio Esportivo São Pelegrino, director of the Sociedade Operária São José, and sponsor of one of the canvases of the Via Crucis by Aldo Locatelli in the Church of San Pelegrino;
  - Ida, socialite, female leader, honorary member of the Esporte Clube Juventude, one of the founders and first president of the cultural group Éden Juventudista, linked to the Recreio da Juventude, considered by Rigon "an avant-garde woman for her time" and "one of the most significant personalities in the history of Caxias do Sul";
- Carolina, one of the founders and counselor of the Associação Damas de Caridade, a charitable entity of relevant trajectory, founder and maintainer of the Pompeia Hospital. She married Ambrosio Bonalume, a great wine industrialist, with descendants;
- Amália, founder of the first chapel and great benefactor of the San Pellegrino Parish. She married Rafael Buratto, a brewery industrialist, and they were the parents of, among other children:
  - Raymundo Natal, one of the founders of the Recreio da Juventude and the Esporte Clube Juventude;
  - Hermenegildo Pascoal, hotelier, one of the founders and president of the Clube Juvenil, one of the founders of the Recreio da Juventude and of the first cinema in the city;
- Atílio, member of the Italian-Brazilian Band, founding partner of the Apollo Theater, the most emblematic show house in the city, and later politician and coffee farmer in São Paulo. He was married to Egide Guerra, with descendants;
- Ludovico, a great merchant, landowner, one of the founders of the Sociedade Príncipe de Nápoles, a partner in the city's first cinemas, a member of the commission for the cathedral's works, and one of the founders and director of the Câmara de Indústria, Comércio e Serviços, cited in 1915 as the largest contributor in property taxes in the city, being for years one of the ten largest. He married Agnes Moretto and they were the parents of ten children, most notably:
  - Honorino, one of the founders of Esporte Clube Juventude, a great player and then a counselor, president, honorary member and benefactor member of the club, besides being a cultural agitator and founder of one of the first newspapers in Caxias;
- Settimo, award-winning industrialist and founder of the city's first horseracing track. Married to Rosalba Maineri, with descendants;
- Lino Epifanio, merchant, founding member of the Sociedade Príncipe de Nápoles, one of the first to produce wine in the town, a major exporter, distillate producer, awarded in the United States twice. He married Thereza Varnieri, with descendants;
- Alberto, member of the Italian-Brazilian Band, industrialist, one of the largest wine exporters in Caxias, owner of several hotels, lieutenant of the General Staff of the 85th Reserve Battalion of the National Guard, and sub-intendent in the 3rd District in 1932. Alberto married Felicità dal Canale and produced great descendants, among whom can be cited:
  - Luís Victor Sartori, titular bishop of the Montes Claros and Santa Maria dioceses, left relevant works, and was an active figure in the articulation of the 1964 military coup;
  - Maria and Albertina Sartori, founding members of the Grêmio Feminino Republicano Liberal Evaristo Flores da Cunha, the first organized women's political center in the state;
  - Paulo Pedro, one of the founders and president of the Associação dos Cronistas Esportivos de Porto Alegre, judge at the Sports Justice Court, editor of the newspapers Hoje and Jornal do Dia, president of the Federação Atlética Riograndense, vice-president and counselor of the Associação Riograndense de Imprensa, director of the Department of Inspection of Public Entertainment Services, a censorship agency during the dictatorship, and secretary-general of the Federação das Associações Comerciais, among other attributions;
- Guerino, member of the Italian-Brazilian Band, ensign of the National Guard and one of the pioneers of the hotel industry in Torres. He married Santina Amoretti, one of the founders, treasurer, and counselor of the Associação Damas de Caridade, with descendants;
- Massimo, general merchant, shoemaker, butcher, and one of the first to offer cab service in Caxias, with carts pulled by donkeys. Married Pasqua da Rè, no descendants; they were Ida Sartori Paternoster's foster parents;
- Luigi Angelo, of obscure life, married to Emma Araldi. He died early, with no known descendants;

Other descendants, "of the finest flower of Caxias do Sul society", as Costamilan said, appear frequently quoted in the different newspapers of the first decades of Caxias do Sul, standing out in the cultural, social, sports, and economic fields, and marking a leadership in the structuring and development of the city in its first fifty years, when the city, starting from scratch, became one of the main economies of the state.

== See also ==
- History of Caxias do Sul
- Nobility of Italy
- Pietro Nosadini
- Sartori family

== Additional Reading ==
- Frantz, Ricardo André Longhi. Crônica das famílias Paternoster e Frantz e sua parentela em Caxias do Sul, Brasil: Estórias e História, Volume I, Volume II.
