= Floriano (footballer) =

Brazilian footballer (1903-1938)

Personal information
- Full name: Floriano Peixoto Correia
- Date of birth: 14 May 1903
- Place of birth: Itapecerica, Brazil
- Date of death: 19 September 1938 (aged 35)
- Position: Midfielder

Senior career*
| Years | Team | Apps | (Gls) |
| 1919–1920 | Internacional | | |
| 1921 | Juvenil de Caxias do Sul | | |
| 1922 | FC Porto Alegre | | |
| 1923 | Grêmio | | |
| 1924–1927 | Fluminense | | |
| 1928–1930 | America-RJ | | |
| 1930–1931 | São Cristóvão | | |
| 1931 | Barretos | | |
| 1932 | Santos | | |
| 1933–1935 | Atlético Mineiro | | |

International career
| 1925 | Brazil | 3 | (0) |

Managerial career
- 1933: Atlético Mineiro (caretaker)
- 1934: Atlético Mineiro (caretaker)
- 1935: Atlético Mineiro (caretaker)
- 1936–1937: Atlético Mineiro
- 1937: Vasco da Gama
- * Club domestic league appearances and goals

Floriano Peixoto Correia (14 May 1903 – 19 September 1938), known as just Floriano, was a Brazilian football coach and former player. He played in three matches for the Brazil national football team in 1925. He was also part of Brazil's squad for the 1925 South American Championship.

== Honours ==
=== Player ===
Grêmio

- Campeonato Gaúcho: 1923

America-RJ

- Campeonato Carioca: 1928

=== Coach ===
Atlético Mineiro

- Campeonato Mineiro: 1936
- Torneio dos Campeões: 1937
