= Recreio da Juventude =

Brazilian club

29°10′1.21″S 51°10′44.76″W
(Old social headquarters)

29°8′39″S 51°9′30.55″W
(Current social headquarters)

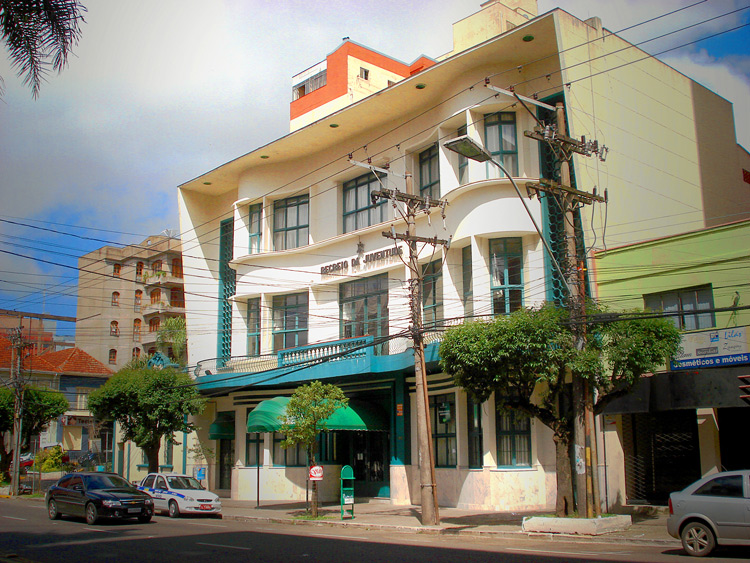
The social headquarters.

Recreio da Juventude (English: Youth Recreation) is a club in the Brazilian city of Caxias do Sul. Founded in 1912, it is one of the oldest and most traditional clubs in the city. It has engaged in intense social, cultural, recreational, and sports activities since its foundation; the Esporte Clube Juventude branched out from the club. Currently, the Recreio da Juventude has a social headquarters, a large countryside headquarters with sports and leisure equipment, and remains the owner of the building of the old Central Cinema, which although deactivated since 1990, was one of the main show houses in Caxias, offering cinema, theater, and music. It won several titles in sports and the Central Cinema and the social headquarters building are listed as a heritage site.

== History ==
The Recreio da Juventude was created on December 28, 1912, as a dissidence of the Clube Juvenil, by 29 young people in a house owned by José Bragatti, at 66 Júlio de Castilhos Avenue. Its name came from a provision in its first statute that admitted only single men; this restriction would soon be repealed. The first to assume the presidency was Ferdinando Jaconi. The official ceremonies to inaugurate the social headquarters took place on February 4, 1913, and began with a procession of ladies that left Ludovico Sartori's house in the morning carrying the flag made by the families of Caxias, which was delivered to the president in the first headquarters at Dante Alighieri Square, among cheers and speeches. Afterwards, there was a lunch at the Firenze Hotel, a civic march down Julio Avenue in the afternoon, and in the evening, the solemn inauguration of the board of directors and a dance that extended into the early hours of the morning.

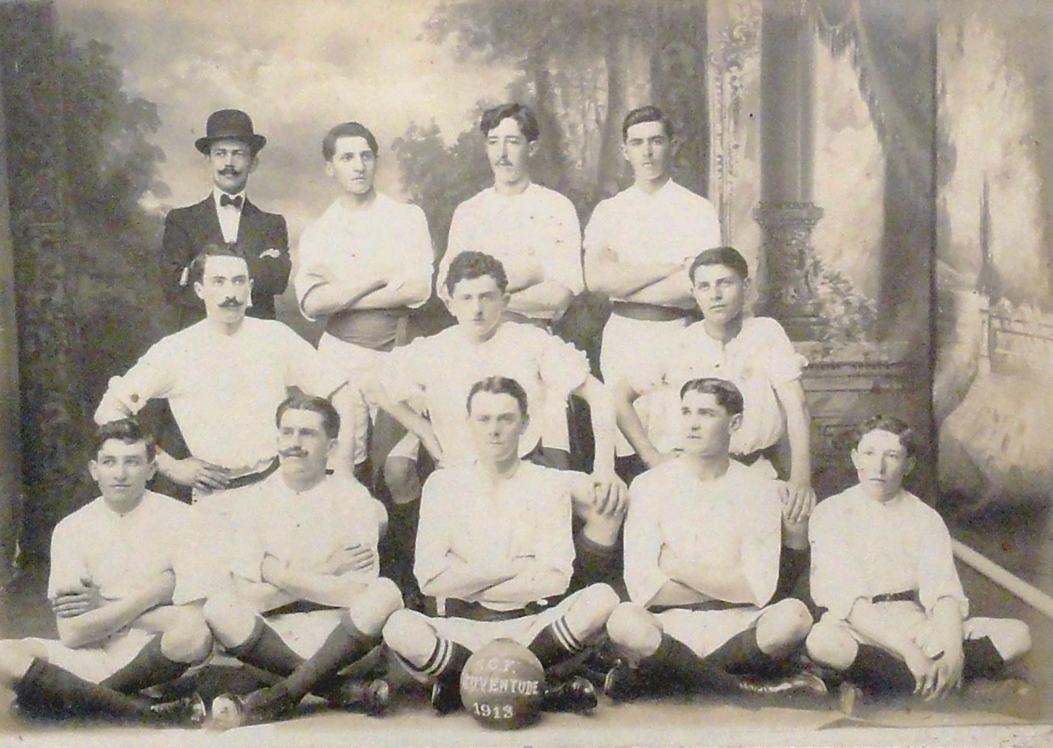
Recreio da Juventude's first team, 1913.

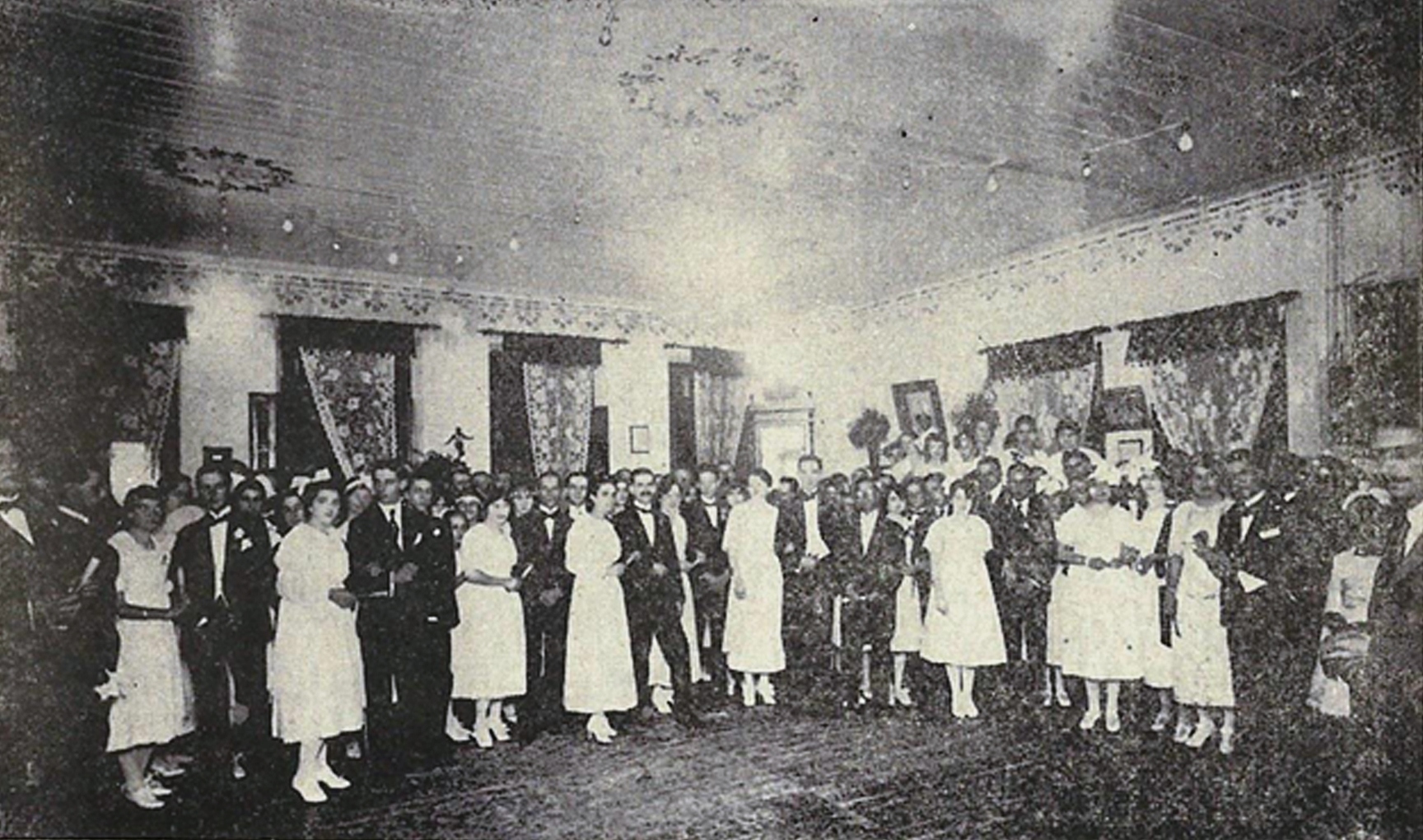
Inaugural ball for the first headquarters, 1918.

In the beginning, the club did not have its own headquarters and its main focus was soccer. The first team was amateur and established on June 29, 1913, with the name Sport Club Foot Ball Juventude. This creation drew the attention of the community of Caxias, and the entire day was marked by civil and religious ceremonies, parades, and parties; its first president was Antônio Chiaradia Neto. On March 16, 1915, it was decided to completely disassociate the soccer team from Recreio da Juventude, forming an autonomous entity. It is the current Esporte Clube Juventude, the oldest team in town still active.

From 1914 on, the social and recreational activities intensified, and by 1916 there was already one dance a month; the club's birthday parties were especially brilliant. Initially, it was defined as an elite club, achieving "beautiful results and charming graces for our social environment, gathering the hard-working people of this land, linking the families of our best society, pushing the youth to conquer more and more the true social culture", as described by the press of the time. When the Recreio was in the Círculo Operário Caxiense building, it hosted the first edition of the Grape Festival. It had several rented headquarters until it inaugurated its first facilities in 1918, in a big house located where the gardens of the Pompeia Hospital are today.

In 1924, the club inaugurated a large space for film projection in its headquarters, with a stable orchestra and capacity for 600 people. In 1925, the members bought a plot of land in Dante Square from the Sartori family to build the Central Cinema, a large movie theater that opened in 1928. The building had an elegant and richly decorated facade, with statuary and masks by Estacio Zambelli, matching the sumptuous interior decoration. As the same year it opened, the city had lost its Apollo Theater to a fire, the Central took over as the town's main playhouse.

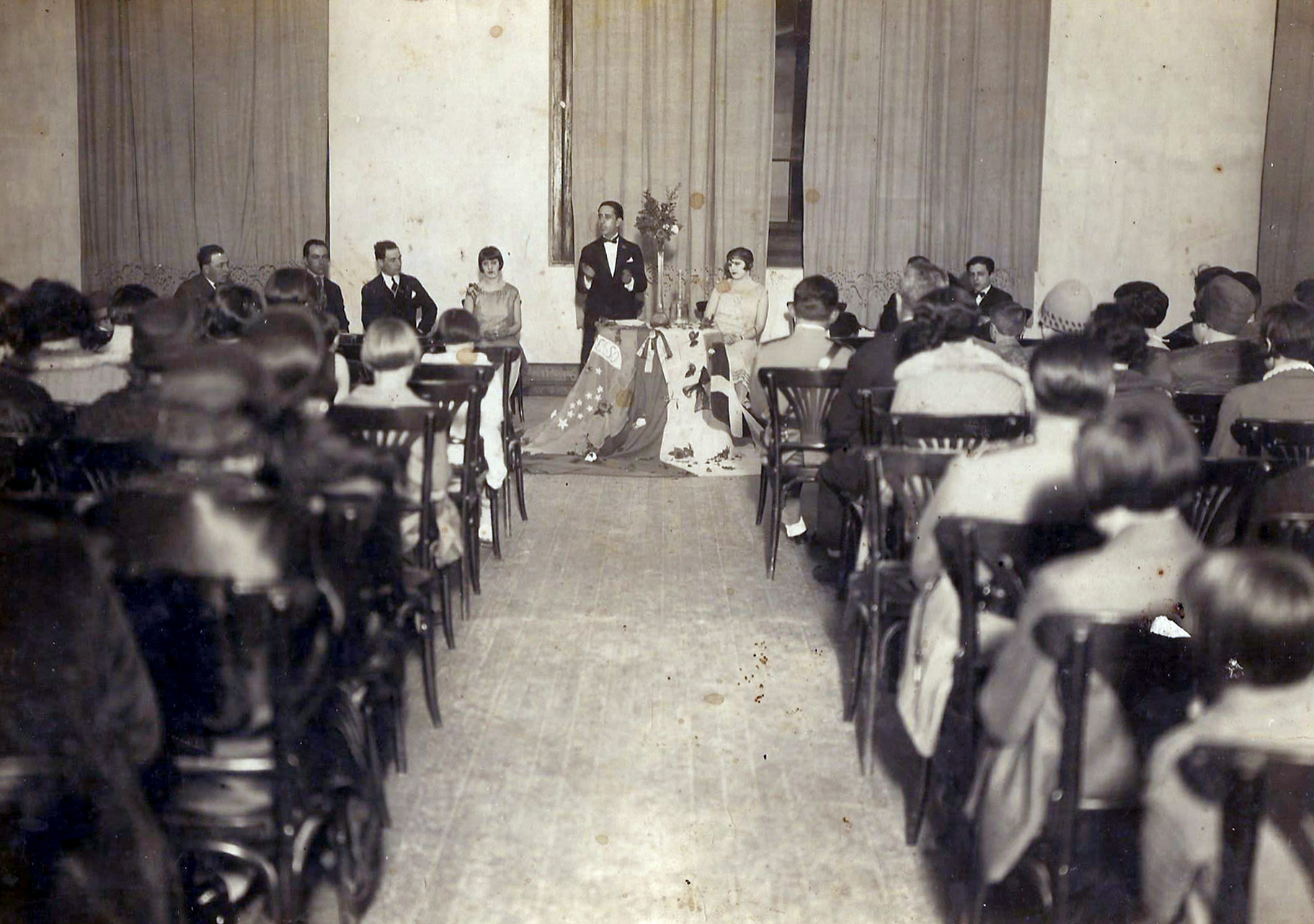
Founding assembly of the Éden Juventudista. In the background, standing, the poet Vico Thompson, next to him, seated, the first president Ida Paternoster.

A women's branch called Éden Juventudista was created in 1927. Éden was founded by the poet Vico Thompson and a group of society ladies, with Ida Sartori Paternoster as honorary president. It was the first cultural club in the city composed and managed by women. According to Rodrigo Lopes, "the Recreio da Juventude broke the customs of a very conservative time, allowing the feminine contribution in the organization of several cultural activities".

In 1939, the club had a patrimony of more than 600 contos de réis, and over 600 members, "the finest in the society of Caxias", and was described in the press as "a traditionally esteemed and respected society", that figured "in a prominent plan in our city". The Éden Juventudista had more than 200 members. In 1947, it started the construction of the current social headquarters at Pinheiro Machado Street 1762, a good example of modernist architecture, which was inaugurated in 1955. On December 10, 1958, it acquired land for the installation of its countryside headquarters, and in 2011 it incorporated the assets of the extinct Clube Guarany.

Throughout its history, the club has developed intense social, cultural, sports, and recreational activities, as well as promoting charitable activities. Its cultural department, created in 1956, holds a permanent schedule with events in several areas, such as classical music, theater, cinema, art exhibitions, lectures, popular shows, and thematic projects. In 2016, a partnership was signed with the University of Caxias do Sul to create a music school and a youth orchestra, foreseeing the establishment of workshops and an official concert season. In 2019, a project was launched to rescue the club's memory and create a historical collection. The Central Cinema, which had been falling into decay since the 1970s, closed permanently in 1990; then, the building was rented, and its interior was dismantled for other uses. The facade was declared a heritage site by the City Hall on December 15, 2008, along with the social headquarters building. According to the City Hall,

The protected complex, which belongs to the entity Recreio da Juventude, stands out for its architectural and evocative importance in the local urban landscape, in different styles and contexts of social and cultural life. The building on Júlio de Castilhos Avenue, known as the Old Central Cinema, was inaugurated in 1928. The volumetry and ornaments expressed its use as a house for shows and leisure. The boldness of the half-naked figures on the facade - a woman and two young men - caused controversy in the eminently Catholic community. At Pinheiro Machado street, we find the set composed by the remaining 1925 construction, connected to the social headquarters in modern style, with three floors and large glass facades that characterizes the urban landscape since its inauguration in 1955.

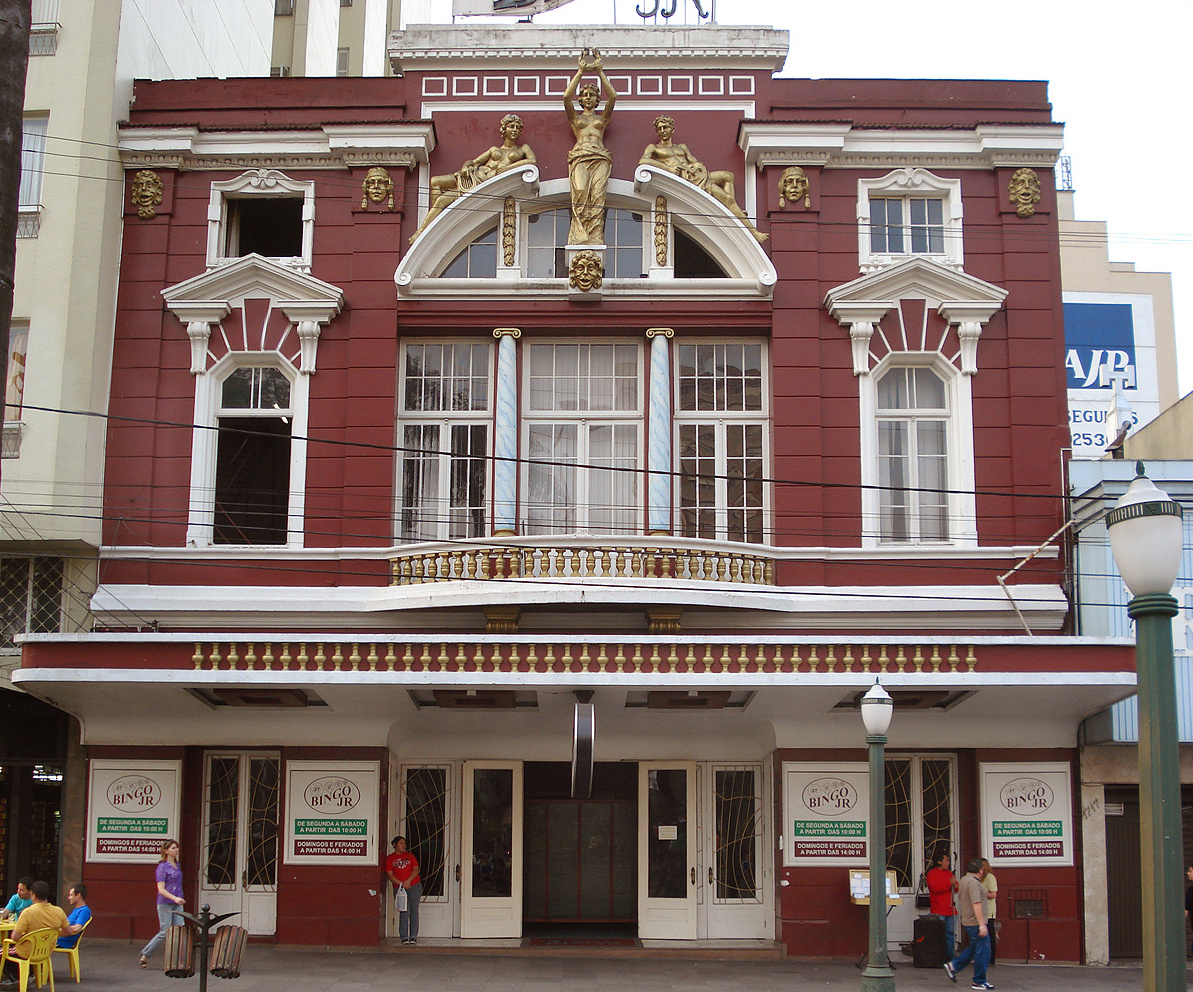
The old Central Cinema.

Its countryside headquarters is a large wooded park of 29 hectares, with swimming pools, barbecue grills, areas for events and shows, and courts for various sports. The incentive to sports has always been in the center of the interests, and a specific department was created to organize internal and open competitions, participate in local, state, and national contests, and contemplate many sports, including basketball, swimming, judo, soccer, handball, bocce ball, ping-pong, tennis, volleyball, and others. In the 1980s, the club gathered the largest number of tennis players in the state and the largest number of courts in the countryside. Its promotion of judo received national recognition. In 2016, the club received the Outstanding Trophy from the Regional Physical Education Council of the 2nd Region for its promotion of sports.

Three candidates from Recreio were queens of the Grape Festival: Roxane Torelly, Annemarie Brugger, and Marília Conte. In 1989 it received trophies as Outstanding Club RS and Best Debutante Ball of the state. In 2012, after celebrating its centennial, Recreio was honored in a solemn session of the City Council in recognition of "its role in the city's development" and for its "protagonist role in local daily life". In 2020, through Law No. 8,572, the City Hall declared Recreio a public utility institution. In 2022, the club was honored at the Grape Festival for having hosted the first edition of the event.

== Sports Titles ==
=== Handball ===
International, National and State
Competition	Titles	Seasons
Gaúcho Men's Handball Championship	3	2014, 2015, 2016
State Handball Championship	6	1999, 2000, 2001, 2002, 2003, 2004 categories infantile (2) and juvenile (4) male
Brazilian Club Championship	1	2004, men's cadet category
Curitiba International Handball Cup	1	2004, category 87/88

=== Judo ===
International, National and State
Competition	Titles	Seasons
National Judo Championship	7	1987, 1988, several categories
State Judo Championship	10	1998, 2007, several categories
Judo Summer Cup (State)	1	2003, junior men's category
South American Judo Championship	1	2003, men's pre-juvenile category, middle-lightweight
Summer Tournament (State)	1	2007, women's pre-juvenile category
Manoel Rodrigues Cação Cup (State)	3	2007, women's pre-juvenile category; 2008, men's junior category; 2009, men's junior category
Alberico Passadore Cup (Uruguay)	6	2007, categories 7–8 years old over 44 kg; 11–12 years old over 52 kg; junior up to 60 kg; junior up to 70 kg; senior up to 90 kg; senior over 100 kg
Santa Maria Cup (State)	2	2009, light female and heavy male categories

=== Basketball ===
International, National and State
Competition	Titles	Seasons
Minibasket State Championship	1	1989
Serrano Championship (Regional)	1	2007, sub-17 category
Children's State Championship	1	2007

=== Tennis ===
International, National and State
Competition	Titles	Seasons
Sogipa Open Championship (State)	1	1990, children's category
Gramado Tennis Cup (State)	3	2006, singles and doubles, category 12 (2); doubles, category 18 (1)
ALJ Tennis Cup (State)	1	2007, single mode, category 14

=== Cycling ===
International, National and State
Competition	Titles	Seasons
Gaúcho Middle Distance Championship	1	1990, women's category

=== Swimming ===
International, National and State
Competition	Titles	Seasons
General Indoor Winter State Championship	7
World Series - Parathletics	2	2022, categories 200m freestyle and 150 medley
State Summer Master Championship	54 gold medals	2004, 2008
Brazilian Masters Championship	1	2005, by team, small team category

=== Futsal ===
International, National and State
Competition	Titles	Seasons
Nordestão Cup	1	2005, children's category

=== Gymnastics ===
International, National and State
Competition	Titles	Seasons
Gymnastics State Championship - 2nd Division	1	2007, by team, children's category

== See also ==
- Historic Center of Caxias do Sul
