= Pietro Nosadini =

Italian Catholic priest and journalist

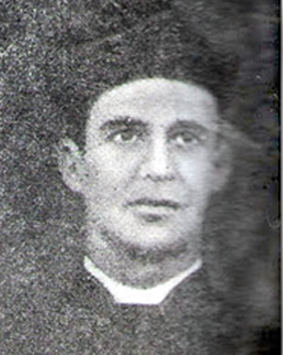

Personal life
- Born: 15 August 1862 Bassano del Grappa, Italy
- Died: 25 March 1921 (aged 58) Padua, Italy
- Occupation: Catholic priest and journalist

Pietro Antonio Maria Umberto Nosadini (Bassano del Grappa, August 15, 1862 – Padua, March 25, 1921) was an Italian Catholic priest and journalist.

He played a notable role in several parishes in Italy as a militant supporter of ultramontanism, founding many organizations. He spent a season in Brazil, in the early days of Italian immigration in Rio Grande do Sul, and is remembered for his short and tumultuous but remarkable period in Caxias do Sul, where he exercised a strong leadership in the Catholic community in one of the most troubled periods of the city's history, and for his pioneering work in the field of regional press. His role in the process of socio-political emancipation of the Italian settlers has also been noted, contributing, through the common bond of religion, to the union of dispersed and culturally conflicting groups, and to the creation of a collective identity where the settler was portrayed as a tireless, orderly, moral worker and promoter of progress and civilization.

== Life ==
=== Early years ===
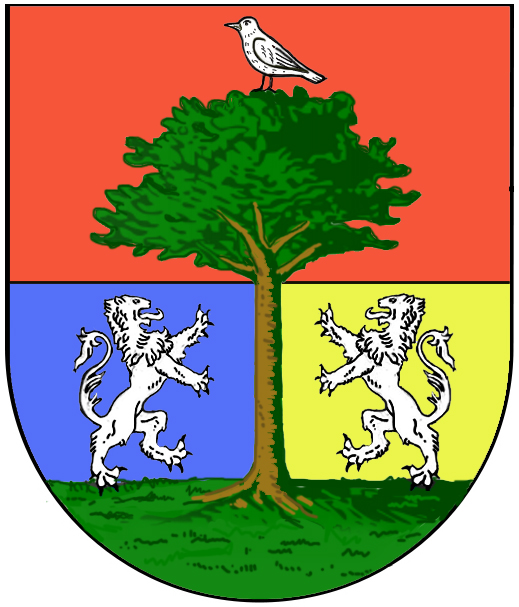
Nosadini Coat of Arms

Pietro Nosadini came from an old family of Bassano del Grappa, which was added to the patriciate of Bassano in 1691 and to the patriciate of Venice in 1694. He was the first of the four children of Giuseppe Giovanni Battista Nosadini and Catterina Capellari and a devout Catholic even before his ordination. He became involved in the activities of the Italian Catholic Youth, and was secretary of the Circle of Bassano-Veneto in 1884. According to Costamilan, he was also secretary of his parish between 1884 and 1889, and "in spite of his young age, his gifts of unusual intelligence and his enterprising genius were evident, as is shown in the historical books that cover the evolution of Catholic action in Italy". His work was noted and cited several times by the Vicenza Olympic Academy, which led him to give a speech on the Peter's Pence during the Vicenza Regional Conclave on August 20, 1889.

Shortly thereafter he joined the seminary of Ceneda, where he studied until 1894, then went to Rome, where he obtained a degree in Journalism. In Rome he was one of the founders of the Pious Union of St. John Berchmans, which aimed to form the spirit of young people from wealthy families within a pure Christian life. The society was approved by the Cardinal Vicar of Leo XIII on March 12, 1895, who appointed Nosadini as its first director. The association seems to have begun to flourish quickly, since a report of activities that Nosadini sent to the pope in July 1895 was answered with praise and encouragement for his work. He did not stay long in Rome because he had not yet taken his religious vows, which were only pronounced in Ceneda on March 25, 1896. He was then ordained a priest and began preparations for an apostolate in Brazil, in accordance with a life plan he had defined in Rome.

=== Activities in Caxias do Sul ===
He arrived in Brazil shortly after his ordination, heading to Caxias do Sul, the nucleus of a prosperous Italian colony. His first record in the village is from May 22, 1896, already as coadjutor of Giovanni Battista Argenta, vicar of the St. Theresa's Cathedral. Shortly afterwards, on July 15, 1896, Nosadini succeeded Argenta in the parish administration, while José Cândido de Campos Júnior was the intendant. Linked to ultramontanism, Nosadini defended the primacy of the Church in all matters, both secular and religious, and fiercely opposed liberalism, scientism, positivism, Freemasonry, and other progressive philosophies. These disputes raged at the end of the 19th century both in Italy and in Brazil.

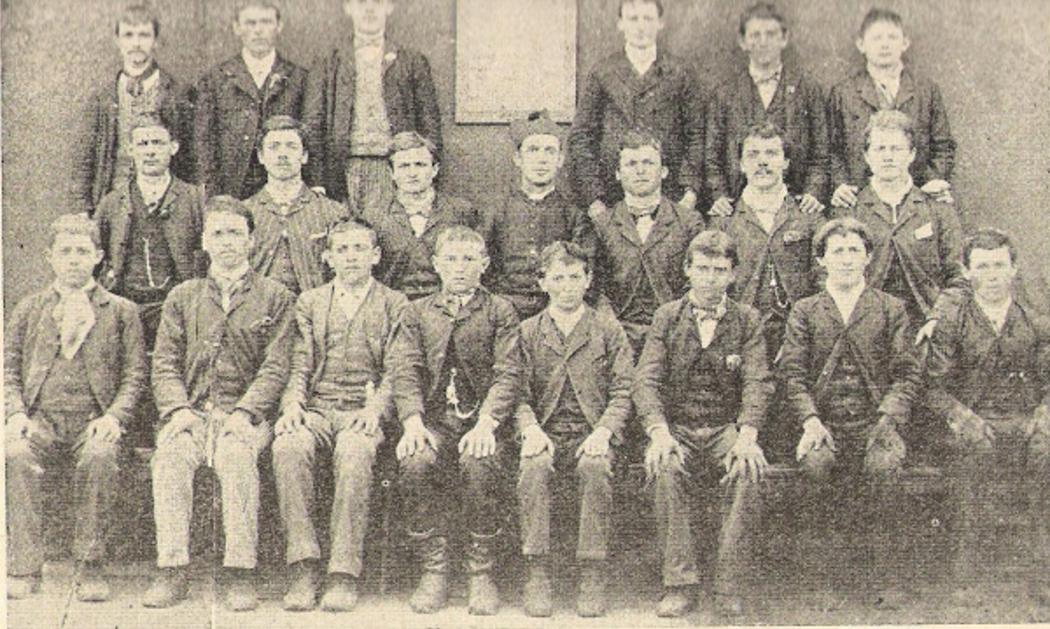
Father Nosadini at center, with students from the Parish School of Caxias do Sul

Nosadini began his pastoral work by founding a series of committees in both urban and rural areas. These associations became known as Catholic Leagues and aimed to strengthen the influence of the Church in the region and to dissolve progressive currents, as well as to sustain the struggle for the return of the former Papal States to the Pope. According to Gustavo Valduga, Nosadini believed that all those who did not join the committees and refused them the sacraments were heretics, which led him to launch a campaign of civil disobedience against the determinations of the Public Power that went against the orthodox Catholic precepts. At the same time, he harshly criticized Campos' government and blamed Freemasonry for the state of tension and disorder that plagued the Italian colony, since the local population was massively Catholic, while Campos was Grand Master of the local masonic lodge Força e Fraternidade (English: Strength and Fraternity). Most of the main civil authorities of the village were also connected to Freemasonry, and the ideology of the Rio-grandense Republican Party, which was in the government of the state and also of the village, was aligned to positivism.

At the time, the priest denied the accusations cited by Valduga, claiming to be an obedient follower of the law that guided his followers to do the same, and saying that he had never refused the sacraments to any Catholic. In any case, it did not take long for his opinions to trigger strong opposition from the Intendency, which saw the priest as an inciter of revolts and an embarrassment to its purposes. Therefore, the confrontations and accusations between them multiplied, but Nosadini knew how to win the respect of the population in a short time. According to Maria Abel Machado, the priest was always a supporter of the people and spoke their language, receiving many public expressions of appreciation. He also earned the support of important local leaders, such as Caetano Costamilan, Salvador Sartori, João Michele, Antônio Moro, Luiz Michielin, Luiz Baldessarini, and Ambrósio Bonalume. According to Loraine Giron, the priest was a powerful force in organizing and unifying the Catholic community, and under his leadership "the Catholic movement gained strength and became feared". Eliana Alves and Márcia Sanocki consider that, in addition to the specifically religious aspect, the priest was an important agent in the early stages of the political emancipation process of the settlers and the formation of an immigrant elite, which began to dispute the power with the authorities of Luso-Brazilian origin, taking advantage, as Alves observed, of the gap created by the lack of harmony within the public administration itself, since the Intendency represented one part of the interests, and the Municipal Council, another. The Council itself was divided between Catholics and Masons, although the latter prevailed. Indeed, in a context in which the immigrants came from different Italian regions, were heirs of old cultural, social and political rivalries, and even spoke dialects that were sometimes almost incomprehensible to each other, religion was a decisive factor in uniting everyone around common goals. In the words of Alves:

Nosadini served as an intellectual of the rural type, identified by Gramsci as a member linked to the peasant and petty-bourgeois social mass of the cities, who puts the peasant mass in contact with the state or local administration, which gives him a great political and social function. [...] Father Nosadini played exactly the role attributed to the intellectual of the rural type, because the organization of the Italian settlers, in order to request the resolution of their problems, started from his action. [...] During his period in Caxias do Sul, the priest mobilized the settlers around the committees in such a way that, at the slightest sign of discontent, the Catholics promoted manifestations of displeasure, always criticizing the administration.

Despite the great support he had, the tension reached a critical point and ended in violence. Nosadini was warned by João de Barros Cassal, former police chief and member of the Governing Council of Rio Grande do Sul of 1891, that his life was in danger. In fact, he was attacked on February 8, 1897, when the parish house was surrounded by an armed band led by Guido Livi, Angelo Chitolina, and João Lorenzo Vigo, who shot at the residence, invaded it, stabbed, beat, and kidnapped the priest, taking him under a halter to a remote rural area, where he was put to death. However, his executioners changed their minds at the time and let him live, on the condition that he leave Caxias do Sul immediately. Once released, the priest went to the house of his friend Caetano Costamilan in the Loreto district to treat his wounds, and then took refuge in Nova Pádua.

At this point, the conflict that had settled in Caxias reached the state authorities, who began to interfere. The bishop of Rio Grande do Sul, Dom Cláudio Ponce de Leão, going against Campos' wishes, placed the priest in charge of the parish in Caxias do Sul, and took his decision to the state president Júlio de Castilhos, who ordered the intendant of Caxias do Sul to guarantee his full reinstatement in his functions, which would only occur a few months later. On June 14, 1897, a large caravan of supporters picked him up in Nova Pádua and brought him back to Caxias do Sul, where he was received with tributes, fireworks, and festivities organized by the Catholics.

After that, Campos and Nosadini tried to establish a friendly and cooperative dialogue, but the peace did not last long. On October 15, 1897 O Caxiense, the first newspaper of Caxias do Sul began to circulate, belonging to the organ of the Rio-grandense Republican Party and linked directly to the Intendency. Already in the first issue the priest was accused of harming the civic festivities celebrating the Italian Unification and the proclamation of the Riograndense Republic. A few days later, the Santa Cecilia Band, funded by the Municipality, began to perform in public the Papal Hymn, without proper justification, arousing Nosadini's indignation. Other attacks on the priest and the Catholic Leagues followed in successive editions of O Caxiense.

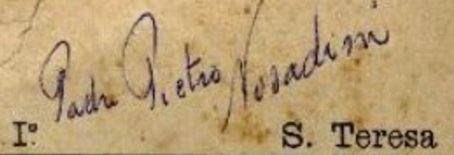
Father's signature on the first edition of Il Colono Italiano

In response, Nosadini founded, on January 1, 1898, the second village newspaper, Il Colono Italiano, where he defended his projects and ideas and organized large popular assemblies bringing together the Catholic Leagues in a demonstration of power. The atmosphere quickly degenerated again into open conflict. The intendant gathered the main Catholic leaders and asked for their support for the definitive removal of the priest and to dissolve the Leagues as a measure of precaution, and on March 20 he telegraphed the State Government predicting tragedies:

The Nosadini issue aggravates. Animosity rises. Insane work to calm down tempers. Sunday [13/03/1898] he preached truthfully, causing indignation. Last night [19/03/1898] he held a secret meeting at Sartori's house and declared he was waiting for the opportunity to depose me, because he thought it was dangerous for him to remain in the parish. Fanatical settlers advised by him are capable of trying. I will die defending the principle of authority.

The situation escalated, and on March 24, 1898, the intendant suffered an alleged bullet attack, accusing the Sartori family and Ambrosio Bonalume as the instigators. However, there were no witnesses and he was unharmed. The priest, supported by the Catholic committees, reacted strongly against these accusations, and historian Angelo Ricardo Costamilan believes that the attack was a hoax set up by the intendant to incriminate the priest and his friends and facilitate his removal from the village. The State Government was again called upon to intervene by both parties, who remained in conflict. In mid-1898 both O Caxiense and Il Colono Italiano ceased circulation, and in December, finally succumbing to multiple pressures, the bishop removed Nosadini from the parish.

Rosali Bergozza also recalled the priest's interest in education, being the creator of the Cristóforo Colombo Educational Institute, which did not become a reality because of the constant disputes in which he was involved.

=== Final years ===
After being expelled from Caxias do Sul, Father Nosadini returned to Italy, being assigned to work in the Diocese of Concordia. There he met, in 1899, the Brazilian bishop Monsignor José de Camargo Barros, head of the Archdiocese of Curitiba, who was participating in the Latin American Council, to whom he asked for a parish in Paraná, obtaining his consent. On August 21, 1899, he was welcomed in Curitiba, being indicated to heal the souls of the colonies of Rondinha, Timbutuva, Rio Verde and Campina, in the region of Campo Largo, and Antônio Rebouças, with residence in Rondinha. However, at the end of 1900 he asked for a dispensation because of the small amount of work that was available there and the limited conditions that the small population had to maintain a priest. He left the colonies on March 16, 1901, and headed to Italy.

Back in his country, on September 22, 1901, he was nominated deputy for school vigilance in Vigonovo, and at the end of the year he was chaplain, making his mark by advocating the installation of an organ in the church. At the time it was reported about him:

On that day [January 1, 1902] the chaplain Don Pietro Nosadini, a volcanic Basque priest recently returned from Brazil after an agitated experience, went up to the pulpit and gave a sermon that was to remain famous for years: 'Most beloved brothers! New year, new life! For us, new life means organization, because we have had enough of the old harmonium". The sermon aroused a sea of enthusiasm and an ocean of opposition: common sense people wanted the debts of the belfry to be paid first. But this was no argument, especially when we have Don Pietro, capable of setting up committees, launching appeals and gathering applause; common sense is not an argument, and in fact, after 18 months of struggles, projects and anxiety, the new organization is there, monumental and full of new debts.

He then worked in various parishes in the Province of Vicenza, always founding new Catholic associations, and by the end of 1908 he was in Ceneda, where he became an oblate. He went on to serve the Diocese of Padua and once again made himself known for his tireless dedication, serving as secretary of the Fourth Group of the Catholic Movement, an association with outstanding activity in the region. In 1912 he was ecclesiastical assistant to the Diocesan Youth Federation and in the same year he organized the Youth Circle in the parish of Santa Maria Assunta in Saccolongo. The following year he is mentioned as the owner of an altar in the Church of the Most Holy Redeemer in Fellette and then appears as spiritual bursar of the parish in Selvazzano. He died on March 25, 1921, while working as a curate chaplain of the Minor Brothers of the Poor Old People in Padua, the day he celebrated the 25th anniversary of his priestly ordination. On December 28, 1959, the City Hall of Caxias do Sul named a street after him.

== Il Colono Italiano ==
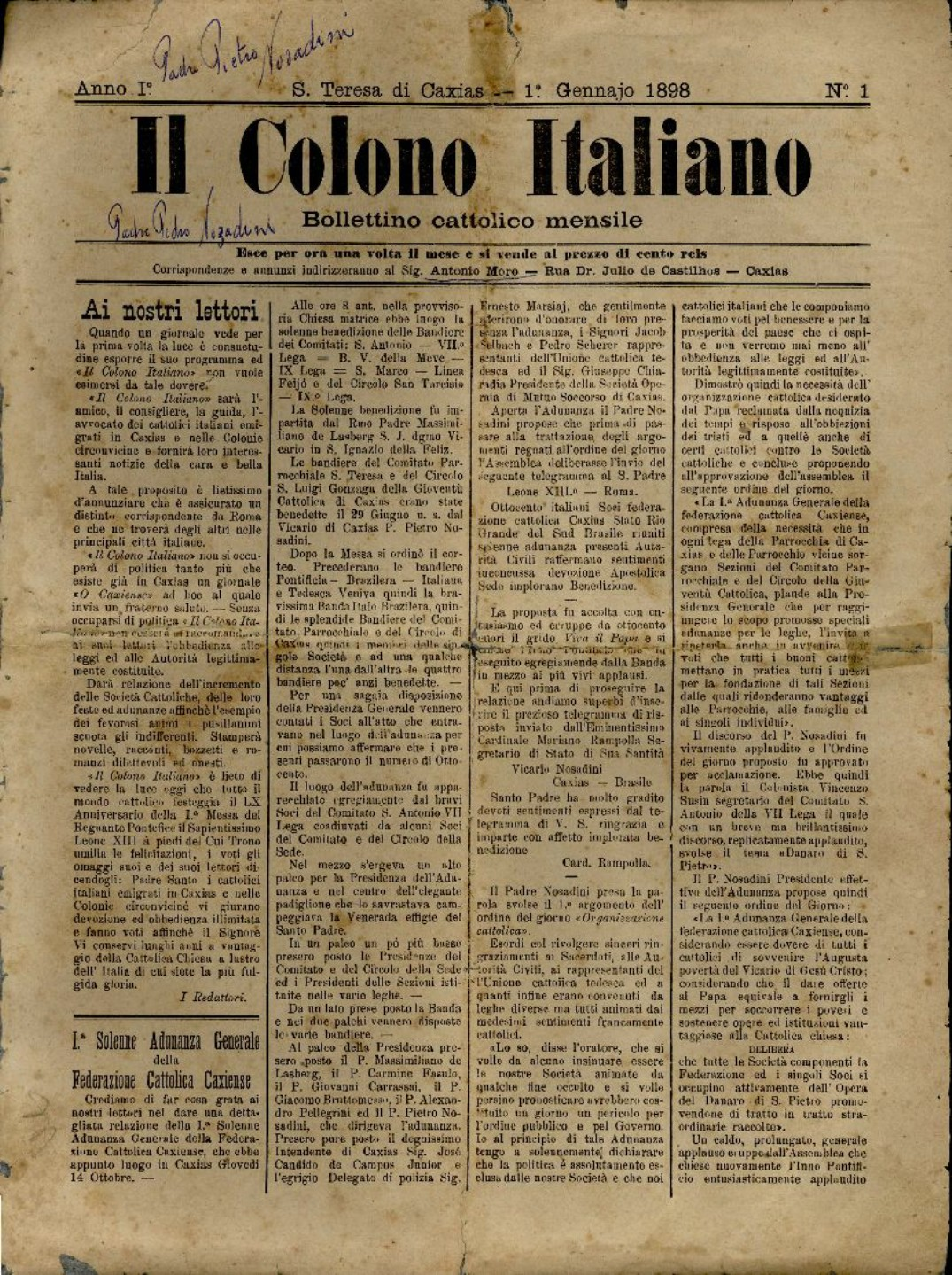
First page of the first edition of Il Colono Italiano, with the signature of Pietro Nosadini

The newspaper founded by the priest, Il Colono Italiano, Bollettino Cattolico Mensile, (Note: Il Colono Italiano was also the second name of what is now the Correio Riograndense) has been remembered by several historians for the role it played in the political and religious history of Caxias do Sul. Released on January 1, 1898, and printed in Porto Alegre, it featured his program in its first issue:

Il Colono Italiano will be the friend, the counselor, the guide, the lawyer of the Italian Catholics immigrating to Caxias do Sul and the surrounding colonies. It will provide them with interesting news from dear and beautiful Italy. For this purpose it is pleased to announce that it has a distinguished correspondent in Rome and that it will find others in the main Italian cities. Il Colono Italiano will not be concerned with politics, since there is in the city O Caxiense - to which we send a fraternal greeting. Without being involved in politics, Il Colono Italiano will not cease to recommend to its readers obedience to the laws and to the authorities legitimately constituted. It will give an overview of the development of Catholic Societies, their festivals and actions, so that they may serve as an example of fervent encouragement to cowards and indifferent people. It will publish novels, stories and novels that are entertaining and honest.

Rovílio Costa, Loraine Giron and Gustavo Valduga pointed out the ambiguity of this declaration of purposes, because if it was going to protect and guide the "Italians", despite its claim of defending the constituted authorities, it was implicit that the interests of the Italians would prevail over the Brazilians. In fact, at that time few immigrants considered themselves Brazilians, and the newspaper was written in Italian. Included in this conception was an unrestricted fidelity to papal authority, which was declared right at the end, when the priest addressed the Pope stating that "the Italian Catholics immigrated in Caxias do Sul and neighboring colonies swear devotion and unlimited obedience to you". At the same time, the newspaper was committed to combating Freemasonry and other progressive philosophies. Giron noted that while O Caxiense "had a nationalist and conservative rhetoric, defending the government of Júlio de Castilhos and its centralized power, Nosadini had a discourse of clear defense of the Pope, then a prisoner of the Vatican. [...] His speech is doubly subversive, because at one time he attacks the Kingdom of Italy, of which he is a subject, and as a foreigner he manifests himself politically, which was forbidden". As Valduga stated, "the journal was born in the middle of regional disagreements and disputes, and no matter how much it wanted to distance itself from them, it was always involved in issues that concerned it". According to Márcia Sanocki, the newspaper is a good reflection of the contradictions on which were settled the foundations of the creation of a colonial elite, which sought to assert itself politically and sought in the working class and peasant population the necessary support, but often opposing the Public Power, and in these struggles for power the Church and its newspaper gave this desired support, "always on the side of the nascent local mercantile and industrial group". The journal also helped to build an image of the settler as a tireless worker, orderly, pacifist, promoter of progress and creator of wealth, an ideology that would gain progressive momentum in the first decades of the 20th century and that constituted at that time one of the strongest identity marks of the Caxias do Sul society, creating a rich folklore that lasts until today. At the same time, the newspaper defended that work itself has edifying value, but the progress predicted for the colony could only occur under the guiding precepts of religion. It was evident that the newspaper's content, in that context, brought an explosive element. Due to the conflicts, it ceased circulation in August 1898. On Valduga's balance sheet,

The first experience of the Catholic press in the colonial region had lasted only eight months and had succumbed to the political clashes between the clergy and the Freemasons. However, this newspaper had already given the basic guidelines on which the regional Catholic press was to be based, that is, the unconditional defense of the papacy, associating the immigrant identity with the figure of the orderly and hardworking Italian Catholic.
