= Juan Fernando Angulo =

Catholic Bishop

Most Reverend Juan Fernando Angulo
- Bishop of Santa Marta
- Church: Catholic Church
- Diocese: Diocese of Santa Marta
- In office: 1536–1542
- Predecessor: Alfonso de Tobes
- Successor: Martín de Calatayud

Personal details
- Died: Jul 1542 Santa Marta, Colombia

Juan Fernando Angulo (died 1542) was a Roman Catholic prelate who served as Bishop of Santa Marta (1536–1542).

== Biography ==
On 6 Sep 1536, Juan Fernando Angulo was appointed during the papacy of Pope Paul III as Bishop of Santa Marta. He served as Bishop of Santa Marta until his death in Jul 1542.

== External links and additional sources ==
- Cheney, David M. "Diocese of Santa Marta". Catholic-Hierarchy.org. (for Chronology of Bishops) ^{[self-published]}
- Chow, Gabriel. "Metropolitan Diocese of Santa Marta (Colombia)". GCatholic.org. (for Chronology of Bishops) ^{[self-published]}

Catholic Church titles
Preceded by Alfonso de Tobes	Bishop of Santa Marta; 1536–1542	Succeeded by Martín de Calatayud
