= Martín de Calatayud =

Bishop

Most Reverend Francisco de Navarra y Hualde
- Church: Catholic Church
- Diocese: Bishop of Santa Marta.
- In office: 1543–1548
- Predecessor: Juan Fernando Angulo
- Successor: Juan de los Barrios

Orders
- Consecration: December 1547 by Jerónimo de Loayza

Personal details
- Born: 1501 Calatayud, Spain
- Died: November 9, 1548 (age 48)

Martín de Calatayud (1501 – November 9, 1548) was a Roman Catholic prelate who served as Bishop of Santa Marta (1543–1548).

== Biography ==
Martín de Calatayud was born in Calatayud, Spain and ordained a priest in the Orden de San Jerónimo. On December 19, 1543, Pope Paul III appointed him Bishop of Santa Marta. In December 1547, he was consecrated bishop by Jerónimo de Loayza, Archbishop of Lima with García Díaz Arias, Bishop of Quito, and Juan Solano, Bishop of Cuzco, as co-consecrators. He died on November 9, 1548.

== See also ==
- Catholic Church in Colombia

== External links and additional sources ==
- Cheney, David M. "Diocese of Santa Marta". Catholic-Hierarchy.org. (for Chronology of Bishops) ^{[self-published]}
- Chow, Gabriel. "Metropolitan Diocese of Santa Marta (Colombia)". GCatholic.org. (for Chronology of Bishops) ^{[self-published]}

Catholic Church titles
| Preceded by Juan Fernando Angulo | Bishop of Santa Marta; 1543–1548 | Succeeded by Juan de los Barrios |
