= Juan Víctores de Velasco =

Roman Catholic prelate (1644–1713)

Most Reverend Juan Víctores de Velasco
- Bishop of Trujillo
- Church: Catholic Church
- Diocese: Diocese of Trujillo
- In office: 1707–1713
- Predecessor: Pedro Díaz de Cienfuegos
- Successor: Diego Montero del Aguila
- Previous post: Bishop of Santa Marta (1694–1707)

Orders
- Consecration: 21 Oct 1694

Personal details
- Born: 1644 Burgos, Spain
- Died: 10 Dec 1713 (age 69)

Juan Víctores de Velasco, O.S.B. (1644–1713) was a Roman Catholic prelate who served as Bishop of Trujillo (1707–1713) and Bishop of Santa Marta (1694–1707).

== Biography ==
Juan Víctores de Velasco was born in Burgos, Spain in 1644 and ordained a priest in the Order of Saint Benedict. On 19 Jul 1694, he was appointed during the papacy of Pope Innocent XII as Bishop of Santa Marta. On 21 Oct 1694, he was consecrated bishop at the convent San Martín in Madrid, Spain. On 28 Nov 1707, he was appointed during the papacy of Pope Clement XI as Bishop of Trujillo. He served as Bishop of Trujillo until his death on 10 Dec 1713.

While bishop, he presided over the priestly ordination of Salvador Bermúdez y Becerra, Bishop of Concepción (1704).

== External links and additional sources ==
- Cheney, David M. "Diocese of Santa Marta". Catholic-Hierarchy.org. (for Chronology of Bishops) ^{[self-published]}
- Chow, Gabriel. "Metropolitan Diocese of Santa Marta (Colombia)". GCatholic.org. (for Chronology of Bishops) ^{[self-published]}
- Cheney, David M. "Archdiocese of Trujillo". Catholic-Hierarchy.org. (for Chronology of Bishops) ^{[self-published]}
- Chow, Gabriel. "Metropolitan Archdiocese of Trujillo (Peru)". GCatholic.org. (for Chronology of Bishops) ^{[self-published]}

Catholic Church titles
Preceded by Gregorius Jacobus Pastrana	Bishop of Santa Marta; 1694–1707	Succeeded by Ludovicus de Gayoso
Preceded by Pedro Díaz de Cienfuegos	Bishop of Trujillo; 1707–1713	Succeeded by Diego Montero del Aguila
