= Javier Naranjo Villegas =

Heriberto Correa Yepes
- Bishop emeritus of Diocese of Santa Marta
- Church: Roman Catholic Church
- See: Diocese of Santa Marta
- In office: 1971 - 1980
- Predecessor: Norberto Forero y García
- Successor: Félix María Torres Parra
- Previous post(s): Priest

Orders
- Ordination: March 15, 1942

Personal details
- Born: 21 January 1919; Abejorral, Colombia
- Died: 7 March 2014 (aged 95)

Javier Naranjo Villegas (21 January 1919 – 7 March 2014) was a Colombian Prelate of Roman Catholic Church.

Villegas was born in Abejorral, Colombia and was ordained a priest on March 15, 1942. Villegas was appointed bishop of the Diocese of Santa Marta on June 2, 1971 and consecrated on June 29, 1971. Villegas remained at the Diocese of Santa Marta until his resignation on July 24, 1980.

== External links and additional sources ==
- Cheney, David M. "Diocese of Santa Marta". Catholic-Hierarchy.org. (for Chronology of Bishops)^{self-published}
- Chow, Gabriel. "Metropolitan Diocese of Santa Marta". GCatholic.org. (for Chronology of Bishops)^{self-published}
