= José Cândido de Campos Júnior =

Brazilian politician and lawyer (1854-1939)

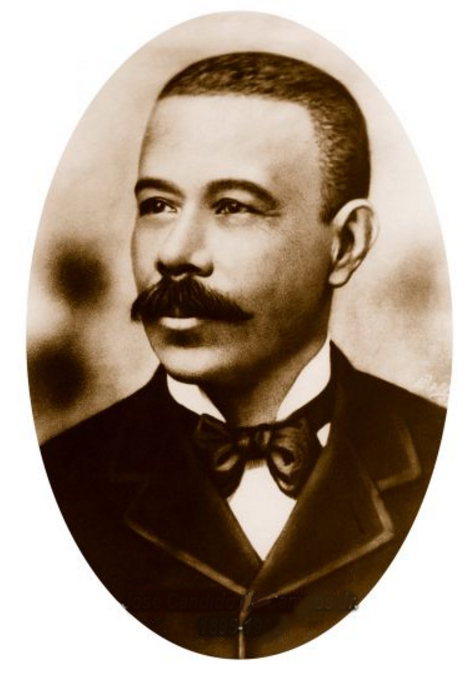
- Born: 1854; Santo Antônio da Patrulha, Rio Grande do Sul, Empire of Brazil
- Died: 1939 (aged 84–85); Porto Alegre, Rio Grande do Sul; Brazil
- Occupation: Politician

José Cândido de Campos Júnior (Santo Antônio da Patrulha, 1854 - Porto Alegre, 1939) was a Brazilian politician and lawyer

== Biography ==
Campos Júnior, son of José Cândido de Campos and Honorata, was born into a poor and obscure family. He was mulatto and descended from slaves, a fact almost always omitted by official historiography. He reportedly lost his father at an early age and became the family breadwinner by working as a musician and then as a public employee. He joined the Rio-Grandense Republican Party (PRR), obtained a law degree and then, through the PRR, was appointed to the position of prosecutor of the Comarca of Vacaria.

Later, he became municipal secretary of Caxias do Sul and assumed the Intendency by nomination of the state president, Júlio de Castilhos, after the resignation of the previous intendant, Alorino Machado de Lucena, being appointed on September 30 and sworn in on October 11, 1895. At the same time, he also became Grand Master of the local Masonic Lodge, Força e Fraternidade. The PRR was strongly attuned to the positivist philosophy and had broad support in Freemasonry, to the point that most of the most influential public positions were held by Freemasons. Campos Júnior governed during one of the most turbulent periods in the history of the village of Caxias, since the place was in the process of structuring its most basic functions as a municipality, and there were still difficulties and shortages in all areas. Until 1884 it was a colony, and from that date until 1890 it was a district of São Sebastião do Caí.

In Caxias, most of the settlers who constituted its population were Italians from different regions who had arrived in Brazil bringing many of the old social, political and cultural rivalries that had divided Italy for long centuries into a multiplicity of independent states. The rivalries between the settlers were replicated in the public administration and in the City Council, which was divided into divergent political currents.

On taking office, Campos Júnior found a precarious government structure and an agitated social environment, which worsened after the arrival of Father Pietro Nosadini in early 1896. Dynamic, charismatic, combative and a great organizer, Nosadini soon managed to unite the settlers around the Catholic religion, a cultural element that was common to all. He was a supporter of ultramontanism, a Catholic current that preached the primacy of the Church in both sacred and secular matters. He also fiercely fought freemasonry and progressive philosophies such as positivism, and under his leadership the people began to organize and demand measures that would serve their interests, accusing the administration of the backwardness and confusion in which the village found itself. According to Loraine Giron, "the priest was a powerful force in organizing and unifying the Catholic community, and under his leadership the Catholic movement gained strength and became feared". In fact, according to Eliana Alves, even before Nosadini's arrival, Campos' appointment to the Intendency "caused vehement discontent among Italian Catholics", and with the presence of the priest inflaming the mood, everything got worse. Besides political and ideological differences, Campos Júnior took very unpopular measures, such as banning the traditional morra game, one of the favorite hobbies of Italian settlers, alleging that it promoted disorder and crime.

On September 24, 1896, Campos Júnior was brought back to power by popular vote, taking office on October 13. However, conflicts increased, leading to violence. On February 8, 1897, Nosadini was the victim of an attack in public that almost took his life, and on March 24, 1898, Campos Júnior suffered a second one, which was not witnessed by anybody and caused no injuries. He accused Ambrosio Bonalume and members of Salvador Sartori's family, who were strong supporters of Nosadini and important leaders in the community, as the authors of his attack, but the allegations were vigorously refuted and did not gain credibility among the population. Angelo Costamilan believes that Campos Júnior put on an act in order to incriminate Nosadini and provide a good excuse for expelling him from the village, since Campos Júnior considered him to be a nuisance and an inciter of revolts. The conflicts with the Catholics calmed down after Nosadini's transfer in December 1898, but the situation was not peaceful. According to Alves, "the expulsion of Father Nosadini did not diminish the complaints of the settlers. The existing resentments, in the face of the Portuguese predominance, led the settlers to request more effective Italian consuls, since those who lived in Caxias needed to appeal against the prepotency of the local authorities. The settlers complained that the officials sent by the PRR in their co-optation accommodation were travelers in this city and enriched themselves at the expense of the soup prepared by the immigrants".

On September 29, 1900, Campos Júnior won his second election, but in view of his great rejection, according to Giron and Magie, his victory may have been the result of electoral fraud. At the end of 1901, his accounts were rejected by the council, which accused him of overspending and accumulating debts. A new tax had to be imposed and a loan taken out to cover the shortfall. In addition, Campos Júnior clashed with the influential Associação dos Comerciantes, which brought together the local business elite, by not recognizing its legal legitimacy and not receiving its demands. The Associação began to fight him and boycott the collection of fees and taxes, requesting the support of the State Government. According to Maria Abel Machado, "the situation worsened when the attacks began to be made on a personal level, through an article published in the newspaper Independente, where the local chief executive insulted the president of the Associação. The reaction of the class entity was immediate through an article published in the three main newspapers of Porto Alegre, A Federação, Correio do Povo and Stella d'Itália, making public the conflict that existed with the intendant Campos Júnior".

Despite having many supporters, having received tributes from sympathizers and having described himself in a press release as "one of the most beloved intendants of Rio Grande do Sul", in April 1902 his administration began to be attacked with a series of accusations of mismanagement and embezzlement. Campos Júnior said he would accept an audit to prove his innocence, but he did not resist pressure and resigned on July 1. According to Loraine Giron, Campos Júnior's administration "was so unorthodox that, when he left the municipal government, the budget gap was bigger than its annual revenue". Vice-intendent Alfredo Soares de Abreu took over in his place and denounced the "chaotic state" in which the administration was. The State Government was forced to intervene and ordered the opening of an inquiry to investigate the facts, which was led by Captain Firmino José Rodrigues, who concluded that "there was an embezzlement of 100 contos de réis", and the cause was mismanagement and not theft, as had been suggested; the 100 contos seems to have been overestimated, and today it is indicated to be half that amount. Although the conclusion of the investigation did not indicate theft, Campos Júnior himself admitted that it had occurred, but accused the Intendency's doorman, Justino Cesar de Araújo, as the person responsible; his justification was not well accepted. The finances were only recovered many years later through bank loans and tax increases. Due to the permanent turmoil, his government, despite the promises he had made, ended without any major achievement, but it is worth remembering the foundation of the first newspaper of the village, owned by him and called Caxias, which was short-lived.

After his resignation, Campos Júnior moved to Antônio Prado and then to Vacaria, but almost nothing is known of his life until his death, except that he sought financial compensation several times from the Intendency of Caxias for the expenses he allegedly had in his official duties, and that he always denied the accusations of having illicitly enriched himself during his government. In 1932, one of his appeals was successful and he was refunded six contos de réis. Campos Júnior described himself as a promoter of progress in Caxias and, in letters and articles he published in the press, listed a number of personalities from the elite of the city who could attest to his honesty and meritorious works, including Abramo Eberle, João Paternoster, Miguel Muratore and Adelino Sassi. However, according to Nicole Magie, there is no evidence that any of the names he mentioned actually came to his defense or were even sympathetic to his cause. His image remains controversial to this day.

Campos Júnior was married to Clarice Silvestre and left five children. One of them, the lawyer Antônio Selistre de Campos, was the second judge of the Comarca of Canoinhas.

== See also ==
- History of Caxias do Sul
