= Clube Juvenil =

Brazilian association

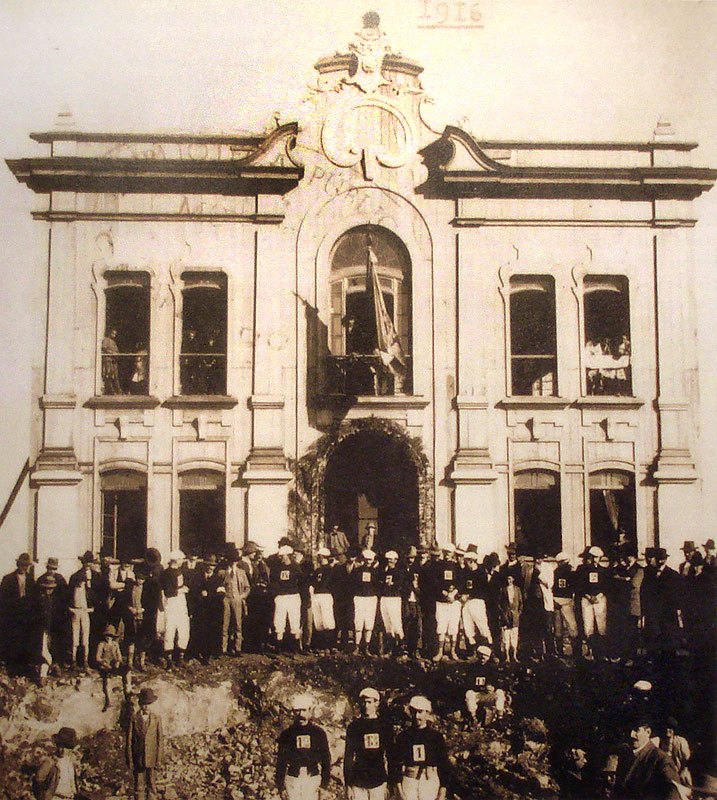
The club's first headquarters, 1916.

29°10′3.52″S 51°10′42.89″W

The Clube Juvenil (English: Youth Club) is based in the Brazilian city of Caxias do Sul, in the state of Rio Grande do Sul. Founded in 1905, it is one of the oldest and most traditional social and recreational organizations in the city. It created the first adult soccer team and the first cinema in Caxias do Sul. In 2021, the headquarters were closed and the building was made available for rent.

== History ==
The Clube Juvenil is one of the oldest and most traditional social and recreational associations in Caxias do Sul. It was created by Américo Ribeiro Mendes, Carlos Giesen and Henrique Moro, who, dissatisfied with the limited options for recreation in the city, invited twenty young people to establish a club; on the scheduled day, June 19, 1905, only eleven guests showed up. The foundation ceremony occurred in José Bragatti's house, whose upper floor served as the temporary headquarters of the new entity. The first board of directors consisted of Carlos Giesen as president, Dante Panarari as vice-president, Américo Mendes as secretary, Henrique Moro as treasurer, Archimino Selistre de Campos as official speaker, and Vitório Rossi and Antônio Guelfi as party directors. The first statutes stipulated that only single men would be admitted, but the restriction was revoked. It also stated that their functions would be "to promote all kinds of entertainment for the most excellent families of this town, such as balls, picnics, country walks. The parties will be held monthly at the expense of the club".

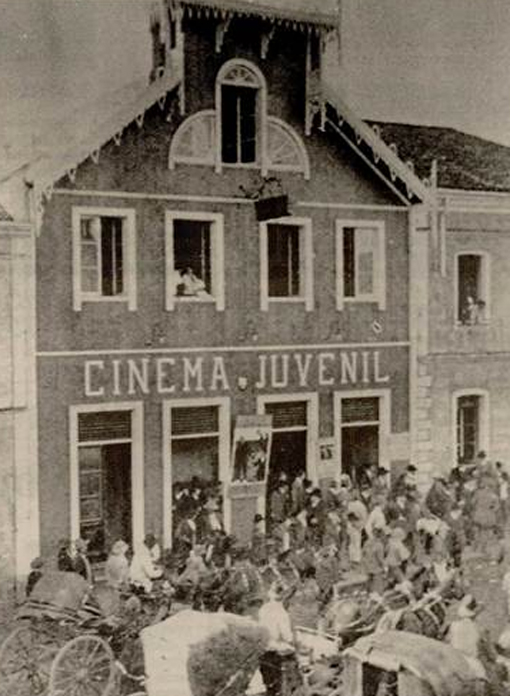
Second seat of the cinema at the Clube Juvenil.

On July 23, the club held its first ball. On December 31, the first gala ball occurred and the board of directors was installed. Although the community sympathized with the club, some politicians began to demand a politicized stance from the board, which caused friction and persecution. Carmine Fasulo, the vicar of the parish church, also launched a campaign against the association. The conflicts continued for several years and were exacerbated by financial difficulties.

In 1907, the Clube Juvenil founded the Juvenil Cinema, the first movie theater in Caxias do Sul. In 1908, Nair Ronca was elected the first Juvenil Queen. In the same year, the headquarters were moved to a larger building, also rented, where the Pompeia Hospital is located today; the big civic celebrations for the arrival of the train in 1910 were held on the site. A plot of land in Andrade Pinto Street, now Os 18 do Forte Street, was chosen for the new headquarters. On June 19, 1912, the building was inaugurated amid great festivities, which involved a solemn assembly, acclamations, banquets, sports competitions, a civic march and a gala ball. It included a large ballroom, restaurant, billiards room, space for indoor games and bowling.

In 1911, the club launched a campaign to build the Juvenil Theater, which was inaugurated with performances by an Italian drama company simultaneously with the club's headquarters. The venue held dramas, comedies, concerts, magic shows, circus acts, school parties, lectures and charity promotions. In 1914, the club began organizing its own theatrical group, whose income from performances would be used to pay off the debts from the construction of the building.

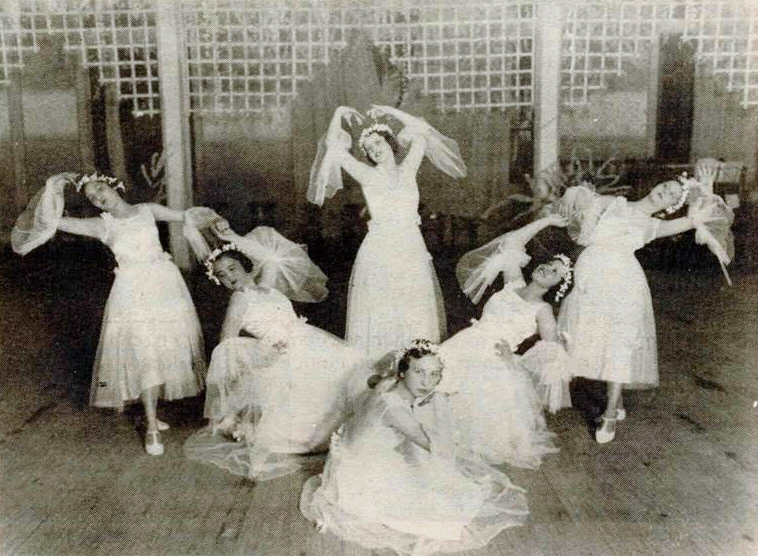
Presentation of the Falenas in 1935.

In 1912, the club founded a soccer team under the name Grêmio Foot Ball Juvenil, which incorporated some of the members of Sport Club Ideal and had Carlos Giesen as its first president. At the time, the club enjoyed significant social, recreational and cultural activities, but it was restricted to married members. In 1913, a group of young bachelors founded the Recreio da Juventude, which also founded its own team, the Esporte Clube Juventude. Sporting competitions became more frequent, other clubs appeared and culminated in the creation of the Citadino Championship. Juvenil was also one of the founding members of the Rio Grandense Sports Federation (now the Football Association of Rio Grande do Sul) in May 1918.

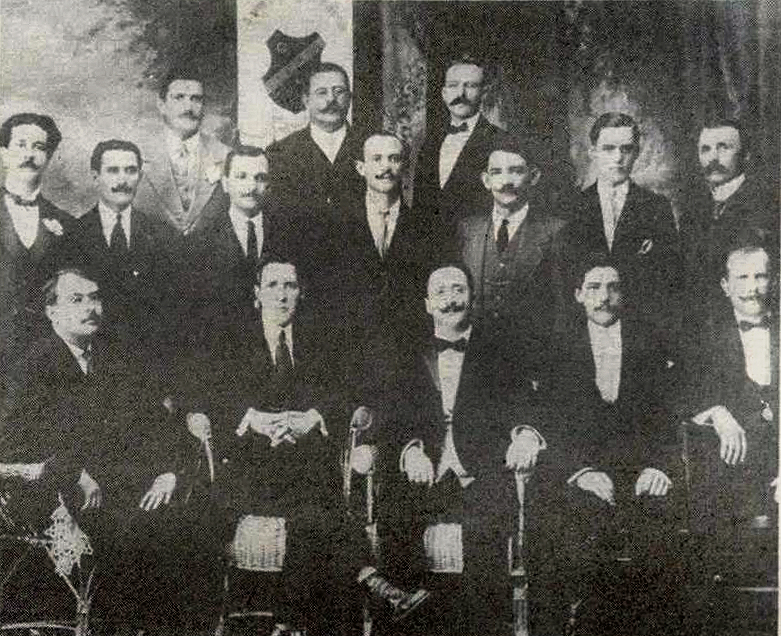
Founders of the club in 1905.

Since 1922, women have participated in the Falenas, a semi-independent group that developed artistic, social and charitable activities with the collaboration of young men. Didila Saldanha was its first president and it ran until 1967. In 1924, the headquarters and adjoining theater were destroyed by a fire and the administration was temporarily transferred to the headquarters of the Associação dos Comerciantes. On December 8, 1928, the new headquarters on Júlio de Castilhos Avenue was inaugurated. In 1936, a large library with national and foreign works was opened. In 1954, the club absorbed the Clube de Natação Caxiense and transformed it into its recreational headquarters, with swimming pools, sports courts, a children's playground and a restaurant. In 1955, the club celebrated its fiftieth anniversary with grand balls and solemnities attended by authorities and Miss Brazil Martha Rocha.

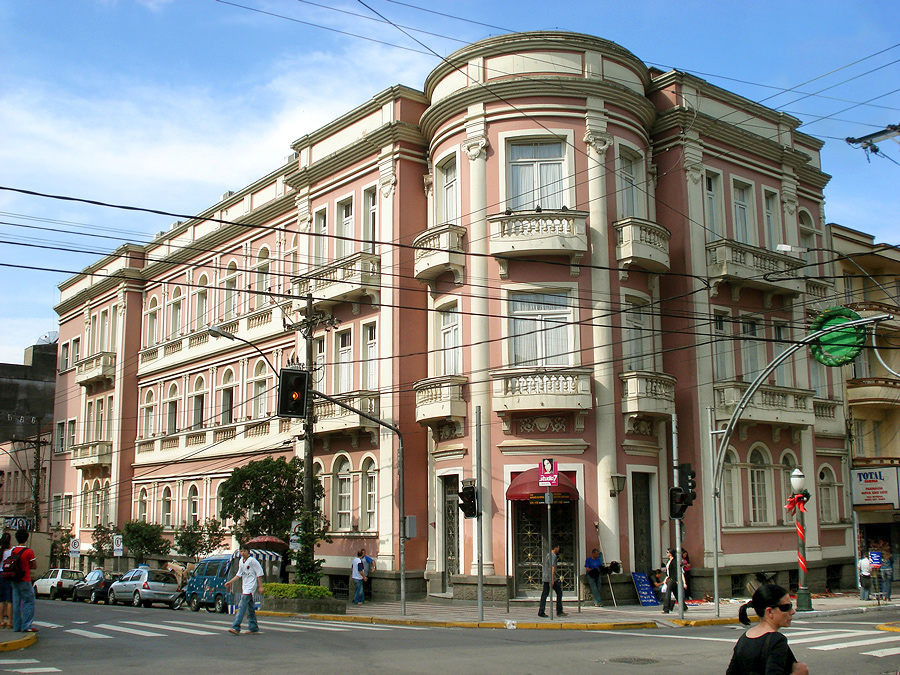
Clube Juvenil headquarters.

In the 1960s, the building underwent a major renovation that added a third floor. In 1977, a room in the headquarters was converted into a 150-seat theater. Due to the significant influence the club played in the history of Caxias do Sul, it has accumulated a significant historical, artistic and documentary collection, which led to the creation of the Department of Research and Historical Collection in 1990, coordinated by history professor Juarez Ribeiro Mendes in collaboration with historian Mário Gardelin and the Municipal Historical Archive, which is responsible for safeguarding the collection. The objective was to preserve, organize and publicize the remaining material. A call to the community to donate objects, photographs and other materials related to the club's history was also made. In 2001, a project to build a 90-hectare headquarters in São Francisco de Paula was developed.

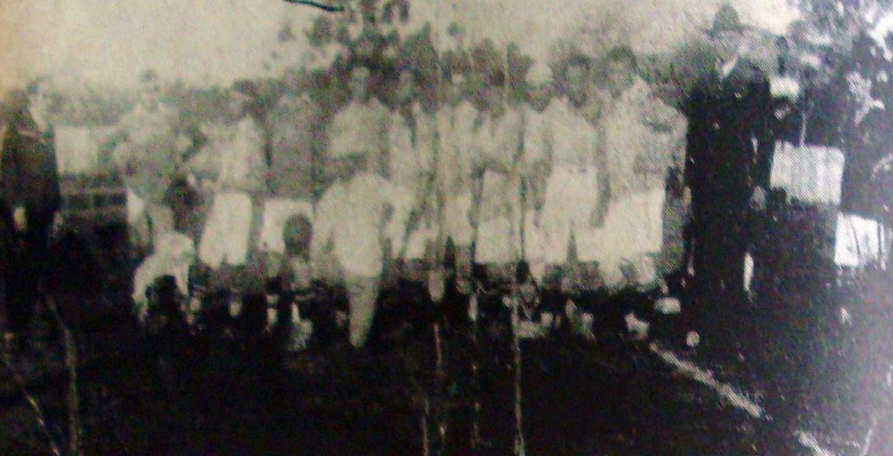
The club's first soccer team, 1912.

Besides parties and gala balls, the club regularly organized cultural activities for the entire local community, such as art exhibitions, concerts, recitals, literary soirees, political and civic events. An extensive cycle of activities was scheduled to celebrate the club's centenary in 2005. The Sempre Juvenil Project, which aimed to recover the history of Caxias do Sul and its relationship with social, political, economic and cultural development, stood out. It involved José Clemente Pozenato and Elisabeth Longhi Frantz, president of the Centenary Commission. With the collaboration of museologists and historians, the project was developed in three stages: First Act - The Character and the Setting; Second Act - The Ball; Third Act - The Work and Its Authors, which included extensive historical research, retrieval of oral memory, cataloging of the historical and iconographic collection, creation of a museum space and didactic exhibitions of photographs, documents and objects.

After the centenary celebrations, a difficult period began. In 2007, the social headquarters was listed as a landmark site by the City Hall, but activities declined and were suspended in 2019. The premises were closed to the public, the restaurant was shut down and the building was put up for rent in 2021. The board claimed they couldn't afford to maintain the property and believed that the rental income would help solve the club's problems.

== Titles ==
=== Municipal ===
- Citadino Championship of Caxias do Sul: 1927 (Champion); 1920, 1922, 1925, 1928, 1929 and 1930 (Runner-up).

== See also ==
- History of Caxias do Sul
