= Diocese of Santa Marta =

Diocese of the Catholic Church in Colombia

Diocese of Santa Marta Dioecesis Sanctae Marthae Diócesis de Santa Marta

Catholic
- Coat of arms of the Diocese of Santa Marta.

Location
- Country: Colombia
- Territory: The Municipalities of Santa Marta, Ciénaga, Aracataca, Zona Bananera and Pueblo Viejo.
- Ecclesiastical province: Barranquilla

Statistics
- Area: 14,216 km^{2} (5,489 sq mi)
- Population: Total; Catholics: (as of 2010); 780,000; 680,000 (87.2%)

Information
- Denomination: Roman Catholic
- Rite: Latin Rite
- Established: 10 January 1534
- Cathedral: Cathedral Basilica of Saint Martha in Santa Marta
- Patron saint: Saint Martha

Current leadership
- Pope: Leo XIV
- Bishop: José Mario Bacci Trespalacios, C.I.M.
- Metropolitan Archbishop: Pablo Emiro Salas Anteliz
- Bishops emeritus: Ugo Eugenio Puccini Banfi

Map

Website
- diocesisdesantamarta.org

The Roman Catholic Diocese of Santa Marta (Latin: Sanctae Marthae) is a diocese located in the city of Santa Marta in the ecclesiastical province of Barranquilla in Colombia.

== History ==
- January 10, 1534: Established as Diocese of Santa Marta from the Diocese of Santo Domingo in the Dominican Republic

== Bishops ==
=== Ordinaries ===
- Alfonso de Tobes (Appointed 1534 - Did Not Take Effect)
- Juan Fernando Angulo (1536–1542 Died)
- Martín de Calatayud (1543–1548 Died)
- Juan de los Barrios (1552–1564 Appointed Archbishop of Santafé en Nueva Granada)
- Juan Méndez de Villafranca (1577–1577 Died)
- Sebastián Ocando (1579–1619 Died)
- Leonel de Cervantes y Caravajal (1621–1625 Appointed Bishop of Santiago de Cuba)
- Lucas García Miranda (1625–1629 Died)
- Antonio Corderiña Vega (1630–1640 Resigned)
- Juan de Espinoza y Orozco (1642–1651 Died)
- Francisco de la Cruz (1658–1660 Died)
- Francisco de la Trinidad Arrieta (1661–1663 Died)
- Melchor de Liñán y Cisneros (1664–1668 Appointed Bishop of Popayán)
- Lucas Fernández de Piedrahita (1668–1676 Appointed Bishop of Panamá)
- Diego de Baños y Sotomayor (1677–1683 Appointed Bishop of Caracas, Santiago de Venezuela)
- Gregorius Jacobus Pastrana (1684–1690 Died)
- Juan Víctores de Velasco (1694–1707 Appointed Bishop of Trujillo)
- Ludovicus de Gayoso (1713–1713 Died)
- Antonio Monroy y Meneses (1715–1738 Resigned)
- José Ignacio Mijares Solórzano y Tobar (1740–1742 Died)
- Juan Nieto Polo del Aguila (1743–1746 Confirmed Bishop of Quito)
- José Javier de Arauz y Rojas (1746–1753 Confirmed Archbishop of Santafé en Nueva Granada)
- Nicolás Gil Martínez y Malo (1755–1763 Died)
- Agustín Manuel Camacho y Rojas (1764–1771 Appointed Archbishop of Santafé en Nueva Granada)
- Francisco Javier Calvo (1771–1773 Died)
- Francisco Navarro (1775–1788 Died)
- Anselmo José de Fraga y Márquez (1790–1792 Died)
- José Alejandro de Egües y Villamar (1792–1796 Died)
- Diego Santamaría Cevallos (1798–1801 Died)
- Eugenio Sesé, C.R.S.A. (1801–1803 Died)
- Miguel Sánchez Cerrudo (1804–1810 Died)
- Manuel Redondo y Gómez (1811–1813 Died)
- Antonio Gómez Polanco (1817–1820 Died)
- José María Estévez (1827–1834 Died)
- José Luis Serrano (1836 Appointed – 12 May 1852 Died)
- Bernabé Rojas (1854–1858 Died)
- Vicente Arbeláez Gómez (1859–1864 Appointed Coadjutor Archbishop of Santafé en Nueva Granada)
- José Romero (1864–1891 Died)
- Rafael Celedón (1891–1902 Died)
- Francisco Simón y Ródenas (1904–1912 Resigned)
- Francisco Cristóbal Toro (1913–1917 Appointed Bishop of Antioquía-Jericó)
- Joaquín Garcia Benitez (1917–1942 Appointed Archbishop of Medellín)
- Bernardo Botero Álvarez (1944–1956 Appointed Archbishop of Nueva Pamplona)
- Norberto Forero y García (1956–1971 Retired)
- Javier Naranjo Villegas (1971–1980 Resigned)
- Félix María Torres Parra (1980–1987 Appointed Archbishop of Barranquilla)
- Hugo Eugenio Puccini Banfi (1987–2014 Retired)
- Luis Adriano Piedrahíta Sandoval (2014–2021 Died)
- José Mario Bacci Trespalacios, C.I.M. (since 2021)

=== Auxiliary bishops ===
- Pedro José Rivera Mejía (1951-1953), appointed Bishop of Socorro y San Gil
- Alfredo Rubio Diaz (1953-1956), appointed Bishop of Girardot

=== Other priests of this diocese who became bishops ===
- Salvador Bermúdez y Becerra, appointed Bishop of Concepción in 1731
- Luis Gabriel Ramírez Díaz (priest here, 1993-2006), appointed Bishop of El Banco in 2014
- Miguel Fernando González Mariño, appointed Auxiliary Bishop of Ibagué in 2016

== See also ==
- Roman Catholicism in Colombia
