= Eliana Alves Cruz =

Brazilian journalist and writer

Eliana Alves dos Santos Cruz (born 1966) is a Brazilian journalist and writer. Her works primarily focus on fiction and short stories, with an emphasis on Afro-Brazilian perspectives. She most recently published Meridiana on October 14, 2025. Her works have garnered national recognition and several prestigious literary awards.

== Life and career ==
Eliana Alves Cruz was born in Rio de Janeiro, in 1966. She graduated in social communication from Faculdade da Cidade in 1989. She took a post-graduate course in corporate communication at Cândido Mendes University. She worked as press manager for the Brazilian Confederation of Aquatic Sports and covered 15 world championships, six Pan-American Games, and six Olympic Games.

She published her first novel, Água de Barrela, in 2016, telling the story of her family's journey since leaving Africa in the 19th century. The novel earned her the Oliveira Silveira Literary Award from the Cultural Palmares Foundation.

In 2016, she also published stories in the anthologies Cadernos Negros (Quilombhoje); Perdidas: Histórias para Crianças que Não Tem Vez (Imã Editorial).

In 2018, she began writing for the Brazilian edition of The Intercept website, addressing issues related to racism and slavery.

From 2014 to 2019, she wrote for the blog, Flor da Cor (Flower of Color), focusing on the promotion of female Afro-Brazilian accomplishments in several areas of academia.

In 2022, the author published A Vestida: Contos, which earned her the prestigious Jabuti Award for best short story.

In 2025, she published a children's book titled Milena e o Pássaro Antigo (Milena and the Ancient Bird), based on the Turma da Mônica comics character.

She remains an active voice on racial and sex-based issues through her personal Instagram page and as a writer for various Brazilian journalism platforms. She has also been a featured guest speaker at several conferences focused on black literature to promote her works and speak on current social issues.

Eliana Alves Cruz has Beninese, Nigerian, Ivorian, Sierra Leonean, Ugandan, Gambian, and North African heritage.

== Literary thematic focus ==
In an interview with Le Monde Diplomatique, Cruz shared that her literature is driven by questions about identity, Brazilian history, and especially by experiences of Afro-Brazilians. She emphasized her goal of recovering silenced narratives that expose racial inequality as a result of slavery, aiming her works as a place of social reflection and exploration of memory, ancestry, and the Black experience.

In an interview published on Medium, Cruz explains that her novel, O Crime do Cais do Valongo, highlights how her experiences and observations of racism and social injustice in Brazil inform the narrative. She shared that the novel reflects her interest in examining the country’s modern racial dynamics through the lens of historical inequality. Cruz also described her overall literary commitment to addressing racial issues through fiction, giving visibility to Afro-Brazilian experiences.

Her work is recognized for a use of multiple narrative viewpoints, known as polyphonic storytelling, allowing different characters to represent distinct social classes, lived experiences, and races to personify the complexity of Brazilian history and identity. Alvez' work brings African-Brazilian history again into the contemporary world wherein its lasting effects can be analyzed and understood by the public, no longer being erased and forgotten.

As Cruz notes, "We live in apartheid in Brazilian literature. We need to tell our story and dare to imagine a future. We have to look back, understand how things happened and dare to think of a tomorrow".

== Notable works ==
=== Água de Barrela (Lye Water) ===
The first of Eliana Alves Cruz's literary portfolio is the novel Água de Barrela. The narrative captures nearly three centuries of Afro-Brazilian history through the stories of female domestic workers. Alves Cruz spent five years researching her family's stories ad history since departing from Nigeria. Topics discussed include sexual exploitation, racial violence, and the myth of racial democracy in Brazil. The book earned the author the Oliveira Silveira Literary Award and has been accredited as an essential contribution to Afro-Brazilian literature and storytelling. In 2018, the National Archive and Brown University awarded her with the Thomas Skidmore Award for the novel.

=== O Crime do Cais do Valongo (The Crime of the Valongo Docks) ===
Published in 2018, O Crime do Cais do Valongo is a historical-fiction novel, using a mystery narrative to explore the lasting impacts of slavery in Brazil. The narrative begins in Mozambique and continues in Rio de Janeiro, seen through the lens of two characters, the freed Nuno Alcântara Moutinho and the enslaved Mozambican, Muana Lomué. The book uses the murder of a merchant to explore the brutal legacy of slavery in Brazil, mainly set in the Cais do Valongo; which is the most significant landing port of enslaved Africans in the Americas. Such a setting symbolizes the erased memories, violence, and social structures that impact Brazil today. It contextualizes history as more than facts, but as something that has lasting effects upon the foundations of Brazilian society. O Crime do Cais do Valongo was recognized as one of "The Best of the Year 2018" by O Globo and is notable in Afro-Brazilian literature as a personification of diverse and historically-marginalized voices.

=== Solitária (Solitary) ===
Published in 2022, Solitária chronicles the story of a young woman living with her mother who serves as a domestic worker in a wealthy apartment complex. The story explores the dynamics between differing classes and races in Brazilian society. Alves Cruz used the narrative as an example of breaking the cycle of poverty and generational relationships. The novel illuminates exploitation and abuse of black women that work in the home as it describes a murder and accident that occurs in the apartment. She has said that the book was meant to serve as a microcosm of Brazil to tell the stories of the marginalized.

=== Nada digo de Ti, que em Ti Não Veja (I Say Nothing of You that I Do Not See in You) ===
Published in 2020, Nada digo de ti, que em ti não veja, is set in 1732, in Rio de Janeiro. The book addresses themes of militia, racism, fake news, denunciation, religious fanaticism, and LGBTQ issues. The book discusses secrets and hypocrisies of two rich colonial families, with a threat to reveal some of their guarded secrets. Alves Cruz introduces a focus on the transsexuality of an enslaved woman, Vitória. Autora connects Brazil's slave-owning past with current societal problems, calling it a story of "impossible love, strong and true".

== Bibliography ==
=== Novels ===
- Água de barrela. Brasília-DF: Fundação Cultural Palmares, 2016. 2. ed. Rio de Janeiro: Malê Editora, 2018.
- O crime do cais do Valongo. Rio de Janeiro: Editora Malê, 2018.
- Nada digo de ti, que em ti não veja. Rio de Janeiro: Pallas Editora, 2020.
- Solitária. São Paulo: Companhia das Letras, 2022.
- Meridiana. São Paulo: Companhia das Letras, 2025.
- Milena e o Pássaro Antigo, 2025.

=== Anthologies ===
- Cadernos Negros 39. Organized by Esmeralda Ribeiro and Márcio Barbosa. São Paulo: Quilombhoje, 2016. (poems).
- Cadernos Negros 40. Organized by Esmeralda Ribeiro and Márcio Barbosa. São Paulo: Quilombhoje, 2017. (short stories).
- Novos poetas. Prêmio Sarau Brasil 2017.
- Ciclo Contínuo Editorial. São Paulo: Ciclo Contínuo, 2018. (short stories).
- A Vestida: Contos. Malê, 2022.
