= Nossa Senhora de Pompéia Hospital =

Brazilian hospital in Caxias do Sul

29°10′3.04″S 51°11′1.05″W

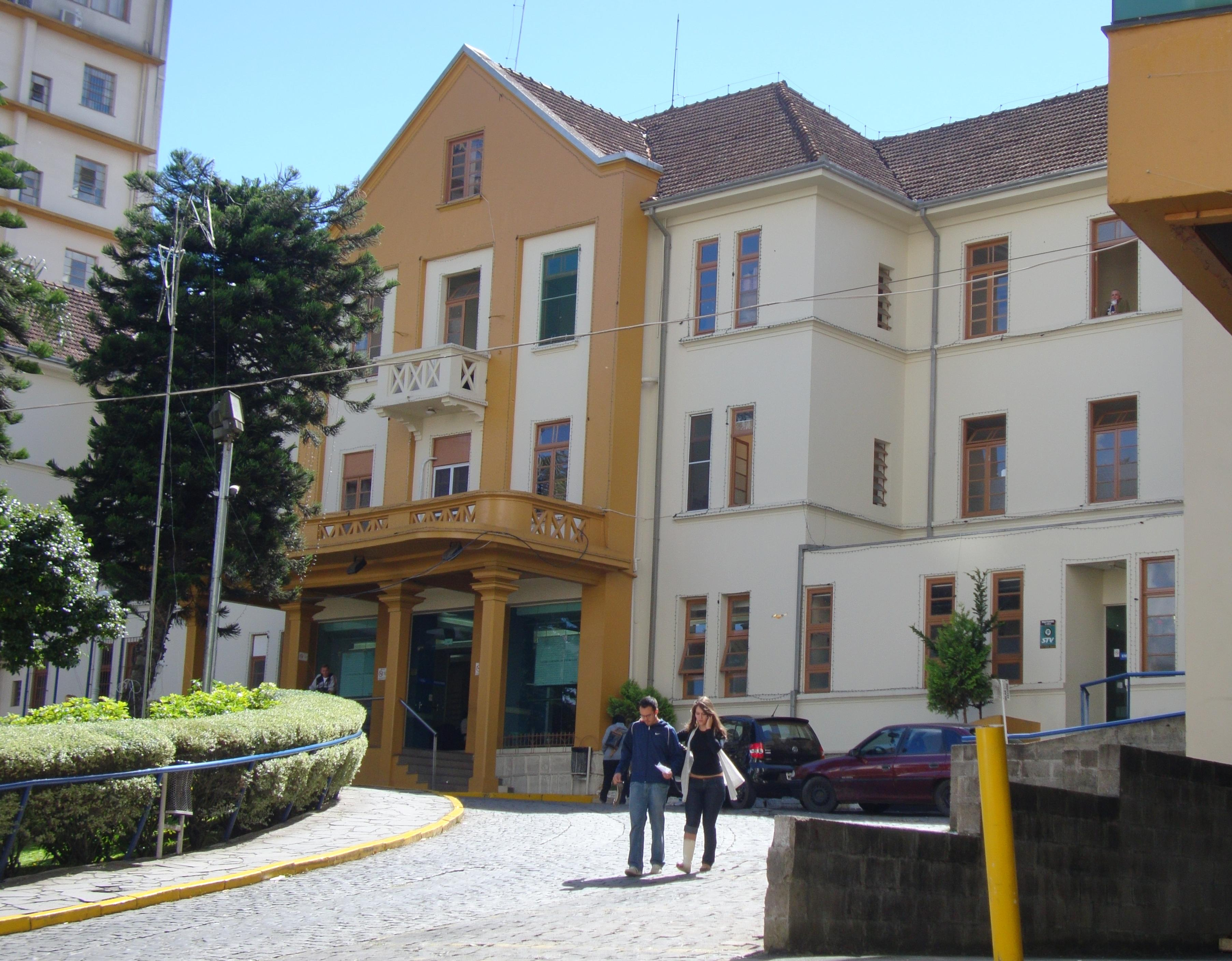
Pompéia Hospital.

The Nossa Senhora de Pompéia Hospital, also known as Pompéia Hospital, is a non-profit philanthropic hospital in Caxias do Sul, Brazil, specialized in many areas and with national coverage.

== History ==
The hospital, which was one of the first in Caxias do Sul, is located on Júlio de Castilhos Avenue and was created through the initiative of a group of ladies who had formed with the purpose of raising funds for the construction of the main altar of the Mother Church. On August 12, 1913, in order to maintain a community work, the Ladies of Charity Association, presided by Ignez Parolini Thompson, decided to focus on the assistance of poor sick people, under the supervision of João Meneguzzi, parish priest of the Mother Church. Initially, the patients were assisted in their homes, but soon it became necessary to organize a hospital. Initially, the Palacete Rosa was purchased and adapted for the function. Shortly afterwards, the Ladies bought the small hospital owned by doctors Cesar Merlo and Henrique Fracasso, and two other houses, all neighboring the Palacete. The new institution was inaugurated on June 24, 1920, and put under the direction of doctor Romulo Carbone, who was very respected in the city, with the Josephine sisters in charge of administration and nursing care. It had capacity for 60 beds, an operating room, a pharmacy, and a consulting room. Low-income patients were treated free of charge, and the wealthy paid modest fees.

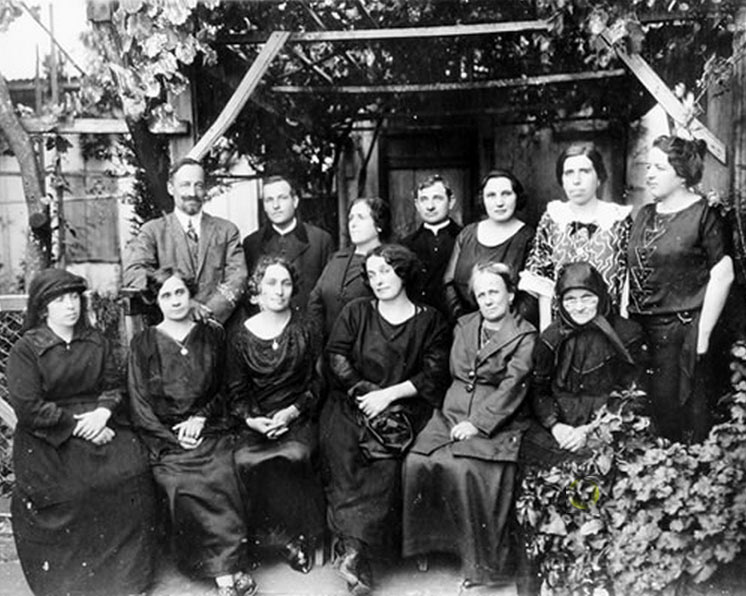
One of the first Directors of the Ladies of Charity.

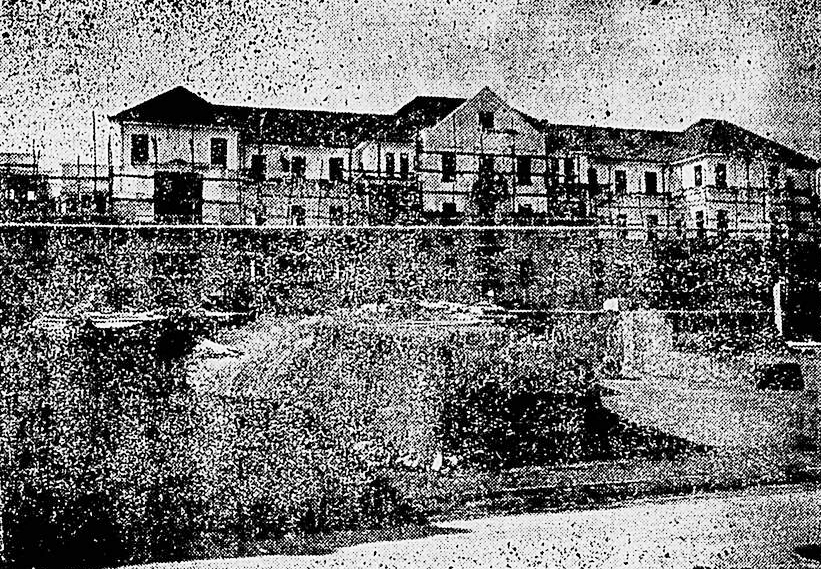
The new building under construction, 1940.

In 1939, there were 3,269 indigent hospitalizations, 30,755 free consultations, 821 complex surgeries, 2,191 simple surgeries, and 375 births. In addition, the hospital sent medicines and aid to sick people in their homes that cost more than 33 contos de réis, and gave clothes to indigent people that cost more than 12 contos de réis. There was also spiritual assistance, since the hospital had a chapel and a chaplain, enabling 138 adults to make their first communion, 81 people to get baptized, and 38 marriages to be performed. The total services provided to indigents had reached a value of more than 119 contos.

The Palacete Rosa functioned as the main block until its facilities became too small for the growing number of attendances. Still in 1939, it was decided to build a new and much larger headquarters, endowed with modern equipment, with a project by the renowned architect Joseph Lutzemberger from Porto Alegre. The new building was inaugurated with great solemnity on December 25, 1940, with the presence of the federal interventor Osvaldo Cordeiro de Farias, the mayor Dante Marcucci, and the blessings of Dom José Barea, bishop of Caxias. In 1949, construction began on a new wing. The Palacete Rosa was used as an annex until the mid-1960s, when it was demolished to make way for a large modern block.

In 1969, the administration was transferred to lay people and a process of professionalization began. However, the institution preserved a philanthropic character, while the Ladies focused on the material and spiritual comfort of the sick and on fundraising, remaining as the funding entity. According to historian Ernesto Brandalise, "only God knows how much charity was done. All the directors were tireless and dedicated a large part of their day to the hospital. [...] Thanks to these Ladies we have, with the support of the ecclesiastic authority, this monument that makes Caxias do Sul proud".

Over the years, the hospital went through financial crises that became worse in the 1980s when the National Social Security Health Care Institute (INAMPS) disaccredited most hospitals in the region, leaving Pompéia as the only one to serve the needy population. As a result, the institution began to face several problems, such as overcrowding, precarious services, and great indebtedness. The situation began to improve at the end of the decade with the admission of a new administration, the St. Camillus Charitable Society, in 1988. In 1997, the hospital obtained the Unified Health System certification.

In 2001, the Amigos do Pompéia (English: Friends of Pompéia) Project was launched, which made it possible to raise a lot of funds and a considerable improvement in service and equipment. The following years saw the inauguration of a new emergency care unit (which received the Bronze Trophy in the Quality Award - RS); an eye bank; the Cancer Institute; the Nephrology Institute; a new ICU, an effluent treatment station, and a medical residency program, besides renovations and improvements in the laboratory, the SUS wing, the emergency room, and the Diagnostic Institute.

== Honors and awards ==
In 2003, the Brazilian Post and Telegraph Corporation released a stamp commemorating the hospital's 90th anniversary. In 2012, the institution received the Dr. Pinotti Award from the Chamber of Deputies for its services in the area of women's health. In 2013, celebrating its centennial, the Pompéia Hospital was the center of festivities and tributes; besides receiving gratitude for services rendered, the institution received the Virvi Ramos Award from the City Council, and praises in the Legislative Assembly and in the Chamber of Deputies. The president of the Ladies of Charity received the Medal of the 53rd Legislature of the Legislative Assembly. The Pioneiro newspaper published a great series of reports recovering its history and pointing out the great services provided to the population. In 2019, its Materials and Sterilization Center received Diamond certification from 3M. In 2022, it was in the 25th position in Newsweek magazine's ranking of the best hospitals in Brazil.

== Hospital structure ==
The Pompéia Hospital is a regional reference center in emergency and high-complexity care, currently serving a population of 1 million people in 48 municipalities. It is recognized as a Teaching Hospital and a member of the Brazilian Association of university and Teaching Hospitals, with a medical residency program in the areas of intensive care medicine, clinical oncology, internal medicine, neurosurgery, general surgery, traumatology, orthopedics, and radiology. The institution, which also offers technical courses and internships, has been recognized by the Ministry of Health as a strategic facility for healthcare in the region. In 2018, 60% of its care occurred in the SUS system. It currently has 300 beds, 13 operating rooms, three adult ICUs and one neonatal ICU, and performs an average of 180,000 outpatient visits, 15,000 surgeries, and 15,000 hospitalizations per year.

== See also ==
- History of Caxias do Sul
- Historic Center of Caxias do Sul
