= Zambelli family =

Italian-Brazilian family

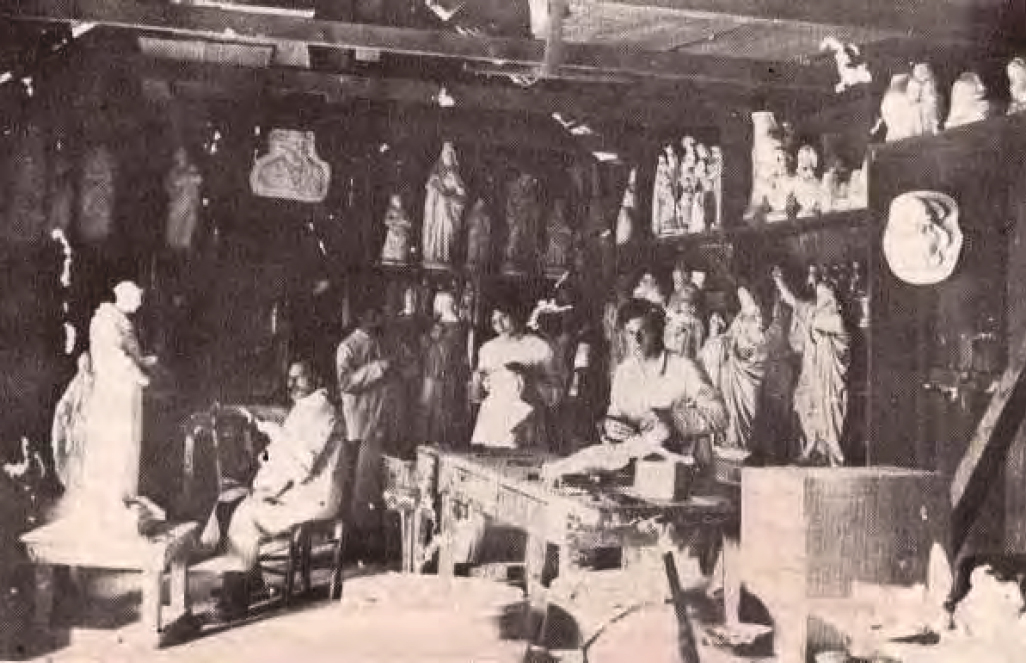
The Zambelli Atelier in 1912. In the photo, from left to right, Tarquinio (seated) and his children Mario, Annunzia and Estacio.

The Zambelli family was formed by Italian-Brazilian artists who lived in Caxias do Sul and dedicated especially to sacred statuary and decoration of temples and residences. The Zambelli became well-known in the Italian-settled region of Rio Grande do Sul, founding a popular and long-lasting artistic tradition.

== Tarquinio Zambelli ==
Tarquinio Zambelli, born on September 8, 1857, in Canneto sull'Oglio, province of Mantua, in Italy, was the fifth generation of a family of artists. He was the son of a carver named Angelo, about whom practically nothing is known. At only 16, he graduated from the School of Fine Arts in Milan, in statuary, wood carving, painting, decoration, and other courses.

He founded the Zambelli line of sculptors and decorators in Brazil. At the age of 24, having already achieved some fame in his homeland, he married Rosa Pizzon and, in 1883, moved to Brazil at the suggestion of his sister Adelaide, who already lived in Caxias do Sul and was married to an engineer who opened roads in the region.

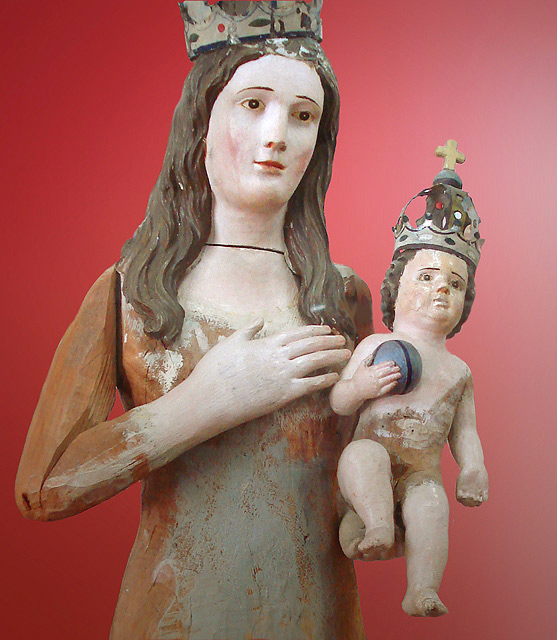
Tarquinio Zambelli: Our Lady of Mercy, 1885, one of his first works. Municipal Museum of Caxias do Sul.

Tarquinio and Rosa Pizzon had five children. The oldest, Michelangelo, was also born in Canneto sull'Oglio, while Annunzia, Mario Cilo, Estacio Frederico, and Raffaele Enrico were born in Caxias do Sul, in Brazil. In 1916, Tarquinio, who had been widowed, married again to Carmela Troian Zambelli, and from this union Edmundo Valentin, Angelo Raphael and Americo were born.

Despite his qualified training, Tarquinio did not find good working conditions in the colony. His early works, rustic and small in size, reflect this precariousness. In addition, the market was very small, limited almost exclusively to devotional statuary for a small and mostly poor public. However, in a few years, he already had a large clientele throughout the region, and was able to support his large family in relative comfort, as evidenced by photographs showing him and his family in fashionable clothes.

He mastered a multiplicity of techniques, as stated in the advertisement of his studio, which he called Grande Laboratório Artístico (English: Great Artistic Laboratory), suggesting, as Nátali Lazzari thinks, an inquisitive nature and an emphasis on technique. In the laboratory, Tarquínio transferred his artistic knowledge to his children like a grand master. He designed some chapels and carried out their internal decoration, participated in several art salons in the state and in Brazil, and was awarded in all of them, most of the times with a gold medal. Through his family relations in Italy, he sent works to art contests, and also received awards there, but there is no record of which works he would have presented on these occasions.

Tarquínio concentrated his activities in the northeast of Rio Grande do Sul, in the area where Italian settlers established themselves. Among his main works are the group of Our Lady of the Rosary of Pompeii with Saint Dominic and Saint Catherine of Siena, originally intended for the Minor Basilica of Our Lady of Sorrows, and the Dead Christ of the Cathedral of Caxias do Sul. His most striking piece, however, a life-size Pietà with Jesus dead in his arms, of intense drama, was not finished. After a productive career, Tarquinio died on July 17, 1934. In his honor, his name was given to a street in Caxias do Sul. He was, as Athos Damasceno Ferreira states, perhaps the most prolific sacred sculptor in the state, creating a tradition of great acceptance and longevity. Other authors, such as Lazzari, João Spadari Adami, and Luís de Boni, place him in a privileged position, seeing in him the most important carver of the Italian colonial region.

== Michelangelo Zambelli ==
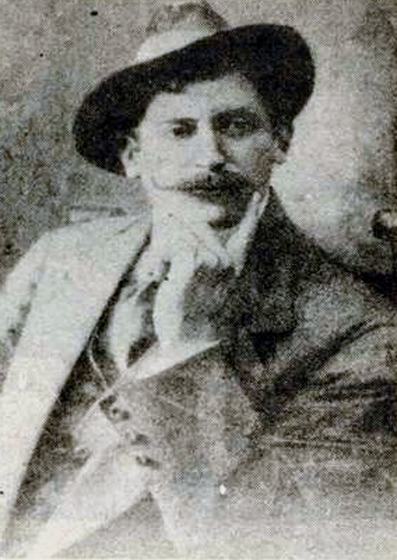
Michelangelo Zambelli.

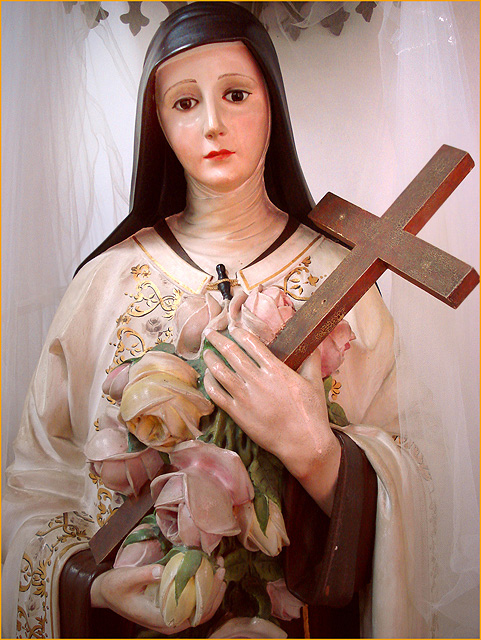
Michelangelo Zambelli: Saint Thérèse of Lisieux, Municipal Museum of Caxias do Sul.

Among Tarquinio's sons, Michelangelo was the most famous. Born in Italy on August 26, 1882, in Canneto sull'Oglio, he learned the first elements of the craft from his father. He was sent to Porto Alegre to study at the Nossa Senhora do Rosário School, and after finishing elementary school, he returned to Caxias. When Tarquinio realized that his son was really talented, he sent him, at the age of 16, to improve himself in Italy, staying with relatives and entering the Brera Academy in Milan, where he specialized in modeling, decoration, and art applied to industry. He participated in the decoration of some palaces, made some busts, and surrounded himself with a circle of illustrated friends with whom he kept up a lifelong correspondence.

Michelangelo returned to Caxias do Sul briefly, at the age of 21, but realizing the limitations of the local art market, he soon moved on to the state capital, where he hoped to find more favorable conditions. There, he developed intense activity, creating works for churches, schools, clubs, residences, and public spaces. Wishing to expand his knowledge even more, he traveled, together with his brothers Estacio and Mario, to Buenos Aires, where he deepened his studies and participated in the decoration of the Teatro Colón, besides undertaking other works, holding exhibitions and directing a company, the Atelier de Escultura P. Piedra Arenistica.

Ten years later, Michelangelo returned to Caxias do Sul, married Adelina Stangherlin, his fiancée since childhood and daughter of Pietro Stangherlin, Tarquinio's former rival, and established a studio on Julio de Castilhos Avenue around 1914, where he also kept a drawing school. Since then he has produced a multitude of secular and sacred pieces, specializing in the latter. He followed the conventional patterns for hagiographic representation, producing mainly plaster pieces destined for multiplication through molds. Many of them are delicately expressive, and the copies are usually hand-painted and very well finished.

His studio became famous not only in the city, but in the entire region of Italian colonization, both for its statues and for the decoration of churches, chapels, and residences. Some of his most interesting works are the statues of Our Lady of Sorrows and Our Lord of the Steps, in the Chapel of the Holy Sepulchre, the image of Saint Thérèse of Lisieux, today in the Municipal Museum of Caxias do Sul, and the statue of Liberty, which is installed in the Dante Alighieri Square, on an ornamental column by Silvio Toigo. In Caxias do Sul, he received a diploma of honor to merit, nine gold medals and three silver medals in local exhibitions, and collaborated in the elaboration of the project for the Church of San Pellegrino. In Porto Alegre, he participated in artistic contests.

His wife Adelina helped him in his artistic production, taking responsibility for painting the statues. After Michelangelo's death, on April 10, 1940, Adelina took over the studio and carried it on together with her partner Nilo Tomasi. At this time, Ludovina Valesca Reis took over the creation of the statuary, employing several assistants, among them Mário Spiandorello, André Schiavo, and Nadyr dalle Molle. Adelina died on September 20, 1994, Ludovina retired in 2003, and by this time the studio was in decline. The following year, without an assured leadership, the studio closed its doors, after having populated the entire region with images. Part of the remaining collection was dispersed, but about a thousand pieces, among statues, molds and tools, were acquired by the Festa Nacional da Uva S.A., which set up a museum in his memory, the Zambelli Atelier Memorial, in its exhibition park.

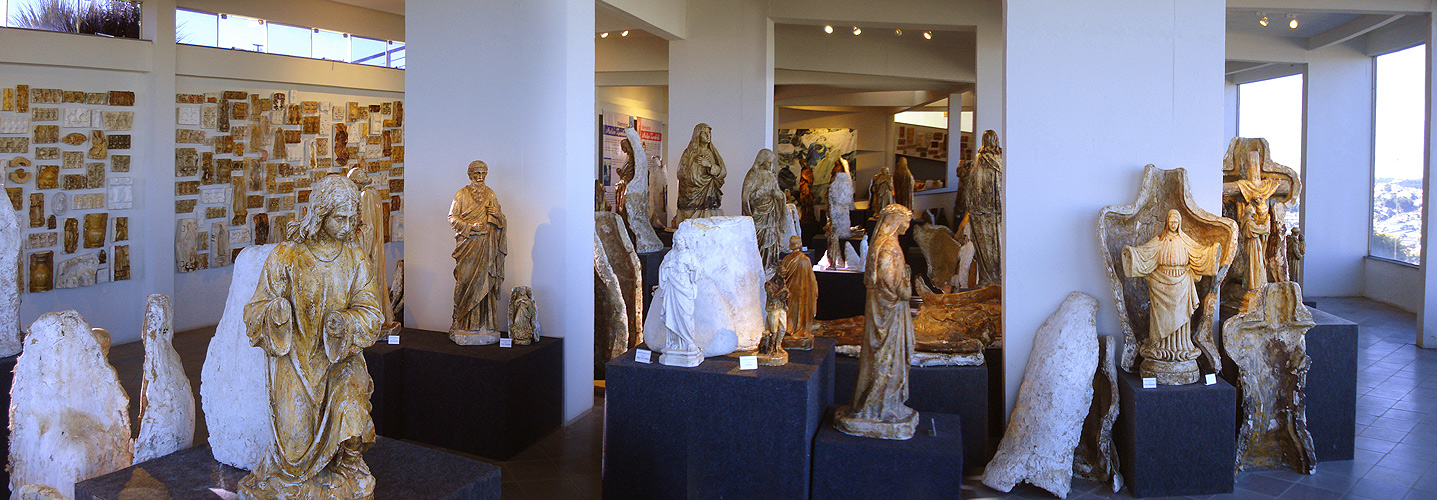
View of the interior of the Zambelli Atelier Memorial.

== Mário Cilo Zambelli ==
Mário was born on October 23, 1892, in Caxias do Sul, and since he was a child, he showed talent for sculpture, being trained by his father. Following the example of his brother Michelangelo, he also traveled to Europe in search of improvement, studying in France and Italy, specializing in funerary art and building decoration. When he returned to Brazil, he accompanied his brothers to Buenos Aires, also collaborating in the decoration of the Colón Theater and other buildings, taking the opportunity of contact with famous masters to refine his knowledge of scale models, drawing, and modeling.

Returning to Caxias do Sul, he found the market dominated by his father and his brothers Michelangelo and Estácio, and had to look elsewhere for sustenance. Therefore, he moved to Pernambuco, where he remained for ten years, conquering a large clientele. Later, he decided to return to the south, settling in Vacaria, where he set up a workshop that employed several assistants and served the entire region. The engraved tombstones, with an exquisite decorative style full of floral motifs in intricate and meticulous interlacing, are the highlights of his production. There, he also dedicated himself to architecture, creating the design of several residences and temples in an eclectic style. In this field, his greatest work is the building of the Commerce Club. He married Otacília Maria de Lima in Vacaria, and had a son, Adão Zambelli. Mário died in the same city on October 28, 1948.

== Estácio Frederico Zambelli ==
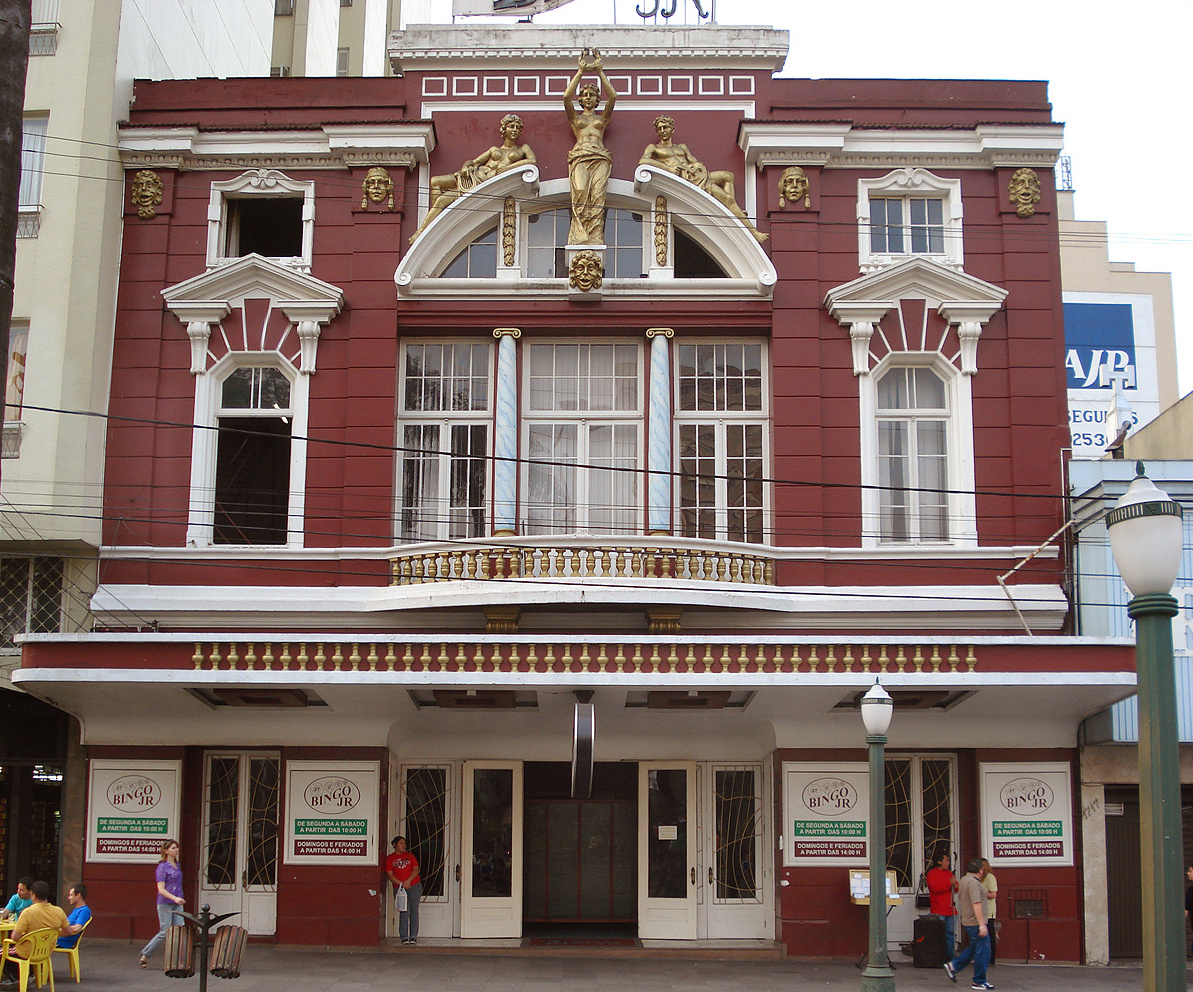
Old Cine Central. The sculptural decoration of the facade is by Estacio Zambelli.

Estácio was born on April 3, 1896, in Caxias do Sul, and died there on March 10, 1967. Like his brothers, he learned his first sculpture lessons from his father. At the age of 14, saddened by the death of his mother, he began working professionally. Later, he traveled to Europe several times to further his studies through short and intensive courses, and became interested in researching new materials. He traveled extensively, seeking to see ancient monuments. Back home, he opened his own sculpture studio while maintaining an importing and trading business for a variety of items, from motorcycles to pressure cookers, as well as objects of worship.

He dedicated himself to sacred statuary in wood and plaster, working with great ease and speed, despite being color-blind, which required him to ask for frequent help from other people when painting the statues. He also amateurishly developed painting, following a conservative style, and showed considerable skill on the violin. His studio became successful and catered to a good portion of the local art market, exporting pieces even to the Northeast region. Around 1947, the studio burned down, destroying all its equipment and collection, leaving it in difficult financial conditions and forcing a drastic reduction in its activities.

Among his many works are the statues of the Maria Bambina, St. Agnes, and the crucified Christ, all in the Cathedral of Caxias do Sul, the sculptural decoration on the facade of the old Cine Central, and the Via Crucis in relief and images on the altar of the Church of Our Lady of Lourdes.

== Raffaele Zambelli ==
Raffaele was the youngest son of Tarquinio's first marriage, and was born on March 15, 1899, in Caxias do Sul. He was also introduced to sculpture by his father and later traveled to Buenos Aires to further his knowledge of the technique. He then moved to Rio de Janeiro, and from there to Italy, serving in the Italian army as a sergeant, becoming a prisoner of war and being sent to Langensalz, Germany, where he died on March 2, 1918, from pneumonia. Although he trained as a sculptor, there is no record of any of his remaining works.

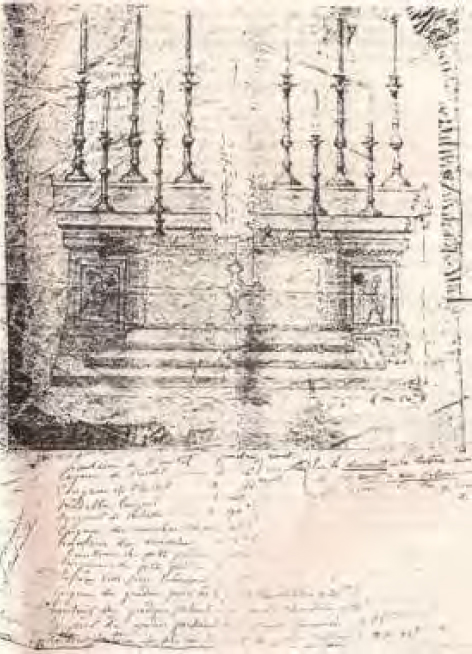
Tarquinio Zambelli: project of altar, early 20th century.

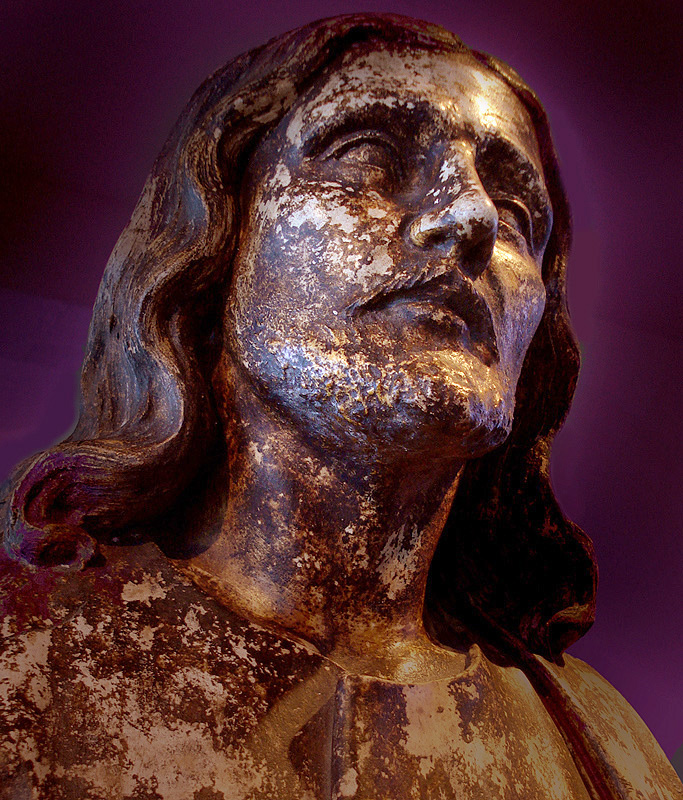
Michelangelo Zambelli: Detail of a Jesus, Zambelli Atelier Memorial.

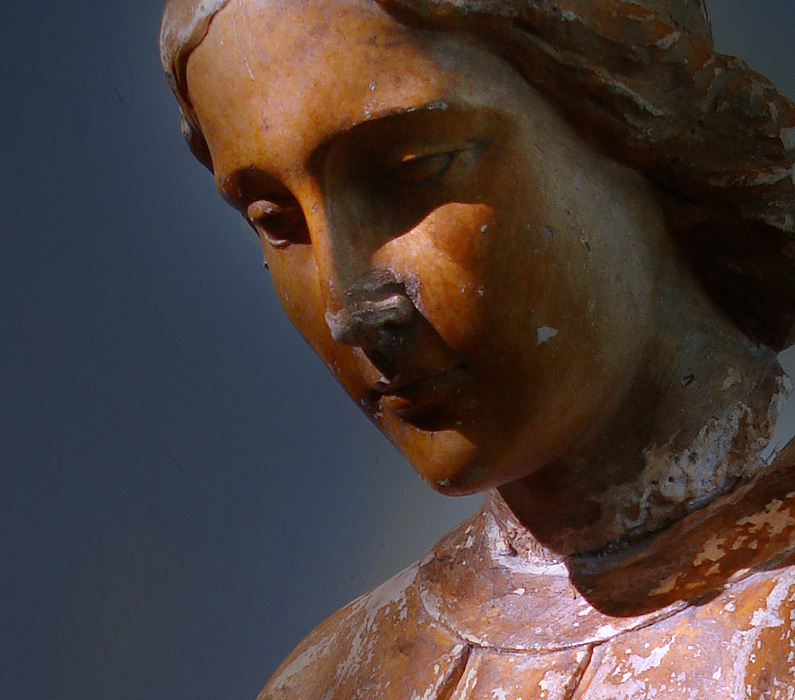
Michelangelo Zambelli: Detail of a guardian angel, mould statue for serial reproduction, Zambelli Atelier Memorial.

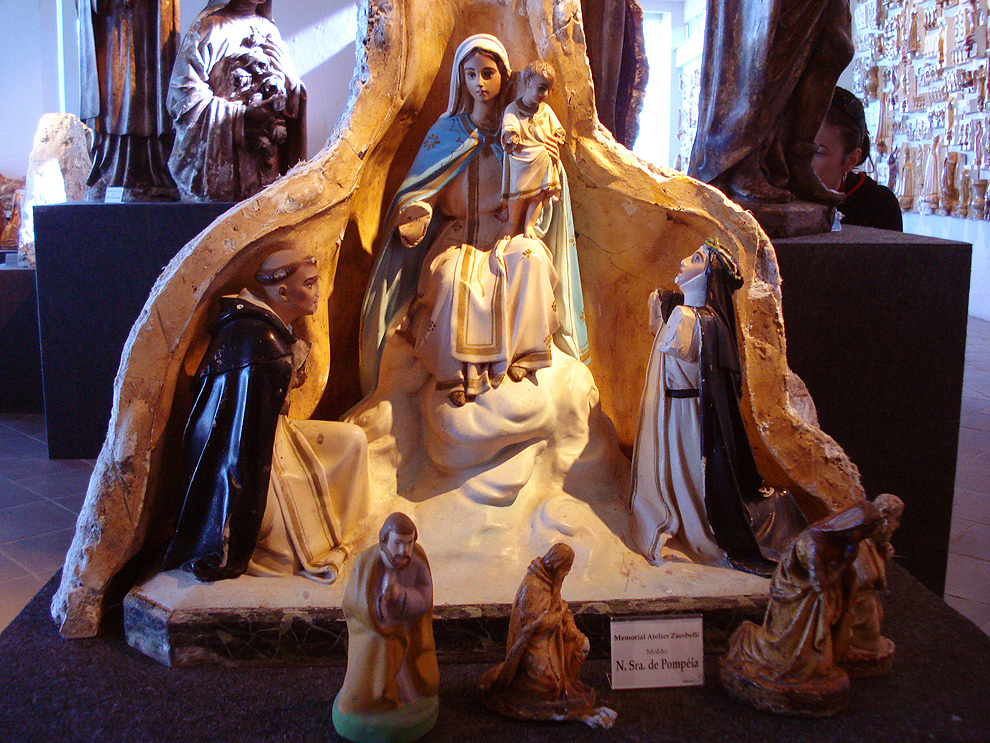
Michelangelo Zambelli: Unfinished group of Our Lady of Pompeii and saints, Zambelli Atelier Memorial.
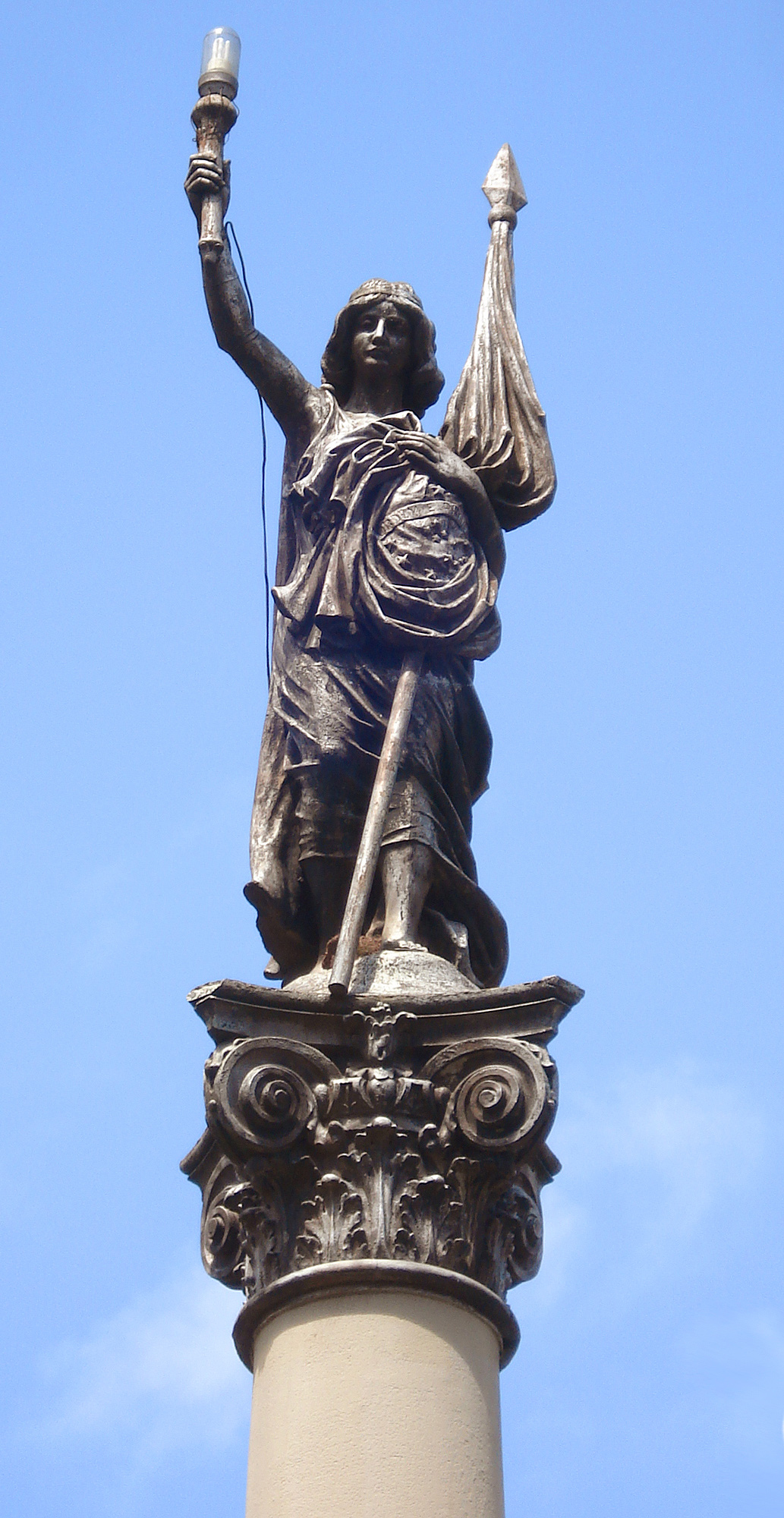
Michelangelo Zambelli: Statue of Liberty, Dante Alighieri Square, Caxias do Sul.

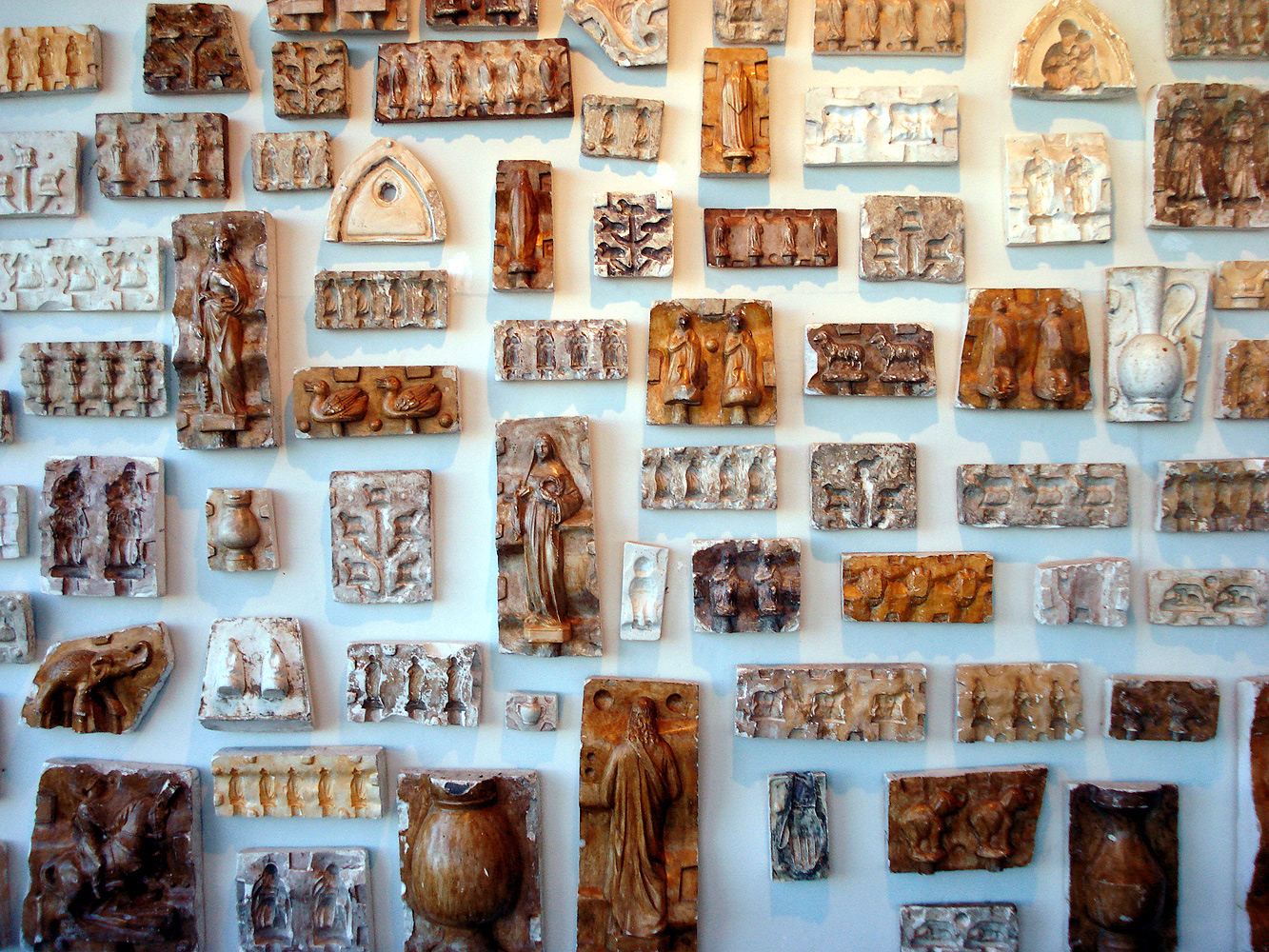
Molds used for the reproduction of statues and other items, at the Zambelli Atelier Memorial.

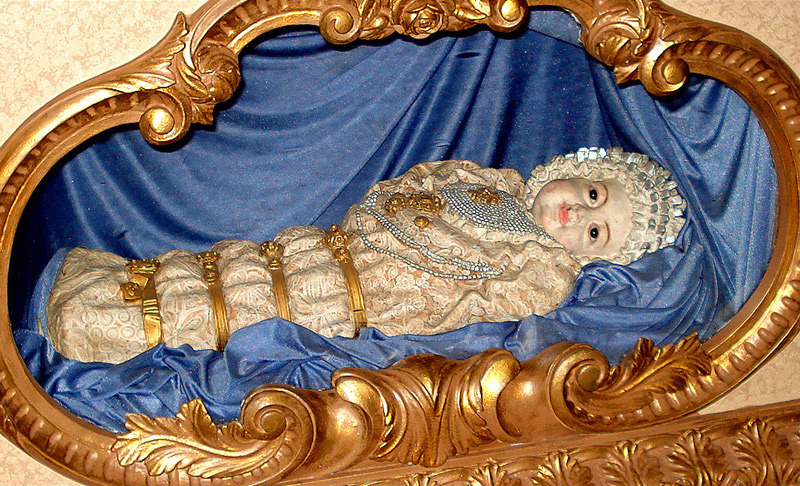
Estacio Zambelli: Maria Bambina. Cathedral of Caxias do Sul.

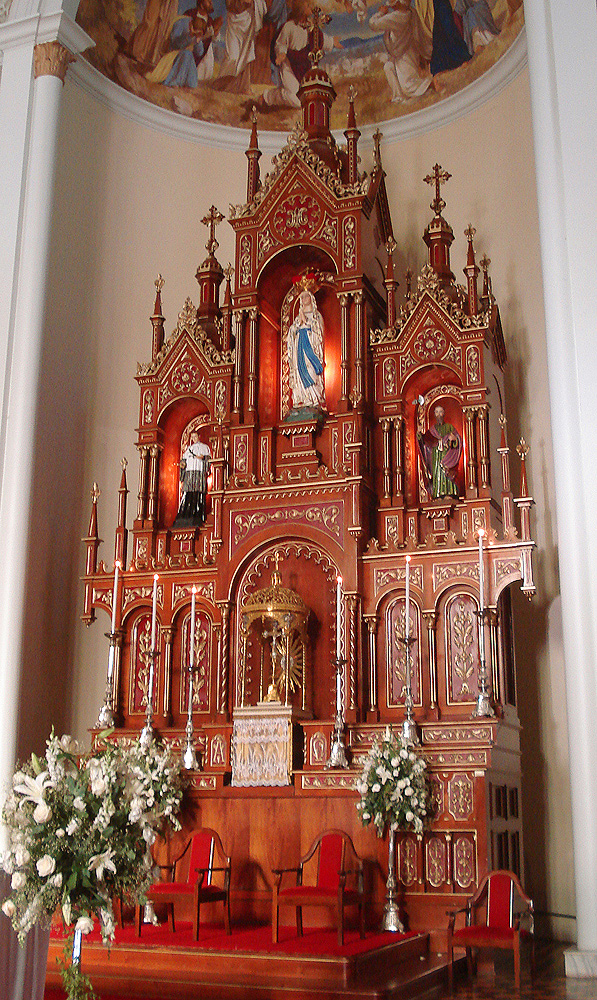
Estácio Zambelli: statue at the main altar of the Church of Our Lady of Lourdes, Caxias do Sul.

== See also ==
- History of Caxias do Sul
- Brazilian sculpture
