= João Spadari Adami Municipal Historical Archive =

Brazilian Institution

- Arquivo Histórico Maunicipal João Spadari Adami
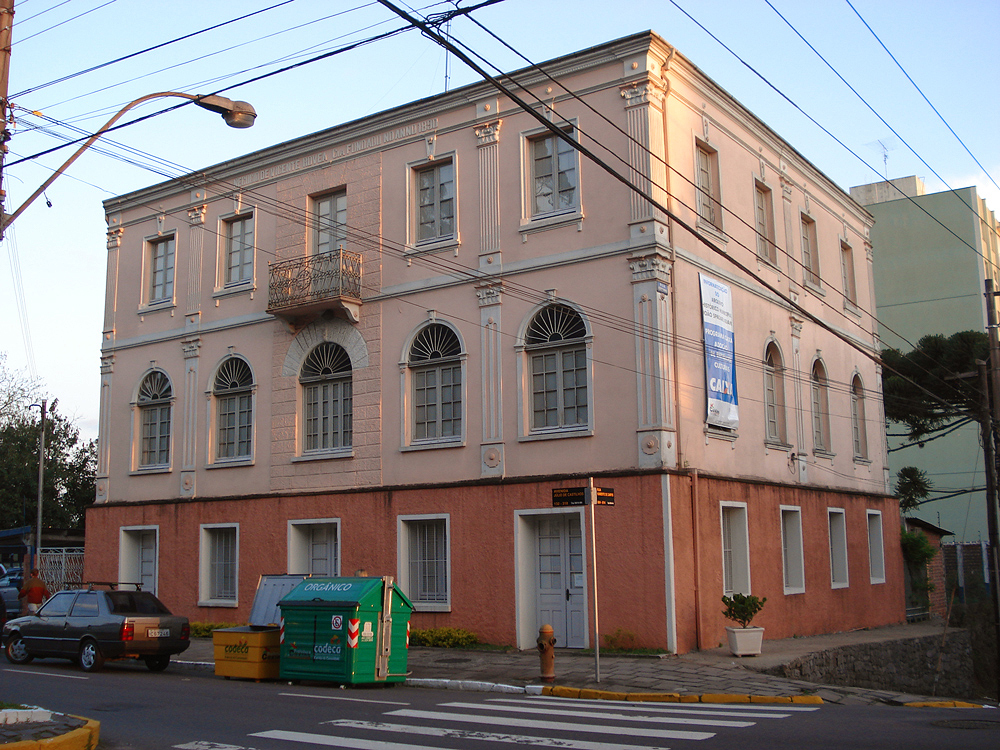
- Location: Caxias do Sul, Rio Grande do Sul; Brazil
- Coordinates: 29°10′3.76″S 51°9′52.711″W
- Website: Official website

The João Spadari Adami Municipal Historical Archive (Portuguese: Arquivo Histórico Municipal João Spadari Adami) is a cultural institution in Caxias do Sul, Brazil. It has a large collection of documents, photographs, films, recordings, newspapers, and other materials, mostly related to the Italian colonization in the region and to the history of Caxias do Sul, whose value and extent place the institution as an important reference in the state.

The Archive was created in 1976 as a department of the Municipal Museum, and for many years remained installed in very precarious conditions at the back of the Museum. It soon gathered a large collection and began to perform relevant activities. In 1979, a movement began for the transfer of the Municipal Archive to its own headquarters, which only took place between 1996 and 1997; in 1998 it gained administrative autonomy. The historic building, the former residence and business of Vicente Rovea, located at 318 Júlio de Castilhos Avenue, is protected by IPHAE and by the City Hall.

== History ==
A Municipal Archive already existed in Caxias from the time of the village's emancipation in 1890, to preserve administrative documentation. In 1919, when the intendant José Pena de Moraes reorganized the public services, he determined that the Archive should systematically collect "the books and papers of all the administration departments, according to their importance". During the Grape Festival in 1950, which would celebrate the 75 years of Italian immigration, historian João Spadari Adami was called by the City Hall to select, from the collection of documents in the Municipal Archive, those of historical interest to be displayed in the exhibition pavilion. Over time, much of the material from this first Archive was lost, deteriorated or deliberately destroyed.

In 1974, during the reactivation process of the Municipal Museum, a public campaign to reconstitute its collection was launched, and documents were also received. At the same time, during the transfer of the City Hall to a new headquarters to make room for the Museum, a large amount of documentation from the Municipal Archive was about to be incinerated, but a research group led by Loraine Slomp Giron alerted museologist Maria Frigeri Horn, coordinator of the Museum team, which made it possible to save the material and incorporate it into the collection. Therefore, it became necessary to create a specific department for the custody and administration of this valuable material; in early 1975, the creation of a Historical Archive was already planned. In March 1976, another large volume of historical documents, maps, research, photographs and books was donated to the Museum by the Immigration Centennial Commission.

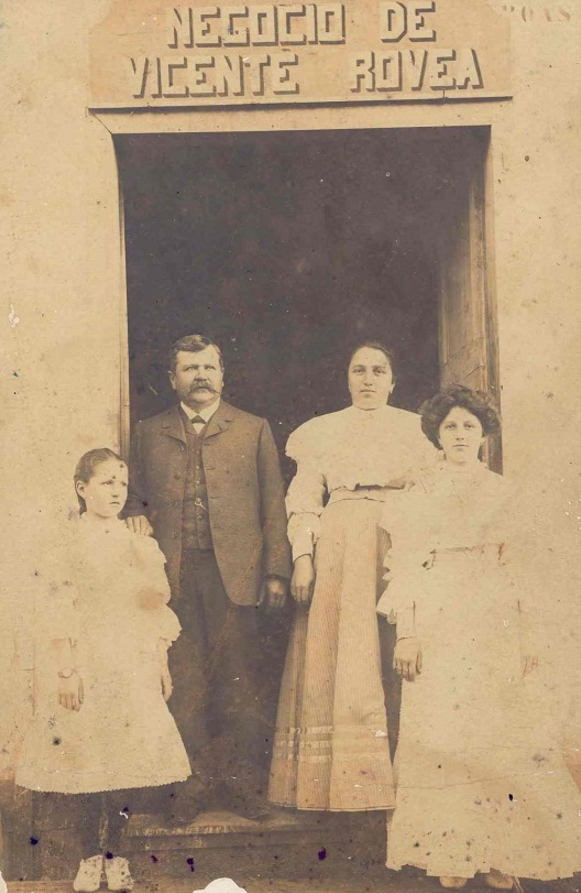
Vicente Rovea and his family at the door of their home. Historical Archive Collection.

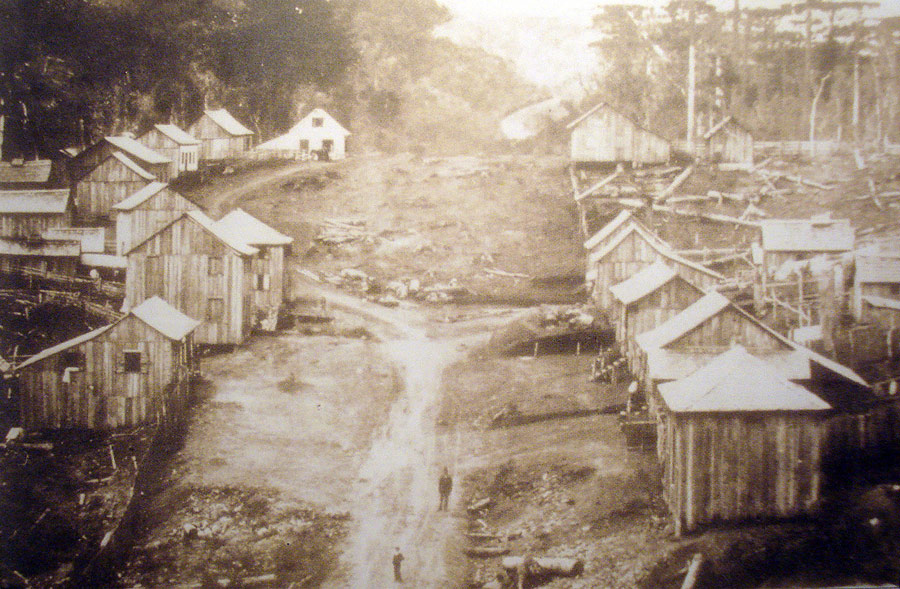
Caxias do Sul at the beginning of settlement. Historical Archive Collection.

In mid-June 1976, Mayor Mário Vanin sent a bill to the City Council for the creation of the Municipal Historical Archive, which was approved, and on August 5, 1976, Decree No. 4047 officially created the institution. However, it was installed in a small wooden house at the back of the Museum, where it operated in extremely precarious conditions. In practice, the Archive was a department of the Museum and both institutions had the same director. In 1978, in partnership with the University of Caxias do Sul, the Museum started to organize the Archive, when the need for its own headquarters became evident. In this phase the following sectors were defined: 1) Documents, with items coming from the former Intendency, the City Hall, the Judiciary, private collections (with emphasis on João Spadari Adami's large collection), companies, schools, and other institutions and organs, including correspondence, music scores, legislation, official acts, budgets, processes, telegrams, balances, bids, requests, etc.; 2) Printed matter, including newspapers, pamphlets and books, and a library on the theme of immigration; 3) Cartography, with maps and floor plans; 4) Photography. In March 1979, the Museum's first major exhibition was organized with material from the Archive, consisting of photographs.

In the meantime, a debate began about the fate of Vicente Rovea's old house and business, a property of great historical value built in 1890, which by then was already very degraded and with its demolition scheduled for June 1979. Faced with the imminent threat, the director of the Archive, Juventino dal Bó, led a movement for its conservation and the transfer of the Archive to the historic building. The City Hall was called to intervene but claimed not to have the resources to buy the property. Legally, it was also difficult to protect it, because there was not yet a conservation law in the city. The movement had great repercussion and received the support of the influential Chamber of Industry and Commerce. A group of businessmen acquired the mansion and made it available to the community for cultural use, but the definitive solution would still take many years.

In 1980, the Archive began publishing the periodical Boletim Informativo. In this year, its collection already had about 300 thousand documents, and the process of cataloguing was beginning. New donations continued to be received and actively sought. Throughout this decade, the Archive developed relevant activity, despite its poor conditions, offering courses, participating in congresses and seminars, promoting exhibitions and fostering research, becoming a reference in the state.

The Rovea house passed into the possession of the City Hall in 1985, and was listed by the Institute of Historic and Artistic Heritage of the State of Rio Grande do Sul on December 23, 1986, with a restoration project budgeted at 3 million cruzeiros and expected to last three years, sponsored by the City Hall and the Ministry of Culture. The repair was delayed, and by 1989 part of the material from the Archive was already stored in the house, but in a state of abandonment since the doors had no locks and the property was constantly invaded by beggars and depredated by vandals. According to a report by councilwoman Geni Peteffi, the recovery of the building was urgent, because the conditions of the Archive were terrible and the documentation was threatened by the rain that infiltrated the place. In December the works were resumed; by 1990 the internal part was ready and the external part was beginning to be changed.

About to occupy the building, the Archive was prevented by a fire in the Education Secretariat, which had to be installed in the Rovea house in 1992, remaining there until 1996. The following year, the space was finally released for the Archive, which was installed in a still precarious way. The previous reform did not develop as planned; the electrical network foreseen in the project was replaced by cheaper material, the lighting was not installed either, and the furniture used was the one that was already in the old headquarters. The spaces were also not well suited, and the structure of the upper floors was not prepared to support the immense weight of the large documentary material accumulated up to that time. In 1997, a bill that added the name of historian João Spadari Adami to the official denomination of the institution, due to his important contribution to the rescue and preservation of local history, was approved. In 1998, the Archive was disconnected from the Municipal Museum by Municipal Law no. 5026 of December 29, and in this same year, a project for a new reform had already started in order to meet the needs of the institution, forcing the transfer of the collection to an annex building. The renovation was completed in late 1999, and the inauguration took place on December 7. By then, the collection had already grown to 700 thousand documents, about 90 thousand photographs and negatives, 15 thousand prints, a special library with 300 titles, an oral memory bank with 400 recordings, and a library. The headquarters was declared a City Heritage Site in 2002.

== Collection ==
The Historical Archive houses a vast documentary collection, encompassing photographs, manuscripts, and official documents, as well as an oral memory bank, books, and other items. The collection has around 500 thousand documents of public origin, 500 thousand of private origin, 600 recorded depositions, 5 thousand books, 300 periodicals, and more than 300 thousand photographs. It is a reference institution, particularly for having the most important collection on Italian immigration in southern Brazil. In addition to the collection, the institution engages in research projects and maintains a number of publications that can be accessed online. In 2022, the collection was organized as follows:

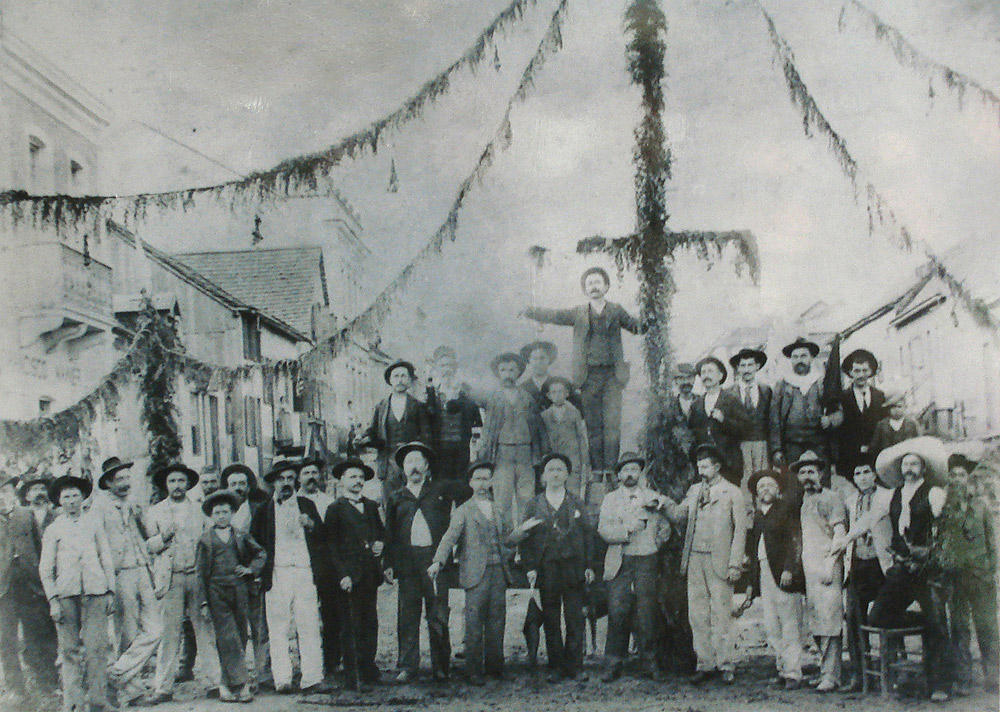
New Year's Eve Celebrations, 1899–1900.

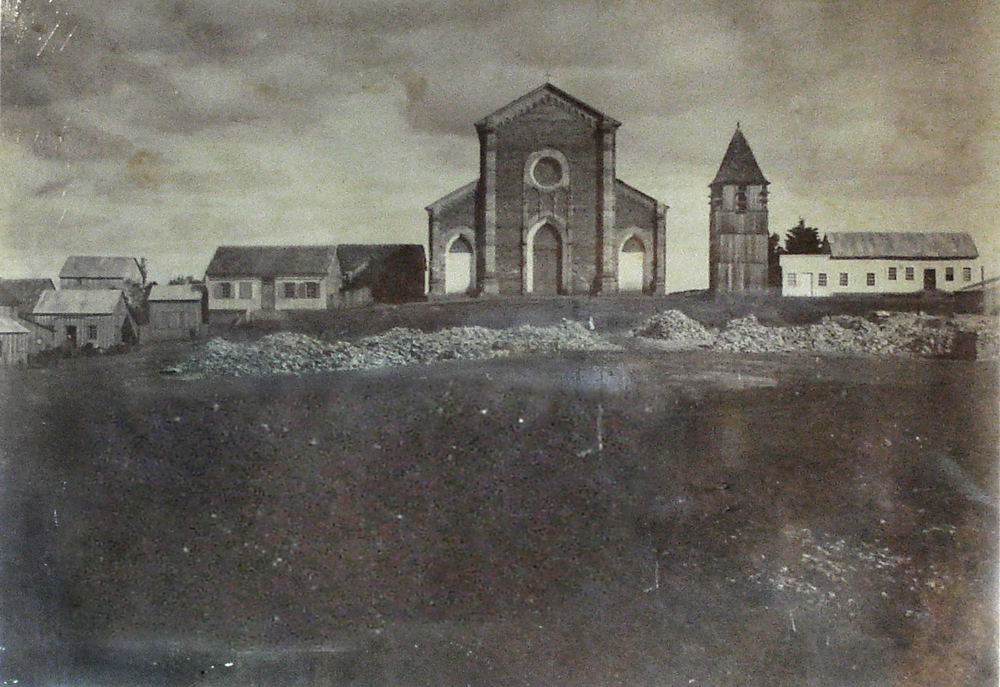
St. Theresa's Cathedral, in Caxias do Sul.

- Public Archive, with official documentation of public origin from the old Board of Directors of the Caxias Colony, the Commission for the Measurement of Lands and Lots, the board of directors and City Council, and the City Council archives, constituting a large body of laws, acts, letters, architectural and urban plans and projects, administrative processes, tax records, among other items, covering the period from 1875 to the present day.
- Private Archives, consisting of documents from families, companies and associations, with letters, business books, sheet music, school notebooks, diplomas, advertisements, albums, postcards, drawings, labels, posters, etc. This unit includes iconographic material, with photographs, slides, negatives and thousands of pieces that portray the city's urban and rural landscape, as well as characters in their habits and customs. Among the most important items in the archive are the collections of the photographer Júlio Calegari and of the Eberle, Braghiroli, Paternoster, Guimarães, Spadari Adami, Bergmann, Zatti, and Ramos families, among others. It also has the 100 thousand negatives from the photography studio of Ulysses Geremia, who documented the city's physiognomy and its transformations over several decades. The photographic collection is the most important in the region and is nationally recognized.
- Oral Memory Bank, which preserves recordings of narratives about local and regional history, and about the population's daily activities.
- Collection of films of public and private origin, with emphasis on themes such as the Grape Festival, immigration, administration, and private life, among others.
- Special library, integrated by periodicals that circulated in Caxias do Sul from its beginnings until nowadays. Among the main newspaper collections are O Caxiense, the first one published in the city (1897); Città di Caxias (1915–1922), in Italian; Correio Riograndense, from 1909 to the present day, and Pioneiro, from 1948 to the present day. Magazines, bulletins and leaflets are also part of this section.
- Library, organized to provide subsidies to researchers with works related to the Italian immigration, the history of Caxias do Sul and subjects related to the documentary collection.

== See also ==
- Caxias do Sul
- History of Caxias do Sul
