= Municipal Museum of Caxias do Sul =

Museum in Rio Grande do Sul, Brazil

- Museu Municipal de Caxias do Sul
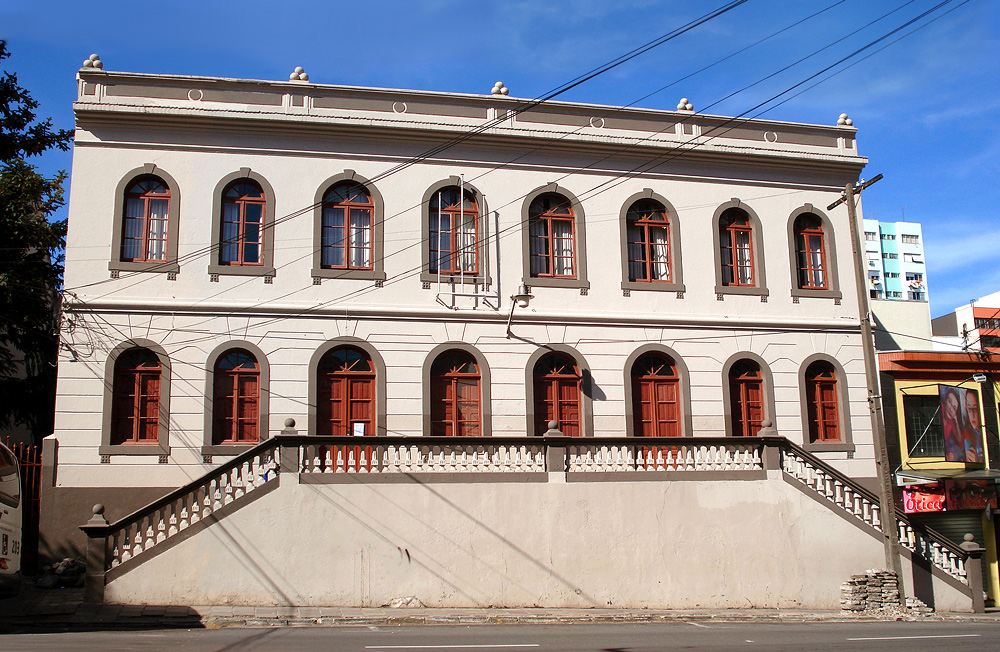
- Facade of the museum

- Location within Brazil
- Location: Rio Grande do Sul; Brazil
- Coordinates: 29°9′59.25″S 51°10′52.115″W
- Type: Historical, Artistic and Ethnographic

The Municipal Museum of Caxias do Sul (Portuguese: Museu Municipal de Caxias do Sul) is a Brazilian historical, artistic, and ethnographic museum, located at 586 Visconde de Pelotas Street, in Caxias do Sul, in the state of Rio Grande do Sul.

The municipal museum, besides permanently showing its own collection, offers monitored visits, a temporary exhibition room, itinerant exhibitions, and several heritage education projects.

== History ==
The Municipal Museum of Caxias do Sul was created along with the Municipal Public Library under Municipal Decree No. 2 of October 3, 1947, by intendant Demétrio Niederauer. The two institutions were inaugurated on November 13 and opened to visitors on December 20 of the same year, with the intendant himself as director. For many years the museum and library functioned in a big house in front of the Dante Alighieri square, but the space available for exhibitions was very limited.

The collection has grown without a defined criterion and has accumulated a quantity of irrelevant pieces. In 1965, a campaign was launched to merge the museum of the Centro de Tradições Gaúchas Rincão da Lealdade with the Municipal Museum and make it a historical museum only, discarding its natural history collections and everything that had no historical interest. The idea caused controversy and was refuted by Demetrio Niederaurer, who considered the natural history section important as a didactic instrument.

The headquarters was demolished in 1967, and the museum's collection was transferred to the Rincão da Lealdade, when most of the pieces were lost. The museum remained forgotten until 1974, when, during the preparations for the centennial celebrations of Italian immigration, scheduled for 1975, the community's attention turned to it. For its reopening it was necessary to find a new headquarters; the old Morandi Otolini family mansion was chosen. The building, built in 1884 and expanded with an additional floor in 1893, was put up for auction in 1894 and acquired by the Municipal Government for 3.62 contos de réis, initially serving as a prison, school, and police station. In 1919, the Municipal Government was installed in the old mansion, where it remained until 1974. At that time the building was completely overpopulated, as it housed almost all municipal offices. It was then decided that the City Hall would be transferred to the large pavilion where the Grape Festival exhibitions were held.

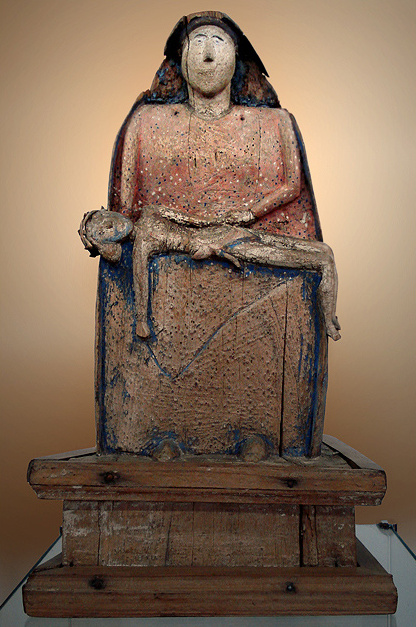
19th century rustic Pietà, one of the most iconic pieces in the collection.

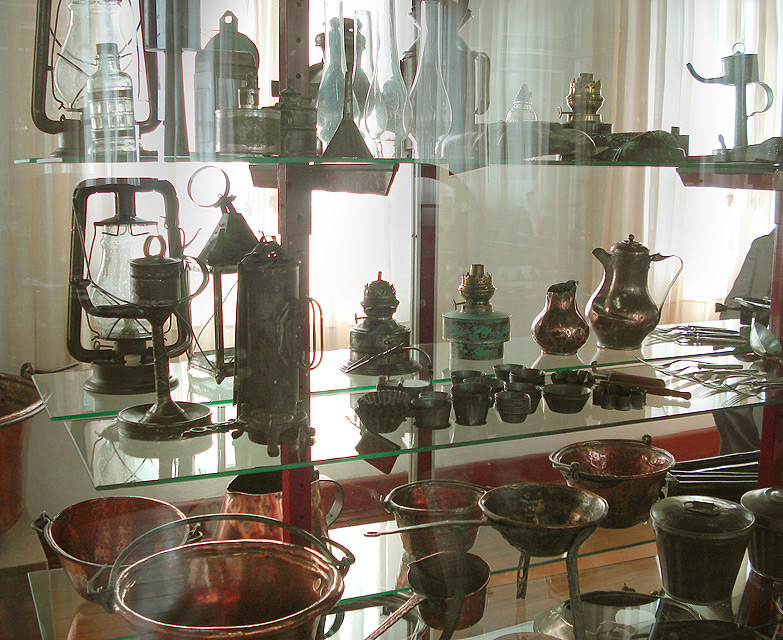
Old copper objects.

In 1974, the museum began the transfer process. Under the coordination of museologist Maria Frigeri Horn, the museum organized a permanent exhibition room, a 19th-century room, a 20th-century room, a furniture room, a sacred art room, and room for temporary exhibitions, in addition to administrative spaces and others for various events. A public campaign was launched in the press to collect donations to reconstitute the dispersed archive. In early 1975, the creation of the Municipal Historical Archive was already planned, to operate in the same premises as the museum.

When it reopened on March 2, 1975, the collection had about 500 pieces and Maria Horn as its first director. In June, the museum inaugurated a new section, the Aldo Locatelli Pinacoteca, initially destined to receive works by artists from Caxias do Sul, and shortly afterwards a section for films, photographs and recordings, and an audiovisual room were created. The renovated institution was well received by the community and soon showed significant visitation. In addition, the institution organized various events, supervised the activities of the Museu Casa de Pedra, as well as continuing to receive new donations. On August 5, 1976, the Historical Archive was officially created, being installed in a small wooden house in the back of the Museum, where the conditions were extremely precarious. The Archive became a department of the museum and in fact the two institutions functioned as one, with the same director.

In 1982, the museum already had about 2,500 pieces: about 700 in permanent exhibition, 300 in the Casa de Pedra, and the rest in storage, with an ongoing project to acquire 900 more pieces of agricultural machinery and tools. In the same year, a project was started to completely reorganize the obsolete system of cataloging and registration of the material. In 1984, in an agreement with Funarte, the museum obtained funds to remodel its facilities and expand its collection. However, the renovation was superficial, and from this time on the interest of the public decreased significantly, investments ceased, cataloguing and acceptance of new donations was halted, many pieces went astray, and many others were loaned and never returned. As the years went by, the building began to show serious problems, damaging a large part of the collection that was already overcrowding the small and precarious depository. It would take more than a decade for the work to resume.

In 1996, the Historical Archive finally moved to its own headquarters. In 1997, the museum started to manage the chapel in the replica of the Old Caxias in the Grape Festival Park, and collaborated in the revitalization project of the set of buildings. In 1998, the Casa de Pedra was restored, and in the same year, due to the many structural problems in the main building, an in-depth renovation was carried out, with the replacement of the electrical network, modernization of the kitchen, replacement of the plumbing and sanitary installations, revision of all woodwork and the roofs, replacement of glass, curtains, carpets and general painting. The construction of a new annex at the back of the building made it possible to create a larger technical reserve and to gather in one space all the collection that was scattered in several places and was deteriorating due to poor storage conditions. It also made room for the reorganization of the exhibition rooms and the creation of essential services such as a workshop, video room, library, restoration laboratory, and support rooms. The building, which is one of the oldest in the city, was declared a City Heritage Site on November 28, 2001.

The museum's activities and programs have had a positive impact in increasing the population's awareness of historical and heritage issues, although this awareness is not yet well consolidated or widespread, and is a field in which much remains to be done. Many projects suffer from a chronic lack of funds and a lack of continuity in successive changes of administration.

== Collection ==
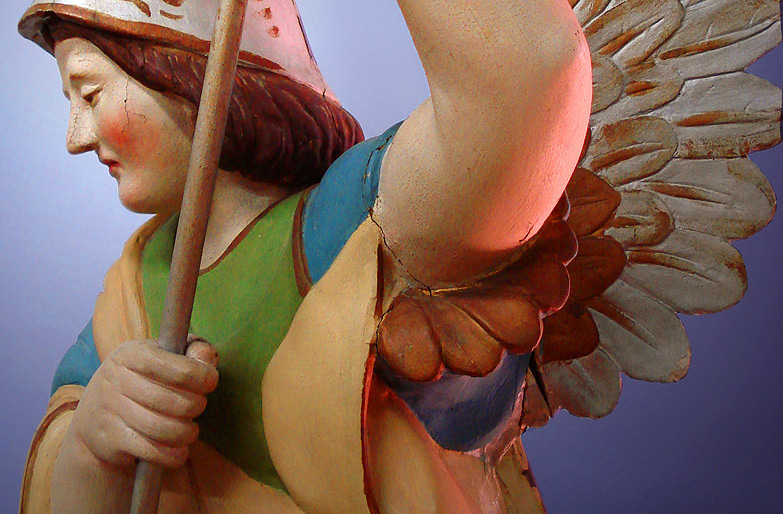
Pietro Stangherlin: The Archangel Michael defeating the devil (detail).

The rich collection of the Municipal Museum has great importance for the history of the Italian colonial region and for the history of Caxias do Sul. It has more than 12,000 pieces that illustrate the previous indigenous occupation of the territory, immigration, the initial possession and cultivation of the land, and the developments and changes in the main activities and professions that occurred in the area of Caxias do Sul during the urbanization process.

The collection includes indigenous artifacts; travel gear; machinery and tools used in agricultural activities; iron, glass, chinaware, and copper objects used in kitchens and workshops; furniture, shoes, and clothing; technical and musical instruments and accessories for personal use; pieces of sacred art, and, finally, objects derived from service, commerce, leisure, culture, and toys.

Among the most interesting individual pieces are a rustic bean sifting machine; a full-wall cupboard with numerous bottles of medicine and pharmaceutical objects, which belonged to a former pharmacy that was demolished; a cash register; a large painting depicting St. Mark the Evangelist; a group representing the Madonna of the Snows and Child and a group depicting St. Michael defeating the devil, by Pietro Stangherlin; a statue of Thérèse of Lisieux aux roses (Teresa de Lisieux) by Michelangelo Zambelli; a processional statue (Portuguese: estátua de roca) of the Blessed Virgin of Mercy by Tarquinio Zambelli, and an anonymous Pietà with archaic features.

== Gallery ==
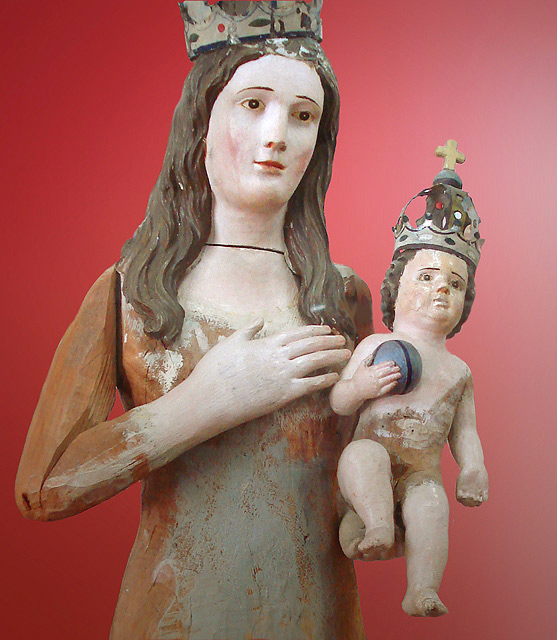
Tarquinio Zambelli: Our Lady of Mercy, 1885

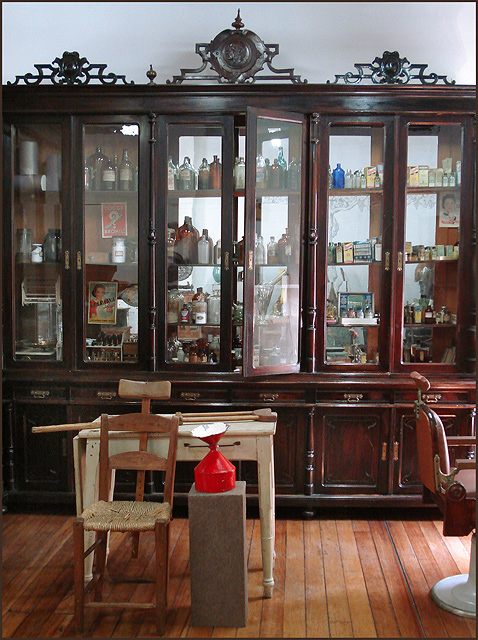
Furniture from an old pharmacy

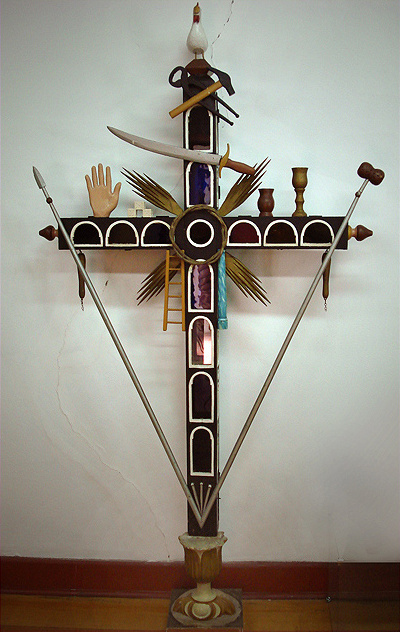
Processional Cross

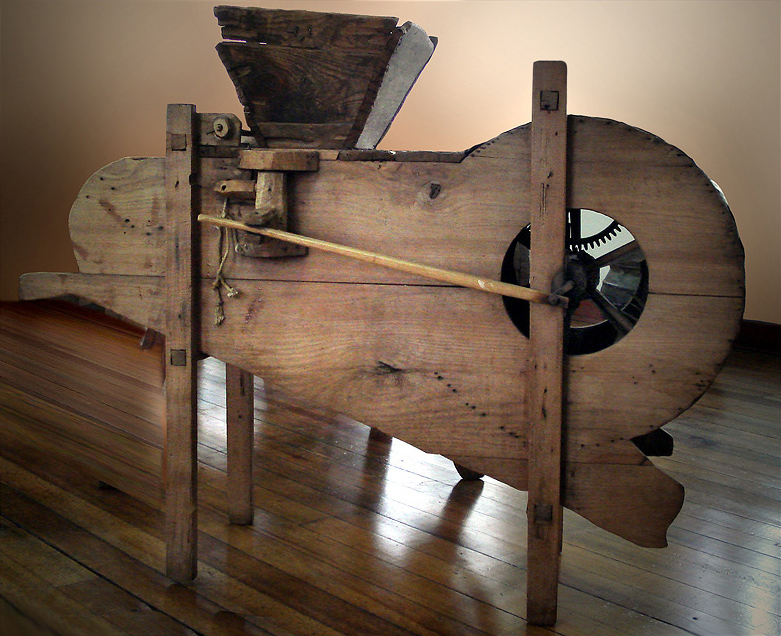
Machine for sifting beans
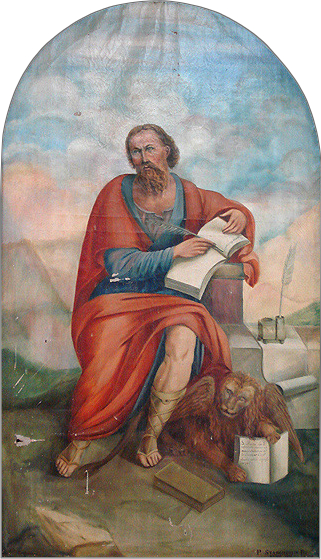
Pietro Stangherlin: St. Mark

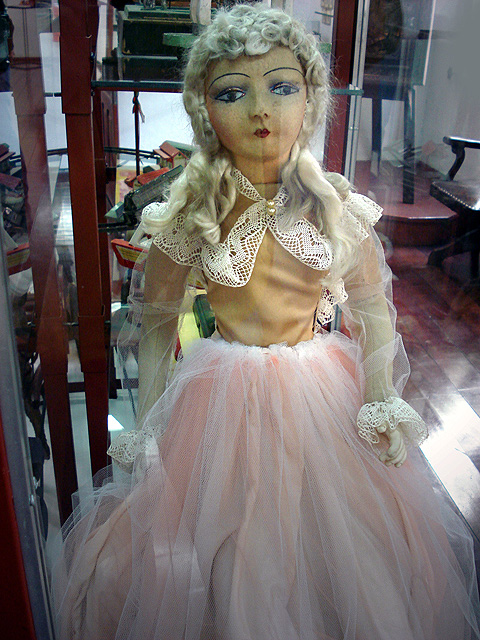
Doll

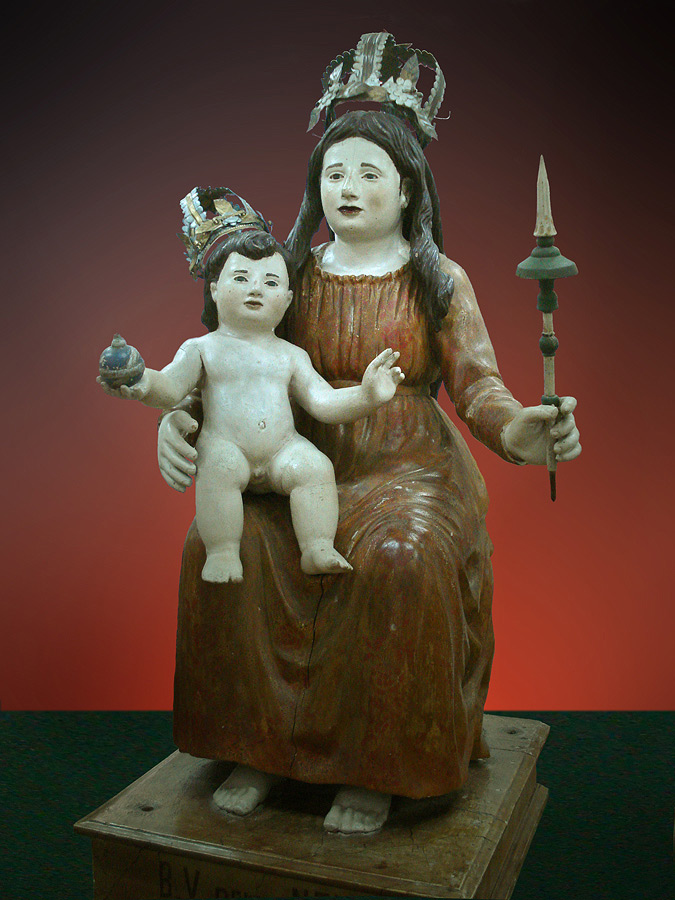
Pietro Stangherlin: Our Lady or Madonna of the Snows, 1885

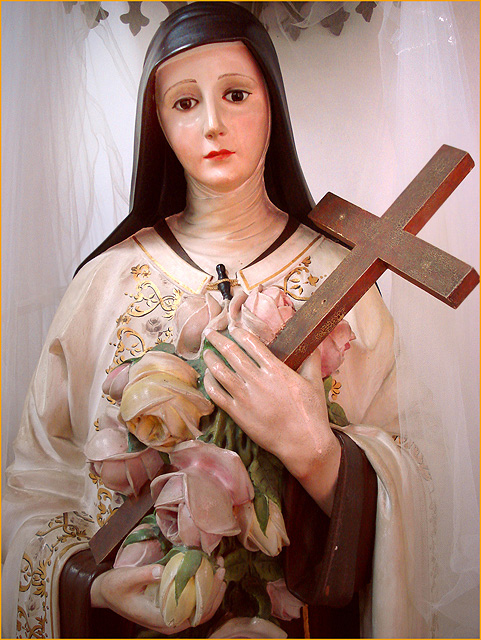
Michelangelo Zambelli: Santa Teresa de Lisieux com rosas

== See also ==
- History of Caxias do Sul
- João Spadari Adami, Brazilian historian
- Estátua de roca, processional statues (lit. 'rock statue') article on Portuguese Wikipedia, which type and term were first popularized by the Portuguese
