= Vicente Rovea =

Italian-Brazilian merchant and politician (1861-1941)

Vincenzo Rovea
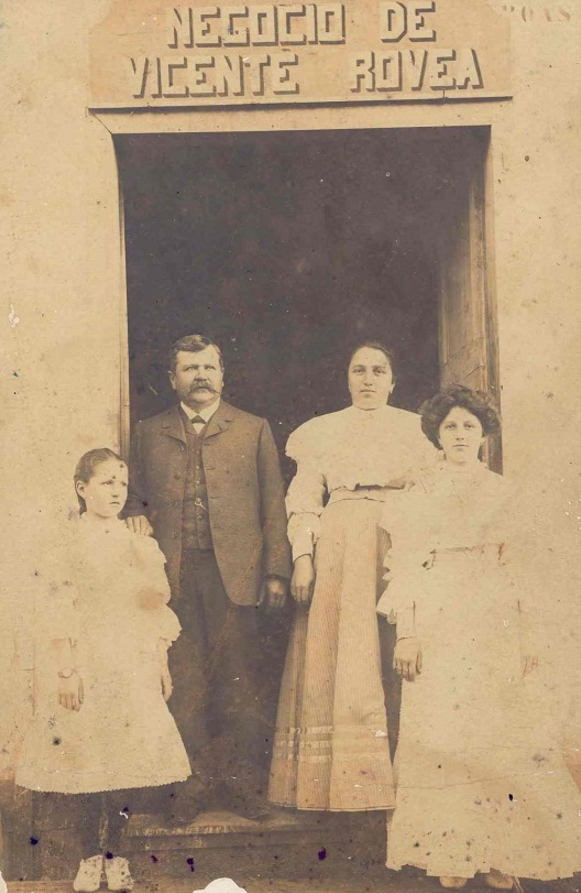
- Born: February 25, 1861
- Died: November 20, 1941 (aged 80)
- Occupation(s): Politician and merchant

Vincenzo Rovea, known in Brazil as Vicente Rovea (Voghera, February 25, 1861 - Caxias do Sul, November 20, 1941) was an Italian-Brazilian merchant and politician.

== Biography ==
Vicente, son of Italians Remigio Rovea and Rosa Fiori, arrived in Caxias do Sul in the 1880s, and in 1890 established a commercial house. Located at one of the entrances to the village, the store soon became an important trading and supply center. It worked with grains, farm items, and haberdashery supplies, besides being an obligatory stop for the muleteers who came to negotiate their products, providing a farmyard for the animals to rest.

While conducting his business, he became actively involved in the political life of the village. When Caxias was emancipated in 1890, from the condition of district of São Sebastião do Caí to autonomous town, a Government Board was installed, which had to start the structuring of the new municipality amidst a turbulent scenario, reflecting both the recent proclamation of the Republic and the dispute for power between federalists and republicans. In addition, the settler population was massively Catholic and a large part followed a conservative and radical current, the ultramontanism, which fiercely resisted the Freemasons, the positivists and the liberals, who dominated the main public offices. In this turbulent environment, Rovea became the leader of the Federalists, as well as a Freemason. Soon, part of the population, in disagreement with the orientation of the newly appointed Board, rose up in the two Revolts of the Settlers, in which Rovea took part as one of the leaders. The main reasons for dissatisfaction were the late taxes charged with fines and interest, and the poor condition of the roads and transportation. The rebels deposed the Board and the first Council, and a Revolutionary Board led by Affonso Amabile and Francisco Januário Salerno took over the town's government. In order to pacify the atmosphere, the State Government reinstalled the council, admitting two revolutionaries, Luiz Pieruccini and Domingos Maineri. The attempt had no effect, and shortly afterwards the second revolt occurred; the official Board and Council were deposed again, and the Revolutionary Board, now composed of Rovea along with Pieruccini and Maineri, took power. The State Government had to interfere again and dissolved the Board it had appointed, appointing in its place an intendant, Antônio Xavier da Luz, with Luiz Pieruccini as his vice, who took office on August 1, 1892.

Meanwhile, Rovea was making his business prosper quickly. Early in the 20th century, he became the richest merchant in Caxias, and was one of the founders of the Associação dos Comerciantes, which brought together the main businessmen. Loraine Giron mentions that he was not very active in the entity, but Mário Gardelin remembered his participation in the commission that promoted the construction of the Korff Bridge, an important achievement to boost trade with the Campos de Cima da Serra, being one of the contractors of the work, and in the commission that raised funds for an Exhibition-Fair that would be held in Porto Alegre. The Association soon became the main engine of the local economy and an influential spokesman for the settlers' demands. Due to its influence, Serafim Terra was appointed intendant in 1904, taking Rovea himself as his vice-governor. At this time, however, the Association was beginning to face a crisis, divided by internal disputes that led to the removal of several members, and with the ascension of merchants to the Vice-Intendency and the council, its role as a claimant faded away. This process was intensified when Rovea assumed the title upon Terra's licensing on May 16, 1907, and when he was elected to the Intendency the following year. In Giron's words, "on August 12, 1908, Vicente Rovea was elected intendant, so the merchants' struggle became a municipal struggle. The municipal intendant assumed the leadership of the community, managing to bring to Caxias the works that were necessary. In this way, the struggle of the Associação dos Comerciantes ceases to be essential to the municipality. Since there are no causes to be defended, once they have been taken over by the intendant, the movement comes to a standstill".

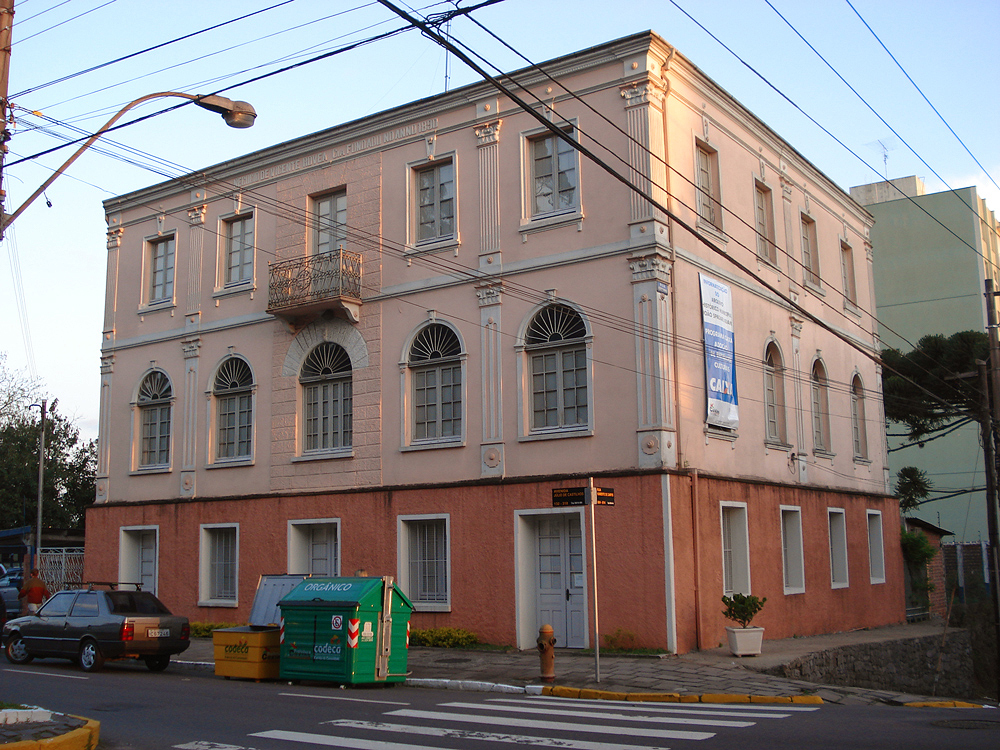
Building that housed Vicente Rovea's residence and shop. It is currently the Municipal Historical Archive.

On January 25, 1910, he left the government for health treatment, and Tancredo Appio Feijó took over as interim governor. However, he would only return to effective government on December 1, 1911, with the resignation of Feijó, handing over the post on August 12, 1912, to José Pena de Moraes, whom Rovea had appointed vice-intendent when he reassigned in 1911. On May 8, 1912, he was promoted to Lieutenant Colonel-Commander of the General Staff of the 97th Infantry Battalion of the National Guard, a corporation of which he had been an officer for many years. His administration was notable for being the beginning of a process of consolidation of power of Italian descendants, since, until that moment, the Intendency had been regularly handed over to agents of Luso-Brazilian origin. Vicente was praised for being able to pacify the situation after many years of intense agitation, actively collaborating "in the definitive consolidation of local politics, which resulted in the congruence of the Caxias family". He received, however, criticism in the press of the time for the high taxes levied and the large increase in public debt.

In early 1909, he announced in the press the liquidation of his business and the sale of several rural properties, but by September 1910 he was back in business as a representative of a quarry and pottery owned by Pedro Jacob Rodrigues, and by 1911 his commercial house had been put back together again. Also in 1911, he was one of the founders of the Tiro de Guerra, taking a seat on the Fiscal Council; in 1913 he was appointed to one of the boards of the Associação dos Comerciantes, which had been reactivated in 1912, and in 1914 he is mentioned as the local banker of the insurance agency A Mundial, based in Rio de Janeiro. In the mid-1920s his business ceased.

On July 8, 1941, shortly before he died, he was solemnly celebrated by the Associação dos Comerciantes as one of the five founders still living, when he received, along with the others, the title of honorary member. Vicente Rovea was married to Bortola Venzon (1871-1939), and left descendants. The house where he lived and maintained his business later served as the headquarters of the Carbone Hospital and the Santo Antonio Charity Hospital and, after many popular claims, was declared a monument by the State in 1986 and by the Municipality in 2002; today it houses the João Spadari Adami Municipal Historical Archive. A street in Caxias do Sul is named after him.

== See also ==
- History of Caxias do Sul
