= João Spadari Adami =

Brazilian historian

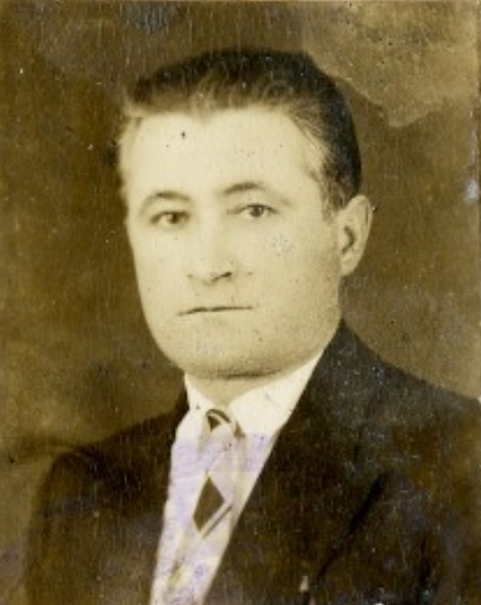
- Born: January 11, 1897
- Died: December 4, 1972 (aged 75); Caxias do Sul, Rio Grande do Sul; Brazil
- Occupation: Historian

João Spadari Adami (Caxias do Sul, January 11, 1897 - Caxias do Sul, December 4, 1972) was a Brazilian historian.

== Biography ==
João Spadari Adami was the son of Francesco Adami and Selene Spadari, Italian immigrants who arrived in Caxias do Sul with their parents when they were still minors. Francesco's parents arrived in the early days of 1877, when their son was six years old, and Selene's in 1891, when she was fifteen. After his marriage, Francesco and his wife settled in the area that would later become the São Pelegrino neighborhood. He worked as a shoemaker and she worked as a washerwoman. They had the following children: João, Alfredo (died young), Alfredo II, Adelaide, Catarina, Clara, Francisca, Ernesto, Santina and Maria.

At the age of 9, João was introduced to the tailor's trade, and shortly after to the barber's trade. During his youth, he was a soccer player, participating, in 1910, in the creation of the city's first soccer team, the Esporte Clube Ideal, which was short-lived but important. According to Cruz, the team was "a very significant initiative in a conservative city where, until then, the main sports played were card games, morra games, and bocce", representing "the driving force and diffuser of the soccer practice that, very soon, would be absorbed and disseminated as another social activity by the city's recreational clubs".

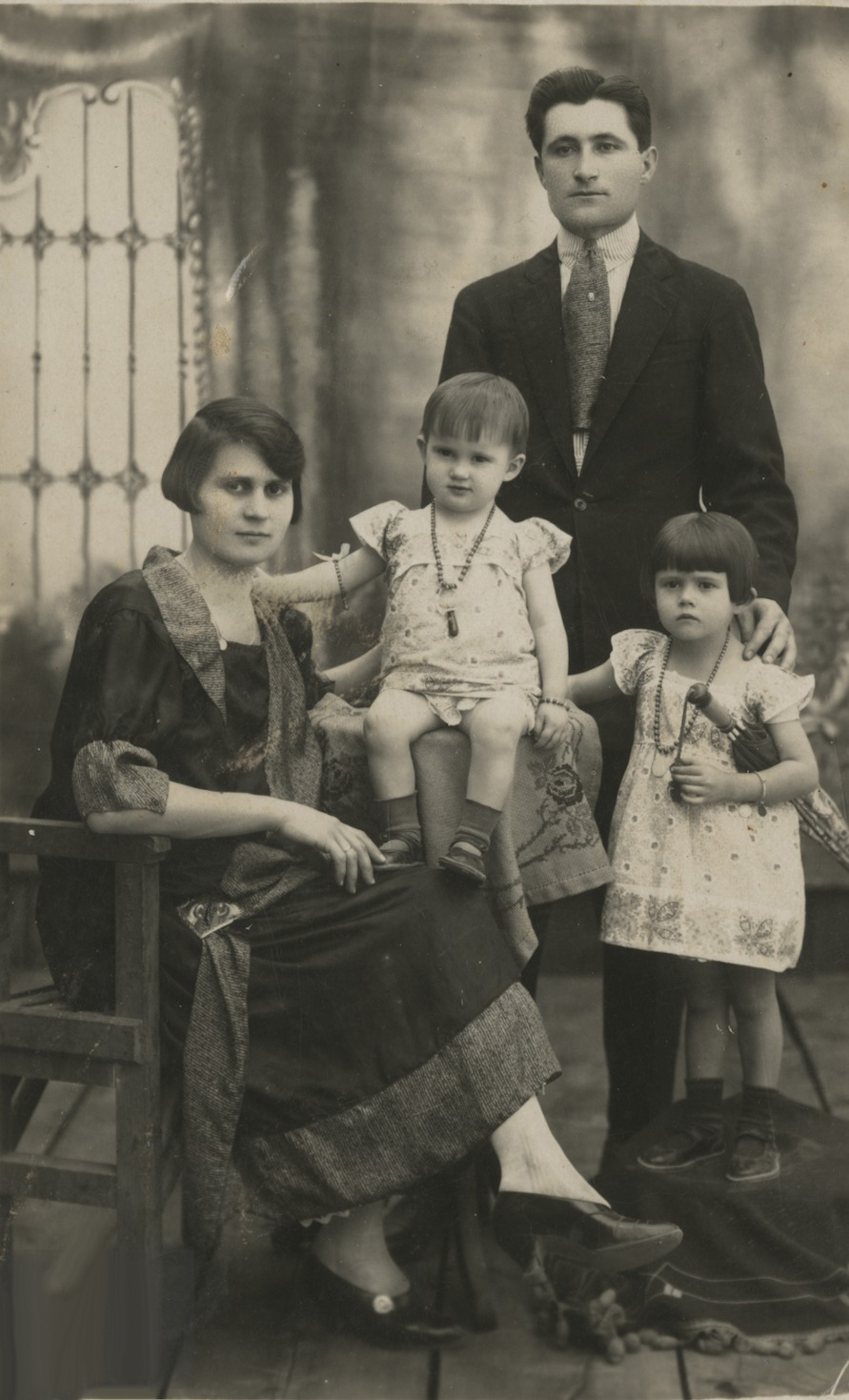
João Spadari Adami in 1929 with his wife Etelvina and daughters Serenita and Teresinha.

At the age of 14, João moved to the district of Ana Rech, where he established a partnership in a barber shop. In 1913, he traveled to Antônio Prado to help a cousin; he should return in a few days, but would remain there for many years. In 1919, he was called up by the Army to serve in Cruz Alta, and in 1923, he returned to Antônio Prado. At this time, he became interested in the history of Caxias do Sul, a subject to which he would devote the rest of his life.

In 1929, João settled permanently in Caxias do Sul, working as a barber and tailor. He kept a large collection of documents in the back of his barbershop. There, the Academia Caxiense de Letras, of which he was one of the idealizers, being ad hoc secretary in the foundation session, and later occupying the treasury, was founded. He was one of the most active members of this entity until shortly before his death. He also took on the direction of the Municipal Museum for some years, which at the time was merged with the Municipal Historical Archives. João was married to Etelvina Lautert de Castro, and had five children with her: Theresinha Belkys, Victor Francisco, Serenita Maria, Mirian, and Maria de Lourdes.

== Work ==
Adami was the pioneer of historiography of Caxias do Sul at a time when nothing there had been studied deeply. He stood out for his uncommon objectivity and fidelity to documents, while the "official history" was still systematically mythified in grandiloquent speeches that disseminated a series of factual errors about the city's formation. In his research, he discovered a large number of forgotten documents in public archives and private collections, transcribing and publishing many of them. For years he kept, in his barbershop, the Informative Center of the History of Caxias, where he accumulated a vast amount of historiographic material, and published in the press several articles and chronicles on specific themes. Despite his amateurism, local historians are unanimous in recognizing the importance of his work and his avant-gardism in a previously unexplored field.

His work stands out even more because Adami had a very poor education, attending only the 3rd grade of elementary school. He always acknowledged his precarious training, and protested against the specialists who were not interested in the past of Caxias, forcing an amateur to do what they were supposed to do. As he grew older, he was often consulted by teachers and students on his favorite subject and gave numerous lectures at the University of Caxias do Sul, in schools, cultural groups, and other venues.

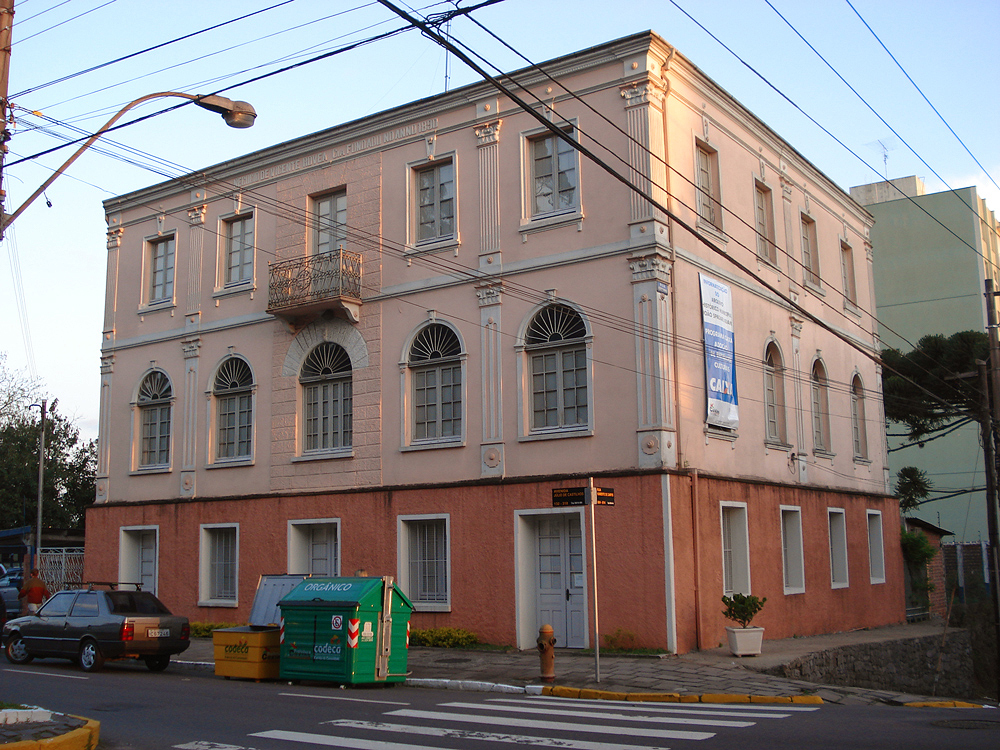
The headquarters of the João Spadari Adami Municipal Historical Archive.

His masterpiece is História de Caxias do Sul, divided into 7 volumes and published between 1951 and 1981, which is a basic reference for the knowledge of local history until today. The priceless documental collection he gathered along the years was donated by his descendants to the João Spadari Adami Municipal Historical Archive, which, since 1997, bears his name in memory and in honor of his work. He also received the Caxias do Sul Medal for his relevant services and, after his death, a new street was named after him. He was the inspiration for one of the characters in the book Script, by Tadiane Tronca, and was honored at the 2016 Grape Festival. In the words of Mario Gardelin,

Few people have been so passionate about an ideal and dedicated so much constant effort to it as João Spadari Adami to the history of Caxias do Sul. Nature gave him enthusiasm and commitment, but refused him basic study, and what would have been the most effective means, attendance at a college. [...] And this did not prevent him from writing in newspapers, addressing often controversial ideas and facts or adopting political positions that today need to be interpreted. [...] He witnessed history, writing and observing episodes he witnessed, collecting newspapers and photographs. [...] João Spadari Adami, in a certain way, repeats when it comes to history what the pioneers were in relation to agriculture, commerce and industry. They improvised. They worked by intuition. And the results were excellent.

In Décio Bombassaro's opinion,

His work had a clear objective: to bring to light the true events that preceded and were decisive in the founding of Caxias do Sul. In his self-imposed mission, João Spadari was impeccable. Not that he used scientific research processes, since he did not know them. His style is pamphleteering, limiting himself to making assertions shielded by official historical documents. He did not believe in oral testimonies, which are easy to hide, either because of his advanced age or because of human vanity. For the journalist and historian Mário Gardelin, when one examines the work of João Spadari Adami and his contribution to the history of Caxias do Sul, one is amazed at how much he did, with so few means at his disposal. On the one hand, he leaned on his instinct as a man passionate about history, of which, however, he did not have a mythical or heroic vision, but a pure taste for knowledge and knowing the facts. On the other hand, he managed to read, annotate and publish thousands of documents and draft studies that will always be cited by the historian of the future.

=== Publications ===
- História de Caxias do Sul:
  - Volume I: Caxias A Pérola das Colônias;
  - Volume II: Caxias do Sul;
  - Volume III: História de Caxias do Sul 1864-1962;
  - Volume IV: História de Caxias do Sul 1964-1970;
  - Volume V: História de Caxias do Sul: Exposições e Festas da Uva 1881-1965;
  - Volume VI: História de Caxias do Sul (Educação) 1877-1967;
  - Volume VII: História de Caxias do Sul (Social-Esportiva);
- História da Poesia Caxiense;
- História da Música Caxiense;
- Dicionário de Intelectuais Caxienses;
- Caxias e o Elemento Luso-Brasileiro;
- Meus Tropeços com o Italianismo;
- Escrevendo para Mim;
- Numerous chronicles and essays published in newspapers and pamphlets.

== See also ==
- History of Caxias do Sul
