= Church of Our Lady of Lourdes (Caxias do Sul) =

Catholic temple in Rio Grande do Sul, Brazil

Coordinates: 29°10′10″S 51°09′42″W

- Igreja Nossa Senhora de Lourdes
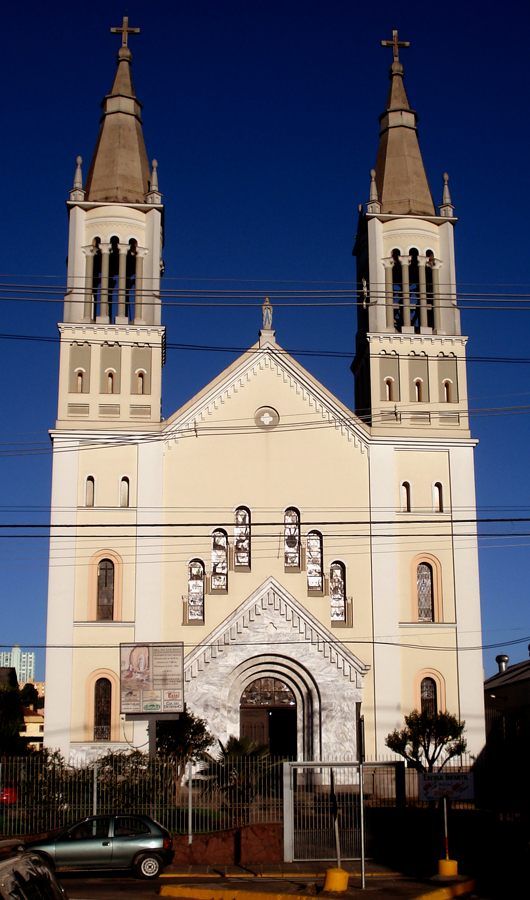
- Facade of the Church of Our Lady of Lourdes
- Church of Our Lady of Lourdes
- Location: Caxias do Sul, Rio Grande do Sul; Brazil
- Denomination: Roman Catholic Church

History
- Founded: 1936

Architecture
- Completed: 1948

Administration
- Diocese: Diocese of Caxias do Sul

The Church of Our Lady of Lourdes (Portuguese: Igreja Nossa Senhora de Lourdes) is a Catholic temple located in the Brazilian city of Caxias do Sul, in Rio Grande do Sul. The Parish of Our Lady of Lourdes was created on February 8, 1942, by decree of Bishop José Barea. It was the first parish to be separated from the Parish of Saint Theresa, which was the only one in the urban area of Caxias do Sul until 1942. Father Maximiliano Franzoi was appointed its first parish priest in the same ceremony. Upon its creation, the Parish of Our Lady of Lourdes extended over a large area that was still only partially urbanized.

The Parish of Our Lady of Lourdes also originated the parishes of the Holy Family and the Sacred Heart of Jesus in 1959, St. Vincent in 1964, the Holy Apostles in 1973 and St. Cyricus in 1974. An adjoining sports hall was built in 1976 and the new parish house was inaugurated in 1985. It conducts an extensive charitable activity, donating around 15 tons of food a month to disadvantaged people and providing space for several aid groups.

== History ==
Devotion to Our Lady of Lourdes in Caxias do Sul began due to a natural grotto in the former Santa Terezinha Orphanage, now the Madre Imilda School. Since Mary's apparitions in Lourdes in 1858 occurred inside a grotto, the residents of the neighborhood decided to place a statue of Our Lady inside for devotion. Before the grotto was inaugurated, the community already wanted to build a church dedicated to Our Lady of Lourdes. In 1925, during a meeting at the firm Michielon, Menegassi e Cia, a partnership was formed under the leadership of businessmen João Menegassi, David Bisol and Vicente Rovea, whose task was to raise funds to build a church and acquire land for a cemetery for the dead of their families.

The cornerstone of the masonry temple, which would replace the temporary wooden chapel, was laid on December 27, 1936, on land donated by Michielon, Menegassi e Cia. Bishop José Barea, Mayor Dante Marcucci and businessmen Luiz Michielon and Abramo Eberle participated. Construction work began in 1939 with the creation of the crypt, where religious celebrations and social events were held to acquire funds for the future church.

== Architectural features ==
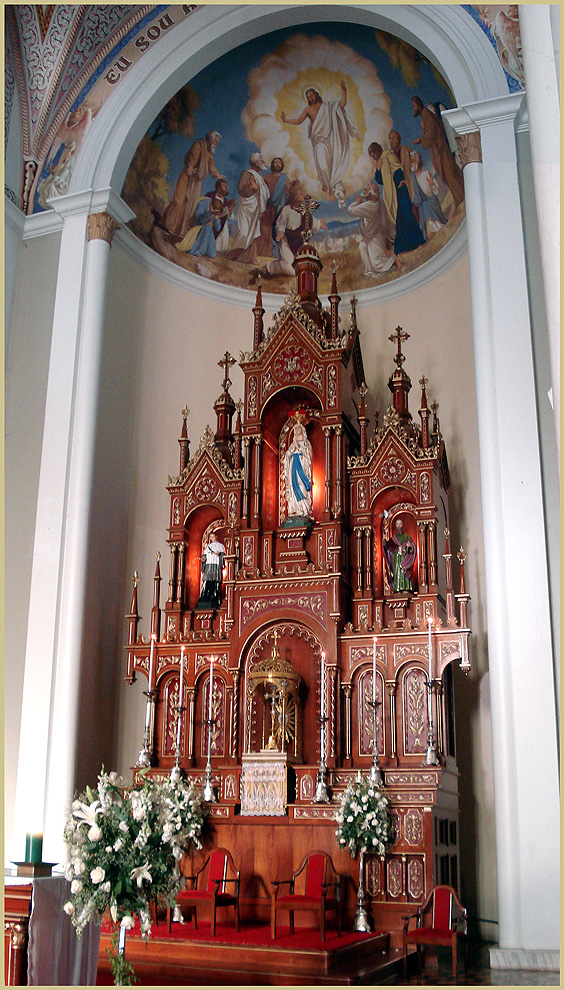
High altar and the painting in the transept.

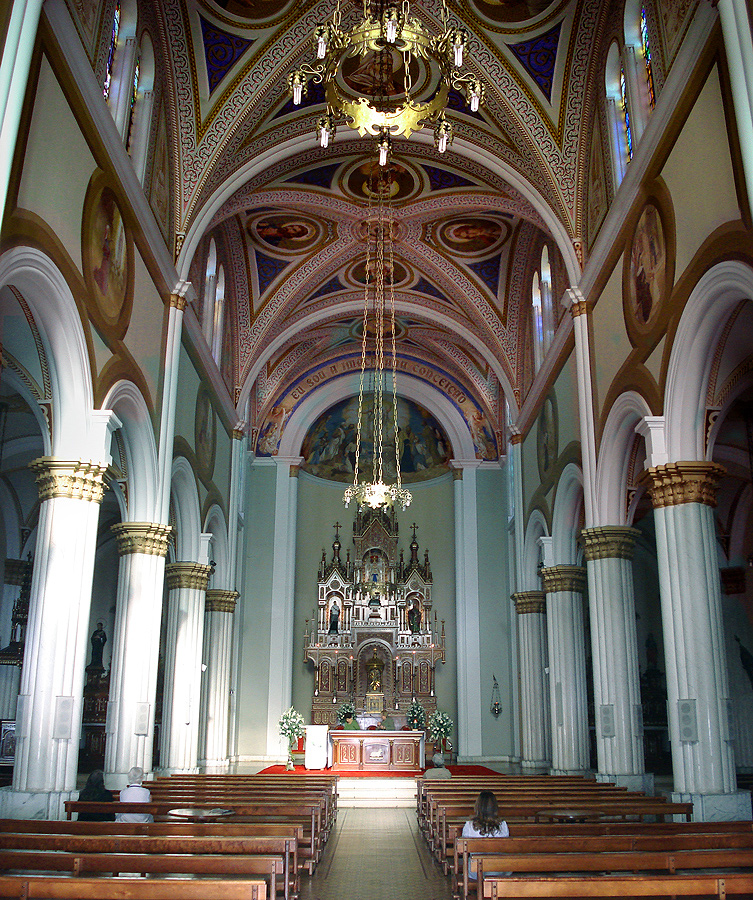
Central nave of the Church of Our Lady of Lourdes

Work began on the interior of the building in 1944 and was completed on June 13, 1948, with the inauguration of the pulpit. The towers began the following year and were completed two years later. The high altar was inaugurated in 1953. Originally clad in copper, the needles of the towers underwent a renovation and were cemented in 1964. The work was carried out by the engineering firm Hugo Grazziotin e Cia, with Luiz Pontalti and Affonso Longhi as executors.

The church features a modernist style with Romanesque elements. It has a marble-clad frontispiece with concentric arches under a triangular pediment decorated with prominent cornices. At the top are six slender windows under a pediment that imitates that of the frontispiece and includes a small oculus. On the side, there are two bell towers with full-arched windows on the lower levels, followed by an open level where the bells are located, with Corinthian columns supporting a prismatic crown adorned with small pinnacles at the corners of the base and a cross at the top.

The interior has a small atrium at the entrance that leads to the central nave, which is flanked by two smaller naves with stained glass windows depicting saints. The walls are decorated with a Via Crucis by Estacio Zambelli. At the back of each side nave, there are two high Neo-Gothic carved altars made by Alexandre Bartelle, where several images of saints are arranged, including a rare representation of the Virgin Mary as a baby.

The central nave is separated from the lateral spaces by large columns with Romanesque capitals supporting round arches and a clerestory with twin windows decorated with stained glass. The ceiling is formed by a series of barrel vaults decorated with paintings in floral motifs with medallions for images of saints. Large gilded bronze chandeliers hang from above and the floor is tiled with geometric patterns. The main chapel is shaped like an apse and rises slightly above the nave, separated from it by a large round arch and topped by a half-dome with a painting depicting the resurrection of Christ.

The altarpiece in the background is a neo-Gothic carving with gilded parts by Alexandre Bartelle. The statue of Our Lady of Lourdes with a gold crown made by Metalúrgica Abramo Eberle is placed in an elevated niche. The church also has two neo-Gothic wooden confessionals and a small baptistery with a baptismal font covered in carved wood in the same style as the altars and confessionals. The pulpit is designed by José Gollo.

== See also ==
- History of Caxias do Sul
- Historic Center of Caxias do Sul
- St. Theresa's Cathedral
