= St. Theresa's Cathedral, Caxias do Sul =

St. Theresa's Cathedral
- Portuguese: Catedral Santa Teresa
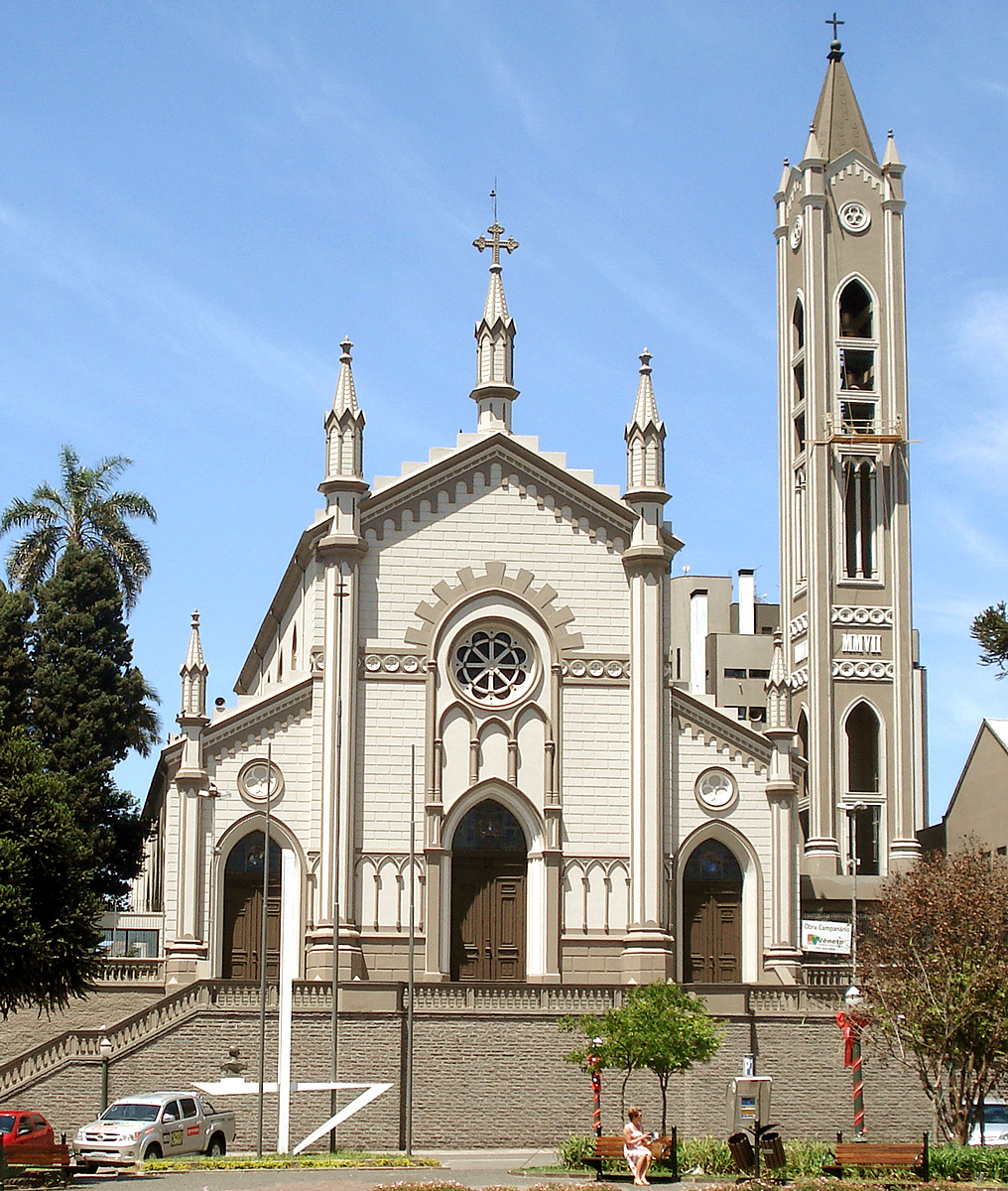
- St. Theresa's Cathedral
- Location: Caxias do Sul
- Country: Brazil
- Denomination: Roman Catholic Church

History
- Dedicated: 14 October 1899
- Consecrated: 15 October 1900

Administration
- Province: Porto Allegre
- Diocese: Caxias do Sul

St. Theresa's Cathedral, (Portuguese: Catedral Santa Teresa) also called Caxias do Sul Cathedral, is a parish of the Roman Catholic Church in Caxias do Sul, Rio Grande do Sul, Brazil, and the cathedral of the Diocese of Caxias do Sul.

The cathedral church is located in Dante Alighieri Square in the city center. It dedicated to St. Theresa of Ávila, reflecting the appreciation of the local Italian immigrants to the Empress Teresa Cristina, wife of Pedro II, emperor of Brazil.

The first stone of the church was laid on 5 December 1895. The work proceeded rapidly, with the spontaneous support of the settlers. It was enclosed by mid-1896, solemnly inaugurated on 14 October 1899, and consecrated by bishop Cláudio Gonçalves Ponce de Leon on 15 October 1900, the Feast of St. Theresa. It was designated a cathedral in 1934, with the erection of the Diocese of Caxias.

== See also ==
- Catholic Church in Brazil
- Pietro Nosadini
- Historic Center of Caxias do Sul
- Church of Our Lady of Lourdes
