= List of twin towns and sister cities in Australia =

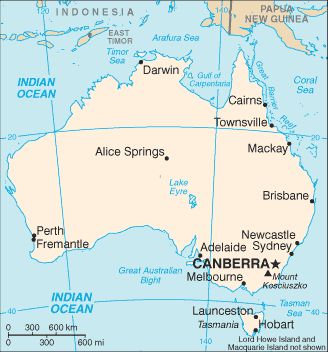
Map of Australia

This is a list of places (local government areas) in Australia which have standing links to local communities in other countries. In most cases, the association, especially when formalised by local government, is known as "town twinning" (usually in Europe) or "sister cities" (usually in the rest of the world).

== A ==
Adelaide

- Austin, United States
- Christchurch, New Zealand
- Himeji, Japan
- Penang Island, Malaysia
- Qingdao, China

Albany

- Nichinan, Japan

== B ==
Ballarat

- Inagawa, Japan

Banana

- Boulouparis, New Caledonia

Bathurst

- Ōkuma, Japan

Bayside, New South Wales

- Binhai (Tianjin), China
- Bint Jbeil, Lebanon
- Bitola, North Macedonia
- Gaiarine, Italy
- Gilgandra, Australia
- Glyfada, Greece
- Takéo, Cambodia
- Yamatsuri, Japan

Bayside, Victoria

- Beaumaris, Wales, United Kingdom
- Cixi, China
- Nazareth, United States
- King's Lynn and West Norfolk, England, United Kingdom
- Palavas-les-Flots, France
- San Marino, San Marino

Bega Valley

- Littleton, United States

Belmont

- Adachi (Tokyo), Japan

Blacktown

- Liaocheng, China
- Liverpool Plains, Australia
- Porirua, New Zealand
- Suseong (Daegu), South Korea

Bland

- Boring, United States
- Dull, Scotland, United Kingdom
- Whitby, England, United Kingdom

Blue Mountains

- Flagstaff, United States
- Sanda, Japan

Brisbane

- Abu Dhabi, United Arab Emirates
- Auckland, New Zealand
- Chongqing, China
- Daejeon, South Korea
- Hyderabad, India
- Kaohsiung, Taiwan
- Kobe, Japan
- Semarang, Indonesia
- Shenzhen, China

Bunbury

- Jiaxing, China
- Setagaya (Tokyo), Japan

Bundaberg

- Nanning, China
- Settsu, Japan

Burwood

- Africo, Italy
- Badolato, Italy
- Cinquefrondi, Italy
- Gerace, Italy
- Geumcheon (Seoul), South Korea
- Martone, Italy
- Platì, Italy
- Sandakan, Malaysia

Busselton

- Sugito, Japan

== C ==
Cairns

- Lae, Papua New Guinea
- Minami, Japan
- Oyama, Japan
- Riga, Latvia
- Scottsdale, United States
- Sidney, Canada
- Zhanjiang, China

Camden

- Kashiwa, Japan

Campaspe

- Shangri-La, China

Campbelltown

- Coonamble, Australia
- Koshigaya, Japan

Canberra

- Beijing, China
- Nara, Japan
- Wellington, New Zealand

Canterbury-Bankstown

- Broken Hill, Australia
- Colorado Springs, United States
- Suita, Japan
- Yangcheon (Seoul), South Korea

Central Coast

- Edogawa (Tokyo), Japan

Central Highlands

- Altona, Canada
- Ichinoseki, Japan

Charters Towers

- Daqing, China

Clarence

- Akkeshi, Japan

Cockburn

- Mobile, United States
- Split, Croatia
- Yueyang, China

Coffs Harbour

- Sasebo, Japan

Colac Otway

- Walker, United States

== D ==
Darwin

- Ambon, Indonesia
- Anchorage, United States
- Dili, Timor-Leste
- Haikou, China
- Kalymnos, Greece
- Milikapiti (Tiwi Islands), Australia

Devonport

- Minamata, Japan

Dubbo

- Minokamo, Japan
- Toyama, Japan
- Wujiang (Suzhou), China

== F ==
Fairfield

- Griffith, Australia
- Hsinchu, Taiwan
- Locri, Italy
- Palmi, Italy
- Platì, Italy
- Riace, Italy
- Roccella Ionica, Italy
- San Giorgio Morgeto, Italy
- San Lorenzo, Italy
- Siderno, Italy
- Zhenjiang, China

Federation

- Miki, Japan

Frankston

- Susono, Japan
- Suva, Fiji
- Wuxi, China

Fraser Coast

- Kasukabe, Japan
- Leshan, China

Fremantle

- Capo d'Orlando, Italy
- Funchal, Portugal
- Molfetta, Italy
- Seberang Perai, Malaysia
- Yokosuka, Japan

== G ==
Gladstone

- Saiki, Japan

Gold Coast

- Beihai, China
- Chengdu, China
- Dubai, United Arab Emirates
- Fort Lauderdale, United States
- Netanya, Israel
- Nouméa, New Caledonia
- Tainan, Taiwan
- Taipei, Taiwan
- Takasu, Japan
- Zhuhai, China

Goulburn Mulwaree

- Jiangdu (Yangzhou), China
- Shibetsu, Japan
- Wagin, Australia

Greater Bendigo

- Haimen, China
- Los Altos, United States
- Penzance, England, United Kingdom

Greater Dandenong

- Xuzhou, China

Greater Geelong

- Izumiōtsu, Japan
- Lianyungang, China

Greater Geraldton

- Kosai, Japan
- Zhanjiang, China

Greater Shepparton

- Baguio, Philippines
- Lijiang, China
- Novato, United States
- Ōshū, Japan
- Toyoake, Japan

Griffith

- Borso del Grappa, Italy
- Castelcucco, Italy
- Cavaso del Tomba, Italy
- Fairfield, Australia
- Harbin, China
- Monfumo, Italy
- Pieve del Grappa, Italy
- Possagno, Italy

Gunnedah

- Lane Cove, Australia
- Yinzhou (Ningbo), China

== H ==
Hawkesbury

- Kyōtamba, Japan
- Temple City, United States

Hilltops

- Lanzhou, China

Hobart

- L'Aquila, Italy
- Yaizu, Japan

Hobsons Bay

- Anjō, Japan

== I ==
Inner West – Marrickville

- Bethlehem, Palestine
- Funchal, Portugal
- Keelung, Taiwan
- Kos, Greece
- Larnaca, Cyprus
- Safita, Syria
- Zonnebeke, Belgium

Ipswich

- Changde, China
- Hyderabad, India
- Nantou, Taiwan
- Nerima (Tokyo), Japan
- Pengzhou, China
- Wenzhou, China

Isaac

- Yantai, China

== J ==
Joondalup

- Jinan, China

== K ==
Kiama

- Hội An, Vietnam

== L ==
Lake Macquarie

- Hakodate, Japan
- Rotorua Lakes, New Zealand
- Round Rock, United States
- Tanagura, Japan

Lane Cove

- Gunnedah, Australia
- Huzhou, China

Latrobe

- Taizhou, China
- Takasago, Japan

Launceston

- Ikeda, Japan
- Napa, United States
- Putian, China
- Taiyuan, China

Lismore

- Eau Claire, United States
- (Republic of Ireland) Lismore, Ireland
- Makassar, Indonesia
- Yamatotakada, Japan

Liverpool

- Toda, Japan

Logan

- Hirakata, Japan
- Suzhou, China
- Taoyuan, Taiwan

Lockyer Valley

- Ageo, Japan

== M ==
Macedon Ranges

- Tōkai, Japan

Mackay

- Honiara, Solomon Islands
- Kailua-Kona, United States
- Matsuura, Japan
- Yantai, China

Manjimup

- Jiashan, China

Marion

- Kokubunji, Japan

Melbourne

- Boston, United States
- Milan, Italy
- Osaka, Japan
- Thessaloniki, Greece
- Tianjin, China

Merri-bek

- Çorum, Turkey
- Solarino, Italy
- Sparta, Greece
- Xianyang, China

Mildura

- Dali Bai, China
- Kumatori, Japan
- Upland, United States

Moreton Bay

- San'yō-Onoda, Japan
- Winton, Australia

== N ==
Newcastle

- Ube, Japan

North Burnett – Gayndah

- Zonhoven, Belgium

Northern Beaches

- Bath, England, United Kingdom
- Brewarrina, Australia
- Huntington Beach, United States
- Jing'an (Shanghai), China
- Taitō (Tokyo), Japan

== O ==
Oberon

- Eceabat, Turkey

Orange

- Mount Hagen, Papua New Guinea
- Orange, United States
- Timaru, New Zealand
- Ushiku, Japan

== P ==
Parkes

- Coventry, England, United Kingdom

Penrith

- Fujieda, Japan
- Gangseo (Seoul), South Korea
- Penrith, England, United Kingdom

Perth

- Chengdu, China
- Houston, United States
- Kagoshima, Japan
- Kastellorizo, Greece
- Nanjing, China
- Perth, Scotland, United Kingdom
- Rhodes, Greece
- San Diego, United States
- Seocho (Seoul), South Korea
- Vasto, Italy

Port Adelaide Enfield

- Malmö, Sweden

Port Lincoln

- Lincoln, England, United Kingdom
- Muroto, Japan

Port Macquarie-Hastings

- Handa, Japan

Port Phillip

- Ōbu, Japan

Port Stephens

- Bellingham, United States
- Tateyama, Japan
- Yugawara, Japan

== R ==
Randwick

- Albi, France
- Kastellorizo, Greece
- Randwick, England, United Kingdom

Redland

- Qinhuangdao, China

Richmond Valley

- Cassino, Italy

Rockhampton

- Ibusuki, Japan

Rockingham

- Akō, Japan

== S ==
Salisbury

- Mobara, Japan

Southern Downs

- Shiwa, Japan

Strathfield

- Gapyeong, South Korea

Subiaco

- Subiaco, Italy
- Subiaco, United States

Sunshine Coast

- Fenland, England, United Kingdom
- Le Mont-Dore, New Caledonia
- Tatebayashi, Japan
- Xiamen, China

Sutherland

- Chūō (Tokyo), Japan
- Lakewood, United States

Swan Hill

- Villers-Bretonneux, France
- Yamagata, Japan

Sydney

- Florence, Italy
- Guangzhou, China
- Nagoya, Japan
- Portsmouth, England, United Kingdom
- San Francisco, United States
- Wellington, New Zealand

== T ==
Tamworth

- Chaoyang (Beijing), China
- Gore, New Zealand
- Nashville, United States
- Sannohe, Japan
- Tamworth, England, United Kingdom

Tea Tree Gully

- Asakuchi, Japan
- Borodianka, Ukraine

Temora

- Izumizaki, Japan
- Upington, South Africa

Tenterfield

- Ottobeuren, Germany

Toowoomba

- Paju, South Korea
- Takatsuki, Japan
- Whanganui, New Zealand
- Yuecheng (Shaoxing), China

Townsville

- Changshu, China
- Foshan, China
- Iwaki, Japan
- Port Moresby, Papua New Guinea
- Shūnan, Japan
- Suwon, South Korea

== W ==
Wagga Wagga

- Kunming, China
- Leavenworth, United States
- Nördlingen, Germany

Warrnambool

- Changchun, China
- Miura, Japan

Whitehorse

- Matsudo, Japan

Whitsunday

- Yantai, China

Willoughby

- Gangdong (Seoul), South Korea
- Guardia Sanframondi, Italy
- Suginami (Tokyo), Japan

Wollongong

- Kawasaki, Japan
- Ohrid, North Macedonia

Wyndham

- Changzhou, China
- Chiryū, Japan
- Costa Mesa, United States
