= Pederobba =

Pederobba Pederoba
- Comune
- Comune di Pederobba
- Location within Italy Location within Veneto
- Coordinates: 45°52′N 11°57′E
- Country: Italy
- Region: Veneto
- Province: Province of Treviso (TV)
- Frazioni: Onigo, Covolo

Area
  - Total: 29.3 km^{2} (11.3 sq mi)

Population (Nov. 2025)
  - Total: 7,262
  - Density: 248/km^{2} (642/sq mi)
- Demonym: Pederobbesi
- Time zone: UTC+1 (CET)
  - Summer (DST): UTC+2 (CEST)
- Postal code: 31040
- Dialing code: 0423
- Website: Official website

Pederobba (Venetian: Pederoba) is a comune (municipality) in the Province of Treviso in the Italian region Veneto, located about 60 kilometres (37 mi) northwest of Venice and about 30 kilometres (19 mi) northwest of Treviso. As of 30 November 2025, it had a population of 7,262 and an area of 29.3 square kilometres (11.3 mi^{2}).

The municipality of Pederobba contains the frazioni (subdivisions, mainly villages and hamlets) Onigo, Covolo, Curogna, Levada.

Pederobba borders the municipalities of Cavaso del Tomba, Cornuda, Crocetta del Montello, Monfumo, Setteville, Valdobbiadene, and Vidor.

== History ==
The Roman Empire began its rule of Pederobba in approximately the 2nd Century BC. Rome's presence is documented with various Roman ancient artifacts recovered through the land. The name itself, "Pederobba", is a toponym from the Latin petra rubla, a reference to the red stones characteristic of this locality.

During the Roman Empire Pederobba was an ancient area of transit, with the Strada Via Claudia Augusta Altinate and Via Aurelia (road from Padua to Asolo), and Feltrina to Feltria (today, Feltre) an important Roman municipality. Pederobba's transit characteristic prevailed through the ages, and the roads feature numerous places of worship facing the roads to provide evidence to modernity of the historical passage of pilgrims, ancient through medieval, through its land.

The first documentation referencing Pederobba (and including Onigo, and Covolo) dates to the early Middle Ages, with reference in 1000 to establishment of the Church of Pederobba, and Pederobba as the seat for parish churches. In 1152, Pope Eugene II confirmed the parish of Plebem de Petrarubea. In 1283, the Municipality of Treviso split the area into 4 districts: (1) Pederobba and (2) Visna di Pederobba into the "Dom" district, and (3) Onigo and (4) Covolo into the "Oltrecagnan" district.

The Republic of Venice (La Serenissima), 1337-1797, brought wealth to the region, and construction of mills and factories. Pederobba grew to become the site of one of the most important markets in the sixteenth century. In 1646, Venice sold the lands to the Onigo and Pisani families, who became feudal lords. Pederobba was linked closely to the Onigo family, who resided in a castle near the homonymous hamlet. The thirteenth century struggles between the Onigo and Ezzelini did provide some upset to the region. The Onigo castle (Mura della Bastia) ruins remain today. With the demise of the Venetian empire in 1797, Veneto (including Pederobba) became vulnerable to the foreign forces of the French and Austrian rules who followed.

With each of the Napoleonic (1805-1814) and Austrian empires taking over the land, these imperial administrations sought to boost local agriculture of Pederobba. Napoleon Bonaparte established the Pederobba municipality by decree in 1810. The Kingdom of Italy (Napoleonic) abolished the medieval land systems, and introduced the "Stato Civile", civil recordings of births, deaths, and marriages. Many of the Stato Civile records for Pederobba are preserved and available today, providing a rich resource for family historians and genealogists. Following the defeat of Napoleon, Austria and the Lombardy-Veneto Kingdom took dominion in 1815.

The Lombardy–Venetian Kingdom prevailed from 1815 until the Austrian retreat in 1866, with the Unification of Italy. The Austrians took with them much of Pederobba's resources and wealth. The Unification also tore down feudal land systems, but this gave rise to subsistence farming to the new landowners. Resultingly, hunger and poverty prevailed, leading to the first great Italian diaspora. The Pederobbesi immigrants of this wave primarily emigrated to South and North America, and although many returned with wealth to provide for their families, many determined to remain and sent for their families to follow and relocate to these new worlds. Multiple Pederobba-specific surnames (cognome) flourish today in both North and South America.

The great World War, World War I, proved especially destructive for Pederobba, which was located at the Northern defensive front and faced multiple battles nearby. Following the Battle of Caporetto, Pederobba found itself at the front lines of the Piave and too close to the Grappa and Montello. Various monuments in Pederobba salute the perseverance, and give honor and salute the heroism and courage of the fallen. This includes the French ossuary. The devastation of this war again triggered emigration, now with the Pederobbisi emigrants looking to Oceania as well.

Following the Second World War and post-war period (1945 onward), Pederobba grew to become a main artisan and industrial center in the Grappa foothills.

== Demographic evolution ==
Historical population

Year	Pop.	±%
1861	?	—
1871	4,743	—
1881	4,647	−2.0%
1901	5,096	+9.7%
1911	5,959	+16.9%
1921	6,463	+8.5%

Year	Pop.	±%
1931	6,212	−3.9%
1936	5,764	−7.2%
1951	5,983	+3.8%
1961	5,568	−6.9%
1971	5,539	−0.5%
1981	5,934	+7.1%

Year	Pop.	±%
1991	6,517	+9.8%
2001	7,061	+8.3%
2011	7,262	+2.8%
2021	7,280	+0.2%

Source: Data from ISTAT

=== Foreign ethnicities and minorities ===
As of January 1st, 2025, foreigners residents in the municipality were 819, i.e. 11.2% of the population. The largest groups are shown below:

1. Morocco 197
2. China 180
3. Romania 136
4. Albania 53
5. North Macedonia 45
6. Ukraine 32
7. Brazil 29

== Economy ==
The local economy has not abandoned agriculture: cereals, vegetables, fodder, vines and orchards are grown. Breeding is also practiced, especially of cattle and poultry. The industrial sector is divided into the following sectors: textile, clothing, metallurgical, mechanical and construction. Typical products of the local gastronomy are: herb omelette, "soppressa" (sausage), polenta with "osei", Monfenera chestnuts.

== Infrastructure and transport ==
The SR 348 "Feltrina" passes through the municipality of Pederobba, connecting Treviso to Feltre. At Pederobba dalla Feltrina the "Valcavasia" road branches off which connects the town to Possagno and finally to Bassano del Grappa.

Pederobba is connected to the center of Montebelluna by the MOM bus line n.122: Montebelluna, Pederobba, Segusino, Valdobbiadene.

Within the municipal area, along the Padua-Calalzo railway line, there is the Pederobba station located near the municipality, which connects it to Belluno and Treviso. The Levada station, located in the hamlet of the same name, was a railway stop.

== Events ==
Since 1970, the "Mostra-Mercato Marroni del Monfenera" event has taken place every weekend in October, a typical product of the area which has been recognized with the I.G.P. brand. Thanks to this product, the municipality of Pederobba was present in the Italian pavilion for the entire duration of the international exhibition Expo Milano 2015.

== Twin towns ==
Pederobba is twinned with:

- Hettange-Grande, France, since 1982
- Jacutinga, Rio Grande do Sul, Brazil, since 2008

== See also ==
- Louis Leygue. War memorial
