= Crocetta del Montello =

- Comune
- Comune di Crocetta del Montello
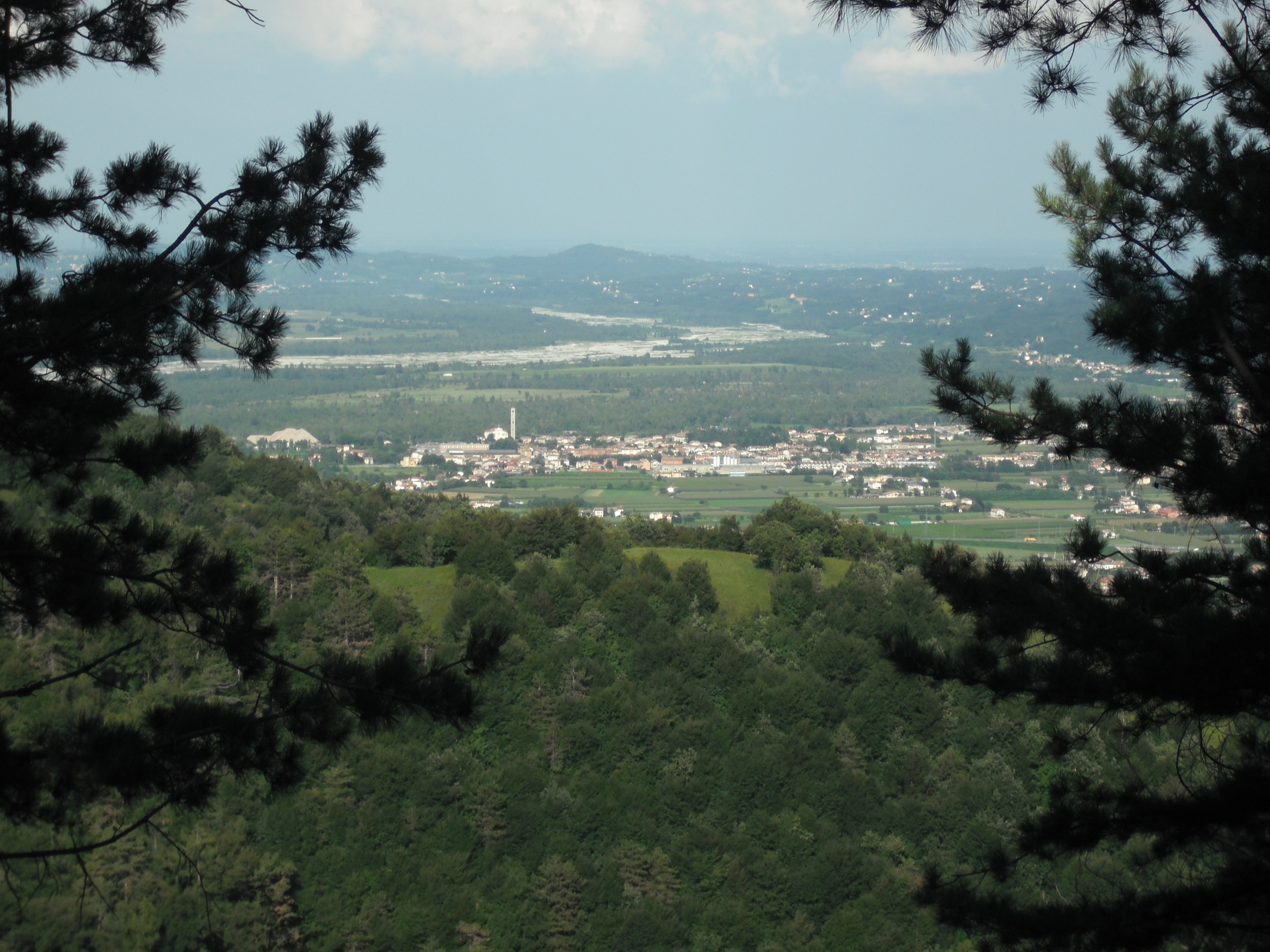
- Crocetta seen from Collalto

- Location within Italy Location within Veneto
- Coordinates: 45°50′N 12°2′E
- Country: Italy
- Region: Veneto
- Province: Province of Treviso (TV)
- Frazioni: Ciano, Nogaré

Government
  - Mayor: Marianella Tormena (lista civica - LN)

Area
  - Total: 26.4 km^{2} (10.2 sq mi)
- Elevation: 148 m (486 ft)

Population (Dec. 2025)
  - Total: 6,074
  - Density: 230/km^{2} (596/sq mi)
- Demonym(s): Crocettans; Crocettani (Italian); Crosetani (Venetian)
- Time zone: UTC+1 (CET)
  - Summer (DST): UTC+2 (CEST)
- Postal code: 31035
- Dialing code: 0423
- Website: Comune di Crocetta del Montello

Crocetta del Montello (or Croseta del Montel in the local Venetian dialect), formerly Crocetta Trevigiana, is a comune (municipality) in the province of Treviso, in the Italian region of Veneto, located about 50 kilometres (31 mi) northwest of Venice and about 25 kilometres (16 mi) northwest of Treviso. As of 31 December 2025, it had a population of 6,074 and an area of 26.4 square kilometres (10.2 mi^{2}).

The town lies about 3 kilometres (2 mi) southwest of the Piave river, and borders the municipalities of Cornuda, Montebelluna, Moriago della Battaglia, Pederobba, Vidor, and Volpago del Montello. The present name literally means "Little Cross of the Little Hill", and refers to the Montello, an isolated hillock, 5 by 13 kilometres (3 by 8 mi) in size and 371 metres (1,217 ft) in elevation, that rises from the Piave's alluvial plain at the west edge of the town.

== History ==
=== Prehistory and antiquity ===
Traces of human occupation dating from the Mesolithic have been found along the north-east edge of the Montello, above the boroughs of Ciano and Santa Margherita, which at the time were on the Piave river. The main finds are chipped stone tools that appear to be fishing spear points.

Ciano takes its name from an ancient Roman temple devoted to the cult of Cyane. The temple's focus was the Buoro di Ciano spring, which presently lies at the end of a 10-metre (33 ft) long grotto, and whose water was reputed to be beneficial to the health.

=== Rural beginnings ===
In the Middle Ages the temple was replaced by a chapel dedicated to Saint Mamertus, patron of harvest.

Up to the 11th century, the area was still a sparsely settled woodland, plagued by lack of water and periodic flooding by the Piave. In the 15th century the Brentella Canal] or Bretella Canal (Brantea in Venetian) was built to draw irrigation water from the Piave. The Bentella, which presently bisects the town in the north–south direction alongside Via Gugliemo Marconi and via Erizzo, was to become a major landmark and economic benesse for Crocetta and its surrounds three centuries later.

After Republic of Venice turned the Montello into an off-limits timber reserve, the displaced hunters and woodsmen who used to live there became a class of landless, homeless and jobless miserables, the bisnenti, who survived on odd jobs and occasionally crimes.

By the beginning of the 19th century, the area was occupied by a few large manorial properties belonging to the Venetian nobility, many small family farms producing wheat, maize, rye and oats, and a few small vineyards on the hill slopes. Some wickerwork was produced at Ciano, and the town had a few smiths and coopers. A sawmill, powered by the Brentella, operated near Via Rimembranza.

In the second half of the 19th century, silk production became popular across northern Italy, and the raising of silkworms became an option for local farmers. The first silk spinning shop, the Filanda Marcato Ancilotto, was established in 1870.

=== The Canapificio Veneto ===
In 1882, Andrea Antonini, who owned a hemp rope mill in Venice, joined with fellow businessmen Pacifico Ceresa and Angelo Zorzetto to build the Canapificio Veneto Antonini Ceresa, on the west bank of the Brentella, which opened its doors in May 1883. The Canapificio dominated the town's economy for more than seven decades (1882–1958), and Antonini, its main owner and manager, became one of the most influential personalities in the town's history.

The first workers were recruited among the bisenti, but as the mill grew it attracted workers from the neighboring towns as well. Antonini sponsored the construction of popular housing for those workers along Via Sant'Anna (1890) and Piazza Cadorna (1896), and the establishment of basic services.

The first two electricity generators of the town, driven by the Brentella, were installed in 1883 by the Canapificio.

Antonini first had his own residence built inside the Canapificio, but in 1898 he started the construction of a new house, Villa Antonini, which is now a landmark of Crocetta. His old residence became the worker's ballroom.

=== Independence from Cornuda ===
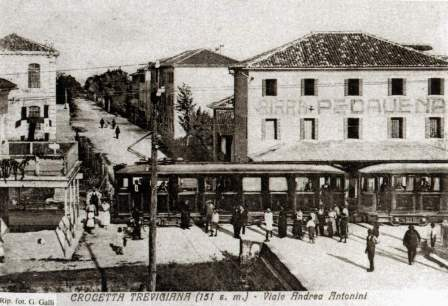
Crocetta - tram station

Throughout the 19th century, Crocetta was only a suburb of the municipality of Cornuda. It only became an independent municipality on July 2, 1902, by detaching the hamlets Ciano and Nogarè. The split was an initiative of Lodovico Boschieri, then mayor of Cornuda, who became the first mayor of Crocetta.

In the years following the split, Crocetta gained a post office, an asylum, a pharmacy, a barber shop, a cooperative drugstore, and an aqueduct. Schools were opened at some of its boroughs. A dormitory for the girls who worked on the silk mill was also built at that time. Antonini himself established a semi-industrial bakery and a spinnery in Crocetta (1904), a brick kiln at Ciano (1905), and a lime kiln at Crocetta (1910). Another electric plant was built upstream at Croce del Gallo, and a third one downstream from the Canapificio (1911).

A worker's union (the Società Operaia di Mutuo Soccorso, "Worker's Society for Mutual Help"), was established in 1910. In 1913, workers went on a 20-day worker's strike for better living conditions, which ended with a promise by Antonini to build a professional school.

=== Between the two wars ===
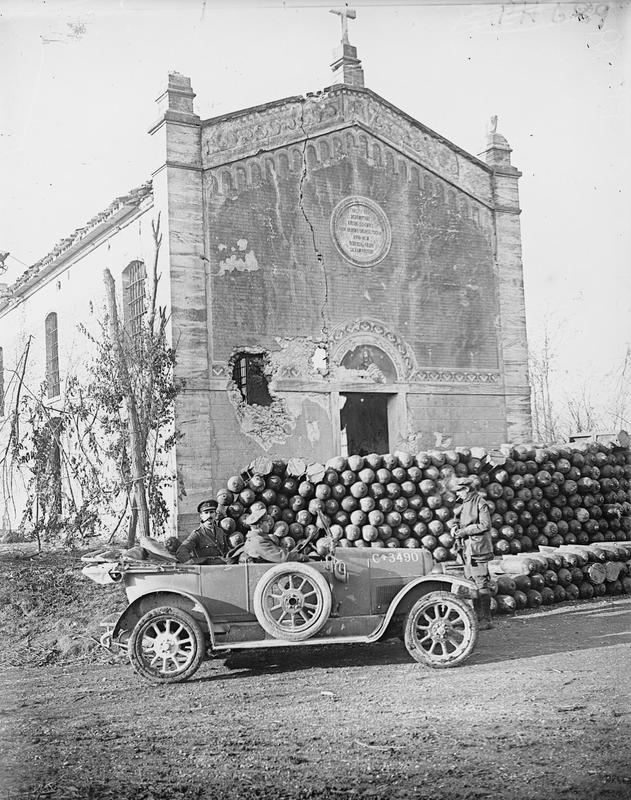
Mortar shells outside Ciano Church during World War One.

Crocetta found itself on the front line of World War I. The Montello hill was the stage of the Battle of the Solstice between Italian and Austro-Hungarian troops (June 15–23, 1918). Many buildings were destroyed or heavily damaged, including the Canapificio and all the town's churches.

In the years after the war, some of the local business gradually resumed their activities, including the Canapificio. In 1920 a merger turned it into the Linificio e Canapificio Nazionale, with Ceresa as one of the directors, while Antonini chose to sell all its holdings. Crocetta's bakery and lime kiln, however, closed their doors.

The town's original name Crocetta Trevigiana was changed in 1928 by the Benito Mussolini government, to honor the soldiers who died fighting for control of the Montello hill during World War I. An orphanage, the Orfanotrofio Pontello, was built in the same year.

Over the following decade, the fascist regime took control of all freetime activities of the country's population through its Opera Nazionale Dopolavoro ("National Leisure Organization"), or OND. At Crocetta, the OND took over the Arts and Crafts school as its local headquarters. In 1935, the regime turned the Anonini Cultural Center into the Casa del Fascio ("House of Fascism").

Crocetta was badly hit by the global economic turmoil between the two World Wars, especially by the downturns of 1922 (the Post-World War I recession), 1927 (the Great Depression), 1933, and 1938. The Canapificio gradually reduced its operations and finally closed its doors in 1938, leaving many people without a job and triggering the bankruptcy of many local business that depended on it.

=== The Second World War ===
The first years of World War II affected Crocetta only indirectly, by conscription and shortages. However, after the Allies landed in southern Italy and fascism retreated to the Republic of Salo, Crocetta found itself again in the crossfire. Allied bombing, resistance guerrillas and German reprisals took a heavy toll on the town and its inhabitants.

== Geography ==
Since the 19th century, the main access roads to the region were the Treviso- Feltre road (now the SR-348 regional highway), and the Via Erizzo road, built in 1817 (now the SP-2 provincial road).

The main road east from central Crocetta begins as Via Lodovico Boschieri and continues along the northern edge of the Montello; it eventually turns south and reaches Nervesa della Battaglia as Via Decima SAS. It is locally known as the Panoramic Road for its views of the Piave valley. Along that road lie the eastern suburbs of Crocetta: Ciano (about 1.5 km), Botteselle (3 km), Sant'Urbano (3.5 km), Santa Margherita (4.0 km) and Santa Mama (4.5 km).

Centuries ago, Ciano and Santa Margherita were ports on the Piave, but the river has since shifted its course and now runs 2 km to the northwest of Ciano. To preserve their water supply, the Brentella was tapped near the borough of Croce del Gallo to create the Costelviero Canal, that runs along the Panoramic Road.

Westwards from central Crocetta, Via Lodovico Boschieri becomes Via Sant'Andrea and leads to the borough of Nogarè (2.5 km) and then to the Padova Industrial District (3.5 km).

Due to its position across the valley that connects Cornuda and Valdobiaddene at the north to Montebelluna, Treviso, and Venice in the southwest, Crocetta today suffers from heavy through-traffic that severely strains the local roads.

== Monuments and places of interest ==
=== Venetian villas ===
Villa Ancilotto: in 1965 the Municipality of Crocetta del Montello purchased the assets of the Villa Ancilotto complex. Today the spinning mill houses the primary and secondary school, while the old family residence houses the municipal library on the ground floor, the "Earth and Man" Civic Museum on the second floor and the temporary exhibitions on the main floor.

== Culture ==
Crocetta del Montello has a very interesting civic museum, which houses a prehistoric horn of Mammoth and a small dinosaur skeleton, as well as many other archaeological finds. The museum was opened to the public in 1978 with the contribution of numerous archeology scholars, including prof. Giuliano Palmieri, teacher of Greek and Latin at the Antonio Canova state high school in Treviso until the early 2000s.

== Economics ==
In the space of twenty years, from 1965 to 1985, thanks to the resourcefulness and intelligence of many entrepreneurs, about a hundred artisanal and industrial companies, including medium-large ones, entered the productive fabric of the Municipality, some of which are very significant: a dozen shoe factories, four to five mechanical companies, four packaging companies, three wineries, and others in the canning sector and in the industrial machinery sector. Today, Crocetta's economy is based on a network of family agriculture, small industries and services. Gravel and limestone are produced in the area. The town also benefits indirectly from wine production in nearby hills, notably the Prosecco from Valdobbiadene.

== Demographic evolution ==
Historical population

Year	Pop.	±%
1861	?	—
1871	2,852	—
1881	3,089	+8.3%
1901	4,160	+34.7%
1911	5,979	+43.7%
1921	6,151	+2.9%

Year	Pop.	±%
1931	6,134	−0.3%
1936	5,798	−5.5%
1951	5,935	+2.4%
1961	5,573	−6.1%
1971	5,662	+1.6%
1981	5,748	+1.5%

Year	Pop.	±%
1991	5,662	−1.5%
2001	5,709	+0.8%
2011	6,018	+5.4%
2021	6,057	+0.6%

Source: Data from ISTAT

=== Foreign ethnicities and minorities ===
As of January 1st, 2025, foreigners residents in the municipality were 714, i.e. 11.8% of the population.The largest groups are shown below:

1. Morocco: 138
2. Albania: 130
3. China: 101
4. Romania: 94
5. Macedonia: 58
6. Ucraina: 41

== Administration ==
Period		Office holder	Party	Title	Notes
8 luglio 1985	20 luglio 1990	Dario Bonora	DC	Mayor	
20 luglio 1990	21 novembre 1994	Sisinio Narduzzo	DC	Mayor	
21 novembre 1994	24 aprile 1995	Claudio Bianchin	DC	Mayor	
24 aprile 1995	14 giugno 1999	Giancarlo Fritz	lista civica	Mayor	
14 giugno 1999	14 giugno 2004	Giancarlo Fritz	lista civica	Mayor	
14 giugno 2004	8 giugno 2009	Eugenio Mazzocato	centro-sinistra (liste civiche)	Mayor	
8 giugno 2009	26 maggio 2014	Eugenio Mazzocato	PdL -Lega Nord	Mayor	
10 giugno 2014	in carica	Marianella Tormena	lista civica La civica	Mayor	
