= Jacutinga =

Jacutinga may refer to:

== Biology ==
- Black-fronted piping guan, or jacutinga, a New World bird

== Places ==
- Jacutinga, Minas Gerais Brazil
- Jacutinga, Rio Grande do Sul, Brazil
- Santa Rita de Jacutinga, Minas Gerais, Brazil
