= Moriago della Battaglia =

- Comune
- Comune di Moriago della Battaglia
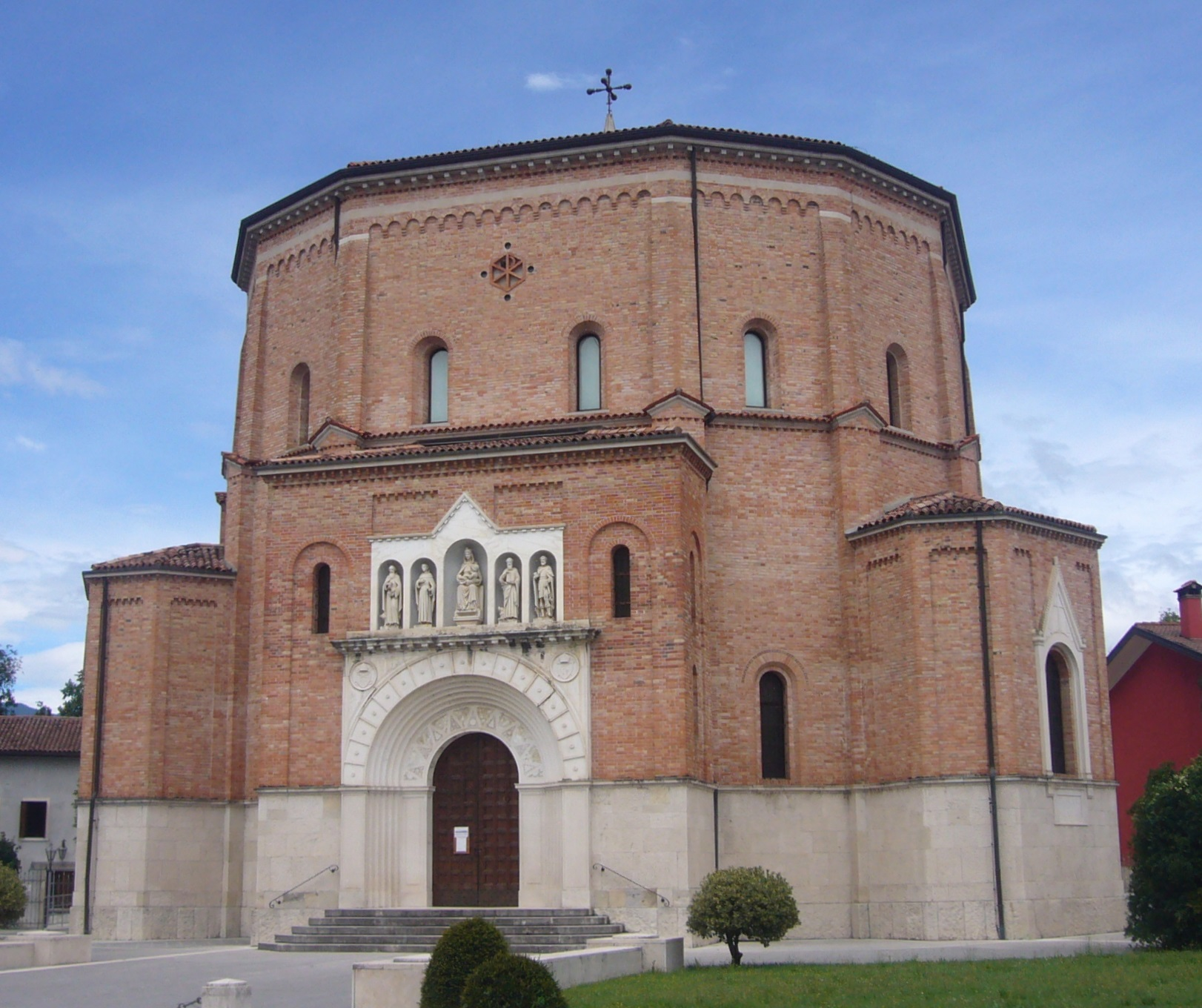
- The parish church of San Leonardo

- Coat of arms

- The municipal territory in the province of Treviso.

- Location within Italy Location within Veneto
- Coordinates: 45°52′N 12°6′E
- Country: Italy
- Region: Veneto
- Province: Treviso (TV)
- Frazioni: Mosnigo

Government
  - Mayor: Giuseppe Tonello (Lega Nord)

Area
  - Total: 13.9 km^{2} (5.4 sq mi)

Population (31 December 2022)
  - Total: 2,825
  - Density: 203/km^{2} (526/sq mi)
- Demonym: Moriaghesi
- Time zone: UTC+1 (CET)
  - Summer (DST): UTC+2 (CEST)
- Postal code: 31010
- Dialing code: 0438
- Website: Official website

Moriago della Battaglia is a comune (municipality) in the Province of Treviso in the Italian region Veneto, located about 50 kilometres (31 mi) northwest of Venice and about 25 kilometres (16 mi) northwest of Treviso.

Moriago della Battaglia borders the following municipalities: Crocetta del Montello, Farra di Soligo, Sernaglia della Battaglia, Vidor, Volpago del Montello. The town takes its name from the position it had during World War I, when it was on the front of the Battle of the Piave.

== Physical geography ==
The municipal territory extends north of the left bank of the Piave river. Another watercourse that bathes the Moriago area is the Raboso stream.

== History ==
The town was mentioned for the first time in 1112 as Murliago. In the Middle Ages there was feudalization of the area, but from the thirteenth century the local lordships renounced their rights by ceding sovereignty to the Municipality of Treviso. In the same period, the friars of the monastery of Vidor undertook an important reclamation of the territory.

Passed to the Serenissima, Moriago was subjected to nearby Vidor for a long time. In 1807, under Napoleon, today's commune was established, however in 1810 it was suppressed and aggregated again to Vidor.It regained its autonomy in 1819, during the Austrian government. As the town's name suggests, it suffered the destruction of the Great War as it was located along the Piave front. From this period it is worth mentioning the heroic feat of 27 October 1918 when the troops of the XXIII Army Corps, under the orders of General Giuseppe Vaccari, they managed to cross the river and break through the enemy lines at what was later called the Island of the Dead. This event set the stage for the final battle of Vittorio Veneto.

== Monuments and places of interest ==
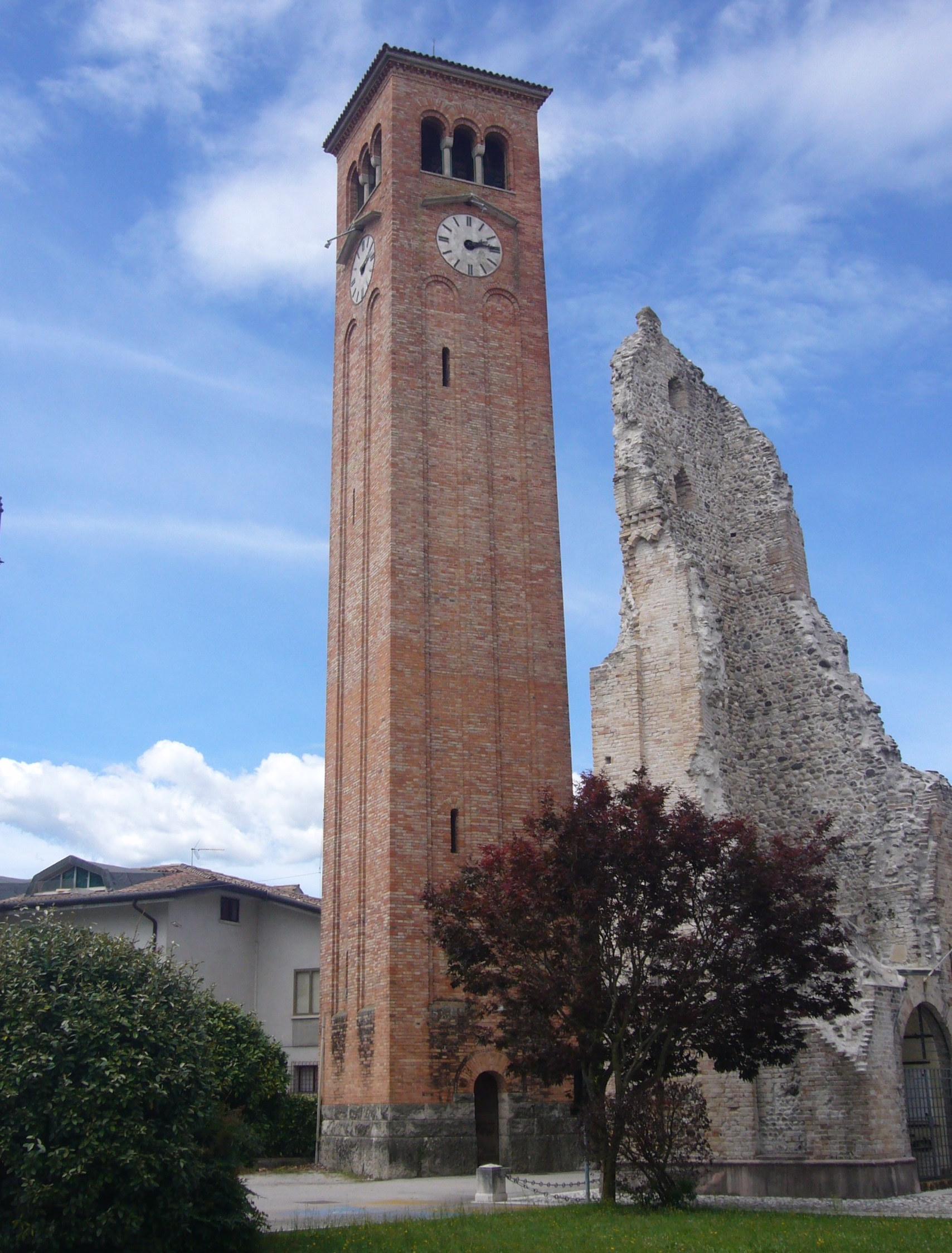
The bell tower of the parish church of San Leonardo

- Parish church

The dedication to St. Leonard of Limoges places its origin before the tenth century, during the rule of the Franks. We know that at the beginning of the twelfth century it was subordinate to the abbey of Vidor, while in 1375 it was elevated to a rectory dependent on the parish of Sernaglia. The parish was established in 1569.

The current building was erected in the years 1922-1925 to replace the previous eighteenth-century church destroyed during the Great War. Designed by Alberto Alpago Novello and consecrated in 1928 by Bishop Eugenio Beccegato, it preserves on the high altar a valuable altarpiece by Pordenone spared from the fighting. The interior decorations of the dome are the work of Guido Cadorin, who collaborated first with Giovanni Zanzotto and then with Astolfo de Maria.

- Mushroom House

This is the nickname of a futuristic building in Via dei Zanin designed by Dante Vendramini, a moriagotto engineer who had worked in France at Dassault Aviation. After Vendramini's death, it was completed by the current owner Lorella Zanetton.

The house is built with techniques and materials typical of the aerospace industry and is based on a system of modules with a reinforced concrete structure, covered with composite material panels. A fundamental feature is precisely the "mushroom" shape given by the overlapping of the two floors, both with a circular plan with the upper one being wider.

== Culture ==
- Events

The 7th edition of the Festival of Culture took place under the sign of "variety", or difference and multiplicity from October 2023 until June 2024 at the Casa del Musichiere. Variety equals diversity, heterogeneity, and therefore richness. So many proposals, ideas and reflections to read the present and act. Meetings, painting, illustration, photography, ceramics and sculpture are the visual arts that alternated in the beautiful "Carlo Conte" exhibition hall of the municipal library.

== Demographic evolution ==
Historical population

| Year | Pop. | ±% |
|---|---|---|
| 1861 | ? | — |
| 1871 | 1,922 | — |
| 1881 | 2,133 | +11.0% |
| 1901 | 2,098 | −1.6% |
| 1911 | 2,551 | +21.6% |
| 1921 | 2,571 | +0.8% |

| Year | Pop. | ±% |
|---|---|---|
| 1931 | 2,617 | +1.8% |
| 1936 | 2,227 | −14.9% |
| 1951 | 2,301 | +3.3% |
| 1961 | 2,044 | −11.2% |
| 1971 | 2,023 | −1.0% |
| 1981 | 2,295 | +13.4% |

| Year | Pop. | ±% |
|---|---|---|
| 1991 | 2,412 | +5.1% |
| 2001 | 2,639 | +9.4% |
| 2011 | 2,776 | +5.2% |
| 2021 | 2,783 | +0.3% |

Source: Data from ISTAT

=== Foreign ethnicities and minorities ===
As of December 31, 2022, foreigners residents in the municipality were 365, i.e. 12.9% of the population. The largest groups are shown below:

1. Morocco 121
2. North Macedonia 72
3. China 52
4. Albania 22
5. Romania 11

== Economy ==
The economy of the municipality is linked to agriculture, livestock and the furniture industry. The agricultural area is renowned for the production of potatoes and it is worth mentioning the Potato Exhibition, at the beginning of August, with tastings and lunches based on potatoes, from cake to pizza, which every year attracts many curious and enthusiasts.
