= Rohr in Niederbayern =

Rohr i.NB
- Municipality
- Coat of arms

- Location of Rohr i.NB within Kelheim district
- Interactive map of Rohr i.NB
- Location within Germany Location within Bavaria
- Coordinates: 48°46′N 11°58′E
- Country: Germany
- State: Bavaria
- Admin. region: Lower Bavaria
- District: Kelheim
- Subdivisions: 15 Ortsteile

Government
  - Mayor (2020–26): Birgit Steinsdorfer (CSU)

Area
  - Total: 54.12 km^{2} (20.90 sq mi)
- Elevation: 426 m (1,398 ft)

Population (2025-12-31)
  - Total: 3,495
  - Density: 64.58/km^{2} (167.3/sq mi)
- Time zone: UTC+01:00 (CET)
  - Summer (DST): UTC+02:00 (CEST)
- Postal codes: 93352
- Dialling codes: 08783
- Vehicle registration: KEH
- Website: www.markt-rohr.de

Rohr in Niederbayern (German pronunciation: [ˈʁoːɐ̯ ʔɪn ˈniːdɐˌbaɪɐn], lit. 'Rohr in Lower Bavaria') is a municipality in the district of Kelheim in Bavaria in Germany.

== Twin towns ==
Rohr in Niederbayern is twinned with:

- Castelcucco, Italy, since 2003
