= Possagno =

- Comune
- Comune di Possagno
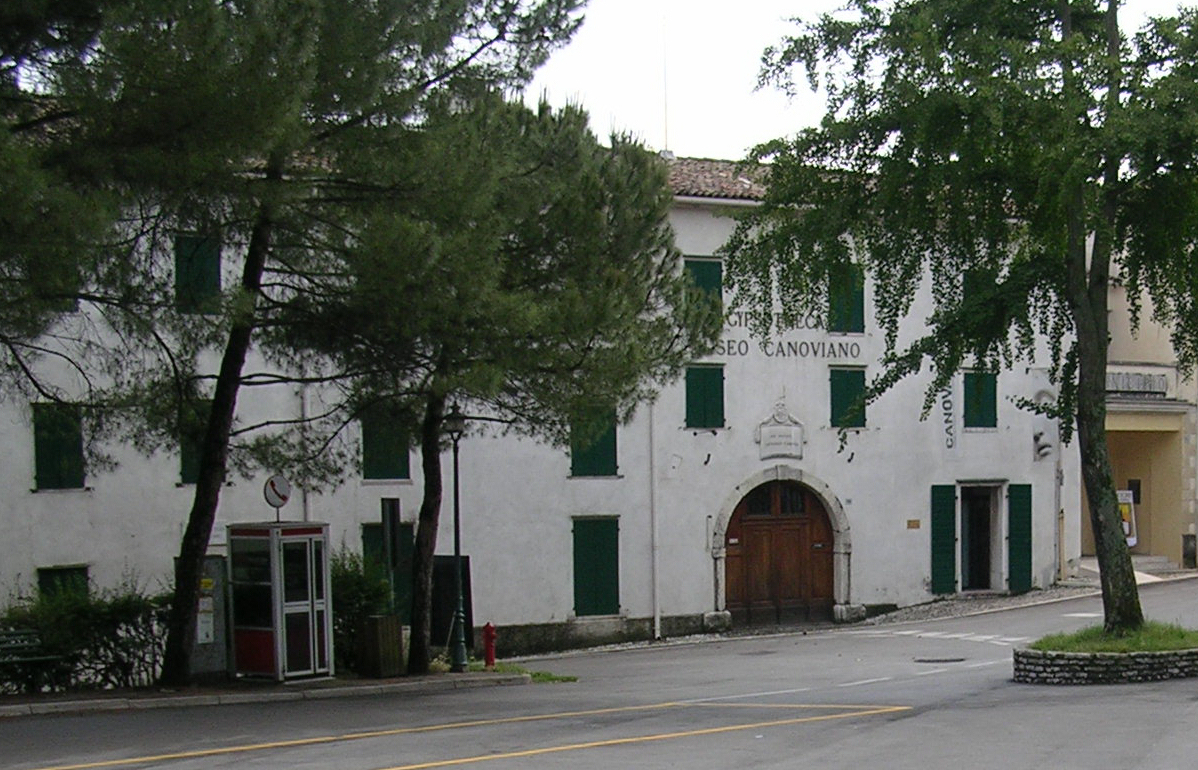
- Museo Canoviano, dedicated to the work of Antonio Canova

- Location within Italy Location within Veneto
- Coordinates: 45°51′N 11°53′E
- Country: Italy
- Region: Veneto
- Province: Treviso (TV)

Area
  - Total: 12.1 km^{2} (4.7 sq mi)
- Elevation: 335 m (1,099 ft)

Population (Dec. 2021)
  - Total: 2,215
  - Density: 183/km^{2} (474/sq mi)
- Demonym: Possagnotti
- Time zone: UTC+1 (CET)
  - Summer (DST): UTC+2 (CEST)
- Postal code: 31054
- Dialing code: 0423
- Website: Official website

Possagno is a comune in the Province of Treviso, in the Italian region Veneto. It is located about 60 kilometres (37 mi) northwest of Venice and about 35 kilometres (22 mi) northwest of Treviso. As of 31 August 2021, it had a population of 2,215 and an area of 12.1 square kilometres (4.7 mi^{2}).

Possagno borders the municipalities of Castelcucco, Cavaso del Tomba, Pieve del Grappa, and Setteville.

== History ==
Since the end of the 18th century, the history of the municipality has been linked to the famous name of Antonio Canova, of whose works the Canova Temple stands out, a church designed by the sculptor inspired by the Pantheon in Rome, and the Canova Gipsoteca, a collection of casts and plaster casts in the house of the artist.

Antonio Canova (1757-1822), the great neoclassical sculptor was born in Possagno. He chose to erect the Tempio Canoviano in the city, a structure he designed, financed, and partly-built himself. The temple has become one of the city's landmarks with the museum of the Gipsoteca Canoviana dedicated to the sculptor and built around his birthplace, which houses various sketches and plaster casts of his famous works as well as many of his paintings. The extension of the plaster casts gallery was carried out by the architect Carlo Scarpa.

In 2022, the locals have celebrated the 200th anniversary of the death of Antonio Canova, which took place in Venice on 13 October 1822, considered one of the greatest exponent of Neoclassicism in sculpture and, for this reason, nicknamed “the new Phidias”. The organizational machine foresees special exhibitions and restorations, between Possagno, Canova's hometown and Bassano del Grappa, which together represent one of the most important “Canova center” in the world.

== Economy ==
Possagno also played a role during the national reconstruction: the kilns were created in the municipality which, exploiting the clay from the nearby hills, managed to produce bricks for the whole of Italy, exporting 80% of their production. The main sources of income are agriculture, in fact cereals, fodder, vines and fruit trees are grown. Breeding is also practiced, especially of cattle and poultry. Typical products are herb omelette, "soppressa" (sausage), polenta (with "osei" or cod, etc.) and chestnuts. The industry includes companies operating in the footwear, building materials, metal and furniture sectors. The brick kilns have a long tradition: they were mentioned as early as 1600.

== Culture ==
- Education
- Cavanis "Canova" Institute: founded in 1857 at the behest of Bishop Giovanni Battista Sartori, brother of Antonio Canova, it is one of the oldest and most renowned schools in Italy and in the area. Managed by the Congregation of Charity Schools (CSCh.), Its former students include Mario Moretti Polegato, founder and CEO of Geox, and singer Francesca Michielin, winner of the 5th edition of X Factor and runner-up at the 66th edition of the Sanremo Festival.
- Events
- "Sagra of San Rocco", patron saint of the municipality (which falls on August 16) very popular and currently the most important religious event in Possagno. On foot you reach the Church of San Rocco which is located just west of the Tempio Canova along a steep road flanked by tall cypresses and the capitals of the street Crucis donated in 1909 by Pope Pio X.
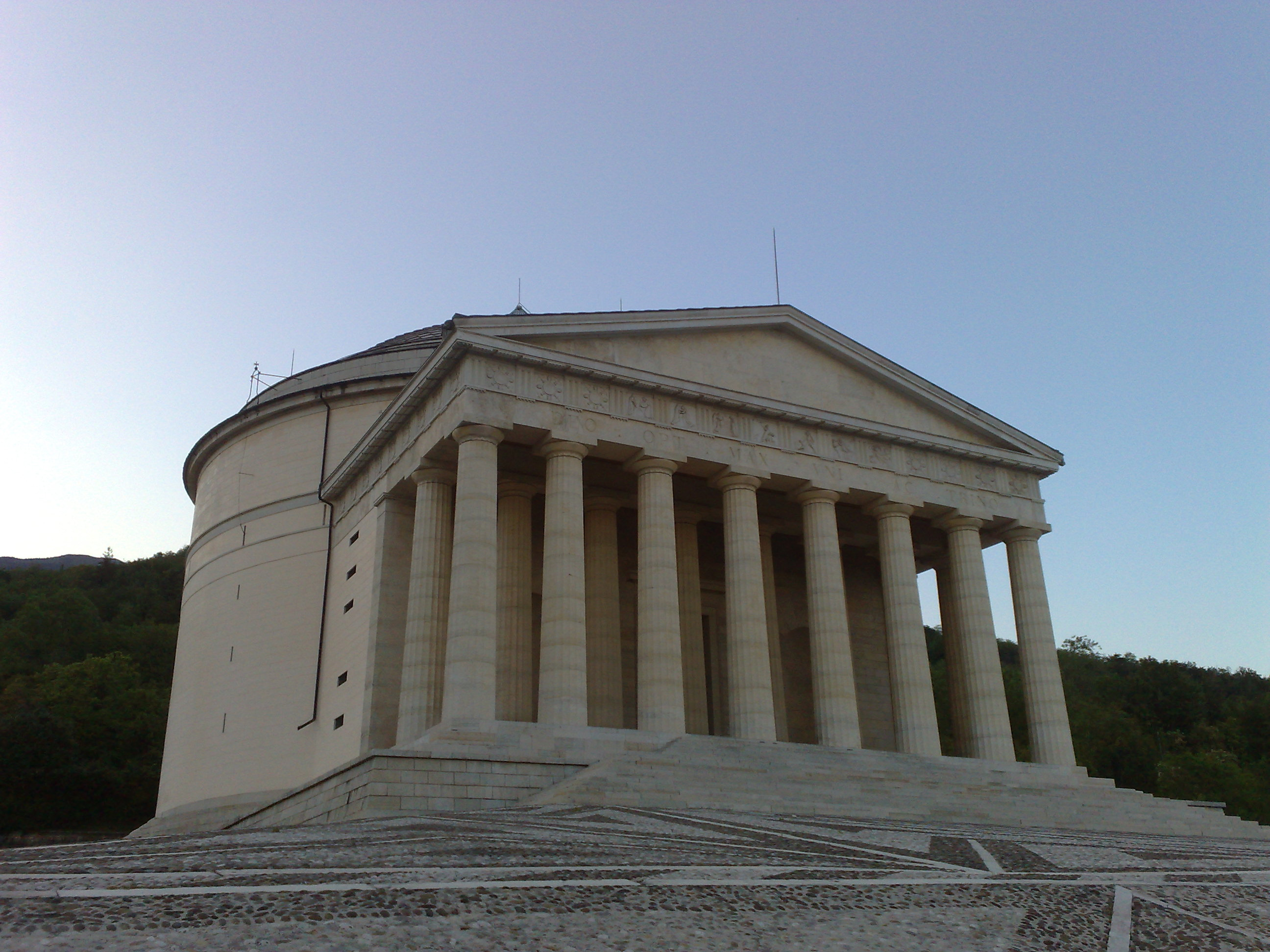
Tempio Canoviano (1830)

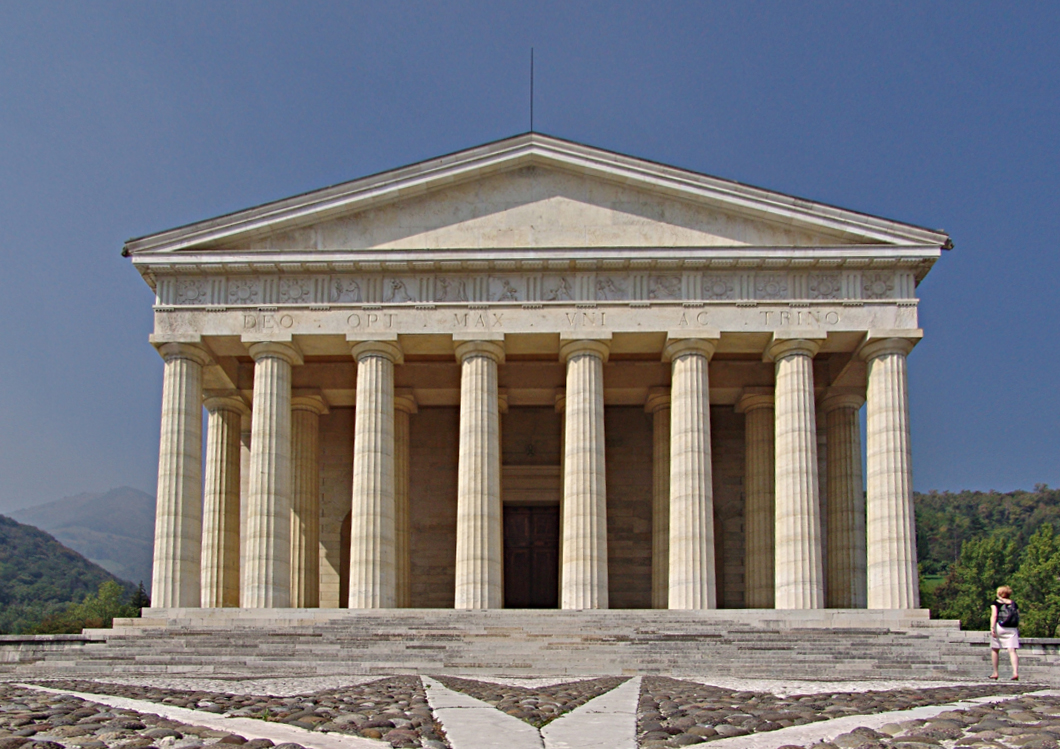

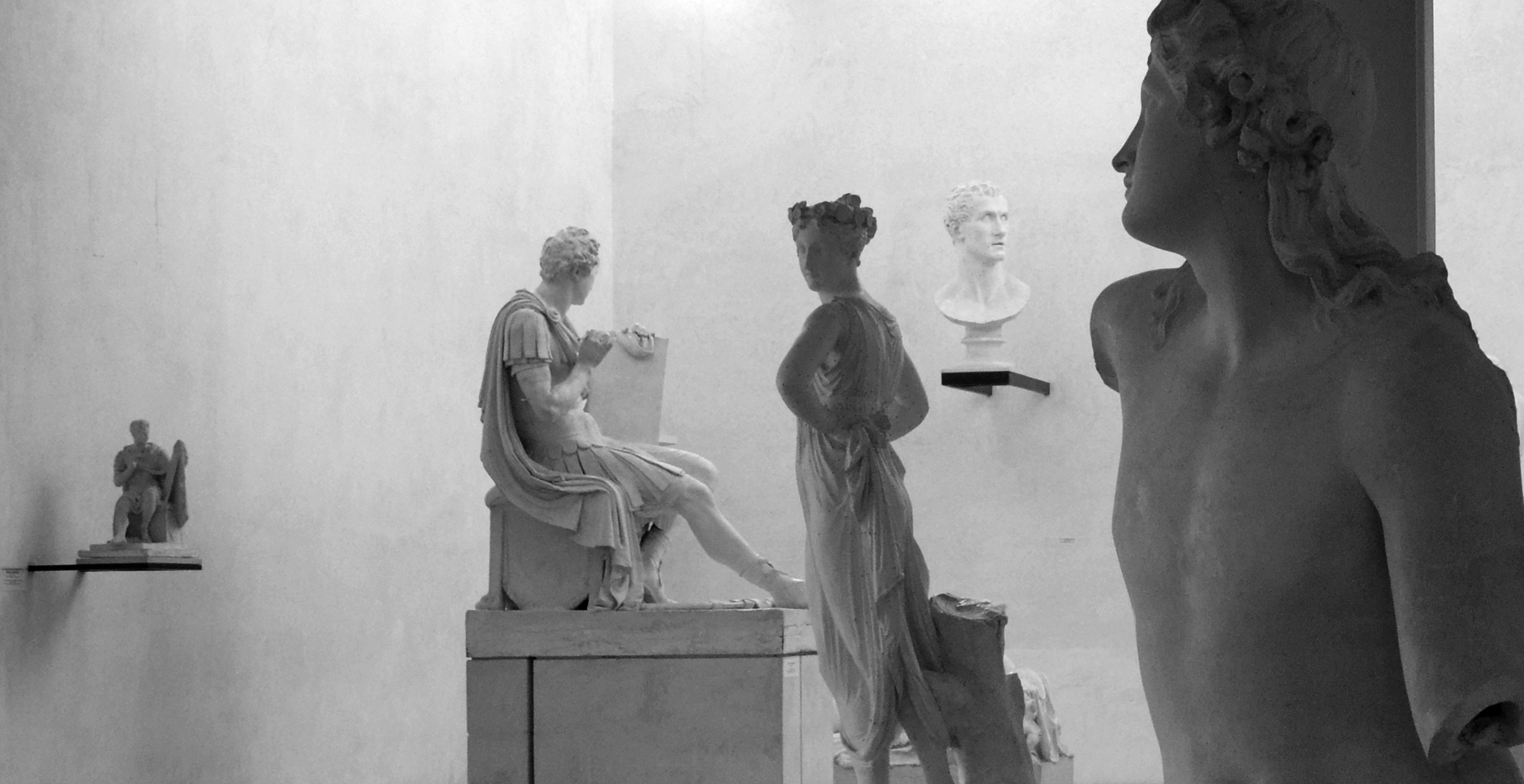
Gipsoteca Canoviana

== Demographic evolution ==
Historical population

Year	Pop.	±%
1861	?	—
1871	1,754	—
1881	1,835	+4.6%
1901	2,107	+14.8%
1911	2,384	+13.1%
1921	2,448	+2.7%

Year	Pop.	±%
1931	2,174	−11.2%
1936	2,019	−7.1%
1951	1,991	−1.4%
1961	1,935	−2.8%
1971	1,895	−2.1%
1981	1,828	−3.5%

Year	Pop.	±%
1991	1,828	+0.0%
2001	2,029	+11.0%
2011	2,195	+8.2%
2021	2,215	+0.9%

Source: Data from ISTAT

=== Foreign ethnicities and minorities ===
As of December 31, 2022, foreigners residents in the municipality were 368, i.e. 16.3% of the population. The largest groups are shown below:

1. Morocco 96
2. North Macedonia 83
3. Albania 44
4. Romania 44
5. Senegal 23

== Infrastructure and transport ==
At Pederobba, the "Valcavasia" road branches off from the Feltrina road, connecting the town to Possagno and in turn connected to the center of Montebelluna by the MOM line n.191: Montebelluna-Pederobba-Cavaso-Maser-Montebelluna.
