= Monfumo =

- Comune
- Comune di Monfumo
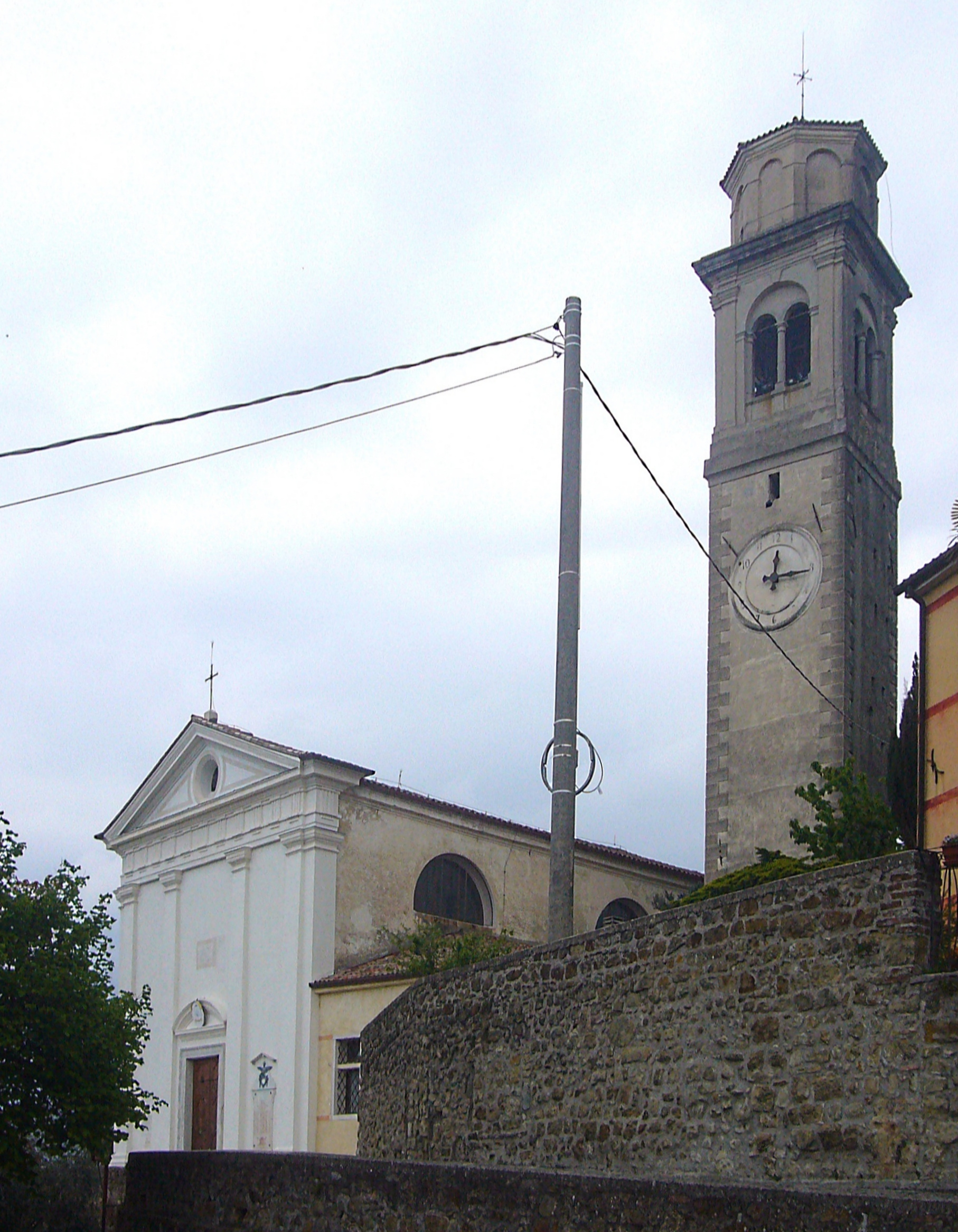
- The Church of St. Nicholas the Bishop

- The municipal territory in the province of Treviso

- Location within Italy Location within Veneto
- Coordinates: 45°50′N 11°55′E
- Country: Italy
- Region: Veneto
- Province: Province of Treviso (TV)

Area
  - Total: 11.45 km^{2} (4.42 sq mi)

Population (Dec. 2022)
  - Total: 1,309
  - Density: 114.3/km^{2} (296.1/sq mi)
- Time zone: UTC+1 (CET)
  - Summer (DST): UTC+2 (CEST)
- Postal code: 31010
- Dialing code: 0423
- Website: Official website

Monfumo is a comune (municipality) in the Province of Treviso in the Italian region Veneto, located about 50 kilometres (31 mi) northwest of Venice and about 30 kilometres (19 mi) northwest of Treviso. As of 31 December 2022, it had a population of 1,309 and an area of 11.45 square kilometres (4.42 mi^{2}).

Monfumo borders the following municipalities: Asolo, Castelcucco, Cavaso del Tomba, Cornuda, Maser, Pederobba.

== History ==
At the beginning of the twelfth century, each hamlet constituted a fief gravitating around the municipality of Treviso: the Maltraversi family (also known as Monfumo) settled in Monfumo and the homonymous family settled in Castelli. The two families lived in their respective fortresses, which were to be built where the parish churches of the villages are located today.

Maltraversi and da Castelli were linked to the Ghibelline faction and in the thirteenth century they sided with the Scaligeri opposing the Guelphs represented by the Caminesi and the bishops of Feltre and Treviso. Their defeat, however, was sanctioned by the conquest of the Serenissima, which abolished the fiefdoms by establishing the podesteria of Asolo, governed by Venetian rectors.

Today's municipality of Monfumo was established in 1810 during the Napoleonic domination, separating the territory from that of Asolo. In 1928 the institution was suppressed and re-aggregated to Asolo, and then definitively returned to autonomy in 1945.

== Demographic evolution ==
Historical population

Year	Pop.	±%
1861	?	—
1871	1,311	—
1881	1,356	+3.4%
1901	1,382	+1.9%
1911	1,769	+28.0%
1921	1,900	+7.4%

Year	Pop.	±%
1931	1,741	−8.4%
1936	1,751	+0.6%
1951	1,711	−2.3%
1961	1,403	−18.0%
1971	1,200	−14.5%
1981	1,329	+10.7%

Year	Pop.	±%
1991	1,381	+3.9%
2001	1,428	+3.4%
2011	1,439	+0.8%
2021	1,315	−8.6%

Source: Data from ISTAT

== Foreign ethnicities and minorities ==
As of December 31, 2023, there were 31 foreigners residing in the municipality, or 2.4% of the population (the lowest percentage in the province).

== Economy ==
Until 15–20 years ago, Monfumo, considered the hilly structure of the territory, was an almost entirely agricultural village with an economy based mainly on the breeding of dairy cows and the cultivation of vineyards. Subsequently, agricultural activity began to decline more and more rapidly, until the present moment marks a deep crisis. The abandonment of agricultural activity was essentially caused by the morphological character of the territory which, being totally hilly, involves enormous difficulties in the management of the land and in particular disadvantages the Municipality compared to other agricultural realities that rely on mechanization.

Due to the small population and the lack of significant centres, commercial activity is very limited. There are 15 local units dedicated to commerce, employing an average of 21 people. The public establishments that practice catering are a good reference for the farmhouse attracted by the landscape and the particularly suggestive environment. There is also a large multi-purpose disco with a range of different musical genres. Finally, Monfumo offers excellent food and handicraft products such as chestnuts, wine, cheeses, apples, honey, mushrooms and various handicrafts.

In 2009, the Slow Food Association of Montello and Colli Asolani made contact with the Municipality and the Pro Loco of Monfumo to propose the resumption of the "ancient apples" project, highlighting the importance of the recovery of ancient apple varieties in an economic and cultural context that is as topical as ever. In collaboration with the Parolini Agricultural Institute of Bassano del Grappa and Veneto Agricoltura, 18 varieties of apples were identified and assigned to local producers for their reintroduction and cultivation. At the end of September, the "apple festival" is organized, a market exhibition of handicrafts and the sale of apple products, which attracts visitors and nature enthusiasts.
