= Castelcucco =

- Comune
- Comune di Castelcucco
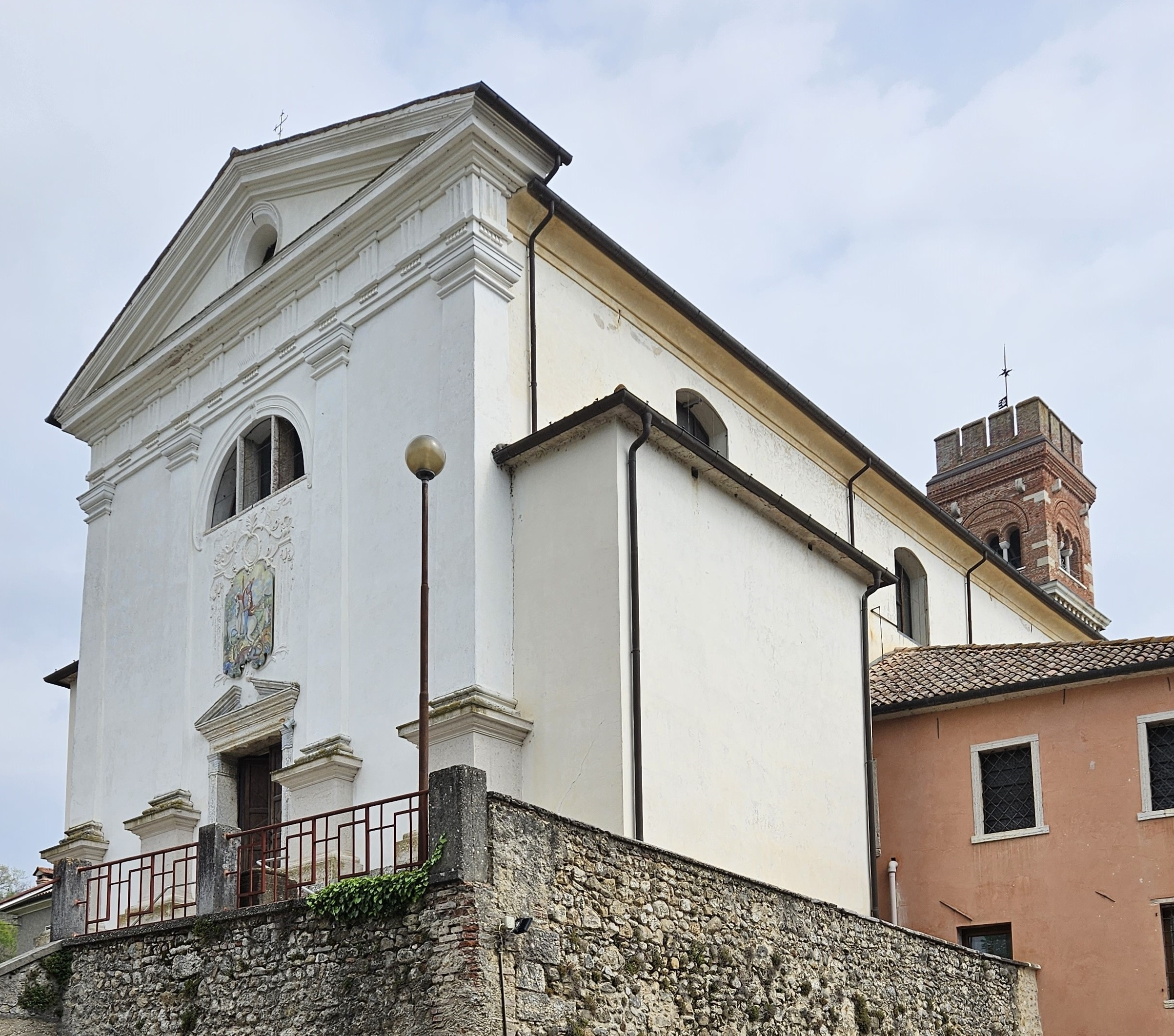
- Church of San Giorgio Martire

- The municipal territory in the province of Treviso

- Location within Italy Location within Veneto
- Coordinates: 45°50′N 11°53′E
- Country: Italy
- Region: Veneto
- Province: Province of Treviso (TV)

Area
  - Total: 8.79 km^{2} (3.39 sq mi)
- Elevation: 189 m (620 ft)

Population (October. 2023)
  - Total: 2,336
  - Density: 266/km^{2} (688/sq mi)
- Time zone: UTC+1 (CET)
  - Summer (DST): UTC+2 (CEST)
- Postal code: 31030
- Dialing code: 0423
- ISTAT code: 026011
- Patron saint: St. George
- Saint day: 23 April
- Website: Official website

Castelcucco is a comune (municipality) in the Province of Treviso in the Italian region Veneto, located about 60 kilometres (37 mi) northwest of Venice and about 35 kilometres (22 mi) northwest of Treviso. As of 31 May 2021, it had a population of 2,288 and an area of 8.8 square kilometres (3.4 mi^{2}).

Castelcucco borders the municipalities of Asolo, Cavaso del Tomba, Monfumo, Pieve del Grappa, and Possagno.

== Recent history ==
- The Nineteenth Century

After the fall of the Serenissima, it was the turn of Napoleon. During this period, the country had to suffer the violence and robberies of the French troops. In 1806 there was an amalgamation of municipalities: Castelcucco, Crespignaga, Monfumo and Pagnano lost their municipal autonomy becoming fractions of the municipality of Asolo. In 1810 the commune was reconstituted. In 1836 the town suffered another earthquake that saw the collapse of the old and unsafe bell tower.

- The Twentieth Century

The municipality of Castelcucco has undergone the following changes: in 1928 the municipality is suppressed and its territories aggregated to the municipality of Asolo; in 1946 the municipality was reconstituted (Census 1936: pop. res. 1581).

== Monuments and places of interest ==
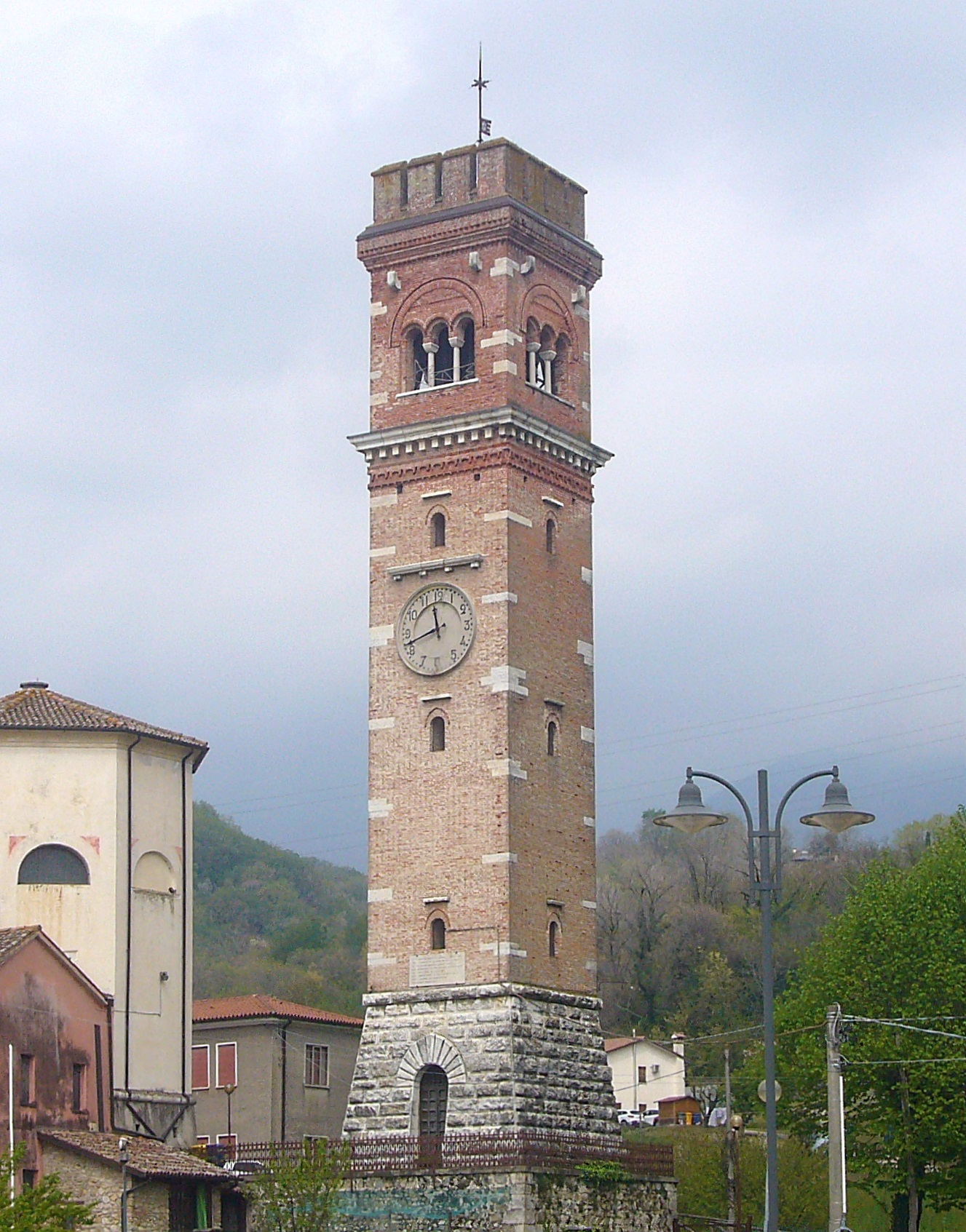
The bell tower of the archpriest's church

- Religious architecture

The bell tower of the archpriest church The archpriest church of San Giorgio is located at a lower point than the town square, contrary to the widespread custom that sees religious buildings placed at the highest points. From a distance, therefore, it is not very visible and only a part of the bell tower can be seen. Inside there are numerous frescoes; the main one is that of St. George, patron saint of the town, depicted in the act of slaying the dragon. Here there is also the fresco in which Saint Lucy gives her eyes to the Madonna. The Tamburini organ dates back to 1942.

Scattered around the town there are numerous capitals dedicated to Santa Lucia, San Bartolomeo (San Bortolo), San Francesco, Santa Margherita, San Gaetano and Santa Giustina.

== Demographic evolution ==
Historical population

Year	Pop.	±%
1861	?	—
1871	1,528	—
1881	1,588	+3.9%
1901	1,626	+2.4%
1911	1,812	+11.4%
1921	1,804	−0.4%

Year	Pop.	±%
1931	1,594	−11.6%
1936	1,581	−0.8%
1951	1,600	+1.2%
1961	1,350	−15.6%
1971	1,304	−3.4%
1981	1,648	+26.4%

Year	Pop.	±%
1991	1,693	+2.7%
2001	1,871	+10.5%
2011	2,174	+16.2%
2021	2,299	+5.7%

Source: Data from ISTAT

=== Foreign ethnicities and minorities ===
As of December 31, 2022, foreigners residents in the municipality were 189, i.e. 8.1% of the population. The largest groups are shown below:

1. Romania 55
2. Morocco 32
3. Senegal 29
4. North Macedonia 27
5. Albania 14

== Culture ==
- Events

Every year, on the second weekend of July, the "Beer Festival" is set up. It takes place in a Bavarian marquee near the Casel. In conjunction with the festival there are also some merry-go-rounds. Throughout the month of August, on the other hand, in Località San Bortolo there are three festivals for three consecutive weekends, first that of the Alpini, then that of AVIS and finally the Festa del Cacciatore, which in the last period has encountered some problems with animal rights activists.

== Instruction ==
There is a kindergarten, primary and secondary school, where pupils from neighbouring countries often converge.

== Twin towns ==
Castelcucco is twinned with:

- Rohr in Niederbayern, Germany, since 2004
