= Cornuda =

- Comune
- Comune di Cornuda
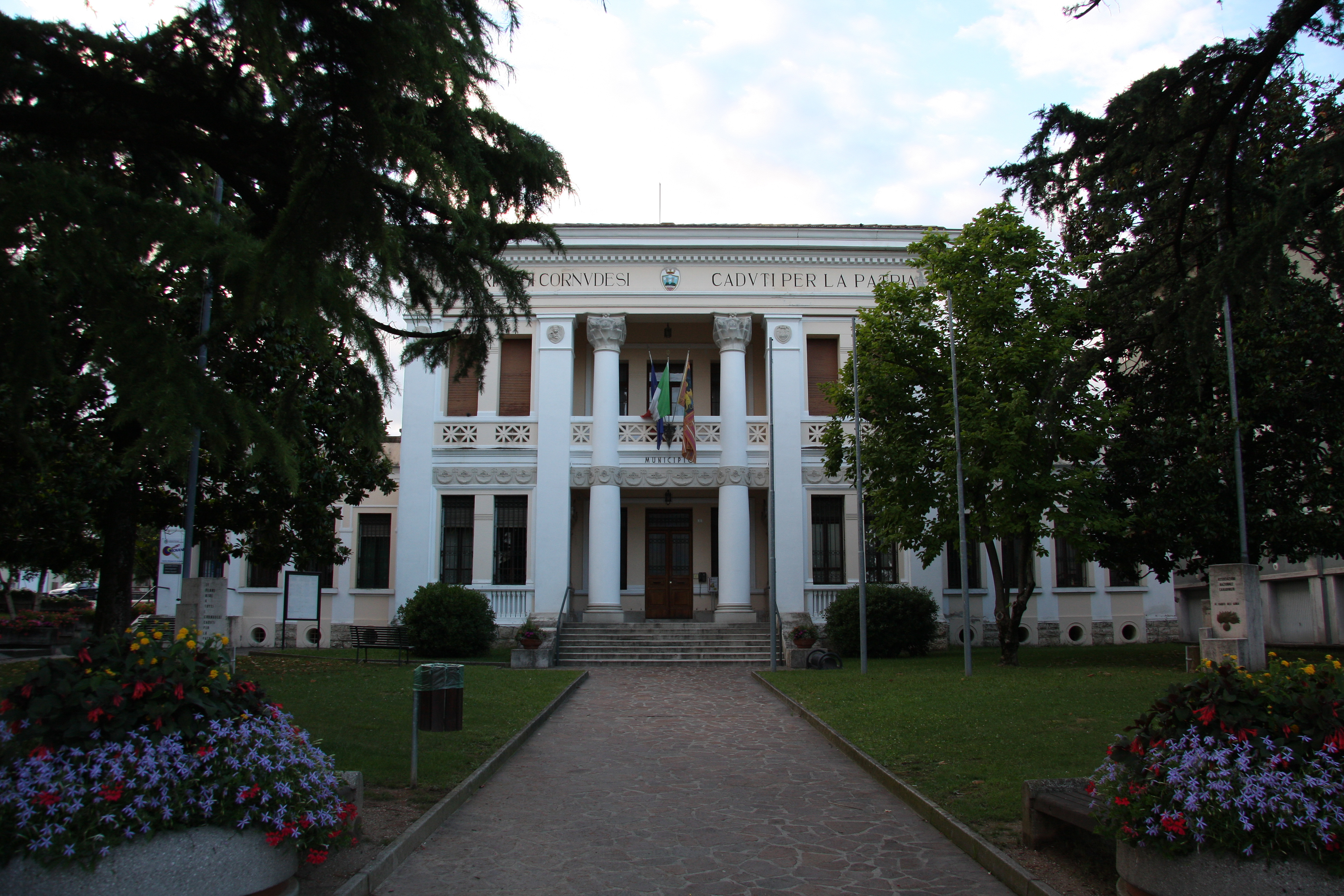
- Municipal headquarters of Cornuda

- Location within Italy Location within Veneto
- Coordinates: 45°50′N 12°0′E
- Country: Italy
- Region: Veneto
- Province: Treviso (TV)

Government
  - Mayor: Enrico Gallina (lista civica di centro-destra Fare per Cornuda)

Area
  - Total: 12 km^{2} (4.6 sq mi)
- Elevation: 163 m (535 ft)

Population (31 December 2022)
  - Total: 6,276
  - Density: 520/km^{2} (1,400/sq mi)
- Demonym: Cornudi
- Time zone: UTC+1 (CET)
  - Summer (DST): UTC+2 (CEST)
- Postal code: 31041
- Dialing code: 0423
- ISTAT code: 026023
- Patron saint: San Martino
- Saint day: 11 November
- Website: Official website

Cornuda is a comune with 6,276 inhabitants in the province of Treviso.

== Physical geography ==
The territory of Cornuda, which extends to the right of the Piave, is largely hilly. The inhabited area insists on a roughly flat area, whose altitudes vary from a minimum of 135 m a.s.l., found at the southern end, to no more than 165 m.

Cornuda borders the following municipalities: Caerano di San Marco, Crocetta del Montello, Maser, Monfumo, Montebelluna, Pederobba.

== History ==
The origins of the toponym are uncertain: a first hypothesis makes it derive from the Latin cornua ("horns"), alluding to the location of the locality, located at the eastern end of the centuriation of Asolo, municipium in Roman times. Another explanation links it to the two hills, similar to horns, at the foot of which the town was built. Still, there are those who consider it an alteration of a term meaning "crossroads", bringing it closer to the intersection between the via Feltrina and the Piovega, important arteries since ancient times.

Civilization appeared here already in prehistoric times, as evidenced by the large quantity of stone material that emerges almost everywhere and the finds found in the San Lorenzo valley. During the construction of the "Filanda Serena", in 1881, the remains of an alleged Paleoveneto and Roman settlement were also identified.

Cornuda developed during the barbarian invasions, welcoming refugees from nearby villages who were looking for a more protected position from attacks. Proof of its importance was the construction of a parish church, seat of one of the four archpriests into which the diocese of Treviso was divided from the end of the eighth century. From this period is a document that shows the name Cornuta for the first time: it recalls the debts contracted by the inhabitants with the monastery of Casier.

The construction of the fortress is also from this period, while the castle of Colle is later. The fortresses and fiefs of the bishop of Treviso were destroyed during the troubled Ezzelin period.

Only at the end of the fourteenth century began a greater stability due to the conquest of the Serenissima. As in the whole of the Veneto hinterland, the agricultural economy in Cornuda also depended on the Venetian patrician families. There are some villas from this period.

The fall of the Serenissima was followed by a turbulent period in which the French and Austrian administrations took turns. Definitely passed under the Lombard-Venetian Kingdom, in 1848 Cornuda was the setting for a battle of the Italian Risorgimento, with the victory of the Austrian army over the papal troops supported by numerous volunteers. However, the Habsburg period is also known for the construction of some works that brought economic prosperity; for example, the railway system was strengthened, making Cornuda a fundamental hub for the connections between the plain and the foothills.

== Monuments and places of interest ==
=== Civil architectures ===
- Palazzo De Faveri Tron

Near the center, it is a construction built between the end of the eighteenth century and the beginning of the nineteenth century. The complex consists of a compact main body, flanked by a two-storey volume, followed by an adjacency with a portico and a turret. The whole is inserted in a vast park of secular trees. The main body is a three-storey building with a symmetrical and tripartite facade. The entrance door on the ground floor corresponds to an opening with a balcony on the second and a simple window on the third. The central openings are also flanked by two windows on each side. The result of a recent restoration are the two copper caps that cover the entrance door and the window above and the frescoed sundial.

- Italian Tipoteca

The Museum of Printing and Typographic Design, world-class for the richness of its collections and exhibition environment, having received the honorable mention at the 25th Compasso d'Oro ADI Award in June 2018, is located in via Canapificio 3 in the former church of Santa Teresa and in the adjacent guesthouse. The buildings were part of the Canapificio Veneto, an industrial complex inaugurated in 1883, the very first example of a "horizontal" factory designed for electricity and a monument to the Second Industrial Revolution. The contiguous "Tipoteca Auditorium" is a building of high architectural value, intended as a cultural space and designed to host conferences, presentations and shows.

== Demographic evolution ==
Historical population

Year	Pop.	±%
1861	?	—
1871	1,496	—
1881	1,620	+8.3%
1901	2,333	+44.0%
1911	3,005	+28.8%
1921	3,184	+6.0%

Year	Pop.	±%
1931	3,020	−5.2%
1936	2,971	−1.6%
1951	3,642	+22.6%
1961	4,407	+21.0%
1971	5,043	+14.4%
1981	5,041	−0.0%

Year	Pop.	±%
1991	5,313	+5.4%
2001	5,740	+8.0%
2011	6,211	+8.2%
2021	6,286	+1.2%

Source: Data from ISTAT

=== Foreign ethnicities and minorities ===
As of December 31, 2023, foreigners residents in the municipality were 1,033, i.e. 16.7% of the population. The largest groups are shown below:

1. China 420
2. Romania 177
3. Morocco 141
4. Albania 97
5. North Macedonia 33

== Economy ==
The main source of income for the population remains agriculture, where cereals, wheat, vegetables and vines are grown. Breeding is also practiced, especially of cattle and sheep. The job is offered by industrial companies that span different sectors. Commercial enterprises meet the needs of the community, while the services include municipal, post offices, Pro Loco, banking and IT consultancy offices.

== Infrastructure and transport ==
Cornuda is crossed by the SP84 and the SS348 "Feltrina" which cross in the center of the town. Subsequently, with the development of the "new Feltrina", it was decided to divert the road to the suburbs, in order to relieve traffic and make the city center safer.

The city is served by the MOM bus lines that connect it with Conegliano, Pieve di Soligo, Montebelluna, Valdobbiadene and Asolo.

The Cornuda station, located on the Calalzo-Padua line, is served by regional trains operated by Trenitalia as part of the service contract stipulated with the Veneto Region. The reopening of the railway section that connects Treviso and Feltre and the end of the electrification and infrastructure consolidation works is scheduled for the end of October 2024.

== Twin towns ==
Cornuda is twinned with:

- Natschbach-Loipersbach, Austria
