= Jacutinga, Rio Grande do Sul =

Municipality in Rio Grande do Sul, Brazil

Coordinates: 27°43′44″S 52°32′06″W

- Municipality
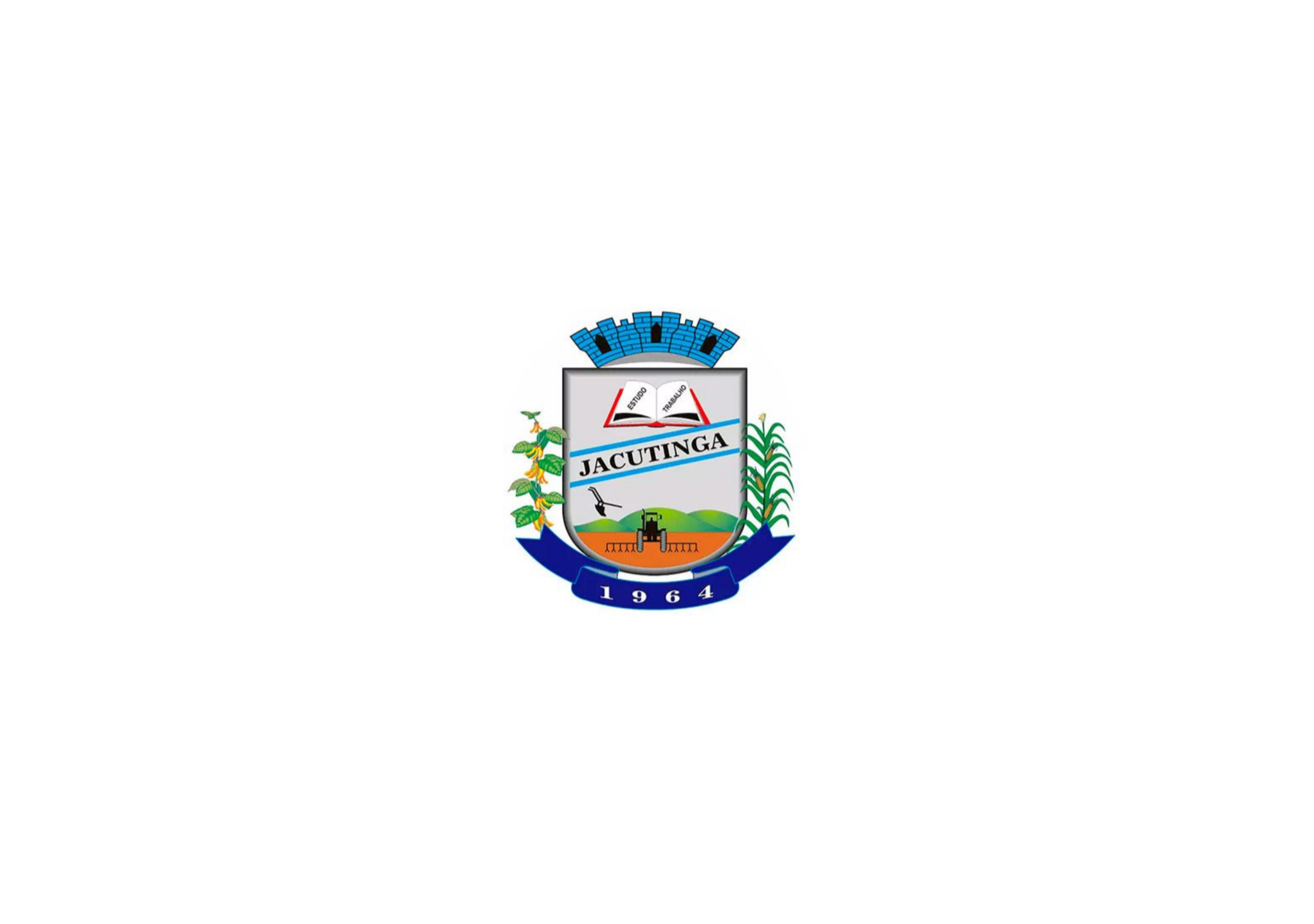
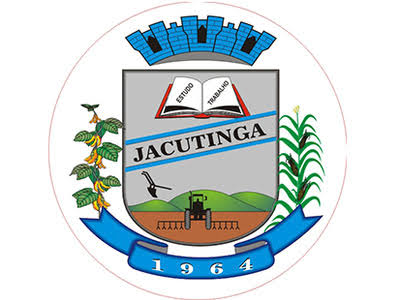
- Flag Coat of arms
- Interactive map of Jacutinga, Rio Grande do Sul
- Country: Brazil
- Time zone: UTC−3 (BRT)

Map showing location of Jacutinga in red.

Jacutinga is a municipality in the state of Rio Grande do Sul, Brazil. As of 2020, the estimated population was 3,546.

== See also ==
- List of municipalities in Rio Grande do Sul
