= Vidor =

- Comune
- Comune di Vidor
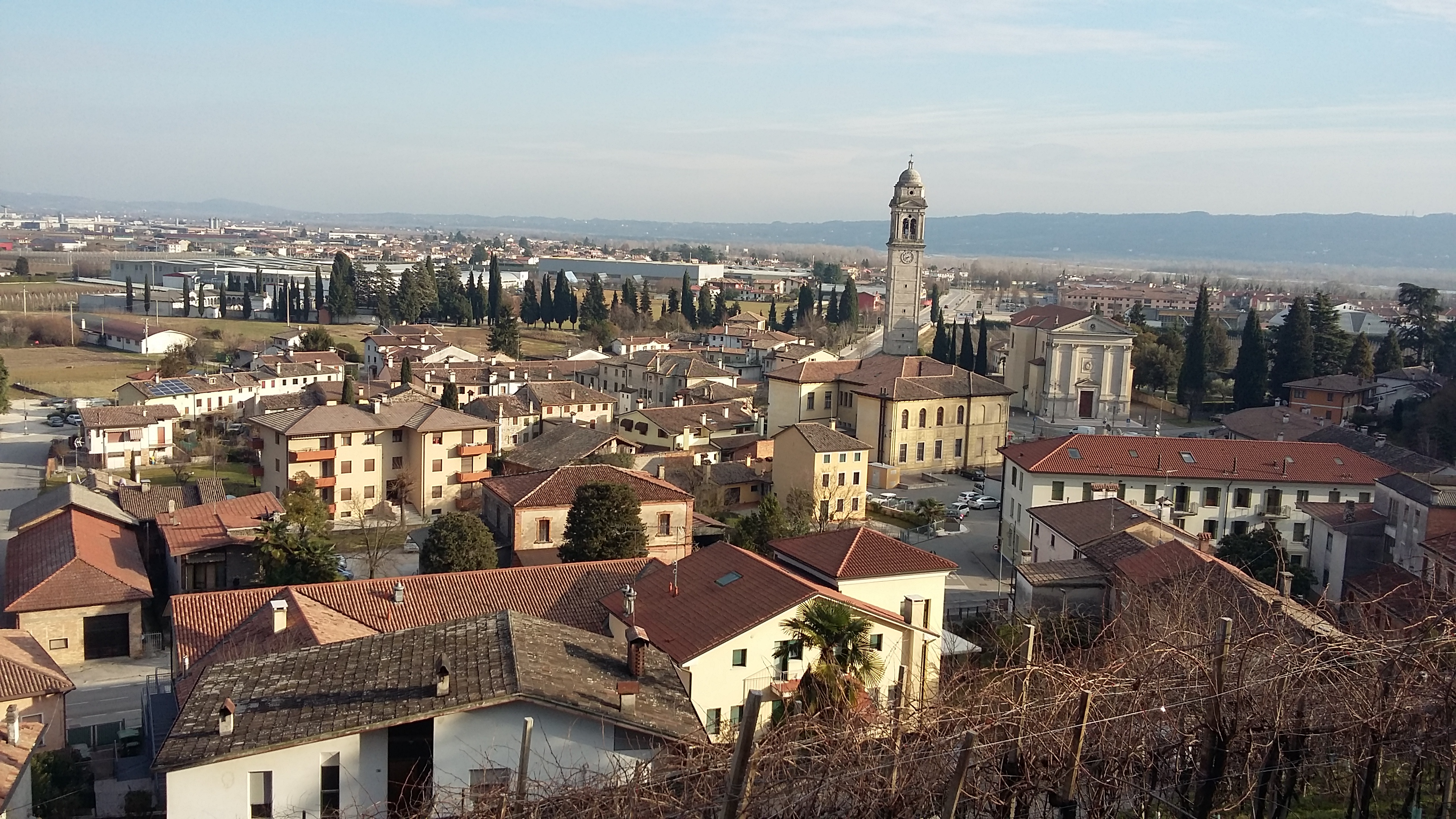
- Panorama of Vidor from the Castle Hill

- Coat of arms

- Location within Italy Location within Veneto
- Coordinates: 45°52′N 12°2′E
- Country: Italy
- Region: Veneto
- Province: Treviso (TV)
- Frazioni: Bosco, Colbertaldo

Government
  - Mayor: Mario Bailo (Lega Salvini)

Area
  - Total: 13.52 km^{2} (5.22 sq mi)
- Elevation: 152 m (499 ft)

Population (30 November 2025)
  - Total: 3,563
  - Density: 263.5/km^{2} (682.6/sq mi)
- Demonym: Vidoresi
- Time zone: UTC+1 (CET)
  - Summer (DST): UTC+2 (CEST)
- Postal code: 31020
- Dialing code: 0423
- Patron saint: St. Joseph
- Saint day: 19 March
- Website: Official website

Vidor is a town and comune (municipality) in the province of Treviso, Veneto, north-eastern Italy. It is located 7 km from Valdobbiadene, 35 km from Treviso and about 70 km from Venice. It borders the following municipalities: Valdobbiadene, Farra di Soligo, Moriago della Battaglia, Pederobba and Crocetta del Montello to the south. The municipality is part of the Quartier del Piave. The hilly part of the municipal area is part of the UNESCO World Heritage Site "Prosecco Hills of Conegliano and Valdobbiadene".

== Physical geography ==
The municipal territory of Vidor is located in the northern part of the Province of Treviso, and develops partly in the plain and partly in a hilly area with various reliefs that border the Quartier del Piave to the west and north (col Polenta, 211 m; col Castellon, 235 m; col Maor, 368 m). The main waterway that crosses the municipality is the Piave river, a river sacred to the homeland, on which there is one of the historic bridges that connect the right and left banks of the river, the Vidor Bridge. There are also two other streams, worthy of note, that flow in the municipal area: the Teva stream and, in the hamlet of Colbertaldo, the Rosper stream, which contributes to the formation of the characteristic palù, wetlands typical of the Treviso Left Piave.

Among the various climatic zones of the Veneto region, Vidor is located in the hilly area and part of the flat one, where the climate is milder.

== History ==
In 1986 a small necropolis was found under Piazza Maggiore, dating back to the fourth century. The area was therefore frequented in Roman times, also given the passage of the Via Claudia Augusta Altinate. In the eastern part of the municipality, moreover, the regularity of the agrarian arrangement would prove the ancient centuriation of the territory. In the Middle Ages, the strategic importance of Vidor as a road junction and river port on the Piave (exploited until 1871), led to the construction of the castle, which has now disappeared, and the abbey, which contributed to the reclamation of the area. In the thirteenth century, the Pio Ospedale di Santa Maria dei Battuti was founded, managed by the confraternity of the same name, with the aim of welcoming the numerous wayfarers who passed through the town.

Vidor was hit hard by the First World War: being right at the Piave front, it was occupied by the Central Powers until the end of the conflict. During the fierce fighting, the artistic heritage of the village, such as the church and the abbey, was damaged. Moreover, thanks to its strategic importance, during the First World War it was chosen to make a "bridgehead "to allow the troops retreating from the defeat of Caporetto to cross the Piave.

== Monuments and places of interest ==
- Archpriest Church

The archpriest's church, the work of Giovanni Rossi, is dedicated to the Holy Name of Mary and probably dates back to before 1000, when the castle was built, and served both the small local population and the feudal lords. Formerly a chapel dependent on the parish church of Col San Martino, it became a parish towards the end of the 15th century. Between 1729 and 1748 it was rebuilt at the foot of the slopes of the castle hill, where the old church was located, now in ruins and isolated; the bell tower was built between 1857 and 1885. It suffered serious damage during the First World War, the only building of the entire complex that remained almost intact was the bell tower, probably useful to enemy forces as a point of reference. The bell tower contains a mighty concert of three bells plus a recall ring.

- Abbey of Santa Bona

Between 1107 and 1110 a certain Giovanni Gravone da Vidor founded a Benedictine abbey to house the relics of a Saint Bona which he had brought from the Holy Land during the first crusade.It represented a powerful institution, but ended up rapidly declining: in the 15th century it was definitively given in commendation to the Cornaro family and in 1773 the Serenissima decreed its suppression. Almost completely destroyed during the Great War. It was restored in the 1920s and currently shows heavy signs of renovation.

- Castle area

At the site where the Vidor castle stood (destroyed in 1510), there is an ossuary monument commemorating the soldiers who fell during the world wars. The entire monument is dominated by a small temple dedicated to the Blessed Virgin of Sorrows, designed by the Venetian architect Brenno Del Giudice. This place can be reached via a path bordered by a via crucis. The locality, still called Castello today, hosts the Palio di Vidor every year, an event that recalls the numerous attacks that the fortress suffered in medieval times and beyond.

- Villa Vergerio

The complex is made up of some buildings, including the actual villa (rebuilt after the Great War) and the vast surrounding areas. Nearby stands the oratory of San Giuseppe, patron saint of the municipality, to which travelers who had to cross the Piave took their vows.

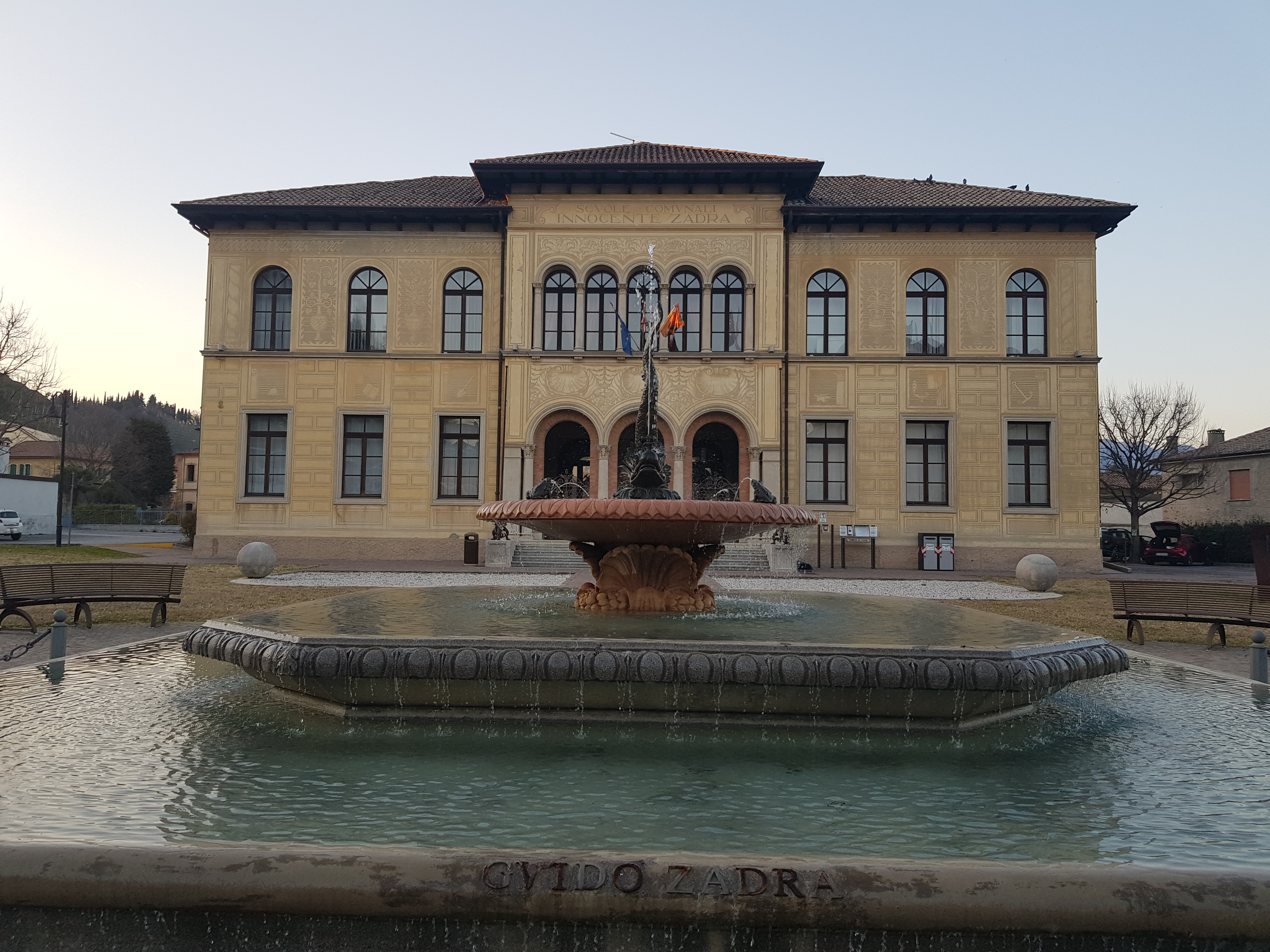
Vidor municipal headquarters

- Municipal building

Since 2010, the municipal headquarters has been located in the building of the former Innocente Zadra schools. It is a prestigious building constructed at the behest of the Zadra family in 1930 and inaugurated the following year. The external facades of the building are decorated with frescoes depicting symbols related to education and work. The entrance to the palace consists of three arches, with Corinthian style columns, equipped with wrought iron gates. Once past the entrance arches there is a frescoed atrium.

== Demographic evolution ==
Historical population

Year	Pop.	±%
1861	?	—
1871	1,793	—
1881	1,775	−1.0%
1901	1,957	+10.3%
1911	2,330	+19.1%
1921	2,487	+6.7%

Year	Pop.	±%
1931	2,736	+10.0%
1936	2,665	−2.6%
1951	2,688	+0.9%
1961	2,590	−3.6%
1971	2,742	+5.9%
1981	2,954	+7.7%

Year	Pop.	±%
1991	2,961	+0.2%
2001	3,405	+15.0%
2011	3,769	+10.7%
2021	3,662	−2.8%

Source: Data from ISTAT

=== Foreign ethnicities and minorities ===
As of January 1, 2025 foreigners residents in the municipality were 364, i.e. 10.1% of the population. The largest groups are shown below:

1. North Macedonia 93
2. Romania 62
3. Morocco 61
4. China 33
5. Ukraine 22

== Economy ==
The area of Vidor, included in the Quartier del Piave, is known for its wine production, especially for the cultivation of Prosecco of Valdobbiadene. Still of some importance is the cultivation of corn and potatoes. Numerous small and medium-sized enterprises have given rise to the formation of industrial and craft areas, with the production of furniture being the most important. It was the headquarters of the Cassa Rurale ed Artigiana di Vidor which, after various vicissitudes, merged into the Banca della Marca. During the last century, the industrial production of the village was practically the monopoly of the Zadra silk factory. This Filanda-Setificio will operate until 1964 when it will have to close because of competition from China and other countries. Now renovated and become a sausage factory.

== Infrastructure and transport ==
Located in the immediate vicinity of the bridge over the Piave built by the company Odorico & C and inaugurated on 11 June 1870 to replace a previous ancient building that stood a little further downstream, the town of Vidor between 1913 and 1931 was located from the Covolo-Vidor station and the Vidor stop, located respectively south and north of the bridge itself, along the Montebelluna-Valdobbiadene Tramway, which at the time represented an important development tool for the economy of the area.

Today, public mobility is managed by the company Mobilità di Marca S.p.A. (MOM), in particular the lines to Valdobbiadene, Montebelluna, Pieve di Soligo and Conegliano pass through Vidor. In addition the municipal area is served by the tourist red line, "Prosecco Hills Link" which crosses the entire area of the Prosecco Hills of Conegliano and Valdobbiadene, connecting Conegliano, Vidor to Valdobbiadene.

== Twin towns ==
Vidor is twinned with:

- Petritoli, Italy

== Gallery ==
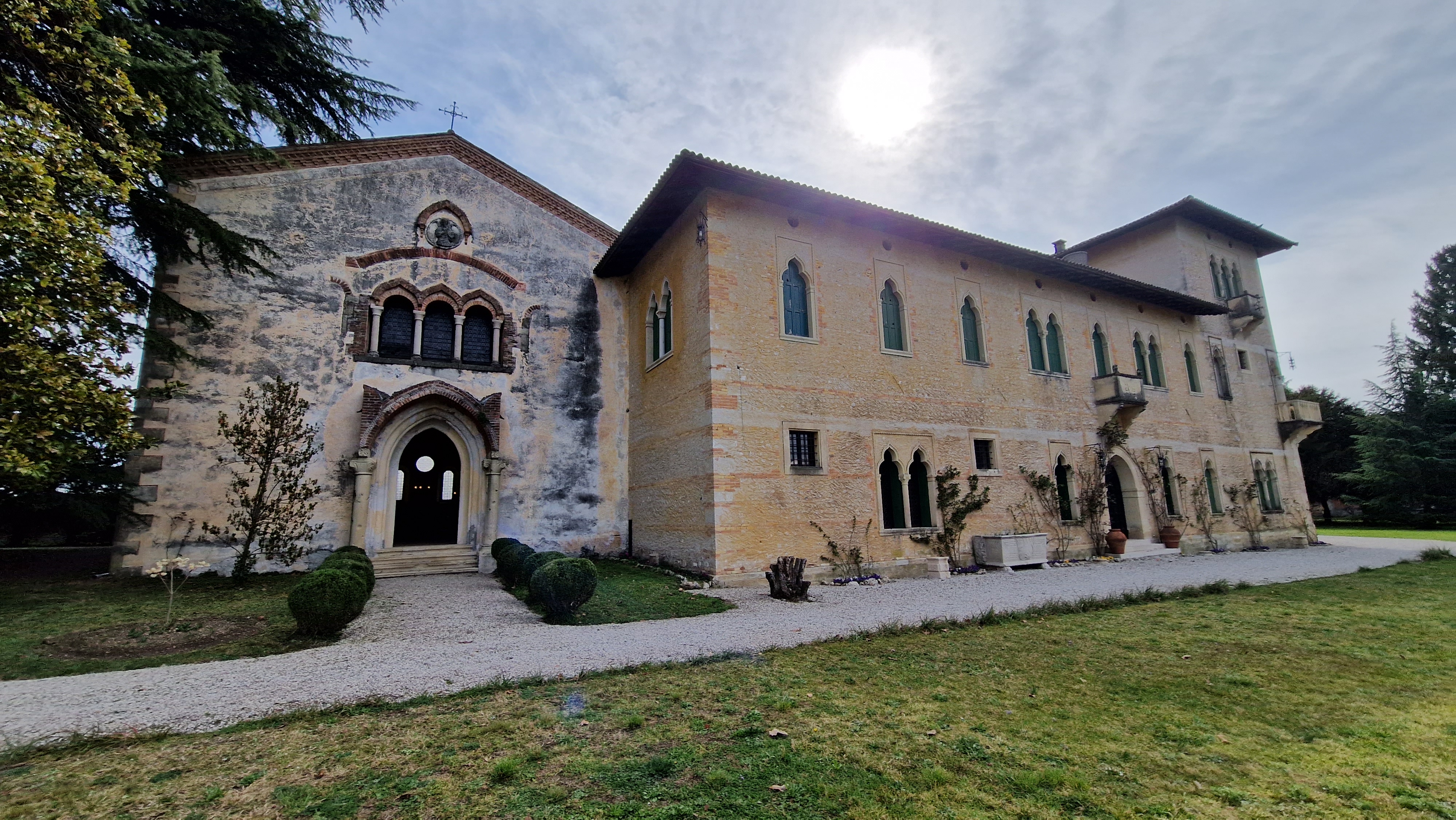
View of the Abbey of Santa Bona

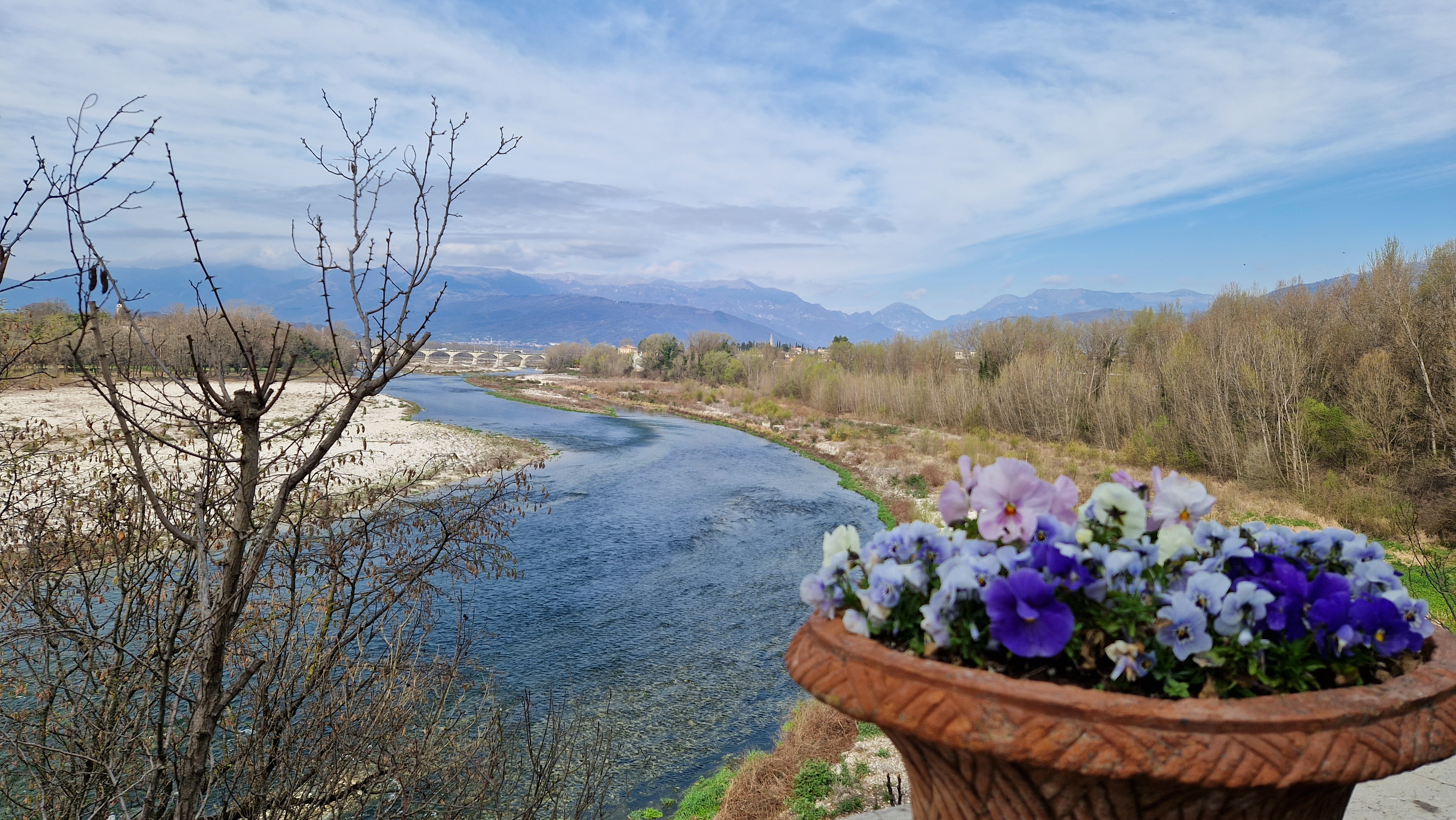
View from the Abbey towards the Bridge over the Piave

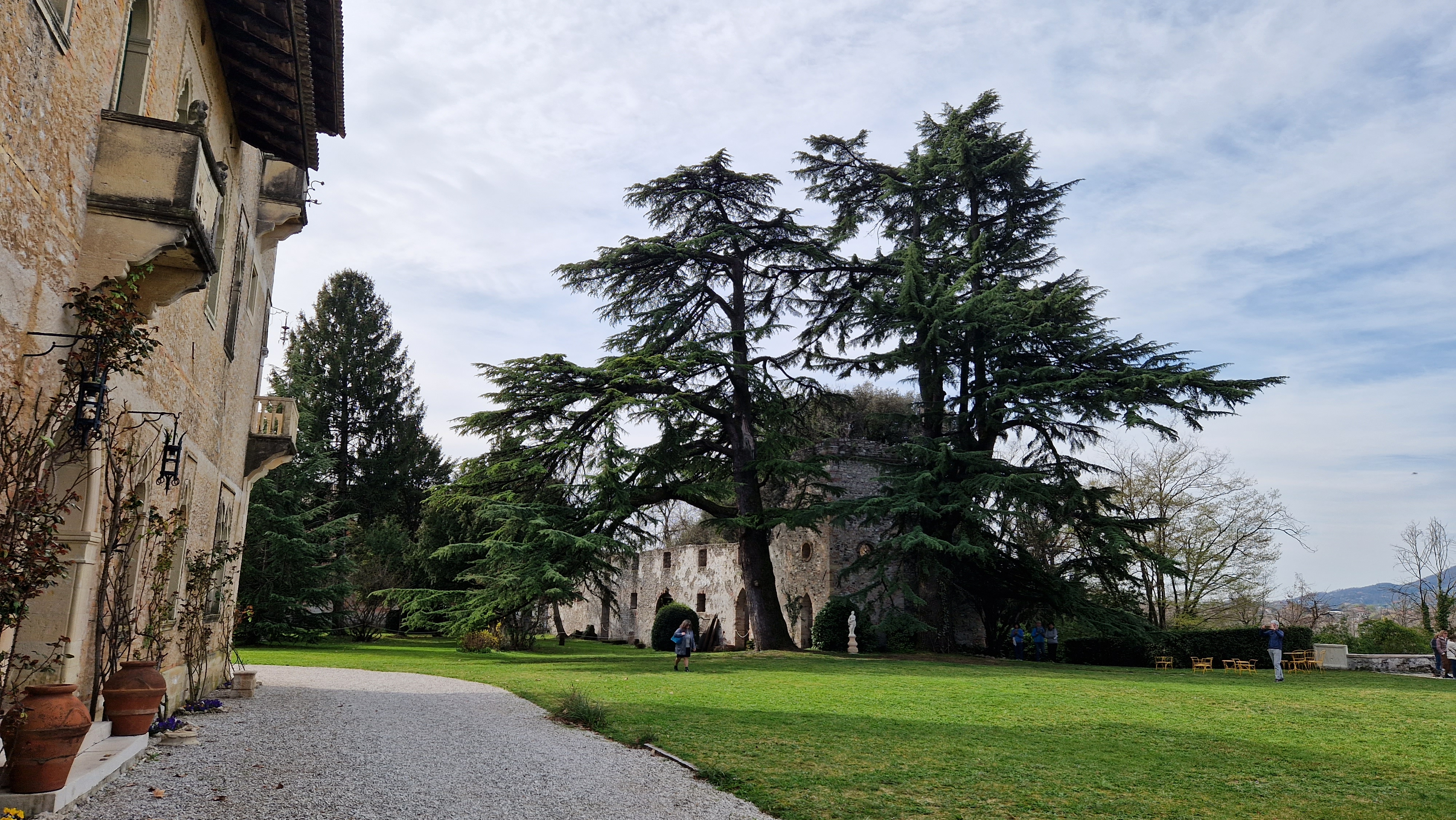
The park of the Abbey of Santa Bona

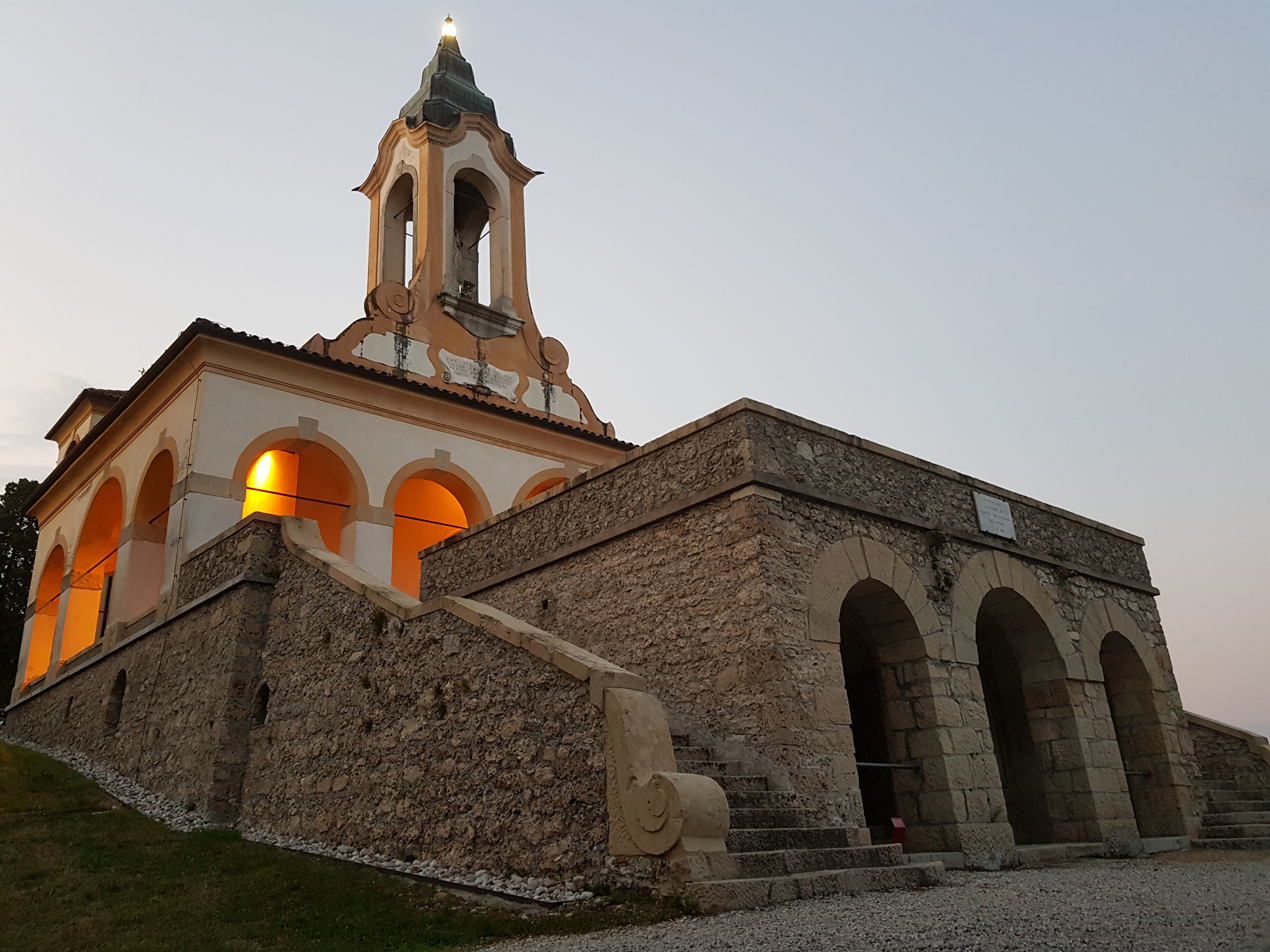
The Vidor Castle (Ossuary Temple of Our Lady of Sorrows)

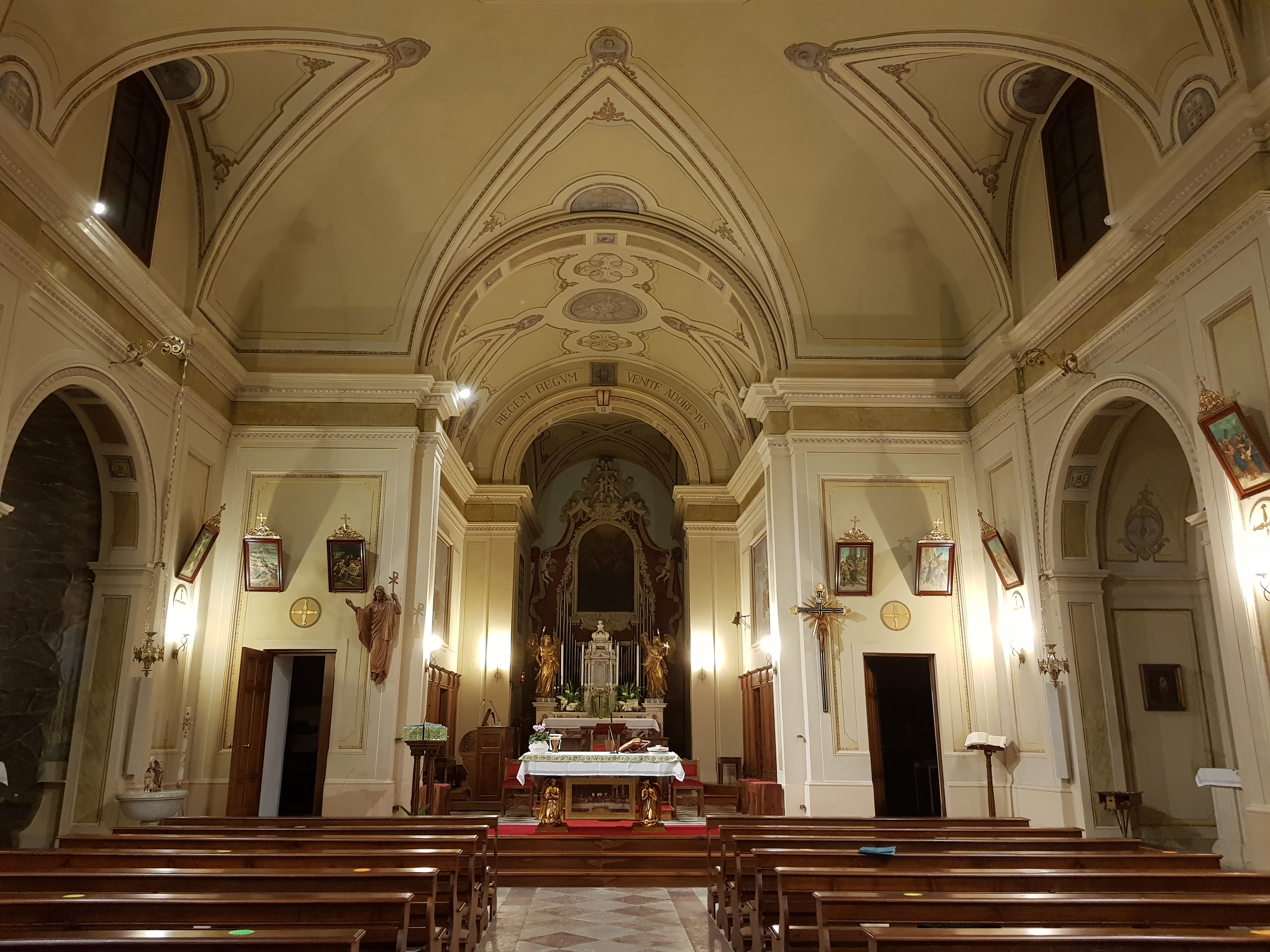
Interior of the Parish Church of Colbertaldo

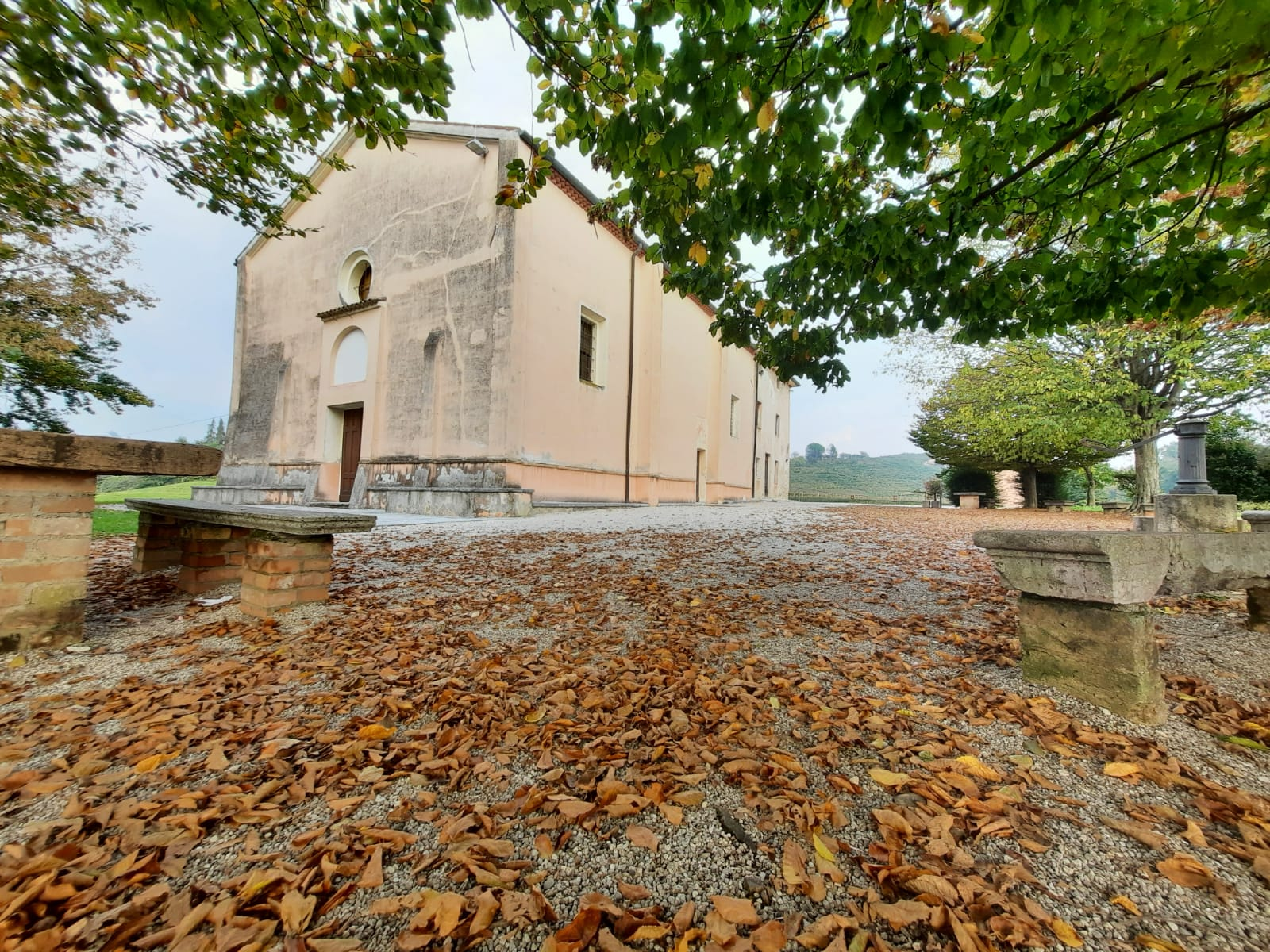
Sanctuary of Santa Maria delle Grazie in Colbertaldo

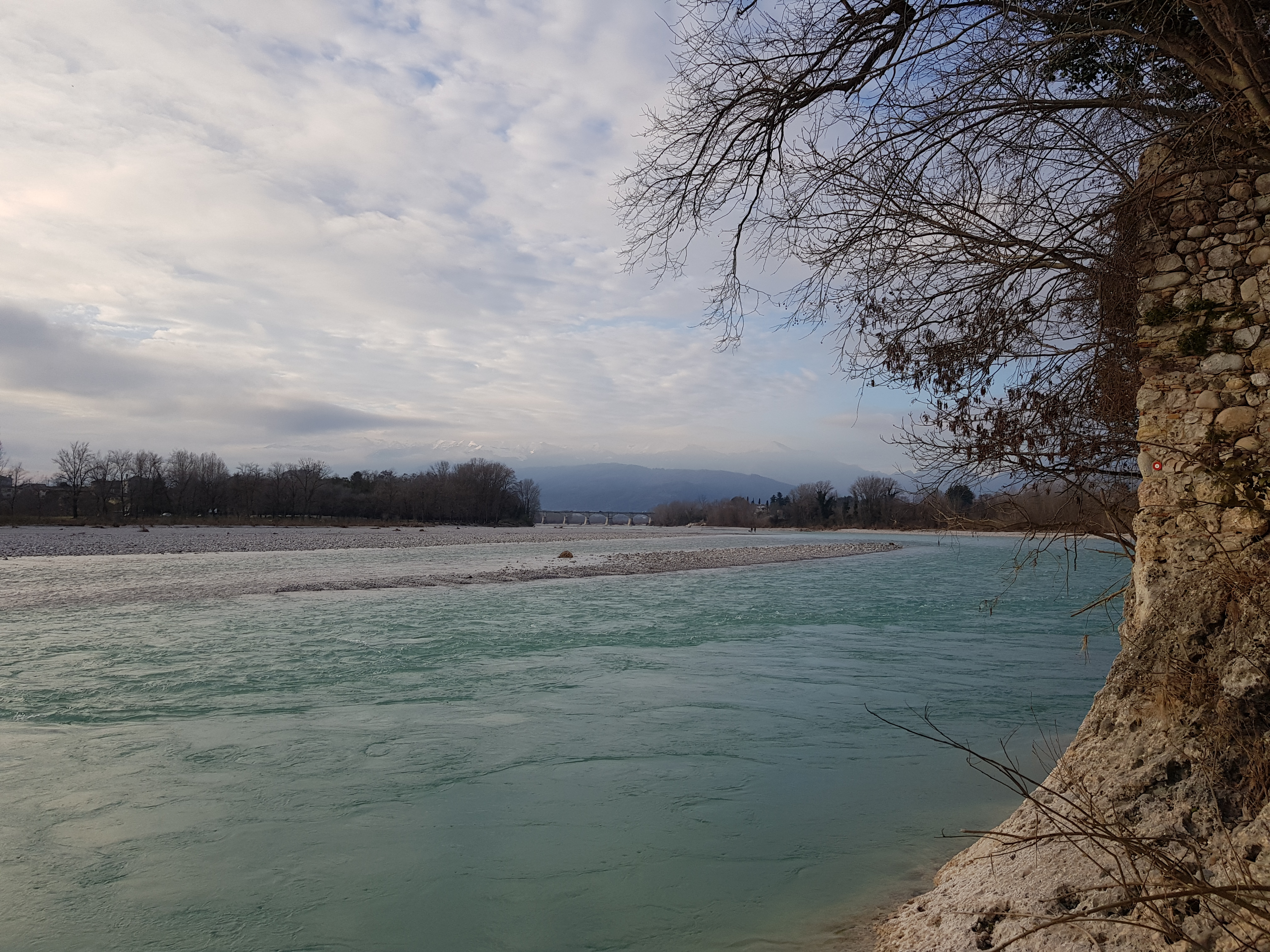
The Piave in the locality of "Sghirlo"

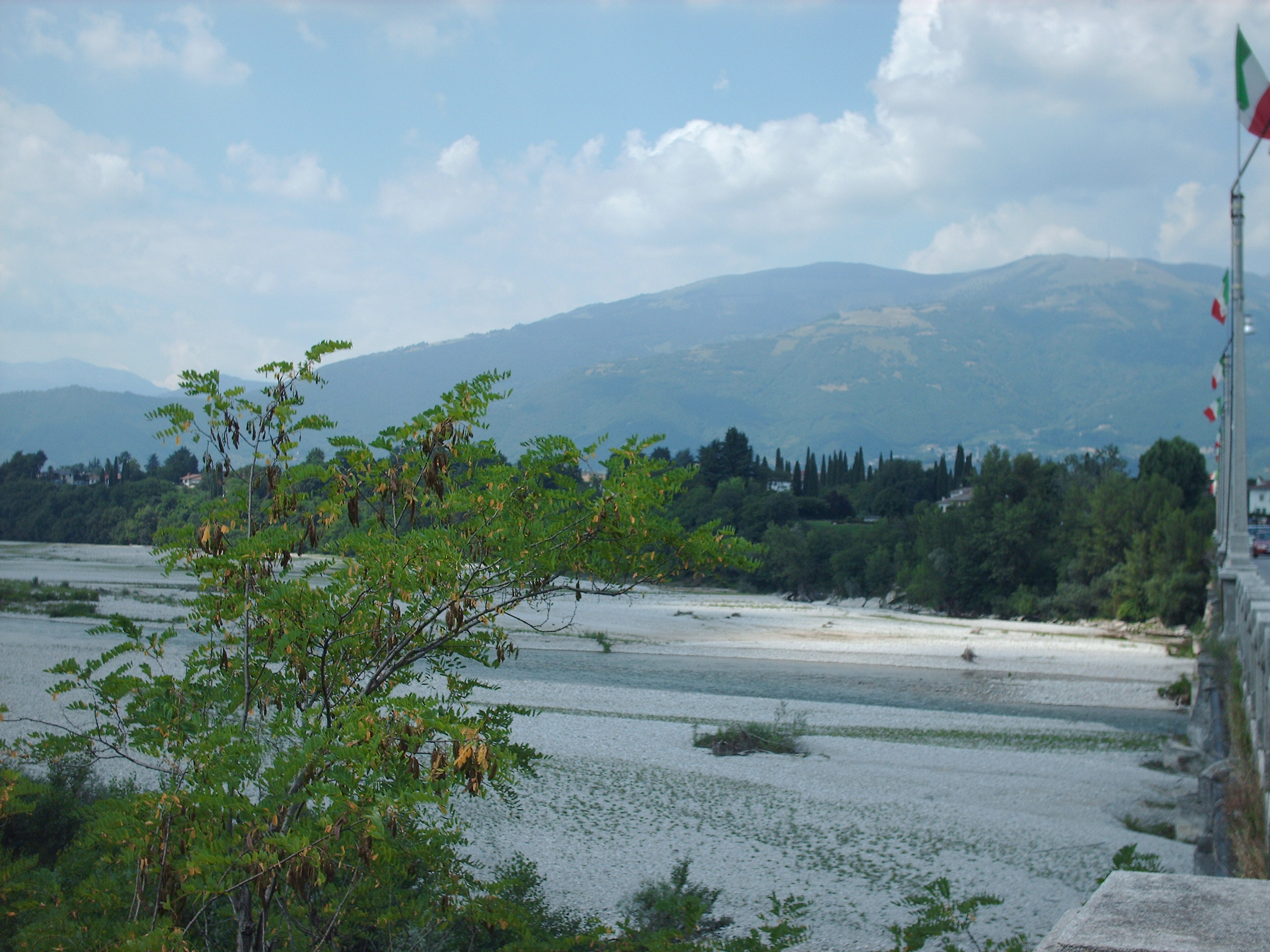
View of the Piave river from the Vidor bridge
