= Cavaso del Tomba =

- Comune
- Comune di Cavaso del Tomba
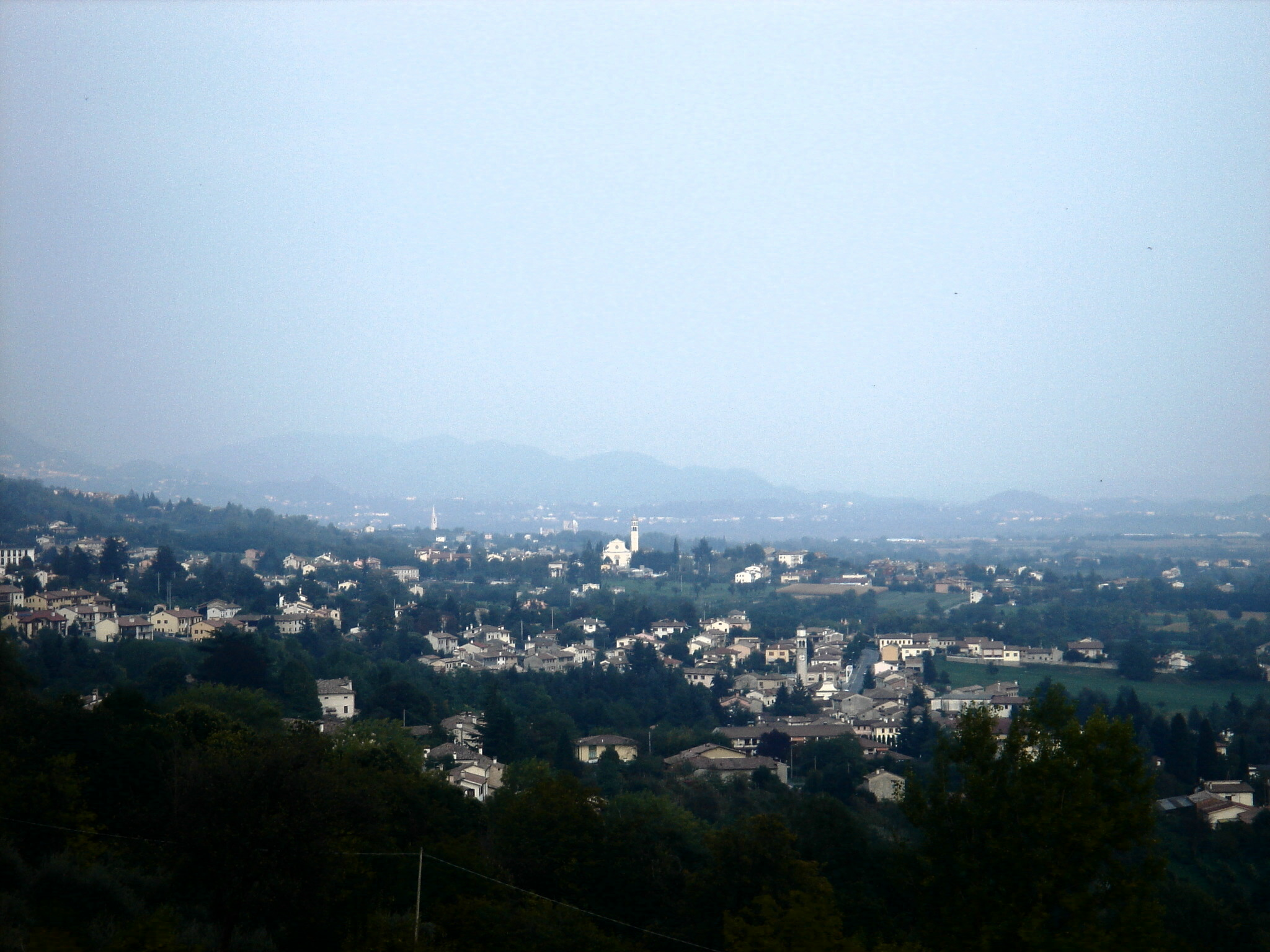

- Location within Italy Location within Veneto
- Coordinates: 45°52′N 11°54′E
- Country: Italy
- Region: Veneto
- Province: Treviso (TV)
- Frazioni: Colmelli: Caniezza (sede comunale), Castelcies, Virago, Costalunga, Granigo, Obledo, Vettorazzi, Capovilla e Pieve

Government
  - Mayor: Gino Rugolo

Area
  - Total: 18.96 km^{2} (7.32 sq mi)
- Elevation: 248 m (814 ft)

Population (30 June 2017)
  - Total: 2,904
  - Density: 153.2/km^{2} (396.7/sq mi)
- Demonym: Cavasotti or Cavasiensi
- Time zone: UTC+1 (CET)
  - Summer (DST): UTC+2 (CEST)
- Postal code: 31034
- Dialing code: 0423
- Patron saint: Madonna della Salute
- Saint day: 21 November
- Website: Official website

Cavaso del Tomba is a comune with about 3000 inhabitants in the province of Treviso, Veneto, north-eastern Italy. The municipality of Cavaso is spread over the southern flank of the buttress that extends from Monte Grappa towards the Piave River. It includes various villages, along its main road: Obledo, Caniezza, Paveion, Pieve, Vettorazzi, Granigo and Virago.

== History ==
Cavaso has been occupied for over 10,000 years. It now holds one of the oldest documents in Treviso, an engraved in stone that dates back to the 2nd century BC, in the church of S. Martino in Castelcies. The rock has a Latin inscription. During the Middle Ages Cavaso was occupied by various counts, and a number of castles in the area were built. Walperto I is one of the best known of the counts of Cavaso. The Da Romano family became powerful in the AD 15th century, with figures such as the brothers Alberico and Ezzelino IV. Cavaso was a center of trade of many years, and its central market is still listed as a traditional market place. It was, and is well known for its handicrafts. The 1695 earthquake caused a lot of damage, destroying the market place. During World War I a large battle was fought at Mount Tomba. A church commemorates the soldiers who died during that war. Cavaso remains a tourist destination, best known for its beautiful environment and numerous churches.
