= Venus Victrix (Canova) =

Neo-Classical portrait sculpture of Pauline Bonaparte by Antonio Canova

Pauline Bonaparte as Venus Victrix
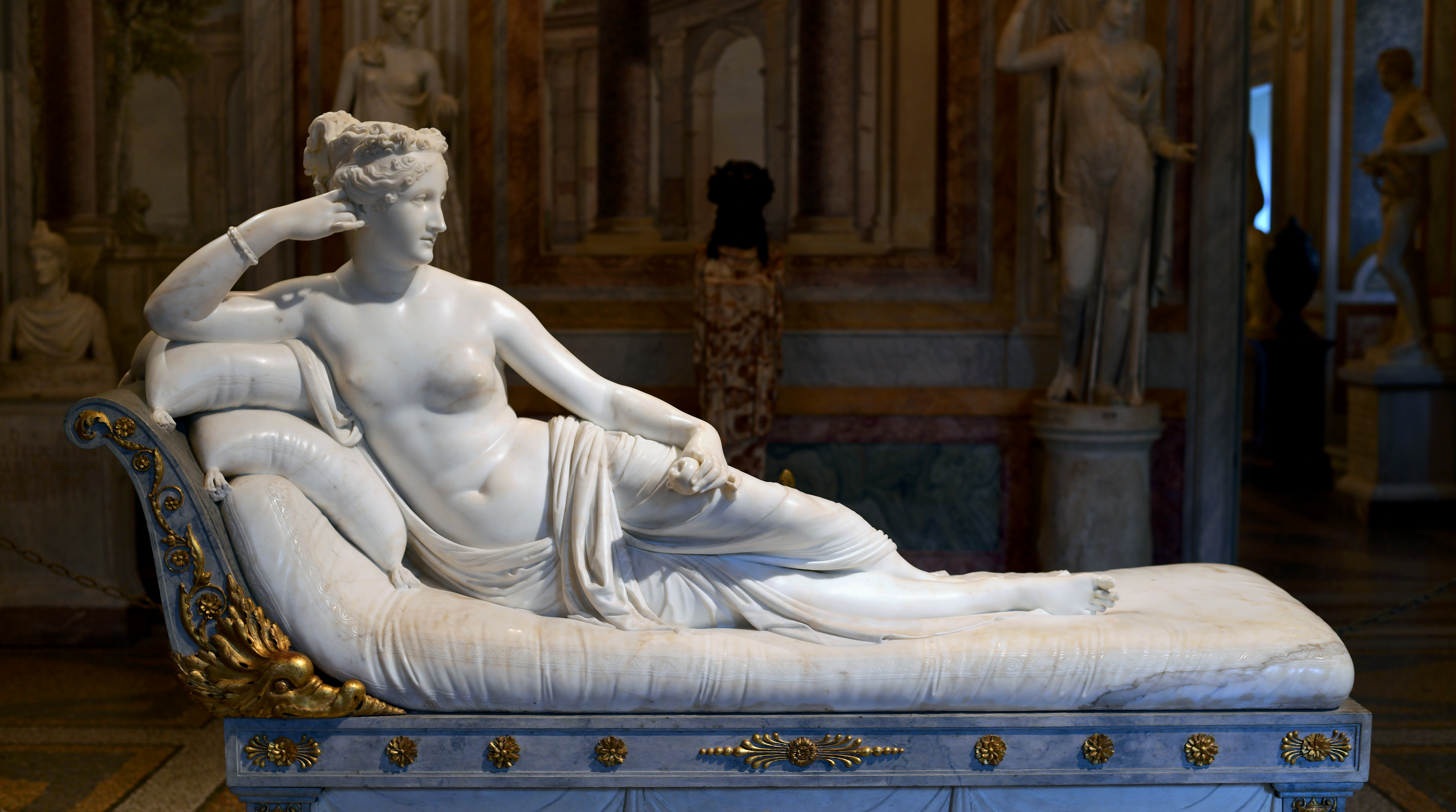
- Artist: Antonio Canova
- Year: 1805–1808
- Type: White Marble
- Location: Galleria Borghese, Rome

Pauline Bonaparte as Venus Victrix ("Venus Victorious") is a semi-nude and life-size reclining, neo-Classical portrait sculpture of Pauline Bonaparte by the Italian sculptor Antonio Canova, who revived ancient Roman artistic traditions of portraying mortal individuals in the guise of deities, a beautiful woman reclining on a couch, or reclining hermaphroditi. The sculpture was commissioned by her husband Camillo Borghese and executed in Rome from 1805 to 1808, after the subject's marriage into the Borghese family. It then was moved to Camillo's house in Turin, then to Genoa, only arriving in its present location at the Galleria Borghese in Rome around 1838.

== The sculpture ==
Although Canova did produce another of the Bonaparte family with his 1806 nude Napoleon as Mars the Peacemaker, at the time, nude portraits were unusual. Subjects of high rank usually were portrayed with strategically placed drapery. It is a matter of debate as to whether Pauline Bonaparte posed naked for the sculpture, since only the head is a relatively realistic portrait, whilst the torso is a neo-classically idealised form. When asked how she could pose for the sculptor wearing so little, she reputedly replied that there was a stove in the studio that kept her warm. This may have been apocryphal or a quip deliberately designed by her to stir up scandal.

She is portrayed holding an apple in her hand, evoking Aphrodite's victory in the Judgement of Paris as related in Classical Greek mythology. The room in which the sculpture is exhibited at the Galleria Borghese also has a ceiling painting portraying that judgement, painted by Domenico de Angelis in 1779 and inspired by a famous relief on the façade of the Villa Medici.

Canova was first instructed to depict Pauline Bonaparte fully clothed as the chaste goddess Diana, hunter and virgin, but reportedly Pauline laughed and said that nobody would believe she was a virgin. She had an international reputation for promiscuity in France and in Italy, and may have enjoyed the provocation of posing naked in Catholic Rome. Further, when Pauline was asked whether she really posed naked in front of Canova, she replied that in fact she was naked, that it did not constitute a problem because Canova "was not a real man", and that the room was too warm to pose dressed. Portrayal as the deity may have been influenced by Borghese family claims of mythical ancestry: they traced their descent to Venus, through her son Aeneas, the founder of Rome.

The wooden base, draped like a catafalque, once contained a mechanism for rotating the sculpture, similarly to other works by Canova and the adapted bases of ancient sculpture in galleries that enable a viewer to observe a sculpture from all angles without having to walk around it. In the era of its production, viewers could admire this sculpture by candlelight. The sculpture's lustre is not only due to the fine quality of the marble, but also to a waxed surface, which recently has been restored.

== The plaster original ==
The Museo Canova has the plaster cast of Venus Victrix, originally used as a model for the marble, in its gypsotheque, the plaster cast gallery for the museum. During the first Battle of Monte Grappa in 1917, a Christmas-time bombing severed the head of the plaster and damaged parts of the hands, feet, and cloth. A 2004 restoration repaired that damage. In 2020, a tourist broke some of the toes as he sat on the plaster cast while posing for a selfie.

== See also ==
- Venus Victrix
