= Tempio Canoviano =

Roman Catholic church in Italy

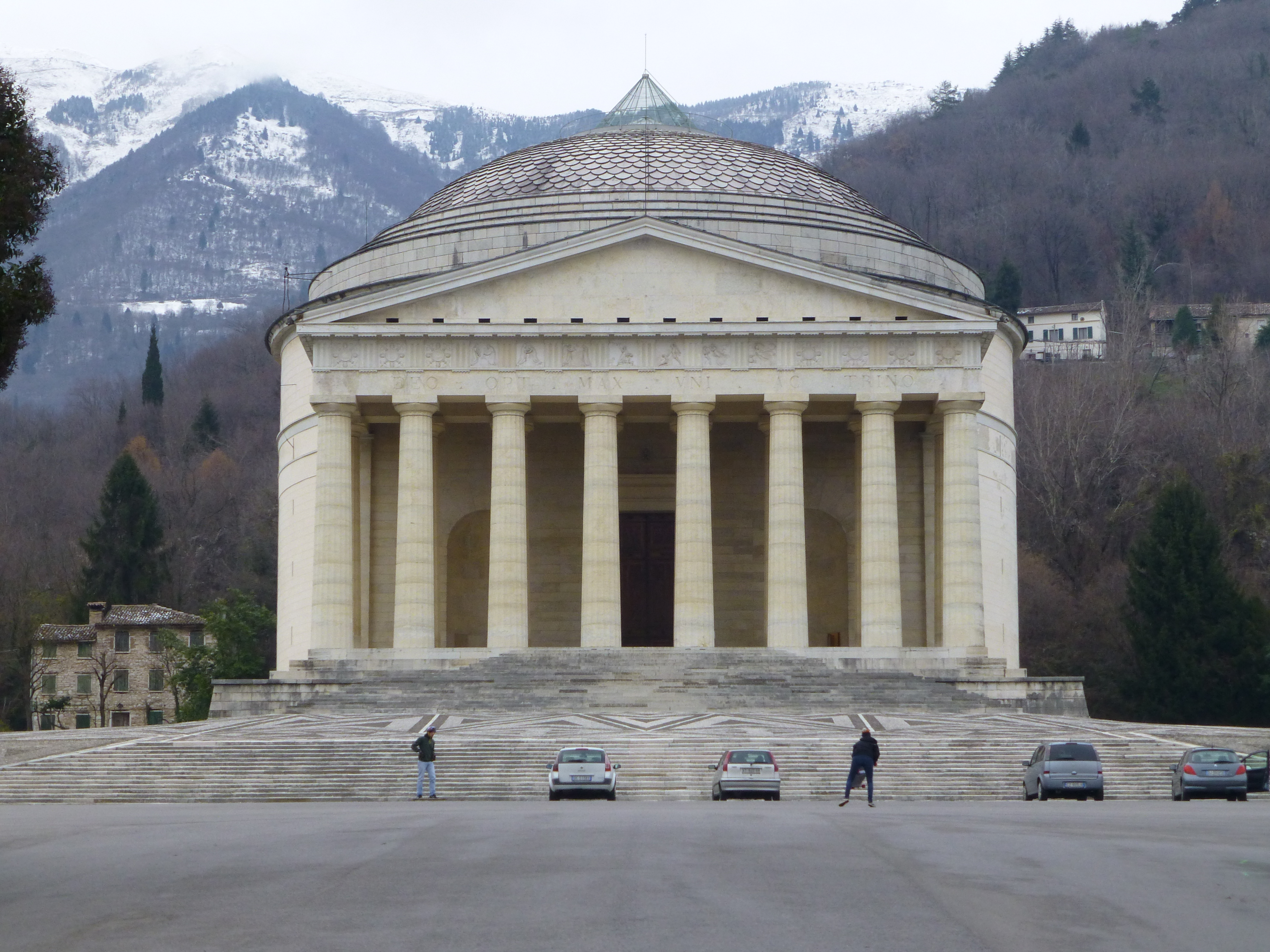
Facade of Tempio Canoviano

The Tempio Canoviano or Temple of Canova is a Roman Catholic parish church built in a severe Neoclassical style, based on the designs of Antonio Canova. It is located on a hilltop in Possagno in the Province of Treviso in the region of Veneto, Italy.

Work on the temple, which is dedicated to the Holy Trinity, began on 11 July 1819 and resumed after Canova's death in 1822 until 1830 under the supervision of abbot Giovanni Battista Sartori and architect Giuseppe Segusini. The project underwent several modifications by Pietro Bosio and Giovanni Zardo along with Giannantonio Selva and Luigi Rossini. The structure recalls the Pantheon of Rome. Canova almost single-handedly financed the site since he wished to be buried there after his request of a burial at the Rome Pantheon was denied. Upon completion in 1830 his remains were transferred to the church.

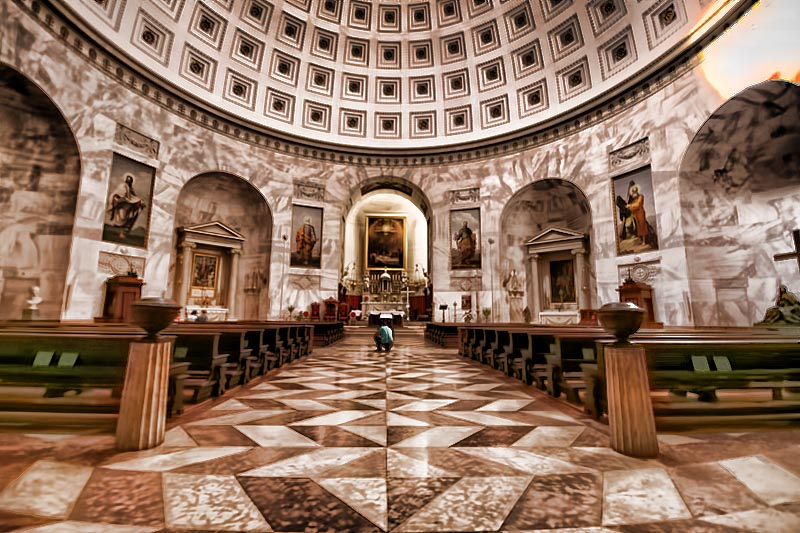
Interior Canova's Church

The atrium or pronaos is nearly 28 metres (92 ft) in size, the diameter of the interior and height of the cupola, and contains 16 doric columns. The architrave bears the Latin inscription: DEO OPT MAX UNI AC TRINO (Temple dedicated to the Optimal God, one and three). The metopes were carved by pupils from stucco casts of Canova.

The altars contain canvases from shuttered churches and monasteries including by Luca Giordano (St Francis of Paola); Palma il Giovane (Jesus in Gesthemane); Giovanni de Sacchis called il Pordenone (Madonna of the Mercies); and Andrea Vicentino (Saints Sebastian; Francis of Assisi, Roch, Anthony with the Madonna and child and a glory of angels). The bronze sculpture of the Pietà was completed by Bartolomeo Ferrari, based on models by Canova. Above the altar is a Deposition painted by Canova.
