= Venus Italica =

Sculpture in various versions by Antonio Canova

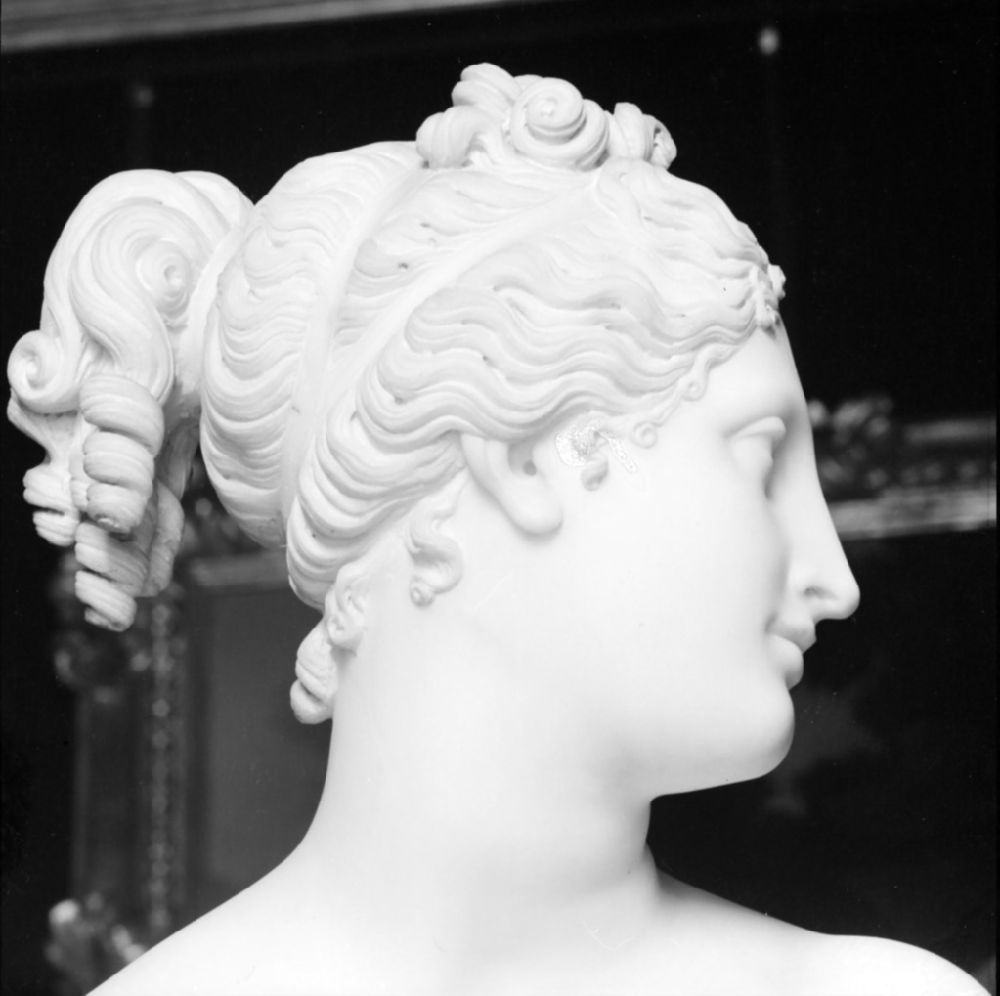
Detail of Venus Italica, 1804–1812, Galleria Palatina, Florence

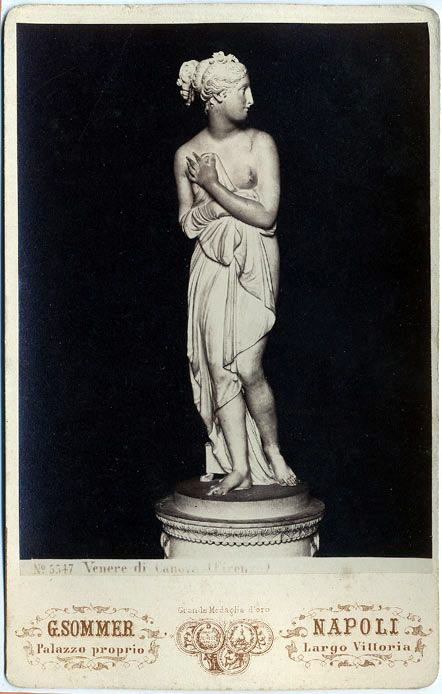
Venus Italica by Antonio Canova, completed in 1819

The Venus Italica is a marble sculpture commissioned by Napoléon Bonaparte and fashioned by Italian sculptor Antonio Canova. Canova finished the original work in 1802 and modelled two further variants which he completed in 1819. The work was to serve as a replacement for the Venus de Medici sculpture, a copy of an antique work by Cleomenes of Athens, which had been seized, taken to France and placed in the Louvre in 1802 by orders of Bonaparte. After Napoleon's abdication the Venus de Medici was returned to Italy on 27 December 1815 and is since on display in the Room of Venus in the Galleria Palatina at the Palazzo Pitti in Florence.

== History ==
Early 19th century president of the Accademia di Belle Arti di Firenze (Florence Academy of Fine Arts) Count Giovanni degli Alessandri encouraged the ingenious Neoclassical sculptor Antonio Canova to create a copy of the Venus de Medici. Canova approved and set to work on the Venus Italica, which is considered to be one of his masterpieces in both, artistic conception and craftship.

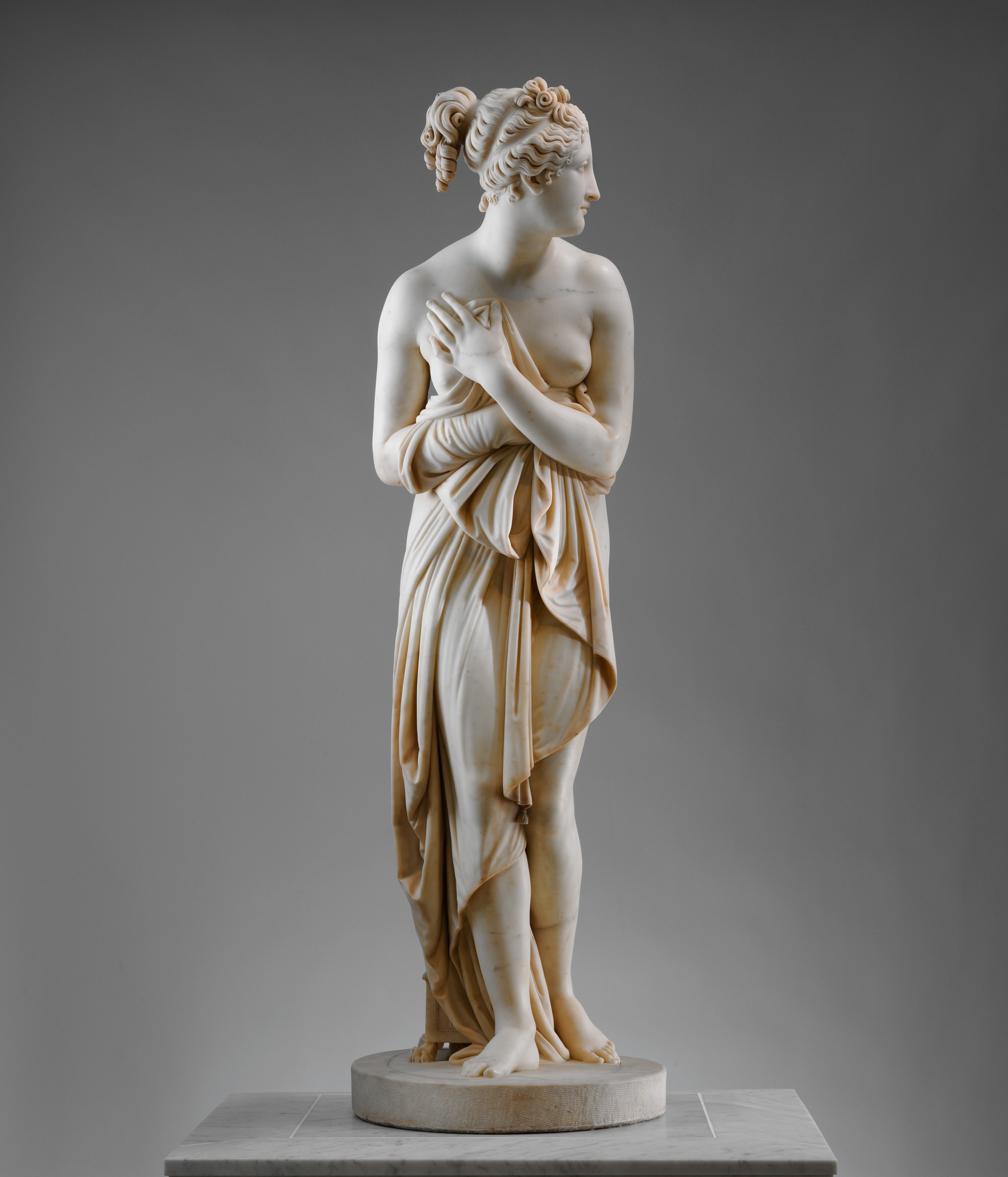
Replica of Venus Italica, c. 1822–23, Metropolitan Museum of Art

According to art critic Edward Lucie-Smith the artistic expression of sexual vulnerability is conveyed better than on the original Venus de Medici. Most viewers have noticed Canova's superior craftmanship on marble surfaces and textures. His unique technique and ability to achieve the illusion of human flesh has been called the Direct touch. Canova would eventually begin to display his studio works in candlelight. Intrigued by the effects of the light and shade of the candles on the translucent marble surface Canova soon began to further soften the transitions between the various parts of the statue and rub them down with special tools and pumice stone, sometimes for weeks or months. Finally he would apply an unknown compound of patina onto the flesh of the sculpture to lighten the skin tone. This process has been called the Last touch.
