= Antonio Canova =

Italian Neoclassical sculptor (1757–1822)

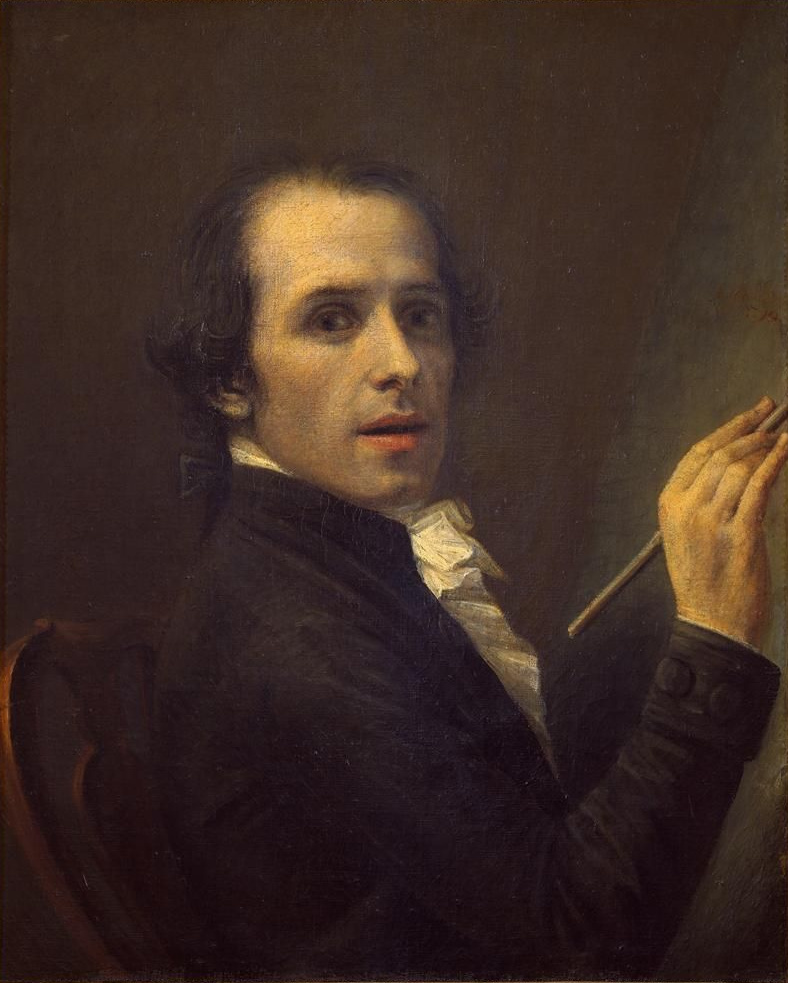
- Self-portrait, 1792
- Born: Antonio Canova; 1 November 1757; Possagno, Republic of Venice
- Died: 13 October 1822 (aged 64); Venice, Lombardy–Venetia, Austrian Empire
- Known for: Sculpture
- Notable work: Psyche Revived by Cupid's Kiss; The Three Graces; Napoleon as Mars the Peacemaker; Venus Victrix; George Washington
- Movement: Neoclassicism

Antonio Canova (Italian pronunciation: [anˈtɔːnjo kaˈnɔːva]; 1 November 1757 – 13 October 1822) was an Italian Neoclassical sculptor, famous for his marble sculptures. Often regarded as the greatest of the Neoclassical artists, his sculpture was inspired by the Baroque and the classical revival, and has been characterised as having avoided the melodramatics of the former, and the cold artificiality of the latter.

== Life and career ==
=== Possagno ===
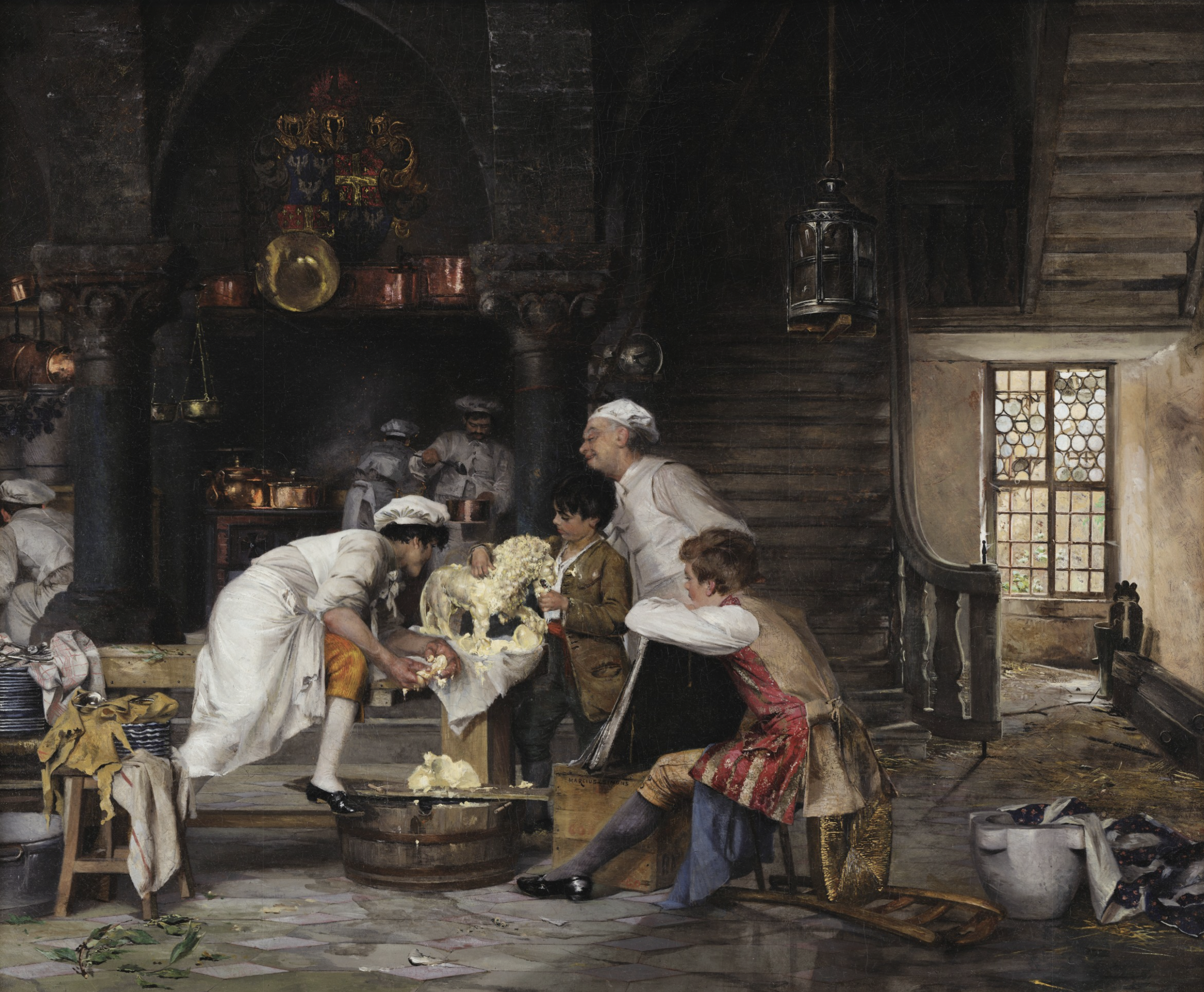
Pinckney Marcius-Simons, The Child Canova Modeling a Lion Out of Butter, c. 1885

In 1757, Antonio Canova was born in the Venetian Republic city of Possagno to Pietro Canova, a stonecutter, and Angela Zardo Fantolin. In 1761, his father died. A year later, his mother remarried. In 1762, he was put into the care of his paternal grandfather Pasino Canova, who was a stonemason, owner of a "sculptor who specialized in altars with statues and low reliefs in late Baroque style". He led Antonio into the art of sculpting.

Before the age of ten, Canova began making models in clay, and carving marble. Indeed, at the age of nine, he executed two small shrines of Carrara marble that are still extant. After these works, he appears to have been constantly employed under his grandfather.

=== Venice ===
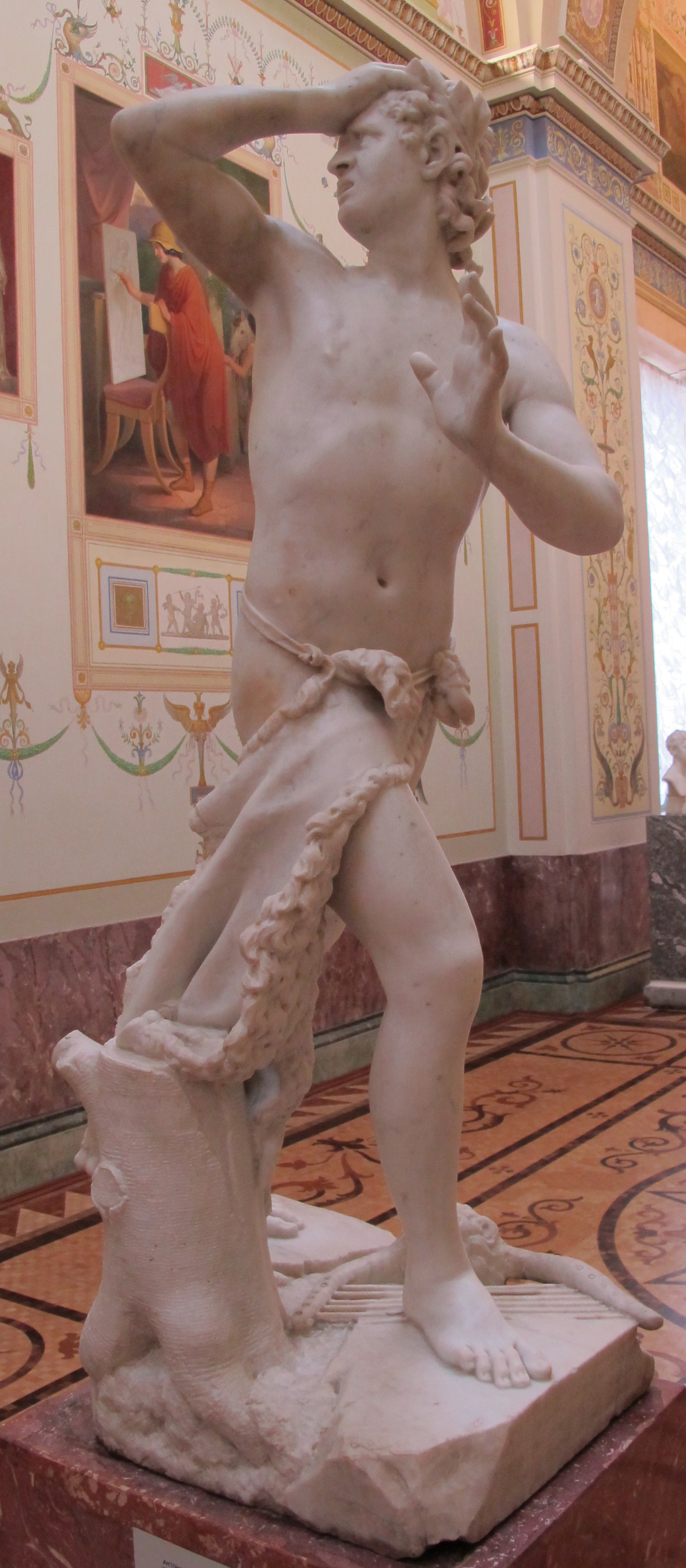
Orpheus, 1777

In 1770, he was an apprentice for two years to Giuseppe Bernardi, who was also known as 'Torretto'. Afterwards, he was under the tutelage of Giovanni Ferrari until he began his studies at the Accademia di Belle Arti di Venezia. At the academy, he won several prizes. During this time, he was given his first workshop within a monastery by some local monks.

The Senator Giovanni Falier commissioned Canova to produce statues of Orpheus and Eurydice for his garden – the Villa Falier at Asolo. The statues were begun in 1775, and both were completed by 1777. The pieces exemplify the late Rococo style. On the year of their completion, both works were exhibited for the Feast of the Ascension in Piazza San Marco. Widely praised, the works won Canova his first renown among the Venetian elite. Another Venetian who is said to have commissioned early works from Canova was the abate Filippo Farsetti, whose collection at Ca' Farsetti on the Grand Canal he frequented.

In 1779, Canova opened his own studio at Calle Del Traghetto at S. Maurizio. At this time, Procurator Pietro Vettor Pisani commissioned Canova's first marble statue: a depiction of Daedalus and Icarus. The statue inspired great admiration for his work at the annual art fair; Canova was paid 100 gold zecchini for the completed work. At the base of the statue, Daedalus' tools are scattered about; these tools are also an allusion to Sculpture, of which the statue is a personification. With such an intention, there is suggestion that Daedalus is a portrait of Canova's grandfather Pasino.

=== Rome ===
Canova arrived in Rome, on 28 December 1780. Prior to his departure, his friends had applied to the Venetian Senate for a pension. Successful in the application, the stipend allotted amounted to three hundred ducats, limited to three years.

While in Rome, Canova spent time studying and sketching the works of Michelangelo.

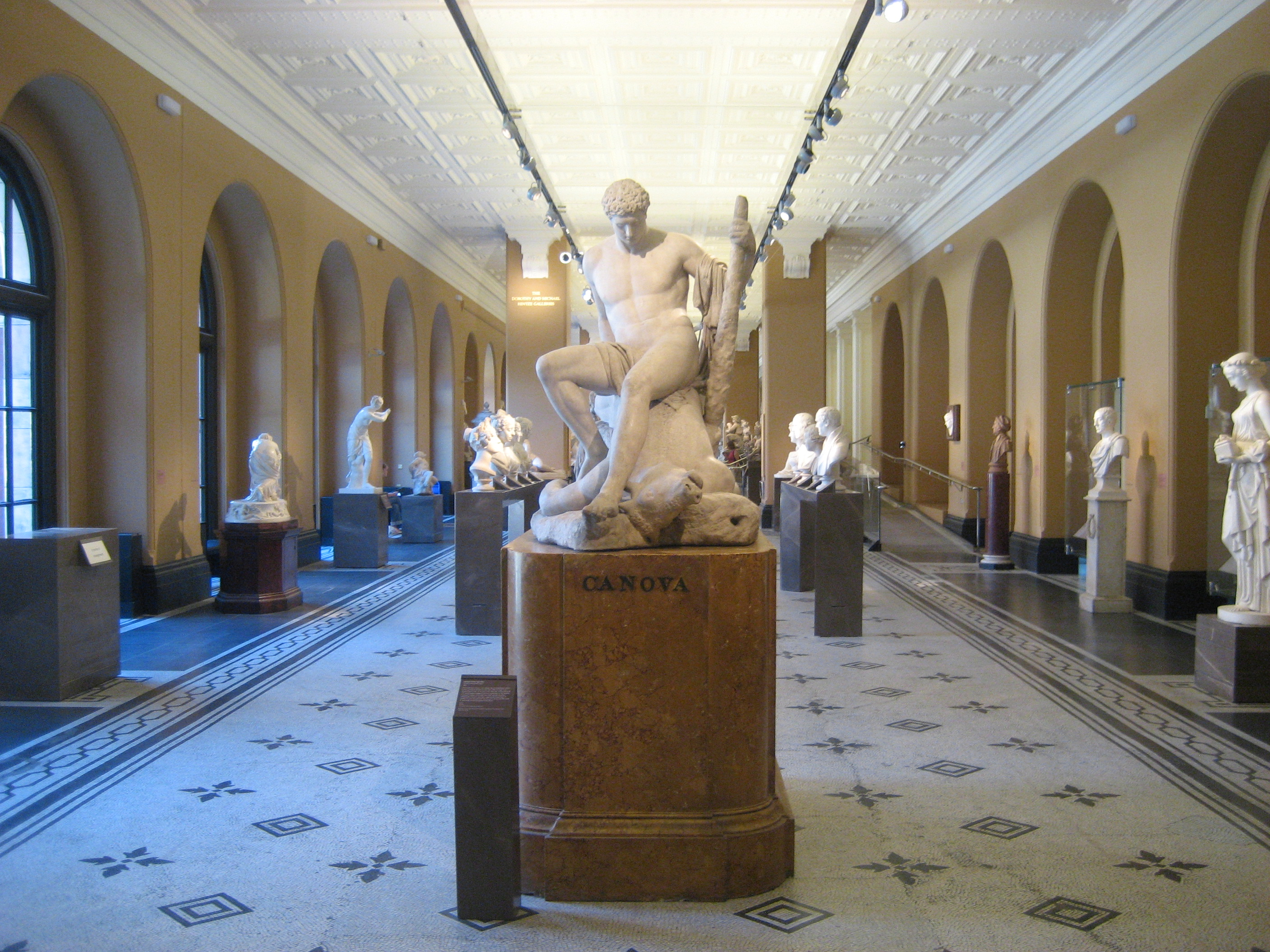
Theseus and the Minotaur, Victoria and Albert Museum, London

In 1781, Girolamo Zulian – the Venetian ambassador to Rome – hired Canova to sculpt Theseus and the Minotaur. Zulian played a fundamental role in Canova's rise to fame, turning some rooms of his palace into a studio for the artist and placing his trust in him despite Canova's early critics in Rome. The statue depicts the victorious Theseus seated on the lifeless body of a Minotaur. The initial spectators were certain that the work was a copy of a Greek original, and were shocked to learn it was a contemporary work. The highly regarded work is now in the collection of the Victoria & Albert Museum, in London.

Between 1783 and 1785, Canova arranged, composed, and designed a funerary monument dedicated to Clement XIV for the Church of Santi Apostoli. After another two years, the work met completion in 1787. The monument secured Canova's reputation as the pre-eminent living artist.

In 1792, he completed another cenotaph, this time commemorating Clement XIII for St. Peter's Basilica. Canova harmonized its design with the older Baroque funerary monuments in the basilica.

In 1790, he began to work on a funerary monument for Titian, which was eventually abandoned by 1795. During the same year, he increased his activity as a painter. Canova was notoriously disinclined to restore sculptures. However, in 1794 he made an exception for his friend and early patron Zulian, restoring a few sculptures that Zulian had moved from Rome to Venice.

The following decade was extremely productive, beginning works such as Hercules and Lichas, Cupid and Psyche, Hebe, Tomb of Duchess Maria Christina of Saxony-Teschen, and The Penitent Magdalene.

In 1797, he went to Vienna, but only a year later, in 1798, he returned to Possagno for a year. (Note: The Glory of Venice: Art in the Eighteenth Century states (p. 441) that Canova left Venice when it fell, tried to escape to America and then went to Possagno. The fall of Venice was in 1797. There appears to be some gap in knowledge that would correct or amend these accounts. The first reference to Vienna is an online source, the second is the Encyclopædia Britannica, 1911 which has already proven itself incorrect in some areas. The Glory of Venice has proven itself more accurate, but it is undated, leaving speculation of time frame.)

=== France and England ===
By 1800, Canova was the most celebrated artist in Europe. He systematically promoted his reputation by publishing engravings of his works and having marble versions of plaster casts made in his workshop. He became so successful that he had acquired patrons from across Europe including France, England, Russia, Austria and Holland, as well as several members from different royal lineages, and prominent individuals. Among his patrons were Napoleon and his family, for whom Canova produced much work, including several depictions between 1803 and 1809. The most notable representations were that of Napoleon as Mars the Peacemaker, and Venus Victrix which was a portrayal of Pauline Bonaparte.

Napoleon as Mars the Peacemaker had its inception after Canova was hired to make a bust of Napoleon in 1802. The statue was begun in 1803, with Napoleon requesting to be shown in a French General's uniform, Canova rejected this, insisting on an allusion to Mars, the Roman god of War. It was completed in 1806. In 1811, the statue arrived in Paris, but not installed; neither was its bronze copy in the Foro Napoleonico in Milan. In 1815, the original went to the Duke of Wellington, after his victory at Waterloo against Napoleon.

If one could make statues by caressing marble, I would say that this statue was formed by wearing out the marble that surrounded it with caresses and kiss

— Joséphine de Beauharnais on the Venus Victrix

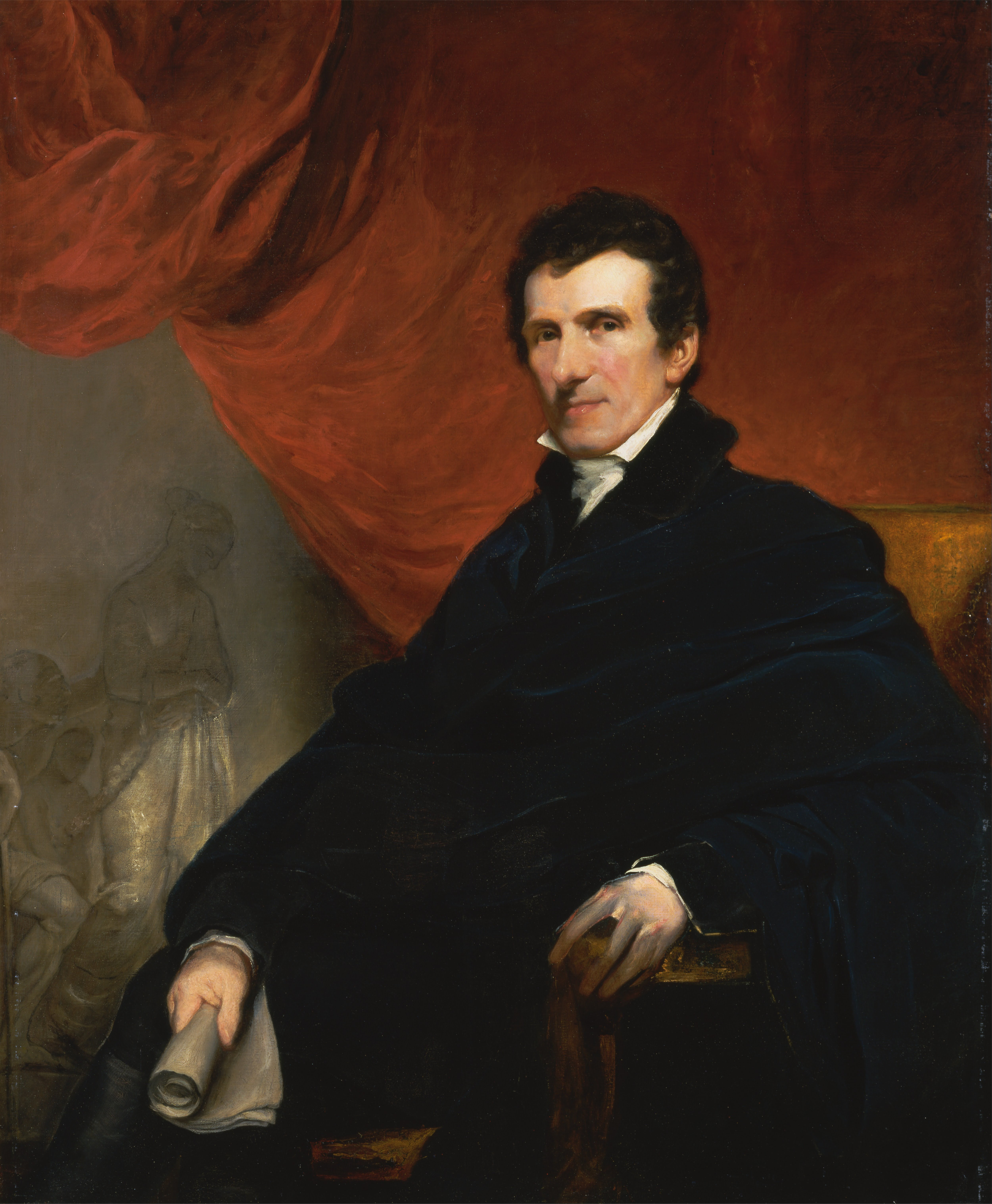
Portrait of Antonio Canova by John Jackson, 1820

Venus Victrix was originally conceived as a robed and recumbent sculpture of Pauline Borghese in the guise of Diana. Instead, Pauline ordered Canova to make the statue a nude Venus. The work was not intended for public viewing.

Other works for the Napoleon family include, a bust of Napoleon, a statue of Napoleon's mother, and Marie Louise as Concordia.

In 1802, Canova was assigned the post of 'Inspector-General of Antiquities and Fine Art of the Papal State', a position formerly held by Raphael. One of his activities in this capacity was to pioneer the restoration of the Appian Way by restoring the tomb of Servilius Quartus. In 1808 Canova became an associated member of the Royal Institute of Sciences, Literature and Fine Arts of the Kingdom of Holland.

In 1814, he began his The Three Graces.

In 1815, he was named 'Minister Plenipotentiary of the Pope,' and was tasked by Pope Pius VII with recovering various works of art that were taken to Paris by Napoleon under the terms of the Treaty of Paris (1815). At the Louvre, he faced resistance to restitution from Director Vivant Denon and, due to the works' large size or unclear location, was forced to leave behind major pieces, such as Paolo Veronese's painting The Wedding at Cana.

The works of Phidias are truly flesh and blood, like beautiful nature itself

— Antonio Canova

Also in 1815, he visited London, and met with Benjamin Haydon. It was after the advice of Canova that the Elgin Marbles were acquired by the British Museum, with plaster copies sent to Florence, according to Canova's request.

=== Returning to Italy ===
In 1816, Canova returned to Rome with some of the art Napoleon had taken. He was rewarded with several marks of distinction: he was appointed President of the Accademia di San Luca, inscribed into the "Golden Book of Roman Nobles" by the Pope's own hands, and given the title of Marquis of Ischia, alongside an annual pension of 3,000 crowns.

In 1819, he commenced and completed his commissioned work Venus Italica as a replacement for the Venus de' Medici.

After his 1814 proposal to build a personified statue of Religion for St. Peter's Basilica was rejected, Canova sought to build his own temple to house it. This project came to be the Tempio Canoviano. Canova designed, financed, and partly built the structure himself. The structure was to be a testament to Canova's piety. The building's design was inspired by combining the Parthenon and the Pantheon together. On 11 July 1819, Canova laid the foundation stone dressed in red Papal uniform and decorated with all his medals. It first opened in 1830, and was finally completed in 1836. After the foundation-stone of this edifice had been laid, Canova returned to Rome; but every succeeding autumn he continued to visit Possagno to direct the workmen and encourage them with rewards.

During the period that intervened between commencing operations at Possagno and his death, he executed or finished some of his most striking works. Among these were the group Mars and Venus, the colossal figure of Pius VI, the Pietà, the St John, and a colossal bust of his friend, the Count Leopoldo Cicognara.

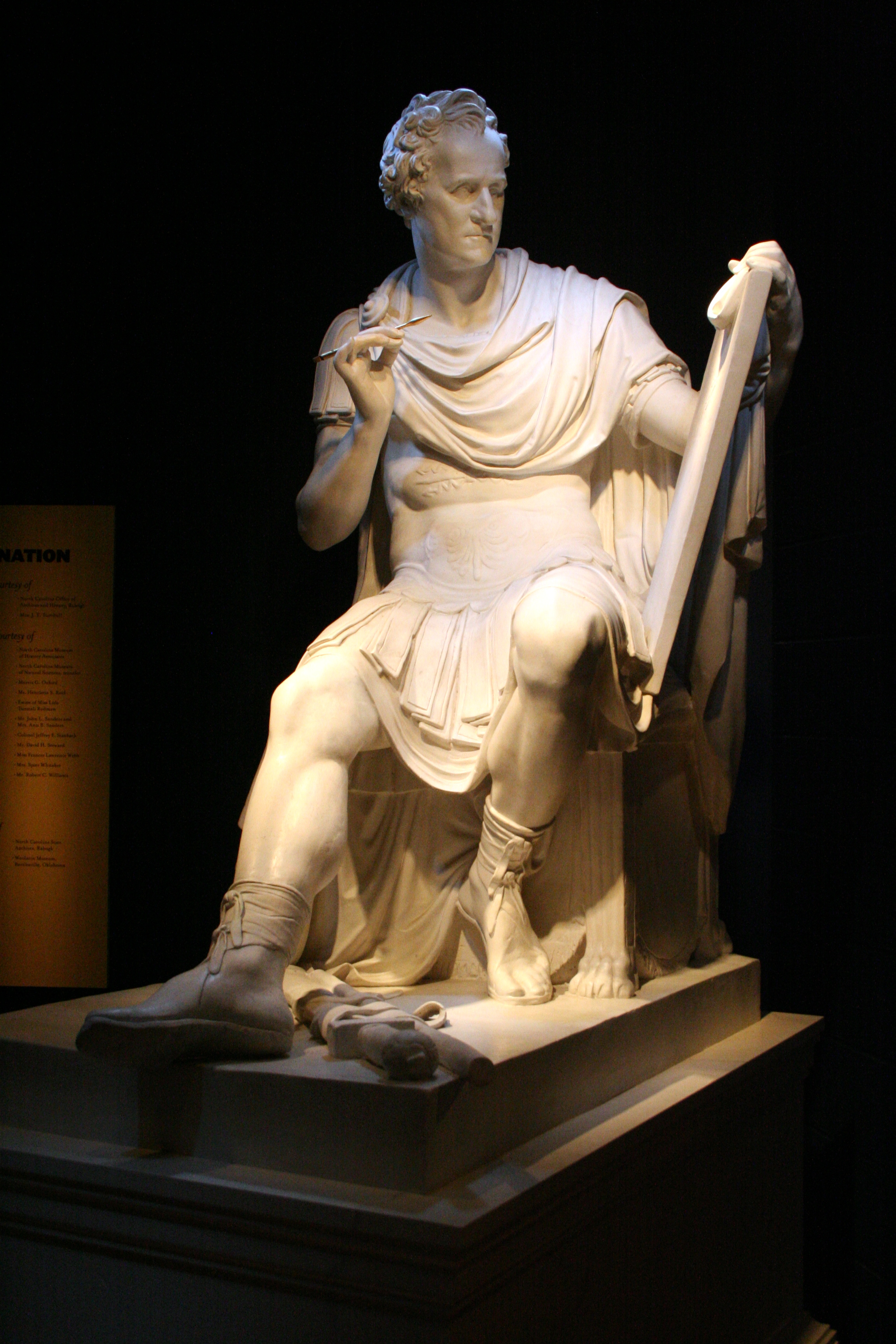
George Washington, plaster replica on display at the North Carolina Museum of History

In 1820, he made a statue of George Washington for the state of North Carolina. As recommended by Thomas Jefferson, the sculptor used the marble bust of Washington by Giuseppe Ceracchi as a model. It was delivered on 24 December 1821. The statue and the North Carolina State House where it was displayed were later destroyed by fire in 1831. A plaster replica was sent by King Victor Emmanuel III of Italy in 1910, now on view at the North Carolina Museum of History. A marble copy was sculpted by Romano Vio in 1970, now on view in the rotunda of the capitol building.

In 1822, he journeyed to Naples, to superintend the construction of wax moulds for an equestrian statue of Ferdinand VII. The adventure was disastrous to his health, but soon became healthy enough to return to Rome. From there, he voyaged to Venice; however, on 13 October 1822, he died there at the age of 64. As he never married, the name became extinct, except through his stepbrothers' lineage of Satori-Canova.

On 12 October 1822, Canova instructed his brother to use his entire estate to complete the Tempio in Possagno.

On 25 October 1822, his body was placed in the Tempio Canoviano. His heart was interred at the Basilica di Santa Maria Gloriosa dei Frari in Venice, and his right hand preserved in a vase at the Accademia di Belle Arti di Venezia.

His memorial service was so grand that it rivaled the ceremony that the city of Florence held for Michelangelo in 1564.

In 1826, Giovanni Battista Sartori sold Canova's Roman studio and took every plaster model and sculpture to Possagno, where they were installed in the gypsotheque of the Tempio Canoviano.

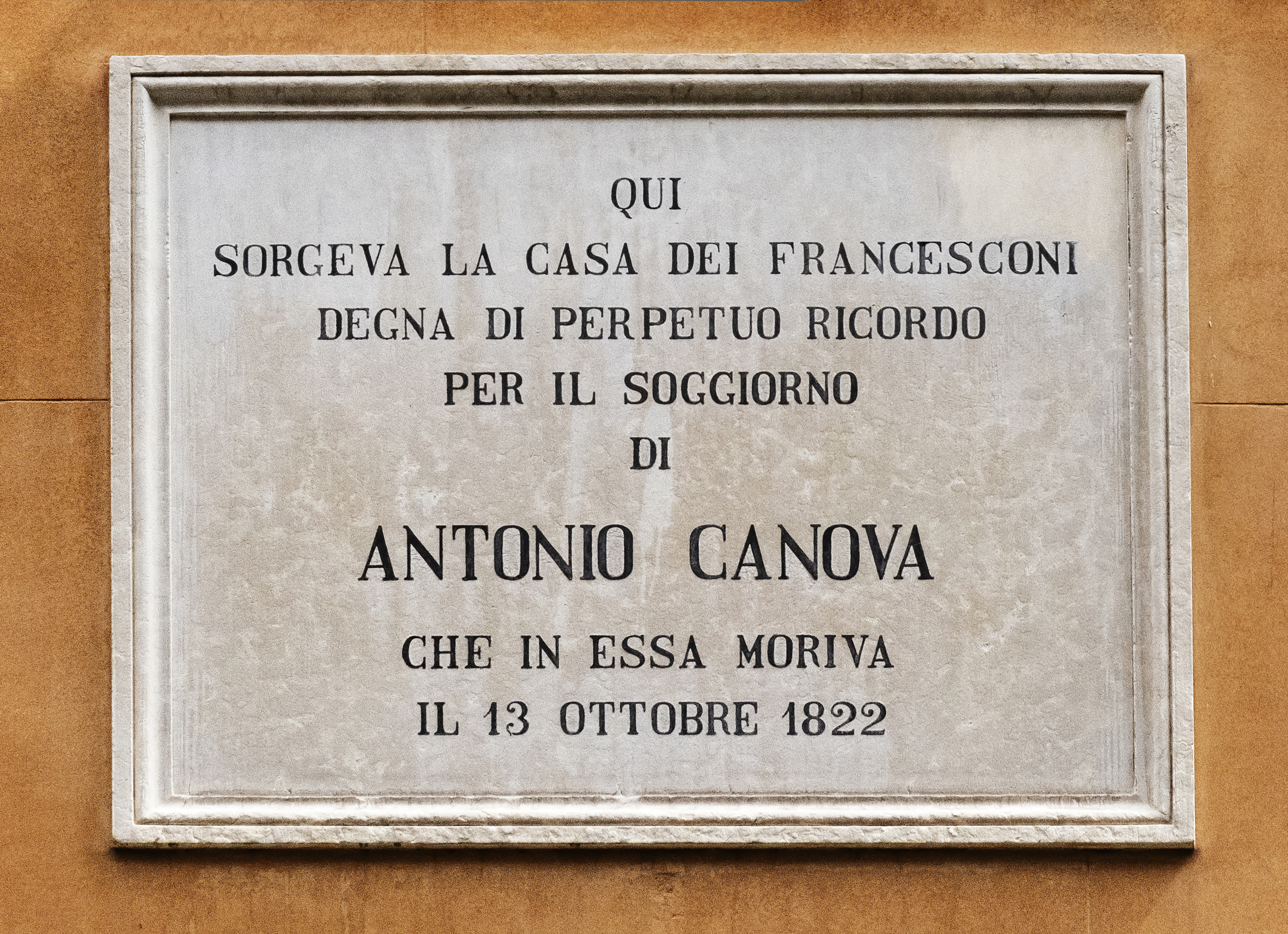
Commemorative plaque at the place of life and death of Antonio Canova, in Rio Orseolo o del Corval

== Works ==
Among Canova's most notable works are:

=== Psyche Revived by Cupid's Kiss (1787) ===
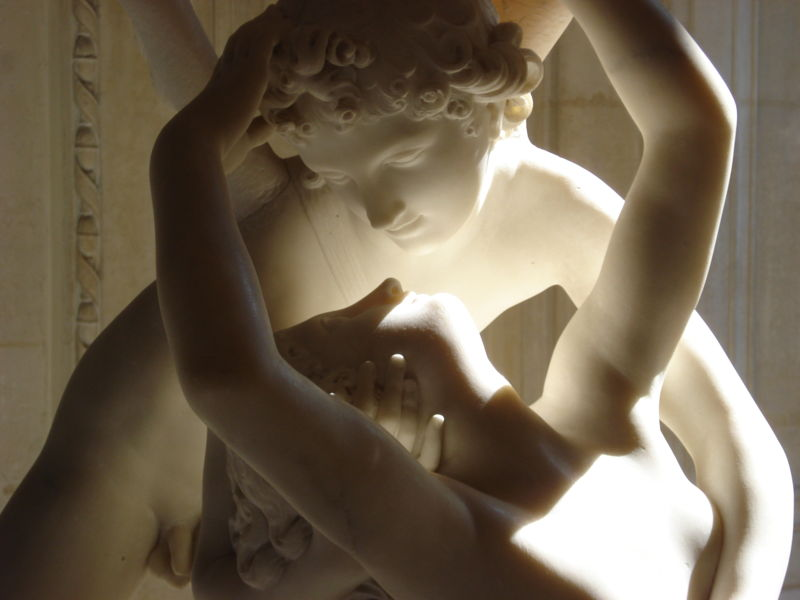
Detail of Psyche Revived by Cupid's Kiss

Psyche Revived by Cupid's Kiss was commissioned in 1787 by Colonel John Campbell. It is regarded as a masterpiece of Neoclassical sculpture, but shows the mythological lovers at a moment of great emotion, characteristic of the emerging movement of Romanticism. It represents the god Cupid in the height of love and tenderness, immediately after awakening the lifeless Psyche with a kiss.

=== Napoleon as Mars the Peacemaker (1802–1806) ===
Napoleon as Mars the Peacemaker had its inception after Canova was hired to make a bust of Napoleon in 1802. The statue was begun in 1802, with Napoleon requesting to be shown in a French General's uniform, Canova rejected this, insisting on an allusion to Mars, the Roman god of War. It was completed in 1806. In 1811, the statue arrived in Paris, but not installed; neither was its bronze copy in the Foro Napoleonico in Milan. In 1815, the original went to the Duke of Wellington, after his victory at Waterloo against Napoleon and is on display at Apsley House.

=== Perseus Triumphant (1804–1806) ===
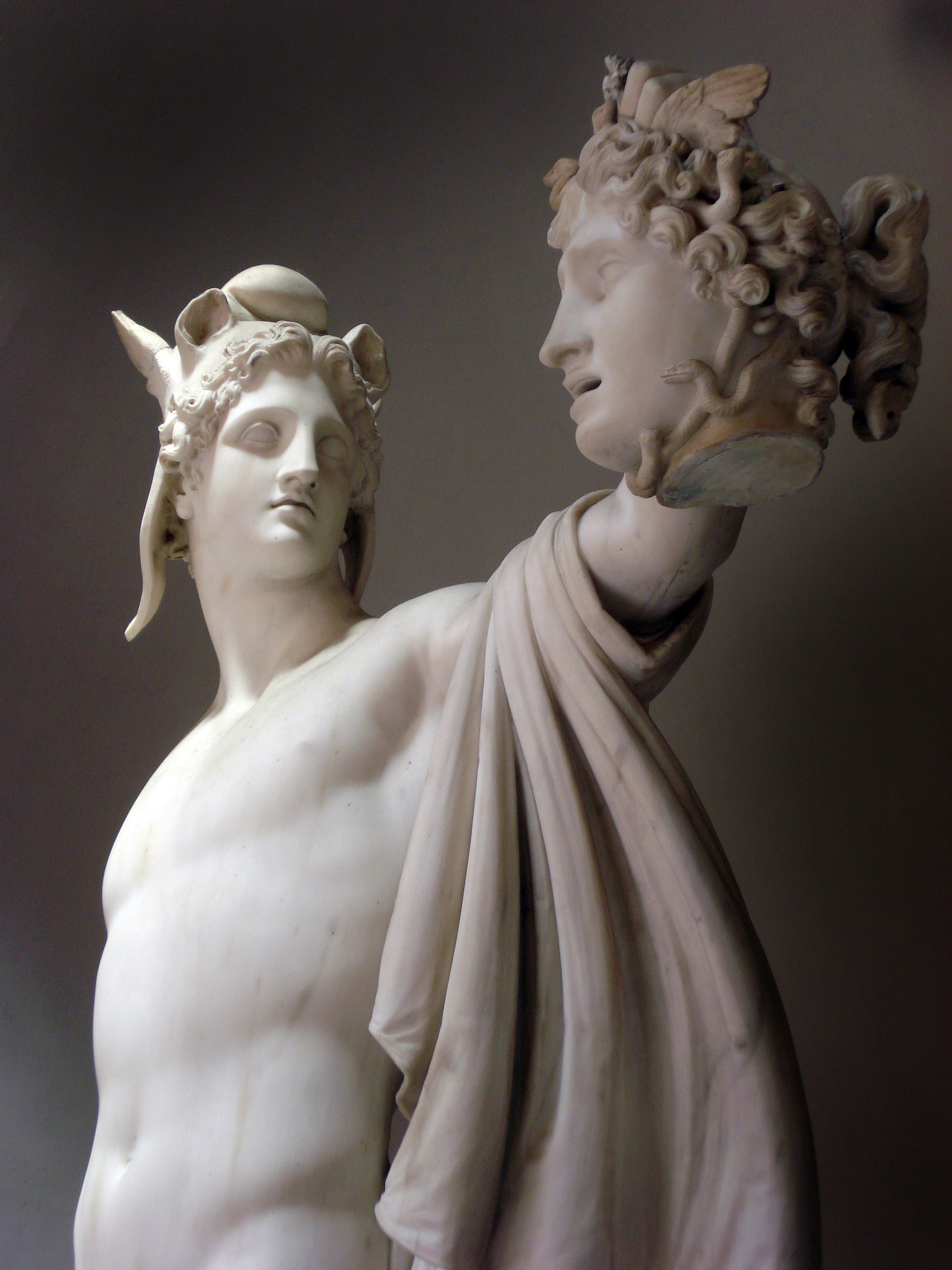
Detail of Perseus with the Head of Medusa

Perseus Triumphant, sometimes called Perseus with the Head of Medusa, was a statue commissioned by tribune Onorato Duveyriez. It depicts the Greek hero Perseus after his victory over the Gorgon Medusa.

The statue was based freely on the Apollo Belvedere and the Medusa Rondanini.

Napoleon, after his 1796 Italian Campaign, took the Apollo Belvedere to Paris. In the statue's absence, Pope Pius VII acquired Canova's Perseus Triumphant and placed the work upon the Apollo's pedestal. The statue was so successful that when the Apollo was returned, Perseus remained as a companion piece.

One replica of the statue was commissioned from Canova by the Polish countess Waleria Tarnowska; it's now displayed in the Metropolitan Museum of Art in New York City.

Karl Ludwig Fernow said of the statue that "every eye must rest with pleasure on the beautiful surface, even when the mind finds its hopes of high and pure enjoyment disappointed."

=== Venus Victrix (1805–1808) ===
Venus Victrix ranks among the most famous of Canova's works. Originally, Canova wished the depiction to be of a robed Diana, but Pauline Borghese insisted to appear as a nude Venus. The work was not intended for public viewing.

=== The Three Graces (1814–1817) ===
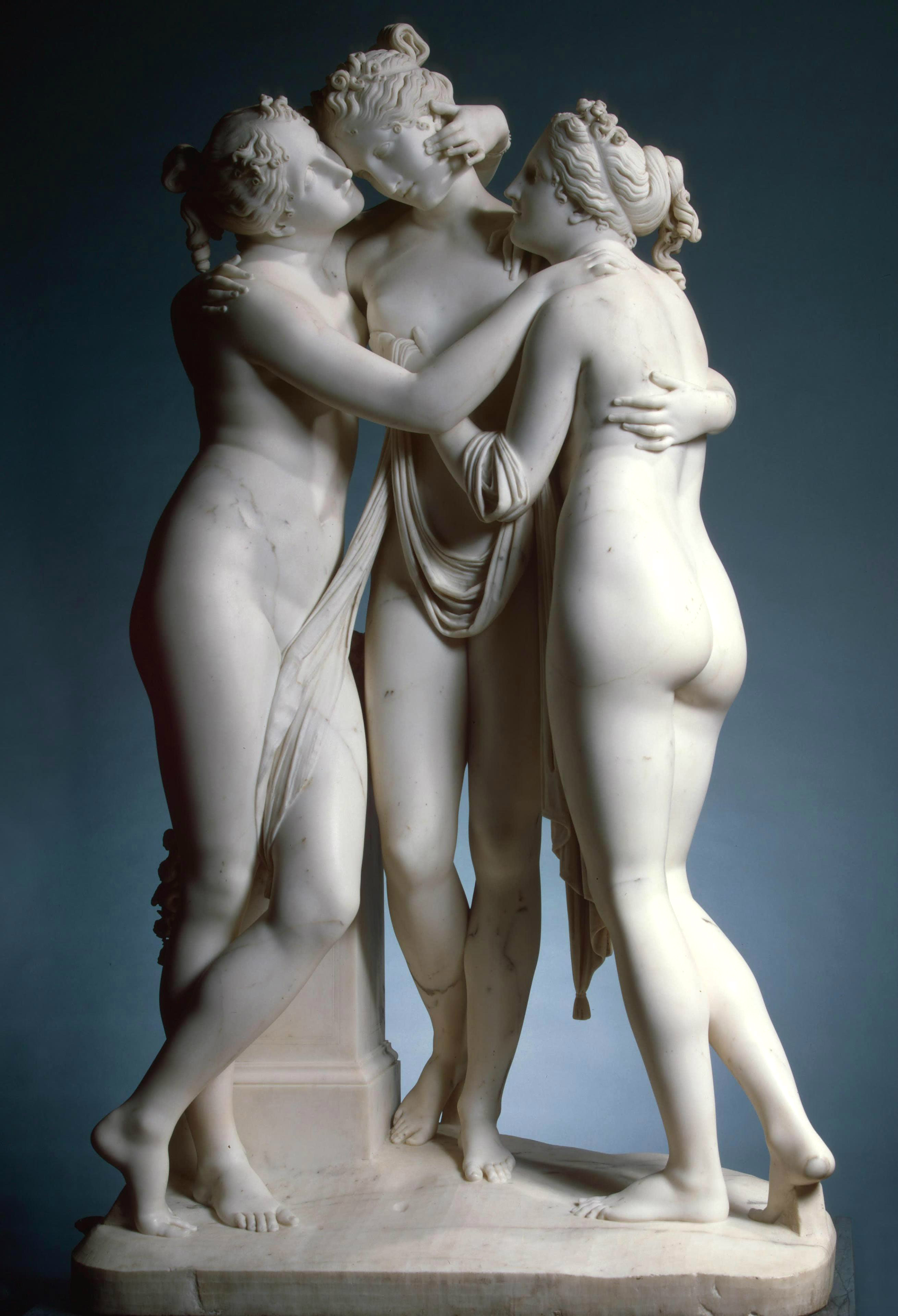
The Three Graces

John Russell, the 6th Duke of Bedford, commissioned a version of the now famous work. He had previously visited Canova in his studio in Rome in 1814 and had been immensely impressed by a carving of the Graces the sculptor had made for the Empress Joséphine. When the Empress died in May of the same year he immediately offered to purchase the completed piece, but was unsuccessful as Josephine's son Eugène de Beauharnais claimed it (his son Maximilian, Duke of Leuchtenberg brought it to St. Petersburg, where it can now be found in the Hermitage Museum). Undeterred, the Duke commissioned another version for himself.

The sculpting process began in 1814 and was completed in 1817. Finally in 1819 it was installed at the Duke's residence in Woburn Abbey. Canova even made the trip over to England to supervise its installation, choosing for it to be displayed on a pedestal adapted from a marble plinth with a rotating top. This version is now owned jointly by the Victoria and Albert Museum and the National Galleries of Scotland, and is alternately displayed at each.

== Artistic process ==
Canova had a distinct, signature style in which he combined Greek and Roman art practices with early stirrings of romanticism to delve into a new path of Neoclassicism. Canova's sculptures fall into three categories: Heroic compositions, compositions of grace, and sepulchral monuments. In each of these, Canova's underlying artistic motivations were to challenge, if not compete, with classical statues.

Canova refused to take in pupils and students, but would hire workers to carve the initial figure from the marble. According to art historian Giuseppe Pavanello, "Canova's system of work concentrated on the initial idea, and on the final carving of the marble". He had an elaborate system of comparative pointing so that the workers were able to reproduce the plaster form in the selected block of marble. These workers would leave a thin veil over the entire statue so Canova's could focus on the surface of the statue.

While he worked, he had people read to him select literary and historical texts.

== Last touch ==
The polish throws upon the parts which are lighted so great brilliancy as frequently to make invisible the most laborious diligence; it cannot be seen, because the strong reflected light dazzles the eyes

— Johann Joachim Winckelmann

During the last quarter of the eighteenth century, it became fashionable to view art galleries at night by torchlight. Canova was an artist that leapt on the fad and displayed his works of art in his studio by candlelight. As such, Canova would begin to finalize the statue with special tools by candlelight, to soften the transitions between the various parts of the nude. After a little recarving, he began to rub the statue down with pumice stone, sometimes for periods longer than weeks or months. If that was not enough, he would use tripoli (rottenstone) and lead.

He then applied a now unknown chemical-composition of patina onto the flesh of the figure to lighten the skin tone. Importantly, his friends also denied any usage of acids in his process.

== Criticisms ==
Conversations revolving around the justification of art as superfluous usually invoked the name of Canova. Karl Ludwig Fernow believed that Canova was not Kantian enough in his aesthetic, because emphasis seemed to have been placed on agreeableness rather than Beauty. Canova was faulted for creating works that were artificial in complexity.

== Legacy ==
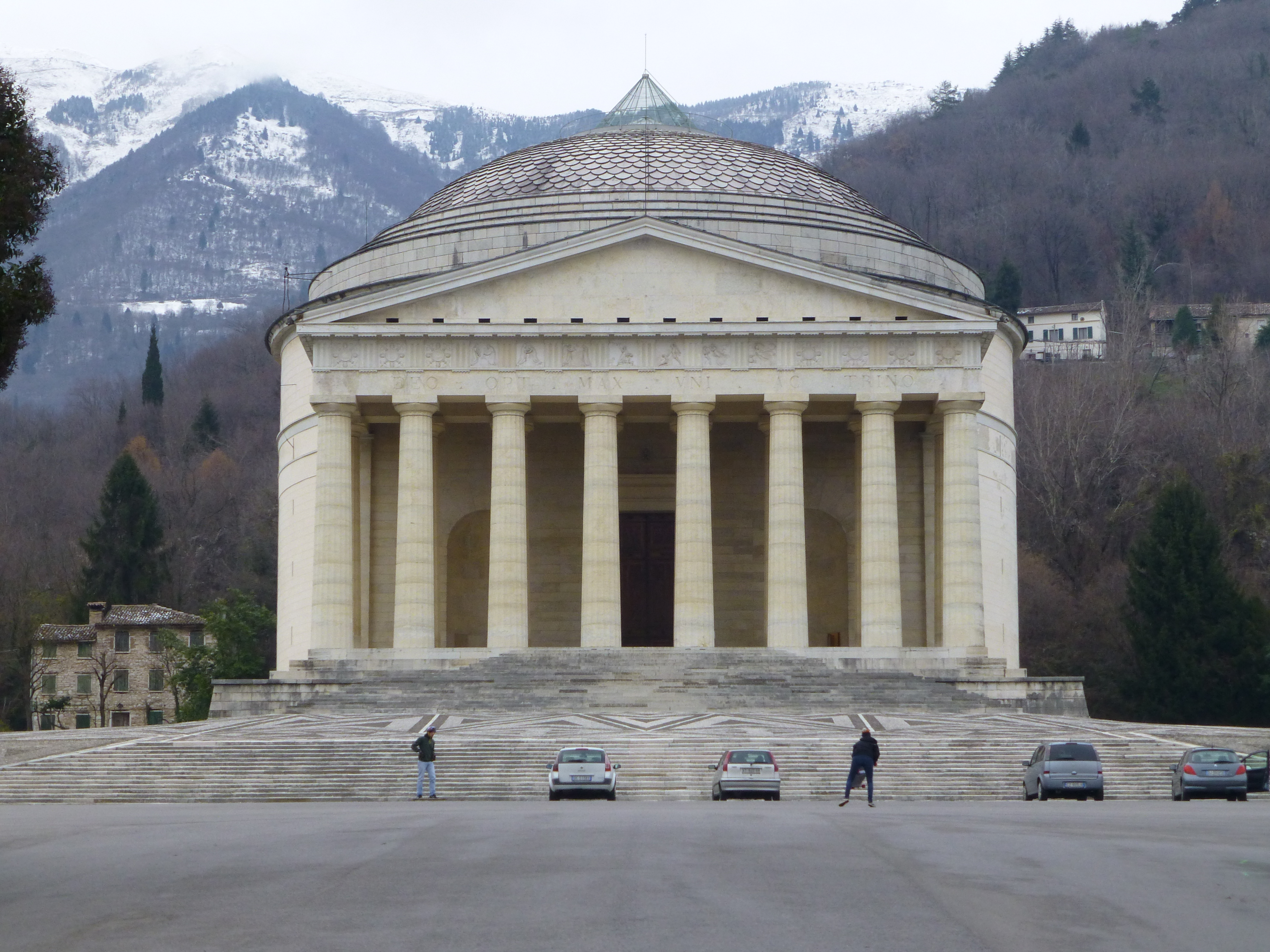
Facade of Tempio Canoviano

Although the Romantic period artists buried Canova's name soon after he died, he is slowly being rediscovered. Giuseppe Pavanello wrote in 1996 that "the importance and value of Canova's art is now recognized as holding in balance the last echo of the Ancients and the first symptom of the restless experimentation of the modern age".

Canova spent large parts of his fortune helping young students and sending patrons to struggling sculptors, including Sir Richard Westmacott and John Gibson.

He was introduced into various orders of chivalry.

A number of his works, sketches, and writings are collected in the Sala Canoviana of the Museo Civico of Bassano del Grappa. Other works, including plaster casts are the Museo Canoviano in Asolo.

In 2018, a crater on Mercury was named in his honor.

== Literary inspirations ==
Two of Canova's works appear as engravings in Fisher's Drawing Room Scrap Book, 1834, with poetical illustrations by Letitia Elizabeth Landon. These are of The Dancing Girl and Hebe.

== Commemorations ==
- Canova, South Dakota
- Via Antonio Canova, in Treviso
- Aeroporto di Treviso A. Canova
- The Museo Canova in Possagno
- Tempio Canoviano, in Possagno

== Gallery ==
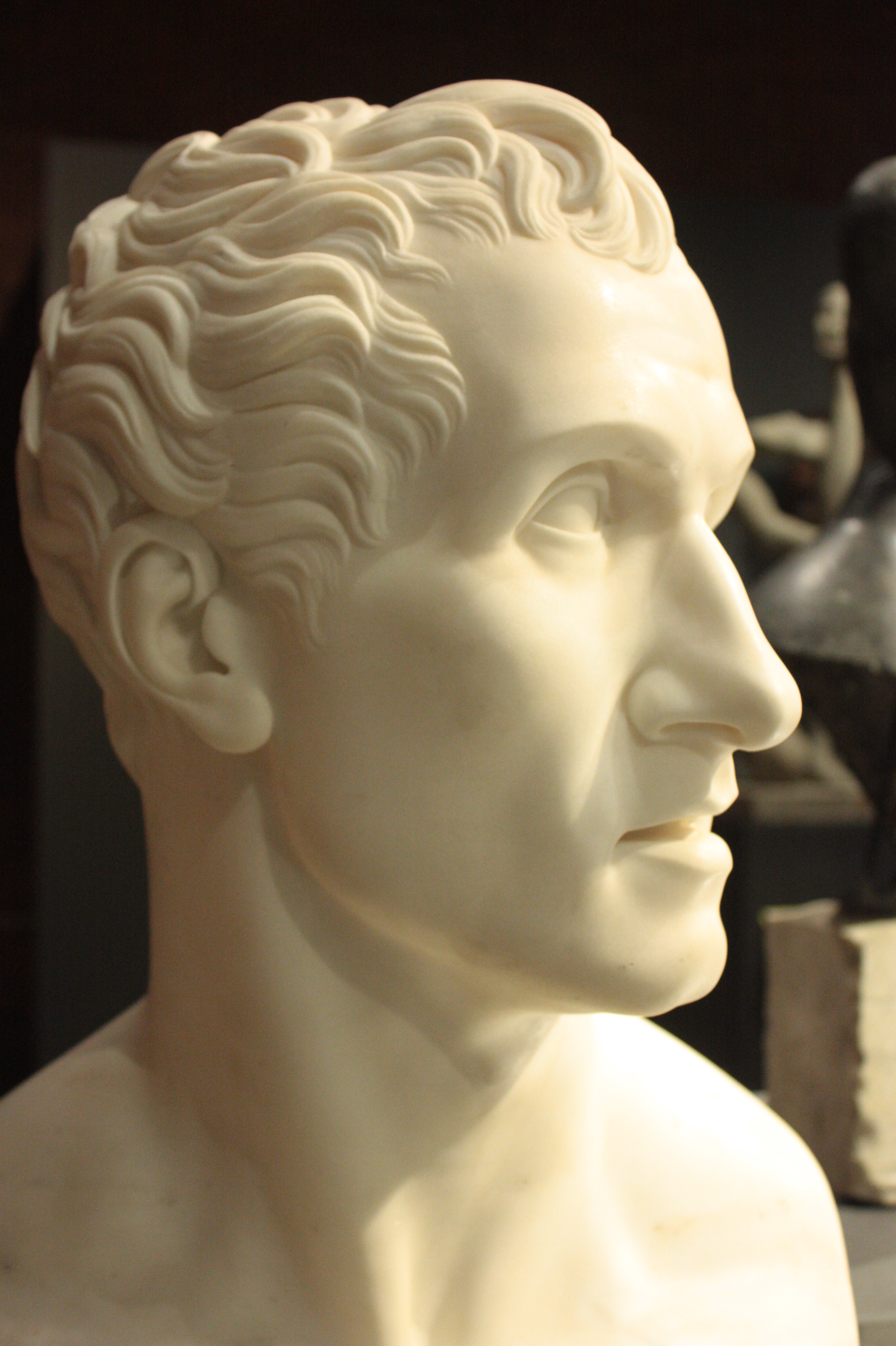
Antonio Canova from the studio of Canova, c. 1813

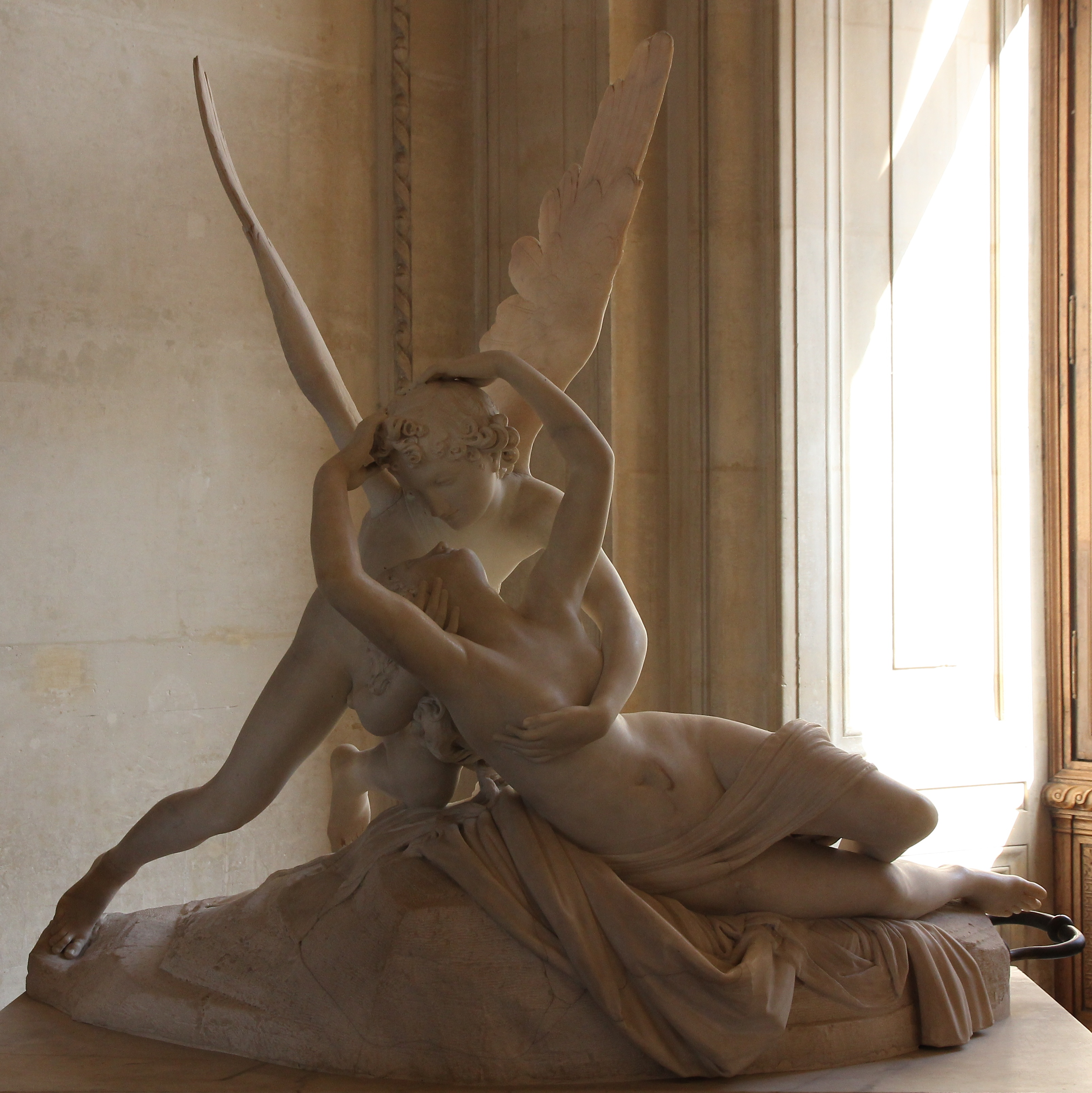
Psyche Revived by Cupid's Kiss, 1787–1793, Louvre

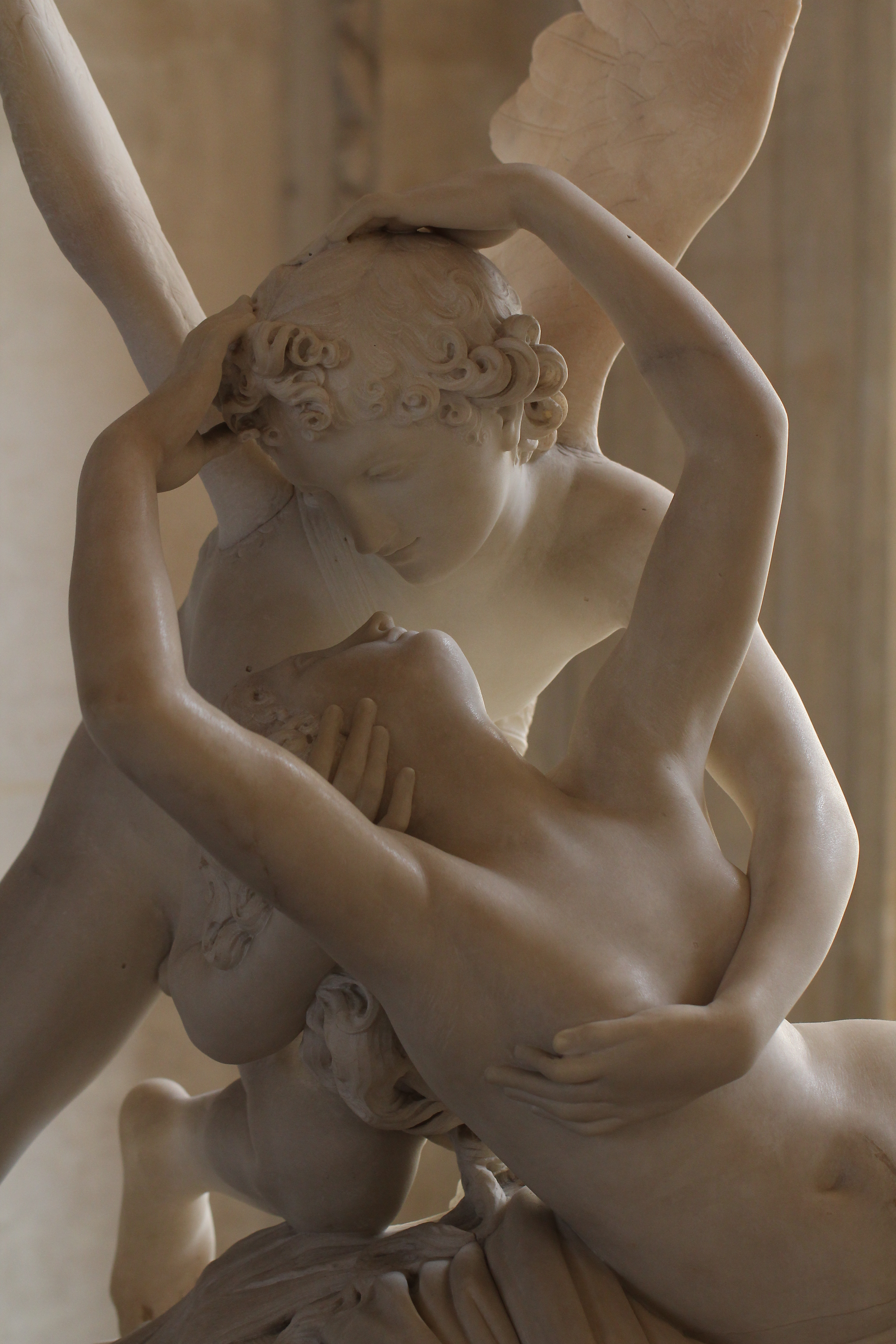
Psyche Revived by Cupid's Kiss, 1787–1793, Louvre (detail)

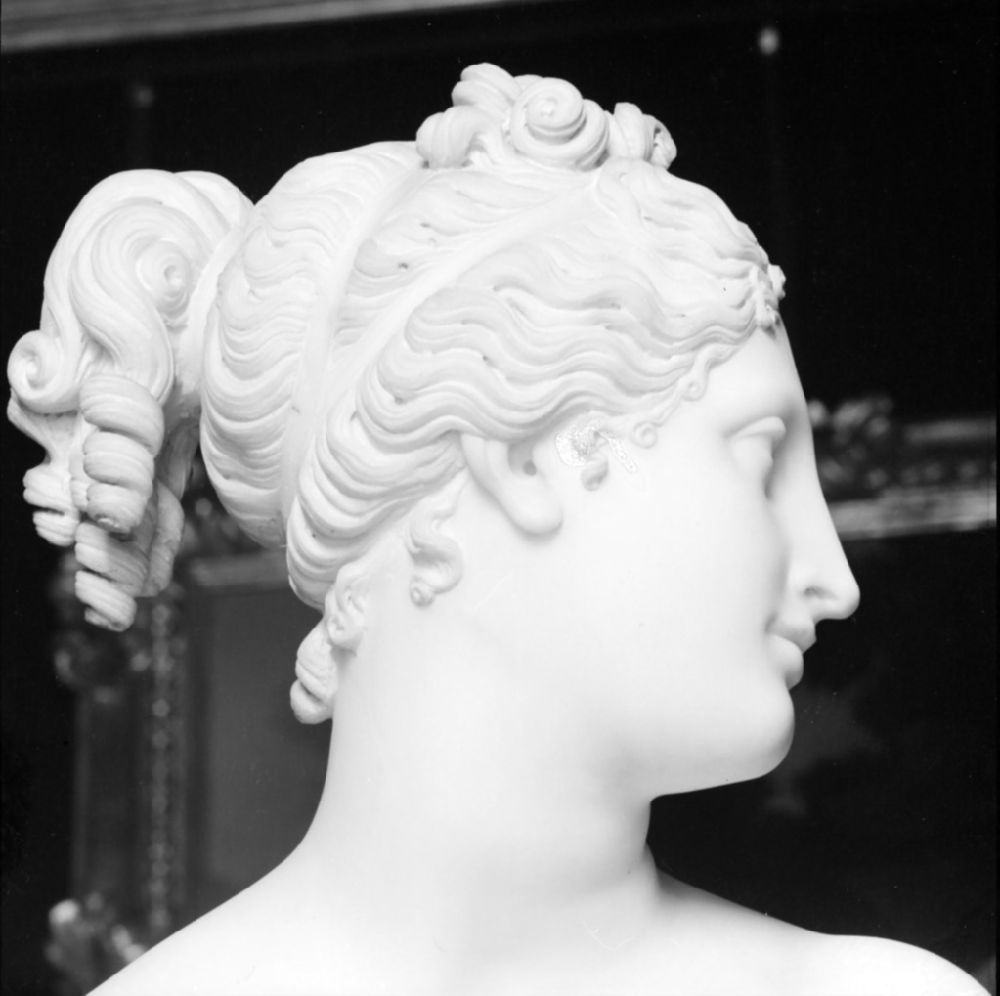
Antonio Canova, Detail of Venus Italica, 1804–1812, Galleria Palatina, Florence

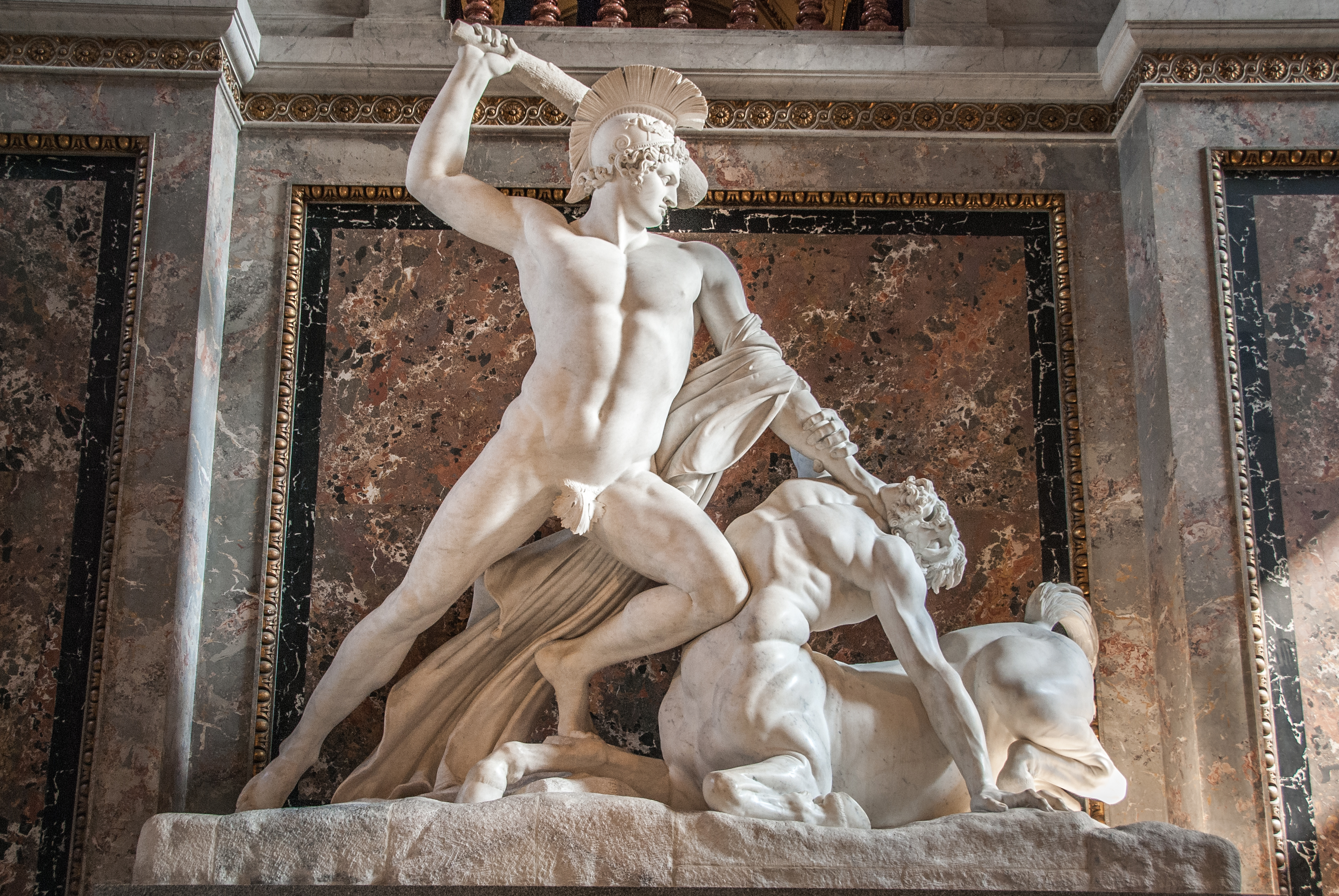
Theseus Fighting the Centaur (1804–1819), Kunsthistorisches Museum, Vienna (Note: Napoleon ordered it for the Corso in Milan; Emperor Franz I bought it for the Theseus Temple in the Volksgarten in Vienna; moved to Kunsthistorisches Museum in 1891.)

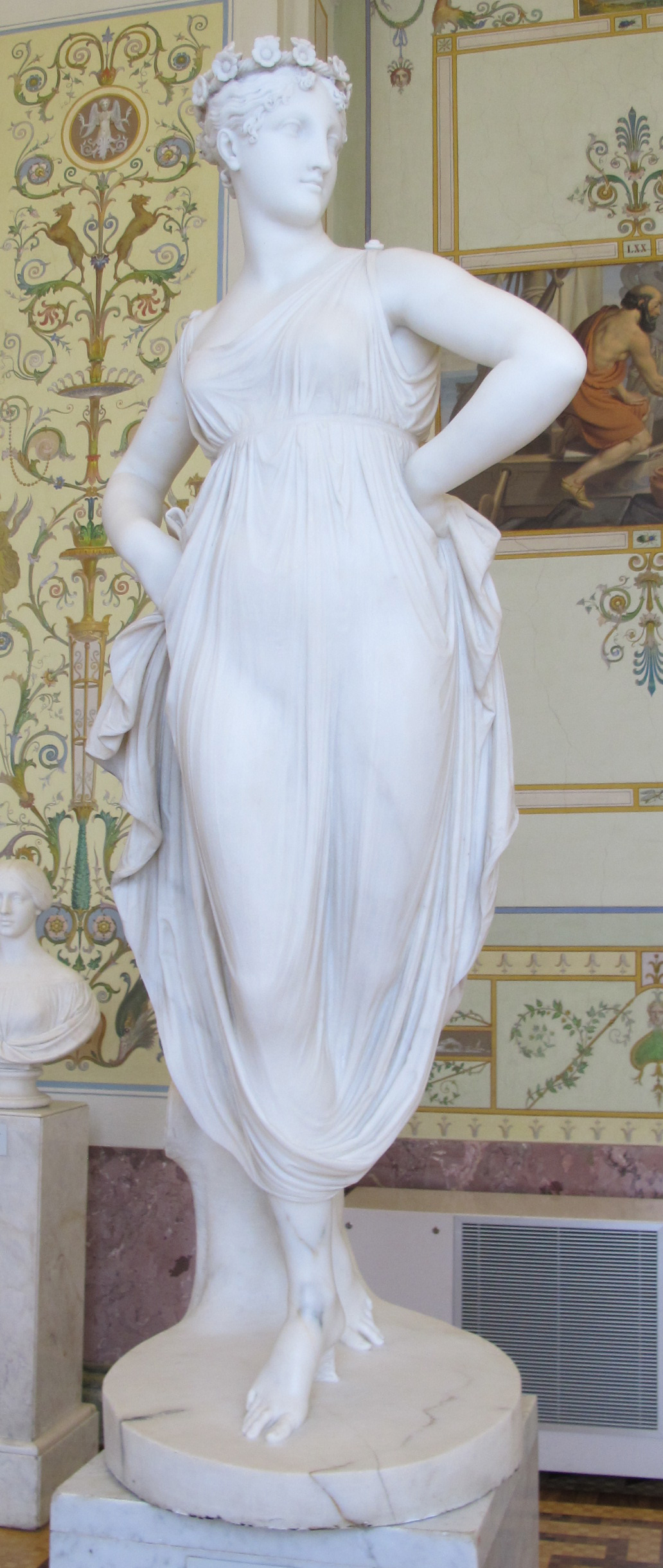
Dancer, 1811–1812, The State Hermitage Museum

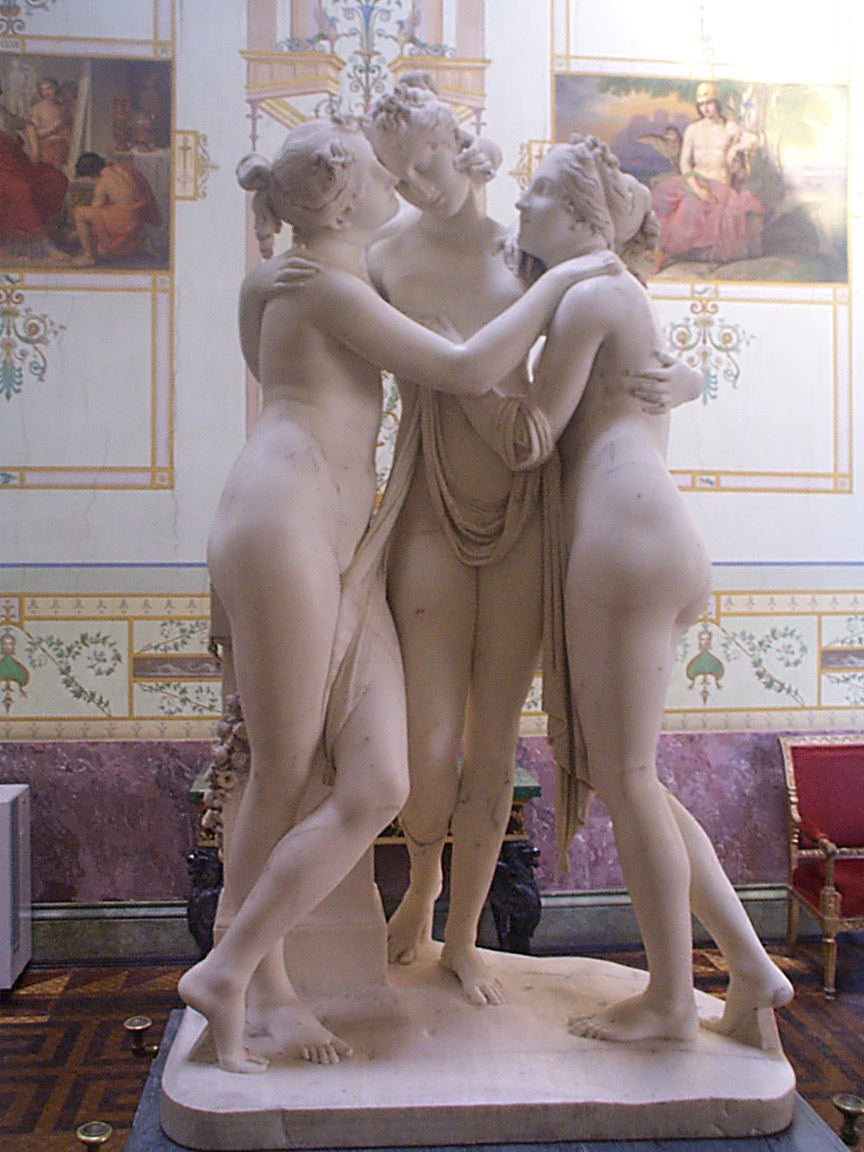
The Three Graces, 1814–1817, Hermitage

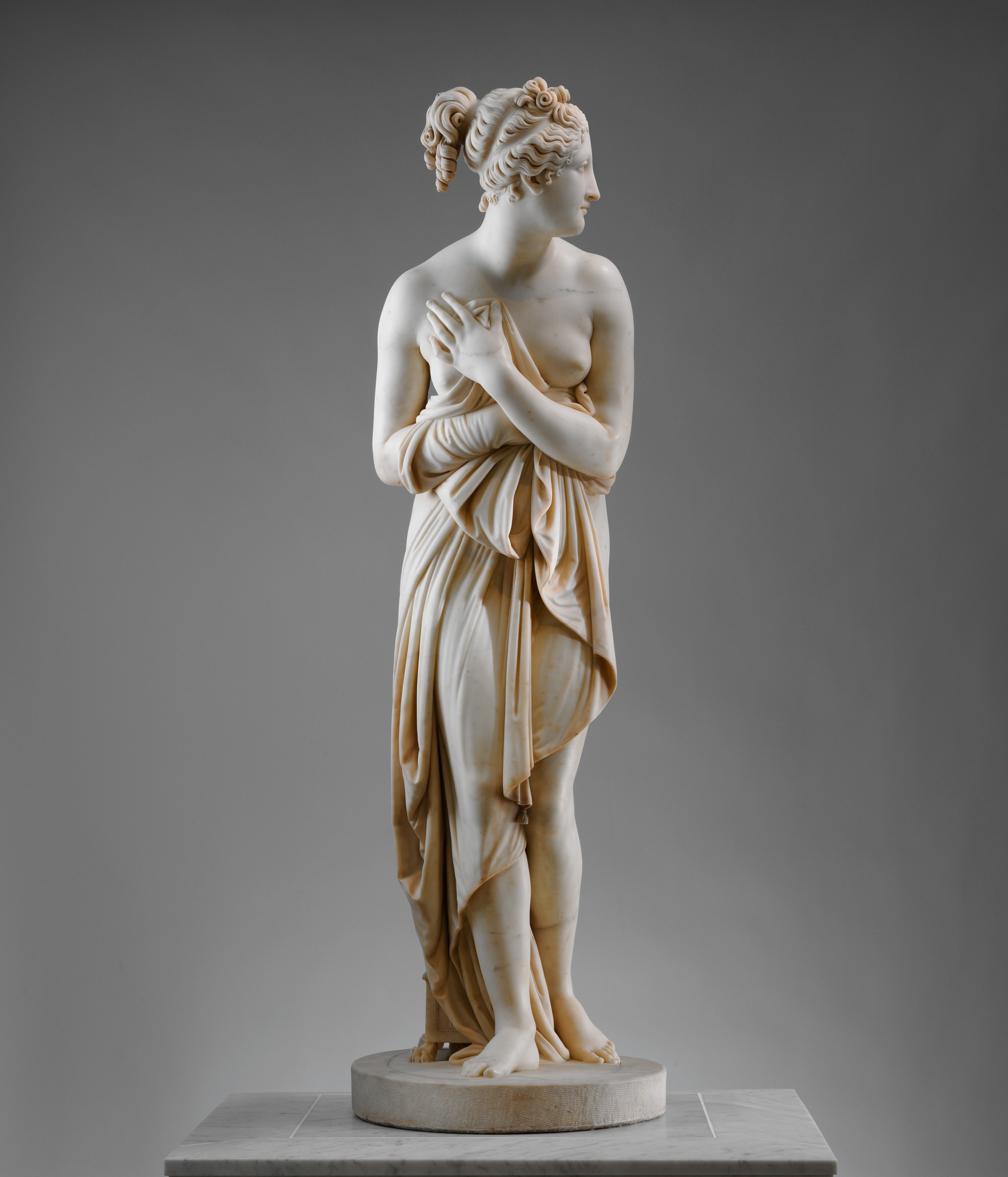
Venus Italica, c. 1822–23, Metropolitan Museum of Art

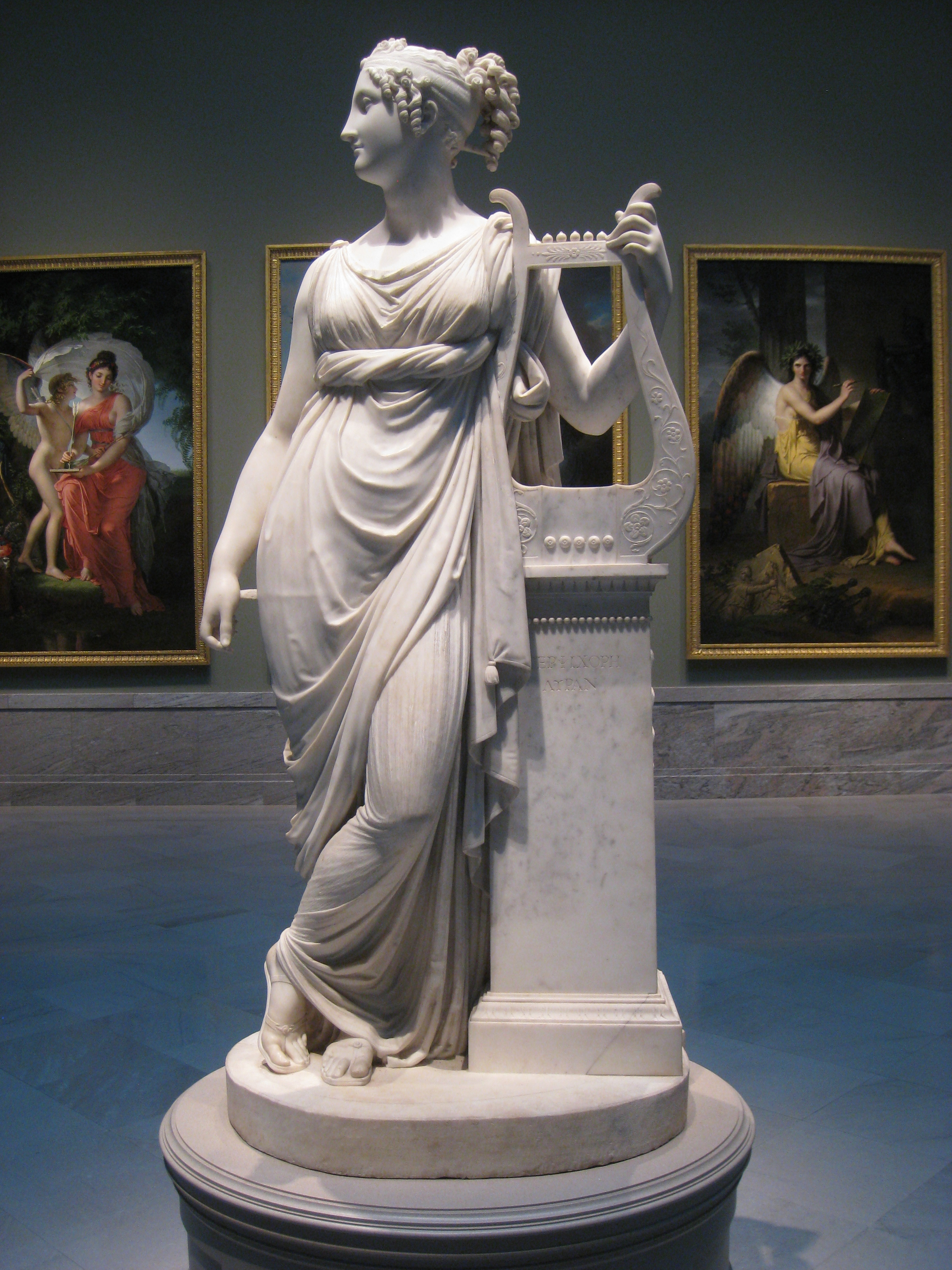
Terpsichore Lyran (Muse of Lyric Poetry)

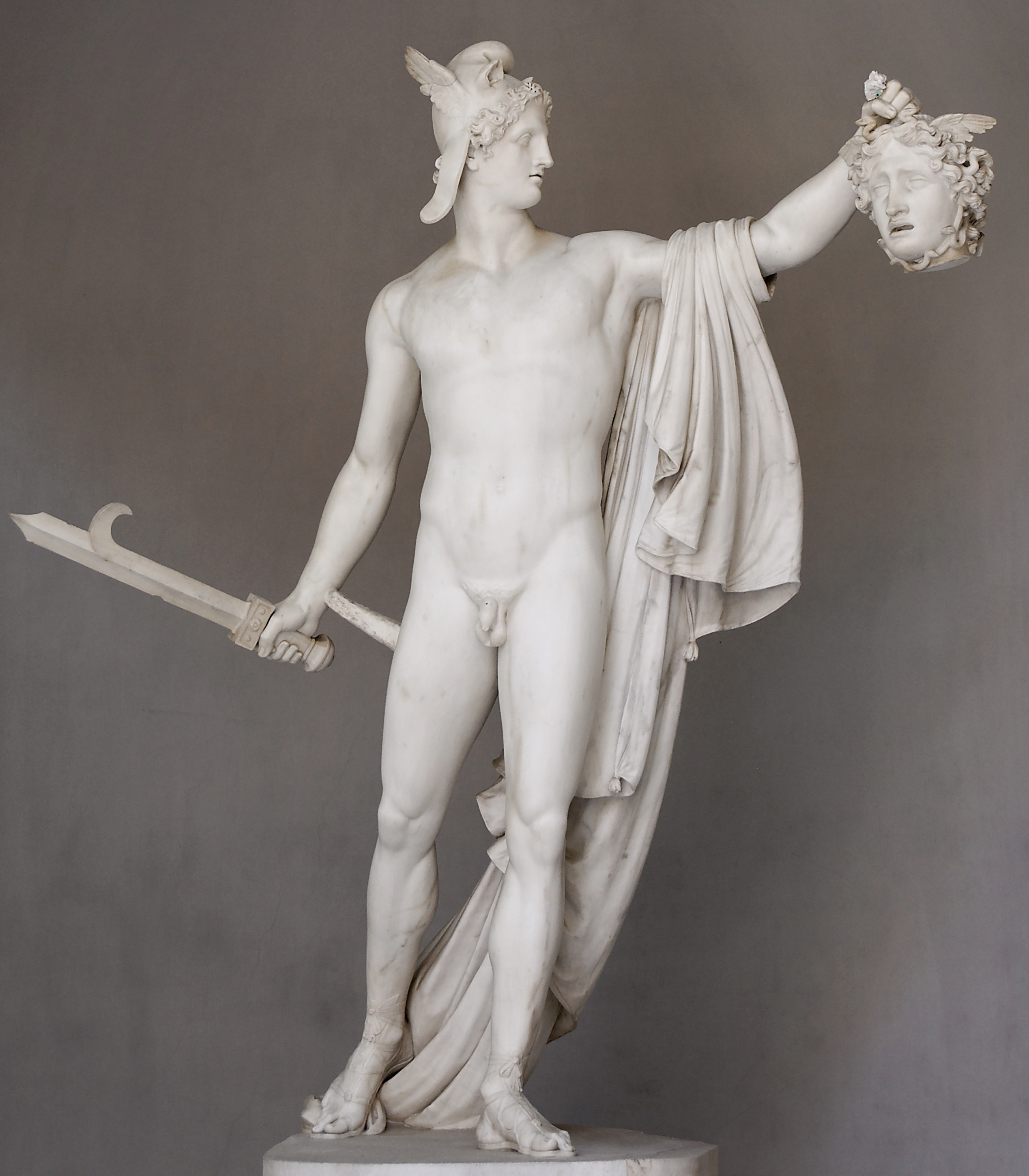
Perseus Triumphant, Vatican

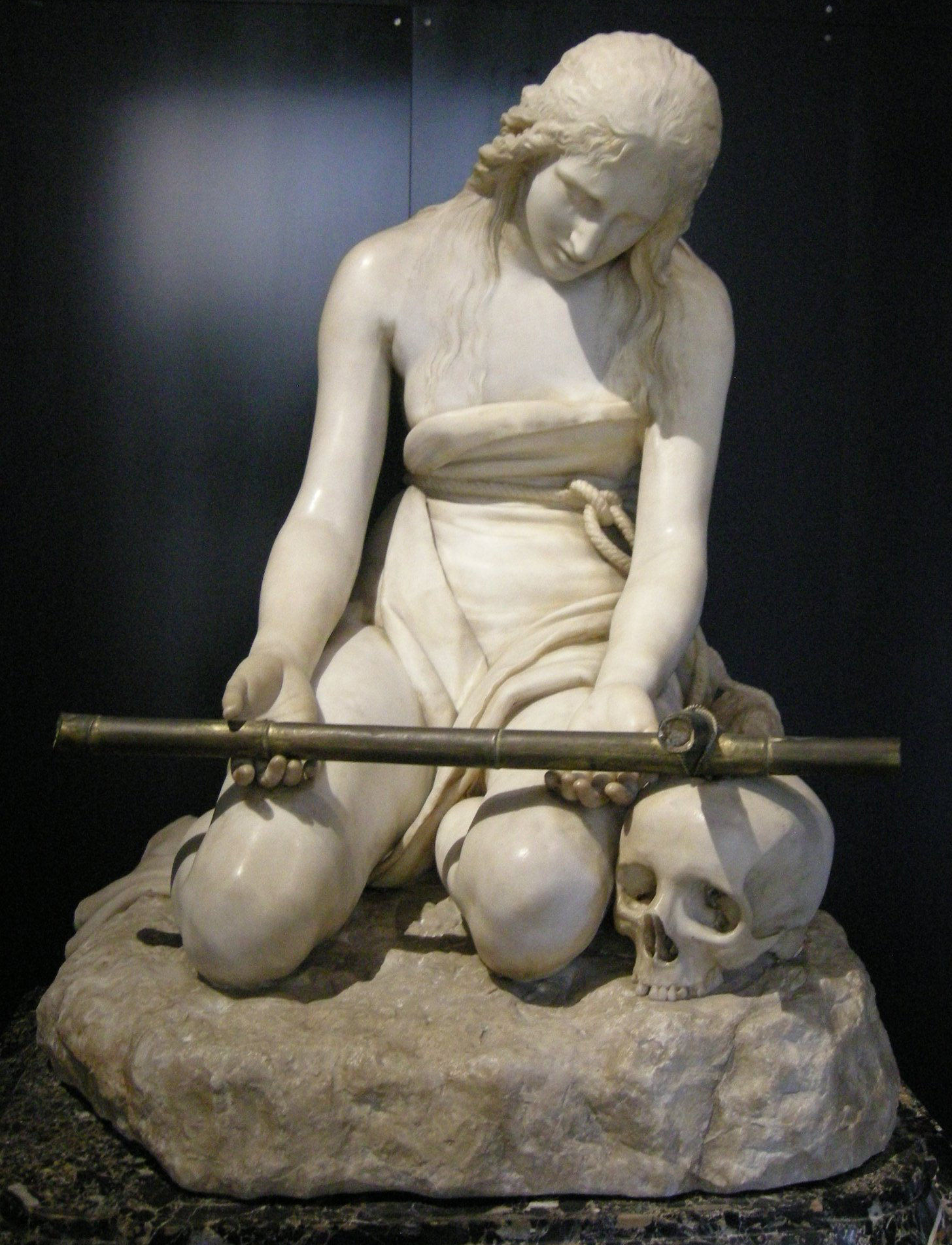
The Penitent Magdalene, Palazzo Doria-Tursi, Genoa

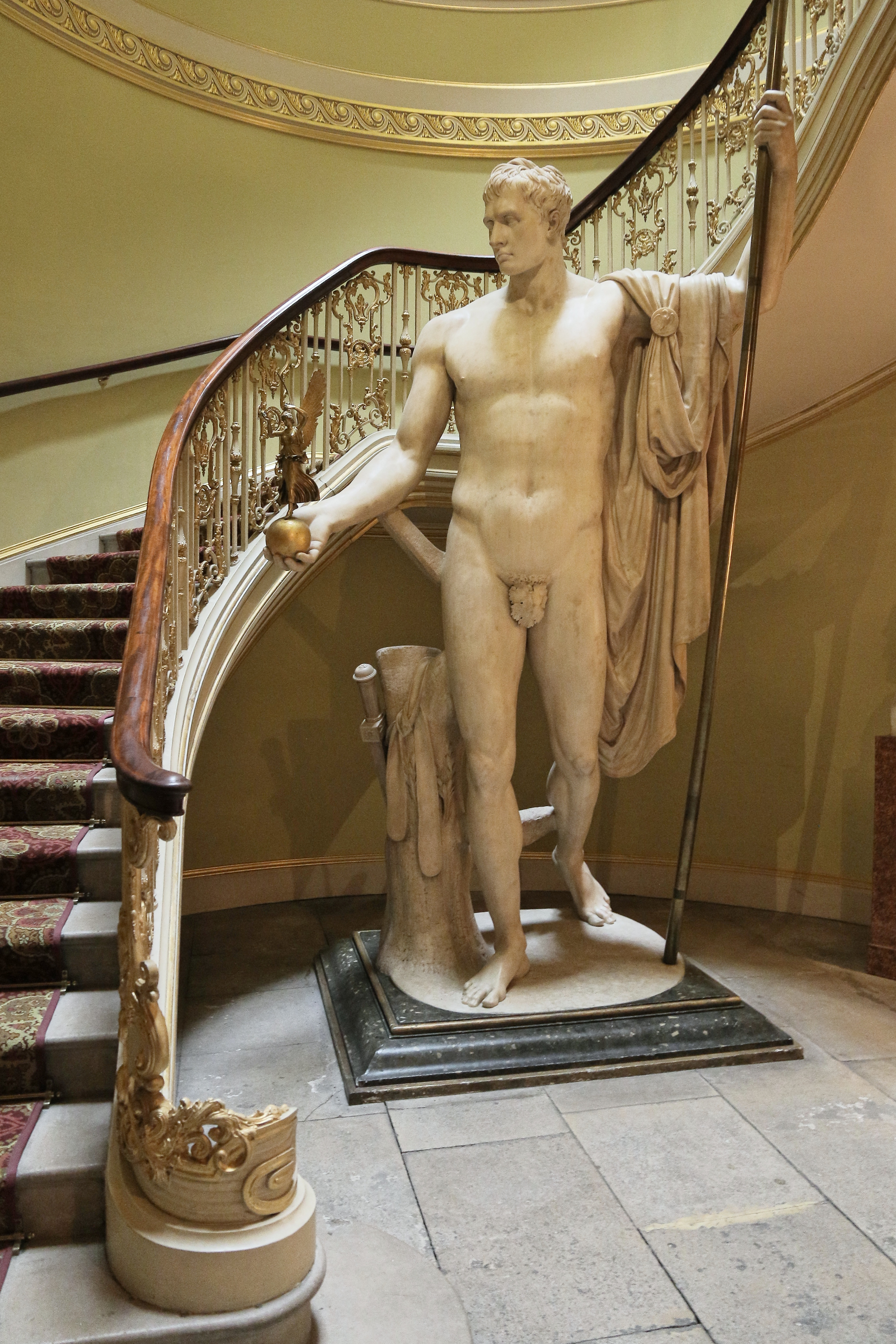
Napoleon as Mars the Peacemaker, Apsley House, London

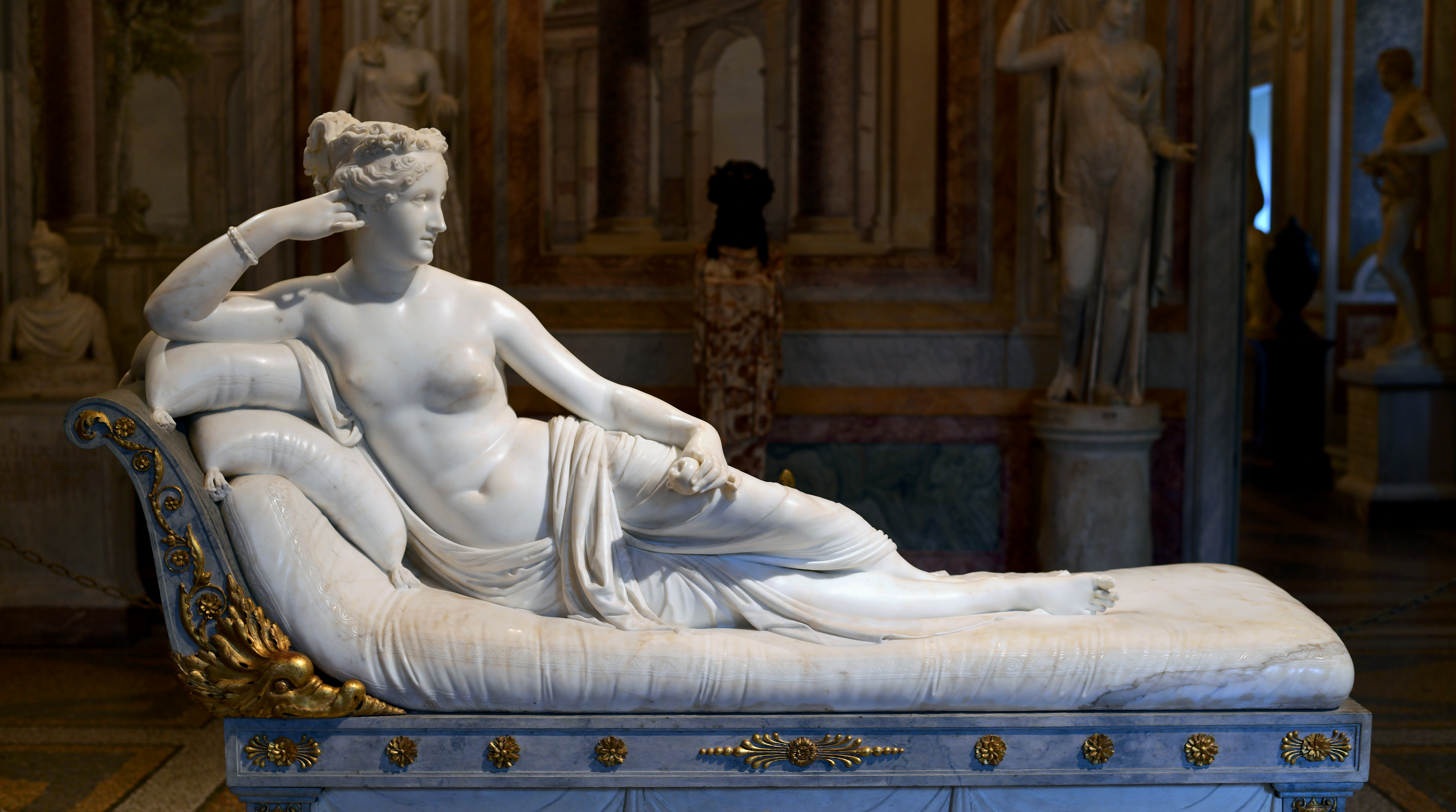
Pauline Bonaparte as Venus Victrix, now at the Galleria Borghese

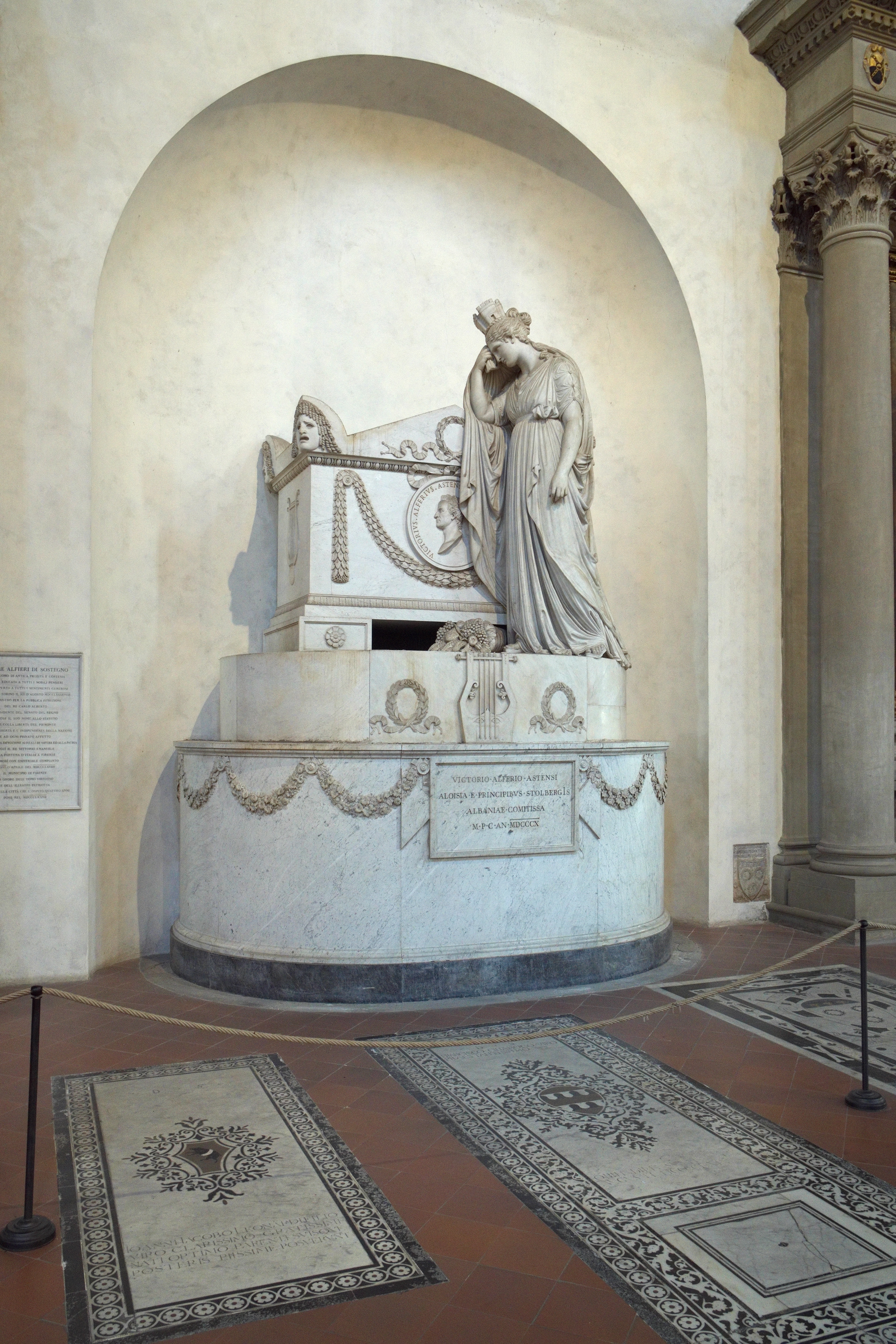
Monumental tomb of Vittorio Alfieri, Santa Croce, Florence, 1810

Monument to Pius VI

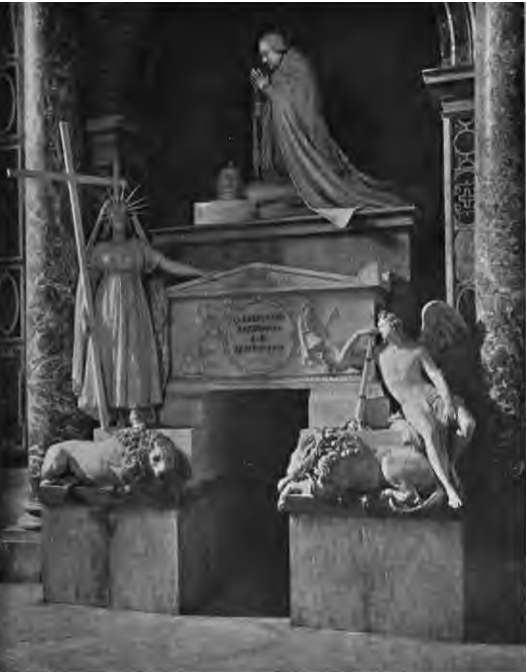
Tomb of Clement XIII

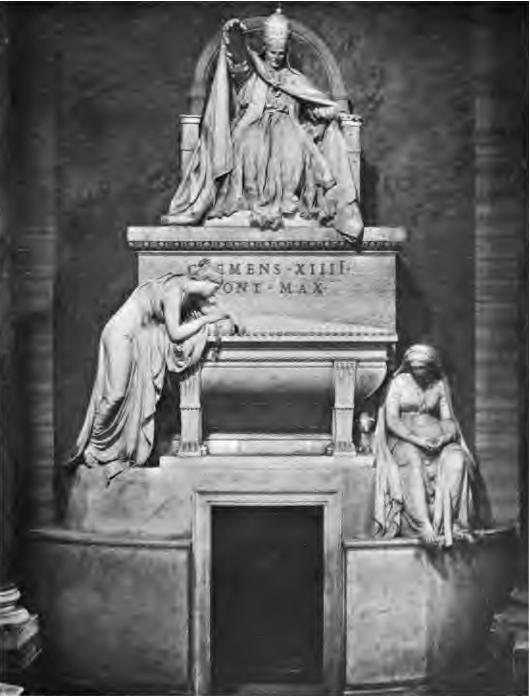
Tomb of Pope Clement XIV

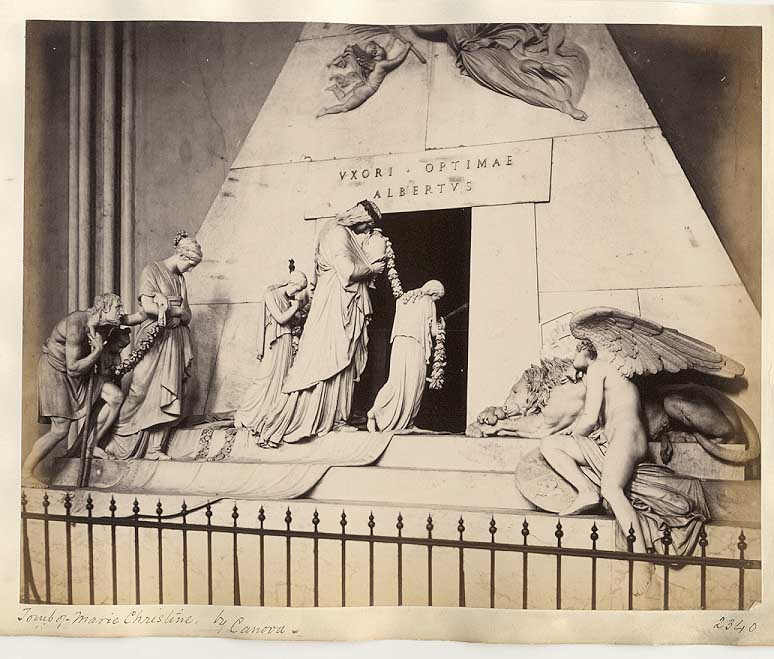
Cenotaph to Maria Christina of Austria in the Augustinerkirche

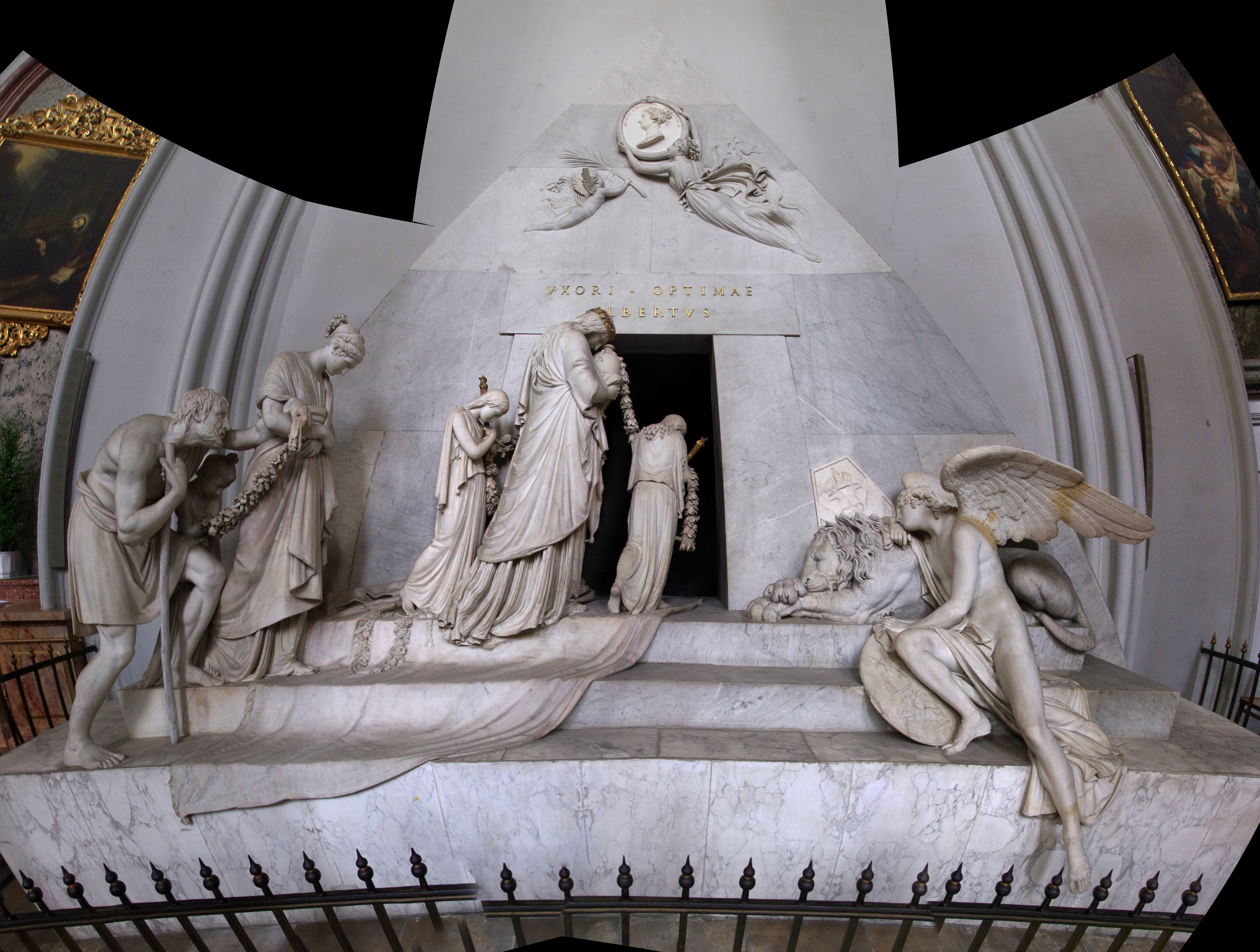
Panorama of Cenotaph to Maria Christina of Austria

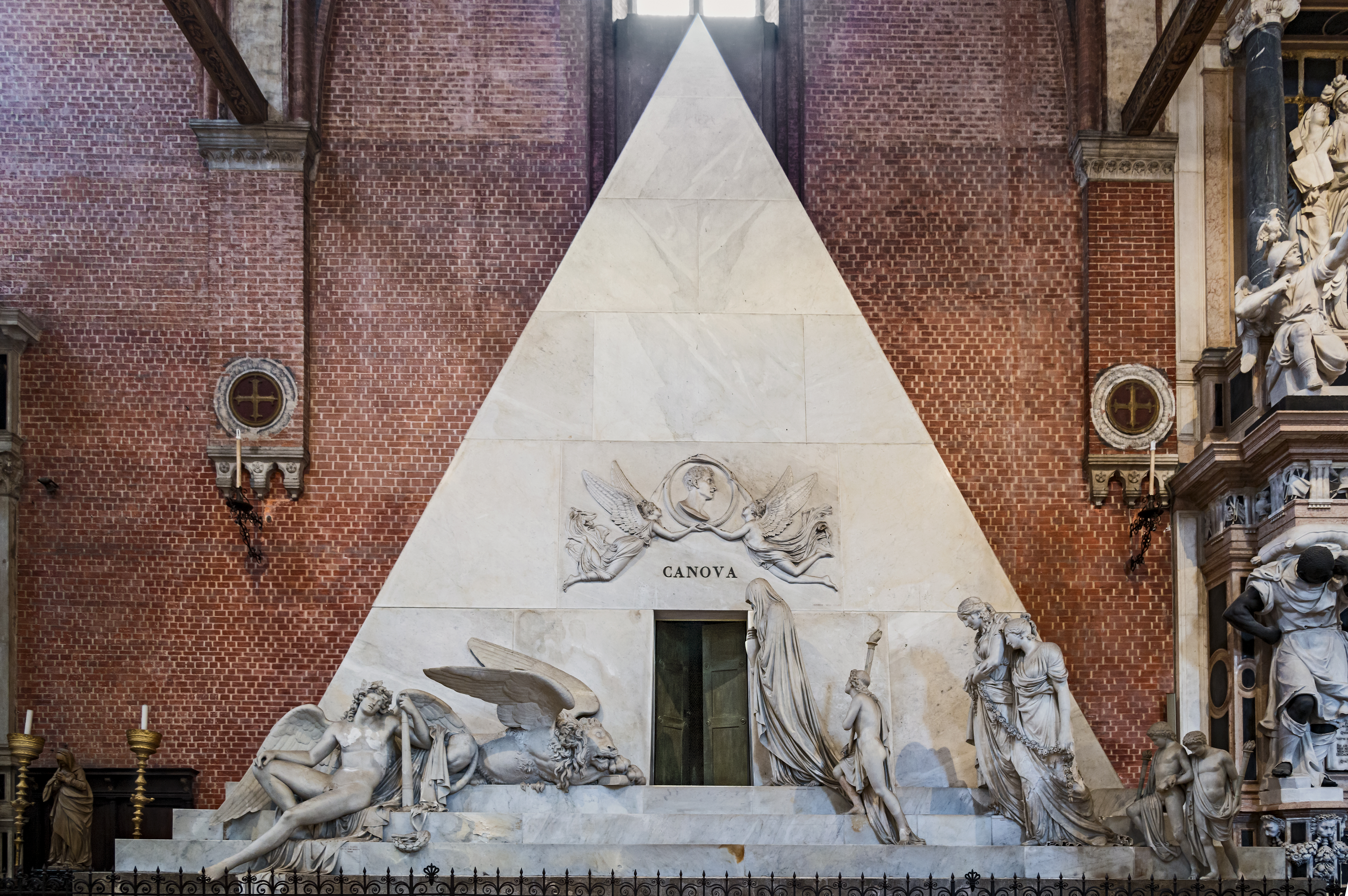
Monument to Canova in the Basilica di Santa Maria Gloriosa dei Frari, designed by Canova as a mausoleum for the painter Titian

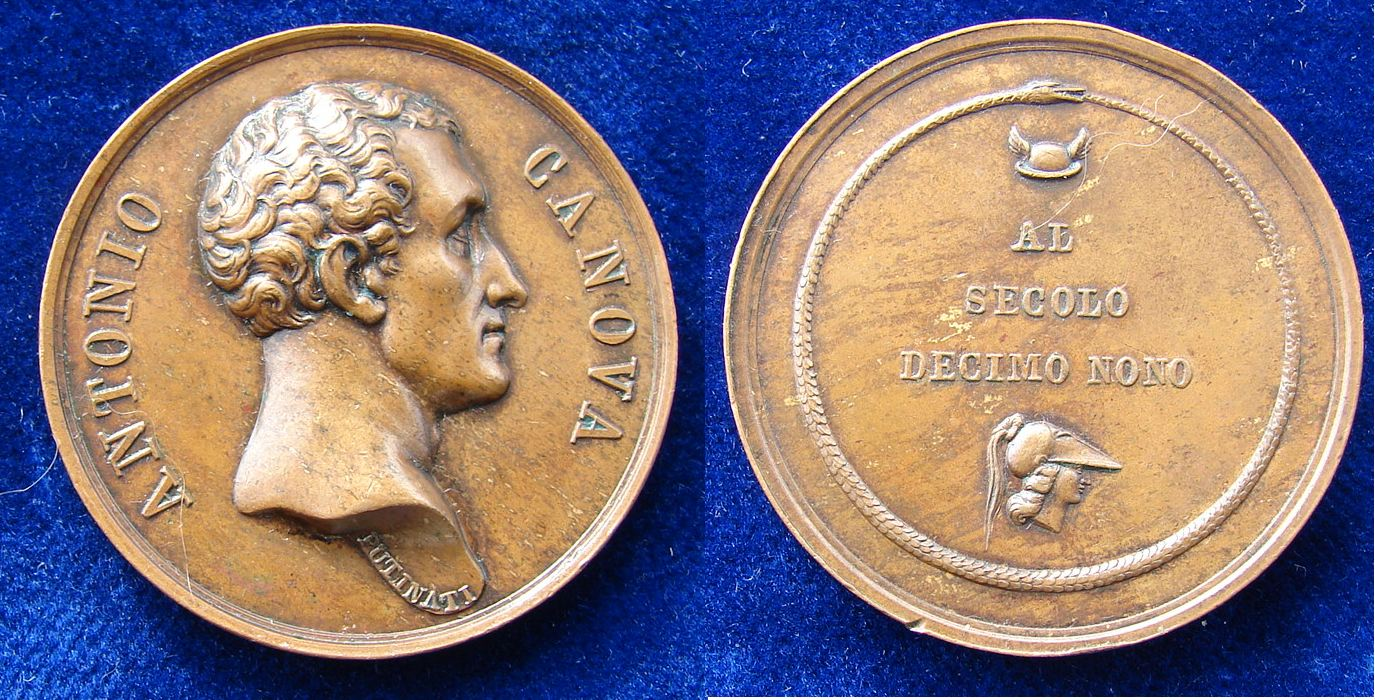
Antonio Canova medal by Putinati

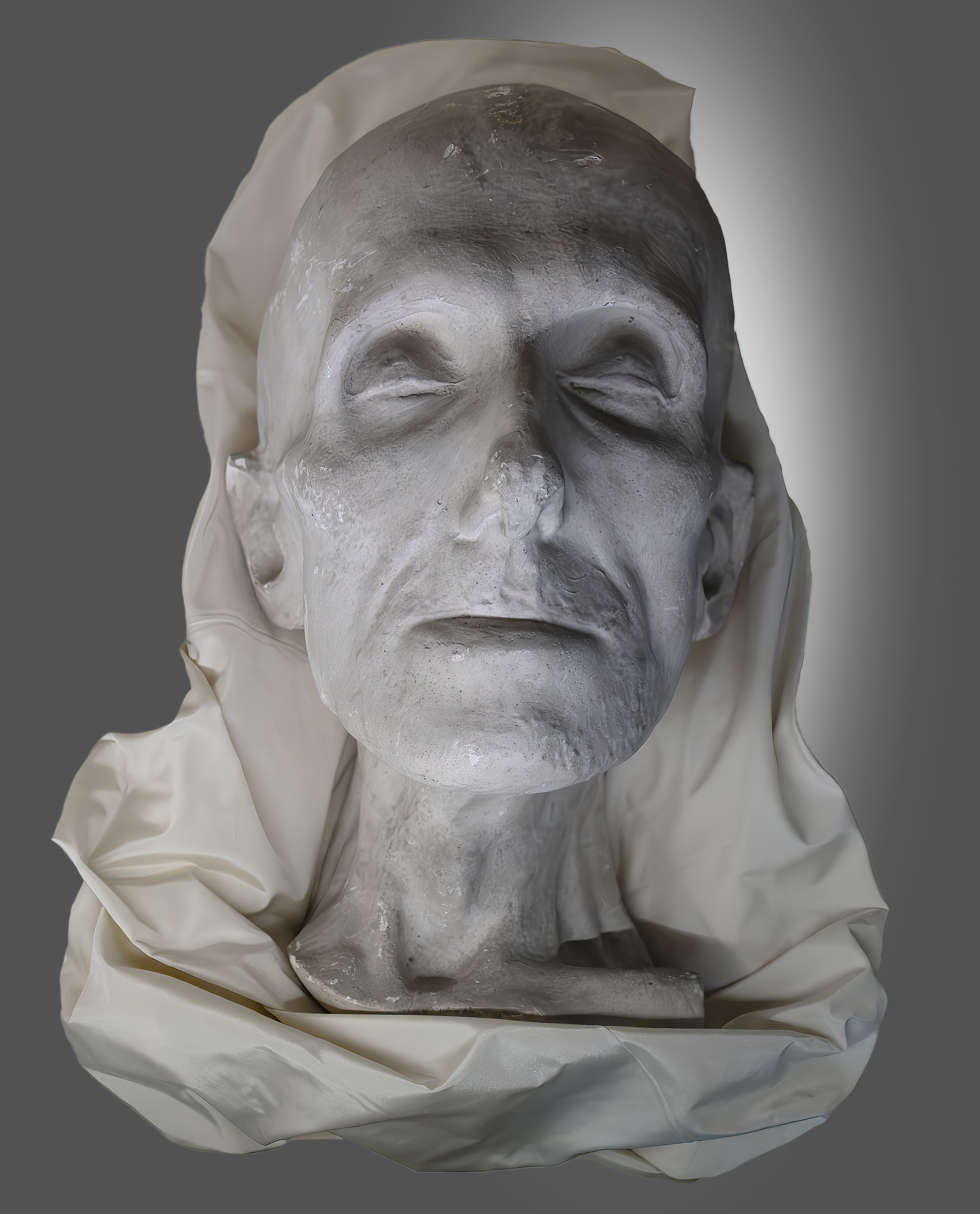
Antonio Canova's funeral mask, Museo Correr

== Sources ==
- Handley, Marie Louise Adelaide (1908), "Antonio Canova" , in Herbermann, Charles (ed.), Catholic Encyclopedia, vol. 3, New York: Robert Appleton Company
- This article incorporates text from a publication now in the public domain: Rossetti, William Michael (1911), "Canova, Antonio", in Chisholm, Hugh (ed.), Encyclopædia Britannica, vol. 5 (11th ed.), Cambridge University Press, pp. 204–206
- Turner, Jane, ed. (1996a), "Neo-Classical", The Dictionary of Art, Vol. XXII, New York: Grove's Dictionaries.
- Turner, Jane, ed. (1996b), "Antonio Canova", The Dictionary of Art, Vol. XXII, New York: Grove's Dictionaries.
