= Sartori of Vicenza =

Italian noble family

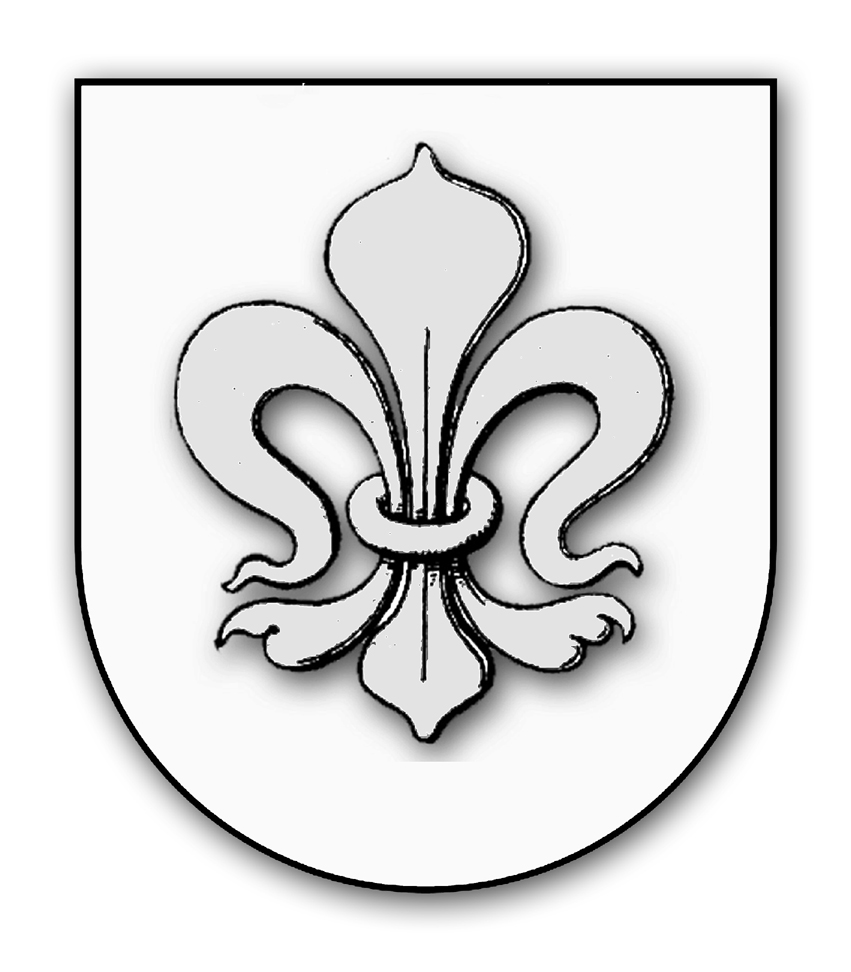
Presumed primitive form of the family coat of arms, engraved on the facade of a villa they owned in Roana. The villa was destroyed in World War I and the remaining description of the coat of arms is unclear. Its colors have not been described either. The lily, a traditional symbol of Florence, is probably a reference to their Florentine origins.

Sartori is an ancient noble family of Italy. It was founded in 1295 in Vicenza, where they were feudatories attached to the episcopal vassalage. Before 1500, they were admitted to the civic patriciate. The family made their fortune mainly in the logging and timber trade, accumulating a huge financial and land holdings. From the 16th century on, they established their main headquarters in Bassano del Grappa, and launched other branches to other cities in Veneto, Trentino, Austria, and Brazil. The family is very prolific and branched, producing several outstanding members. The different branches of the family held many titles: they were feudal lords in Roana, Foza, Castegnero and Meledo Alto; nobles in Vicenza, Roana, Bassano del Grappa, Belluno and Primiero; patricians in Vicenza, Roana, Asiago, Lusiana, Foza, Asolo, Valstagna, Longarone and Bassano del Grappa. The surname can be spelled as Sartore, Sartor, or Sartorio.

== Origin and overview ==
The Sartori descend from Florentines who arrived in Vicenza along with Bishop Andrea dei Mozzi, a member of one of the most illustrious families of Florentine magnates in the Middle Ages who was transferred to Vicenza after being involved in a major scandal, whose nature is still poorly understood. Anyhow, he arrived in Vicenza in late 1295, but he was already ill and died in less than a year, probably in August 1296.

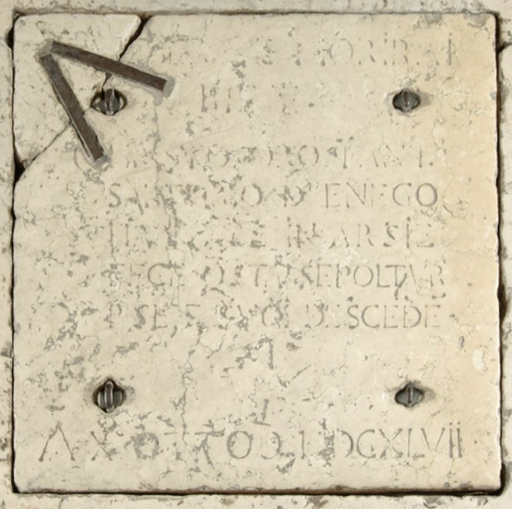
Tombstone of Antonio Sartori de Enego, buried in Arsiè in 1647.

Before Andrea died, he distributed fiefs among some of his servants, including members of a family whose original surname is unknown, and who came to adopt the surname Sartori in Vicenza. The Sartori received fiefs in Roana, one of the Seven Communes situated on the Vicentine plateau that constituted a semi-independent federation that, although it was subject to the ecclesiastical jurisdiction of the Diocese of Vicenza and the civil administration of Vicenza, maintained a delegate in Asiago, the capital of the Federation. At the same time, the bishop enrolled them as vassals of the Episcopal Table, naturalizing them as Vincentian nobles, remaining under successive bishops. Abbot Modesto Bonato, historian of the Seven Communes, said that he found in the public records only a single tradition about the Vincentian Sartori that referred to a Florentine origin with initial settlement in Roana.

The names of the founders of the family are unknown. After the death of Bishop Mozzi, the family concentrated around his fief. Armed with a well-established social and economic base, the new Sartori prospered by acquiring new fiefdoms and vast areas of land on the Vincentian plateau around Roana, establishing new settlements successively in Enego, Foza, Gallio, Asiago, Lusiana and Valstagna, and later, down the valley of the Brenta River, where they established kinship ties with the principal families of the region. From the 15th century on, they are again present in the Vincentian urban headquarters, where they join the patriciate and some characters stand out; afterwards, they spread to many other communes in Veneto, being generally welcomed in the local patriciate. By the 16th century, the family had split into multiple branches and several of them had acquired great wealth, especially through logging and trading.

However, by the mid-16th century, discussions were already beginning in Vicenza to exclude all those who practiced mechanical trades, such as commerce, from the civic nobility, restricting noble status only to the families participating in the council and to practitioners of a few particularly prestigious trades considered noble. This process culminated with the enactment of an act, in 1632, that reformed the entire ruling class and effectively restricted the conferral of nobility as had been proposed. From then on, merchants like the Sartori could keep their nobility as long as they obtained a special dispensation, but there is no sign that they made that request. From the end of the 18th century, the Vicenza group goes into decay, accentuated in the tumultuous and long period of the Napoleonic invasion and the wars of Italian unification in the 19th century, when the city was severely damaged. However, branches of other cities remained noble until the 19th century.

The history of the Sartori in Vicenza is poorly reconstructed due to a massive loss of documents from public and private archives during the Unification wars in the 19th century and World War II, and documents prior to 1501 are scarce, as the entire Council archive was lost in a fire.

== Vicenza ==
=== Context ===
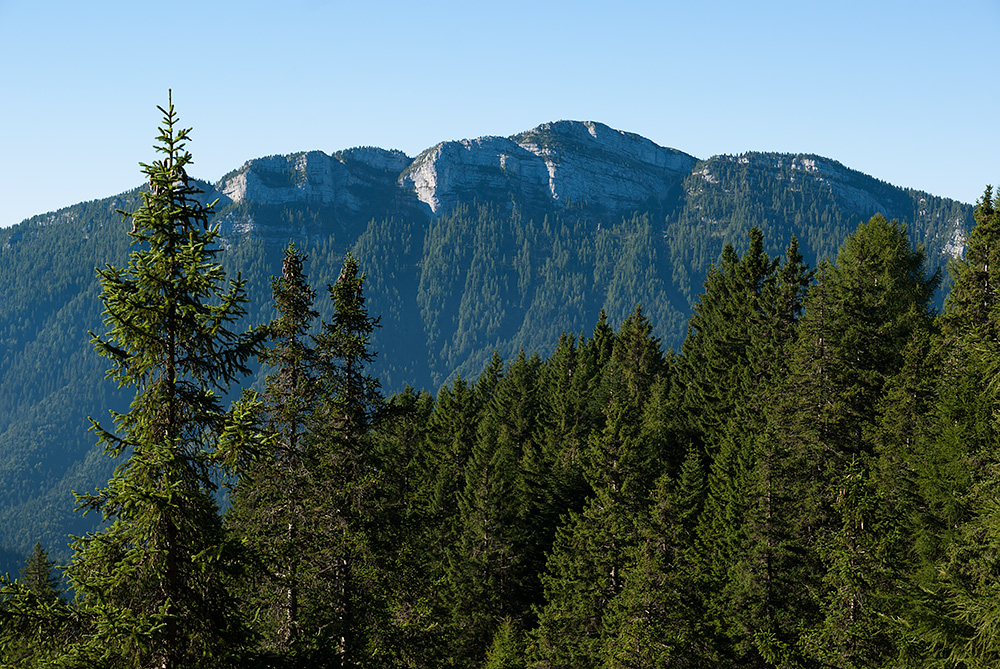
Mount Verena in Roana, former fiefdom of the Sartori.

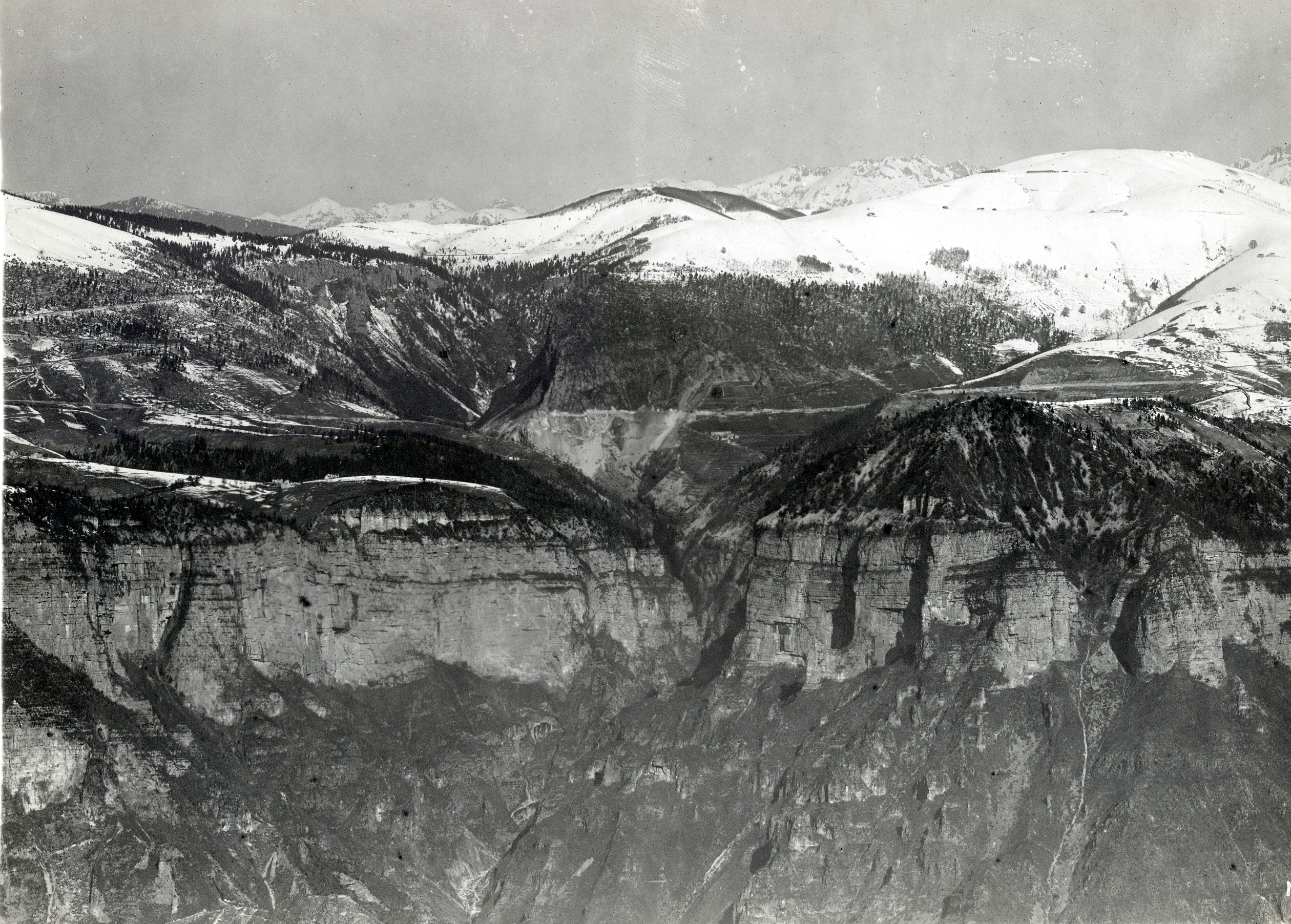
Mount Sasso Rosso in Foza, former Sartori fiefdom.

Since the 9th century, the bishops had ruled the city as an episcopal fief, despite it being nominally a secular county. When the Sartori arrived, the power of the bishops was declining, and the political system, through pressure from the emerging bourgeoisie supported by the party of the counts of Vicenza, was being rearticulated in a more democratic way, in the so-called "communal phase". The conflict between the bishops and the counts was endemic, but by the 13th century, the popular party had a clear advantage, accentuated by a series of incompetent or corrupt episcopal administrators. In this period of crisis, one of the strategies adopted by the bishops was to persuade supporters by granting fiefdoms and privileges, which did not always work out as intended; many benefited families started pursuing their own interests and vying for power.

During the Middle Ages, the right to undertake enterprise, to participate in guilds and brotherhoods, to have access to justice, and to vote in the Council relied on the formal possession of the status of citizen. Anyone who was not a citizen remained on the margins of society. Naturally, over time, the citizen class underwent social stratification, forming a bourgeois patriciate enriched in commerce, manufacturing, and financial activity, which consolidated itself as the ruling class by monopolizing the main public offices. Citizenship was usually passed on hereditarily, but outsiders could acquire it by fulfilling certain conditions, including the payment of a fee, being resident in the city for some years, and having certain assets. The conditions varied from place to place and over time. In medieval Vicenza, citizenship was obtained with some ease, requiring only fixed residence in the city for ten years and the payment of the usual taxes.

These conditions, however, became more restrictive, and by the 15th century, it was necessary to be wealthy to obtain citizenship. In parallel, as the patrician bourgeoisie became politically and economically empowered, they began to claim recognition as noblemen, a demand reinforced by the performance of trades that, since the Middle Ages, had been considered noble, such as those of physician, diplomat, judge, jurisconsult, and notary. In 1430, merchant citizens also came to be considered noble by virtue of the notable public utility of their activities, and by the 16th century, citizenship in general was a status that conferred a clear aristocratic quality, only being granted to wealthy and notable families, a practice that had become common throughout northern Italy. The dignity of the citizens was positively enhanced by their participation in municipal administrative activities, and in particular in the council, an even more exclusive board, whose noble character was also recognized by the Republic of Venice, which had taken control of the city since 1404.

=== Characters ===
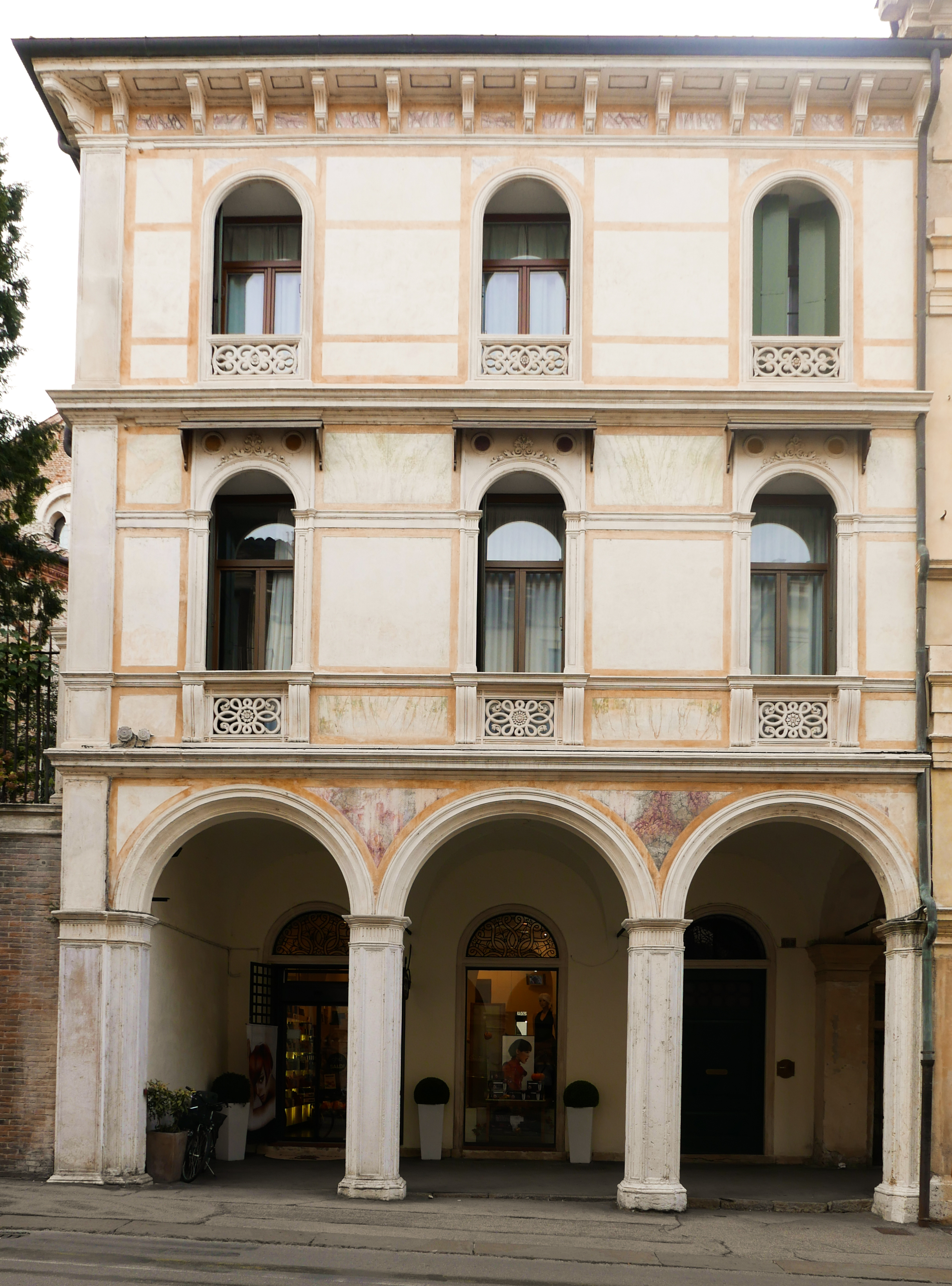
House that belonged to Beltrame Sartori in the 15th century. Its current appearance is no longer the original, having been renovated in the 19th century.

After their brief appearance in the time of Bishop Mozzi, the Sartori begin to make their presence felt in the city of Vicenza in the 15th century. Several characters can be cited. Venceslao was a preacher in 1431; Beltrame, in 1470, was authorized to rebuild the wall of the garden of the Church of Saint Corona, because it served as a support for one of the walls of his house; about this time, Bertoldo lived in Castegna, an obscure locality, probably Castegnero, 11 km. south of Vicenza, also spelled in ancient sources as Castegnerio, Castelnero or Castelniero, which would shortly thereafter be securely associated with the Valstagna/Vicenza branch. Bernardino, Gregorio's son, was attested in Vicenza in 1520 as a witness in a will; the notary Giovanni Giacomo Antonio, attested from 1537, made a will in 1560 leaving a bequest for the construction of a monumental sepulchre for himself and his sons Sebastiano, Bernardino and Flaminio in the New Church of Saint Blaise; the vir egregius (outstanding man) Vincenzo, a Vincentian nobleman, was cited in 1564 in Valdagno, and his son Girolamo resided in Magrè (Schio).

At this time, the family of Nicolò, descendant of a group established in Foza and Asiago and later in Valstagna, settles in the city, and obtained citizenship of Vicenza on July 27, 1581. At this time, his family, according to Sebastiano Rumor, was also known with the surname De Sartoris, accompanied by the toponym of Castegnerio. Shortly thereafter, a member of the family would be invested with a fief in Castegnero.

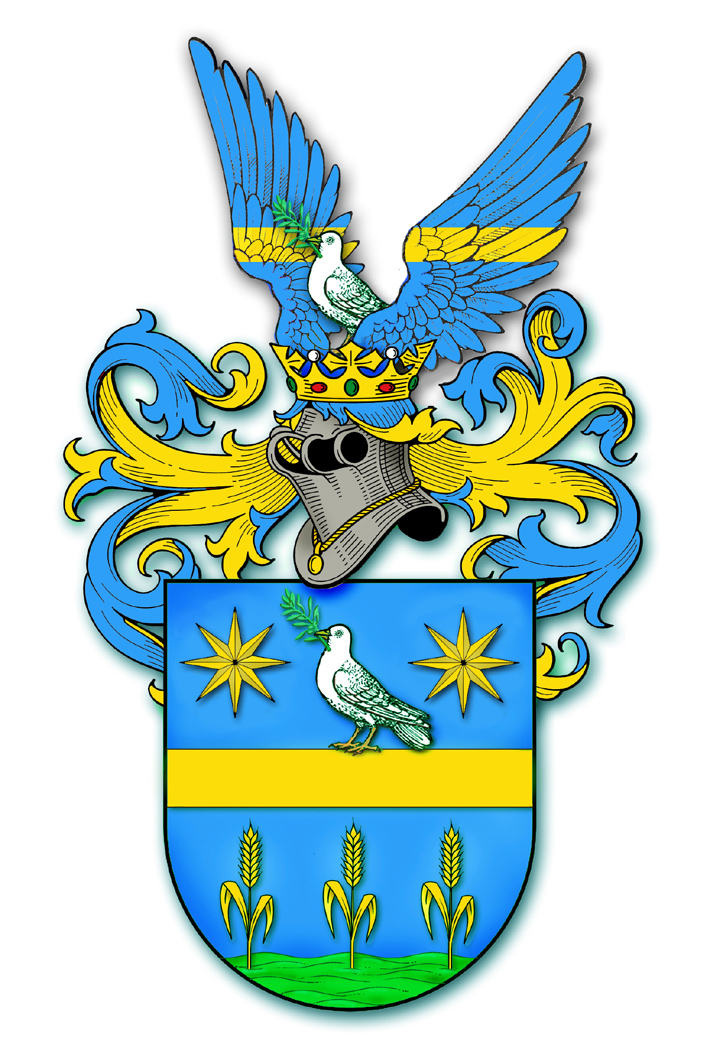
Coat of arms of Nicolò de Valstagna's branch, attested in 1581 in the document of his admission to the class of citizens of Vicenza.

Nicolò held the title of dominus and was one of the richest merchants in the region. Corazzol said that his family was very rich, with a capital that reached tens of thousands of ducats, an immense fortune at the time. According to Occhi, his family owned the Melette, Sasso Rosso and Fontanelle mountains in Foza, the Astiago and Vallerana mountain pastures in the Valstagna area, the Miela and Vanzo mountains in the Gallina area, and had been logging in Enego, Foza, Valstagna, Cinte Tesino, Scurelle and Primiero since the early 16th century. His estate also included other lands, goods and privileges in Borgo, Cinte Tesino, Pieve Tesino, Castel Tesino, Grigno, Primiero, Scurelle, Telve, Ancarano, Campolongo sul Brenta, Enego, Fonzaso, Gallio, Marostica, Oliero, Tezze sul Brenta and Vallonara. Nicolò's business was divided between trading in coal, wool, timber and land, as well as operating a banking house. He had palaces in Valstagna, Angarano, Vicenza, and Bassano del Grappa, was arbitrator of disputes in Foza, and receiver of Valstagna. He married Susanna Camoli, a member of a family of great timber merchants of Primolano, an association which brought him great commercial benefits, and left descendants in Vicenza, but late in life, he moved to Bassano, where he also obtained citizenship in 1592, and in 1599, was received into the council, dying after 1617. In that year, he left a bequest of £57 for the celebration of a daily mass and a De Profundis by the family grave in Bassano. His sons, Girolamo and Giulio, lived mainly in Bassano, while Sebastiano and Francesco made their wills in Vicenza respectively in 1624 and 1658.

Matteo Vieceli has made a pertinent analysis of the context in which these large logging families operated and explains why they dispersed over a large region in the Veneto. According to him, it was common for these families to set up their main bases in several strategic locations at the same time and personally supervise each one of them, which forced their members to reside in these locations, intending to control the entire production chain, "in a logic of vertical integration of the many moments of transformation and commercialization of the wood." This approach often led them to establish marriage ties with important local families, and typically, these marriages involved large financial and business interests on both sides. These merchant families "often contributed to replacing the patriciate of the cities and towns in which they settled, bringing relations, knowledge, but above all a more open mentality," and not infrequently excelled in artistic and cultural patronage and social beneficence. He adds:

Entering the commercial timber industry was very expensive: there were many barriers to entry, both in terms of financial and real estate capital. Investors had to advance substantial sums to obtain logging concessions (increasingly expensive over time), for logging permits, for customs fees, to hire agents who navigated both the Archdeacon territories and the Venetian bureaucracy, to pay lumberjacks, foremen, and boatmen. It was also necessary to build or rent greenhouses, sawmills, warehouses, and everything else that was necessary for the success of the trade. We must remember that the return given by the complete business cycle was often long term, on the order of fifteen to forty years. Merchants, therefore, often associated with each other and with Archdeaconian and Venetian subjects, sharing costs, as they intended to establish themselves in the market as global operators and not simply limit themselves in one geographical area or operating segment. Natural evolution was, therefore, the set of strategies designed to establish institutionalized kinship ties between families occupying strategic roles in the commercial network, such as engagements, arranged marriages (for dowry or with widows of wealthy merchants), and baptisms, especially from the mid-sixteenth century onward.

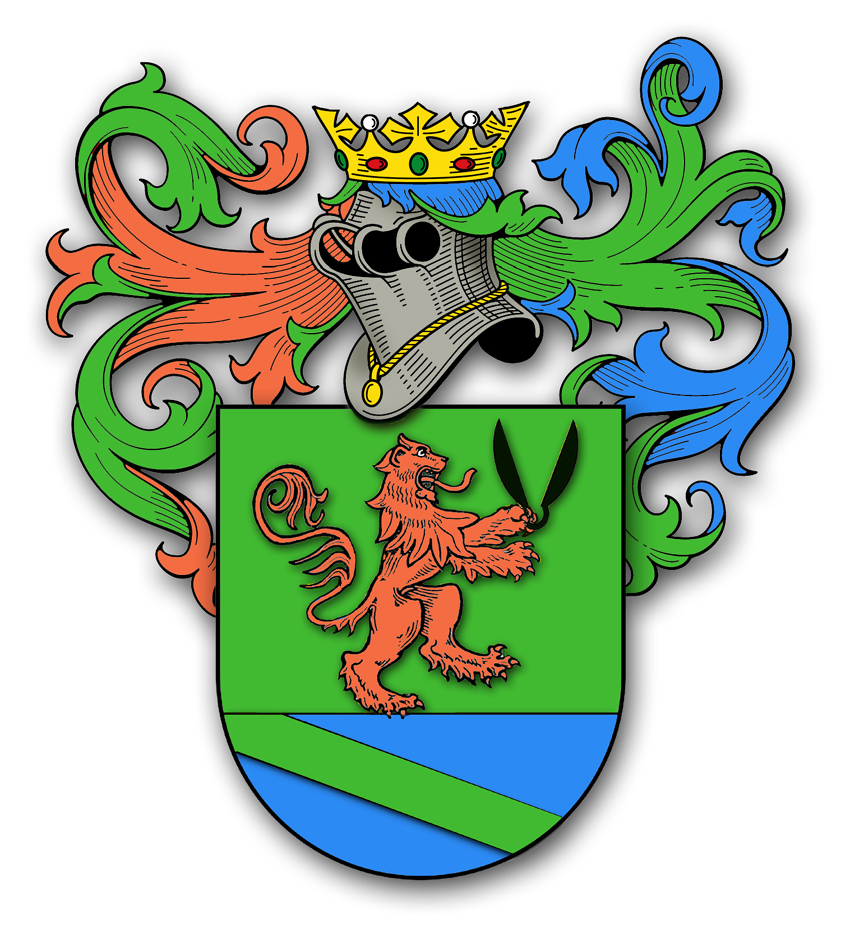
Coat of arms of Enego's group.

Another group, originally from Enego, obtained citizenship of Vicenza in 1582, and by 1599 they already had coats of arms. This group used at least two other variants of this coat of arms: one with the gold lion and the silver scissors, and another documented in Bassano del Grappa in 1615 at his tomb in the Church of Saint Francis, with the green lion, the gold upper field, the purple band and a red band between the two fields.

Paolo, born in Vicenza, a member of the Order of Saint Jerome, was received into the Sacred College of Theologians in Padua in 1602. In the early 17th century, Count Vincenzo Arnaldi invested Camillo Sartori, residing in the suburb of Creazzo, with the ancient fiefs of Castegnerio and Meledo Alto, together with the adjoining fields. In 1620, Joannis de Sartoriis of Castegnerio raised a tomb in the New Church of Saint Blaise of Vicenza for himself and his heirs, and Benedicto (Benedetto, Benetto) Sartori, a forensic notary, raised a tomb for himself and his heirs in the Church of St. Michael the Archangel in the same city, in 1630. Matheus was rector of the Church of San Martino in 1644; Giovanni, rector of the Church and of the Orphanotrophy of Mercy in 1653; Giulio and his brothers, sons of Nicolò, were active between Vicenza and Bassano in the mid-seventeenth century as great merchants; in 1678, Giovanni Martino of Vicenza was elected assessor of the Council of Treviso.

In the mid-17th century, the fiefs the family had all been sold, and by this time, the reform of the Vicenza patriciate excluded from the nobility the merchant families, the main source of income for the Sartori; as a result, the Vicenza group, despite losing its noble status, remained generally in good standing until the end of the 18th century, with several members cited with the honorific treatment of signor.

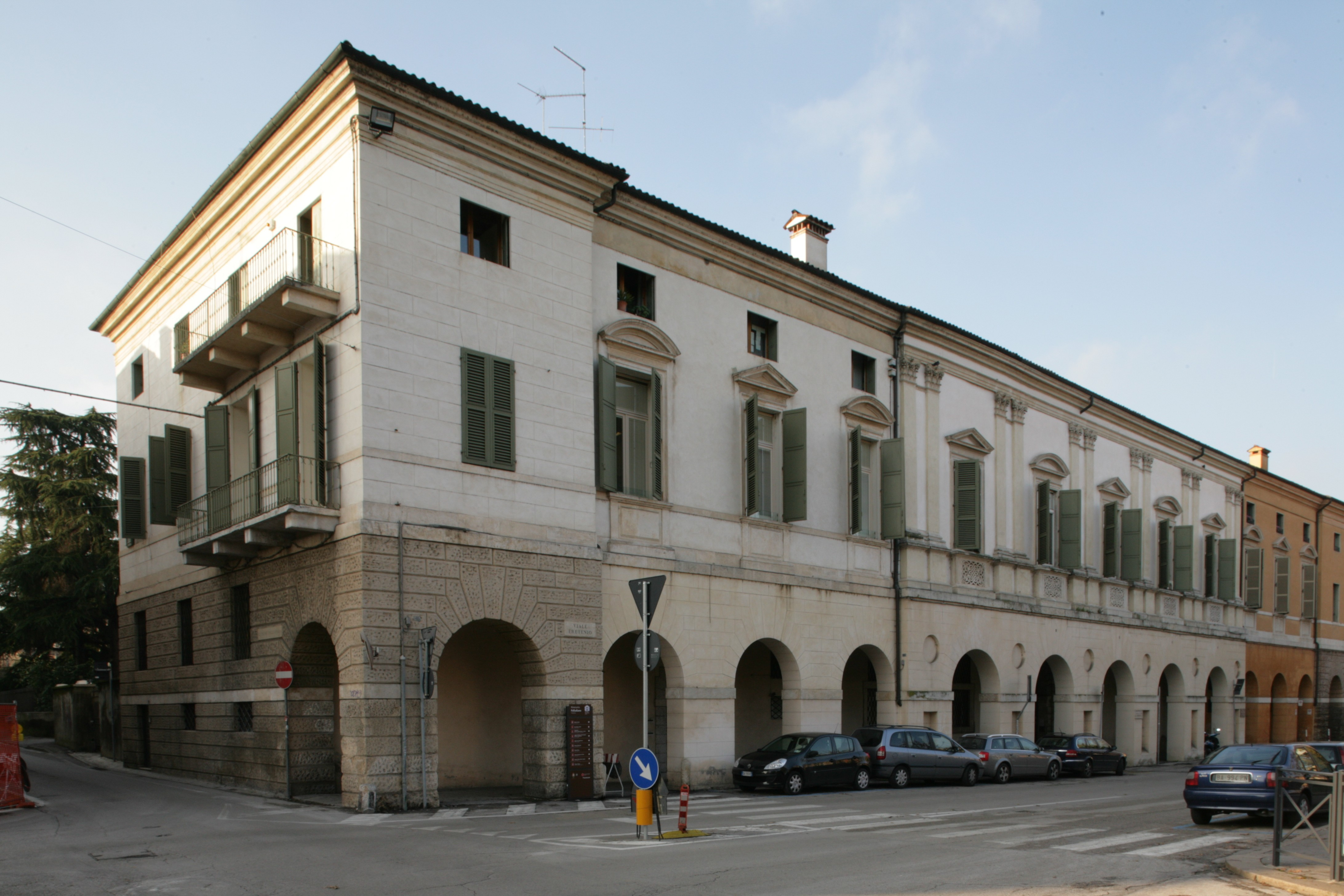
Civena Palace.

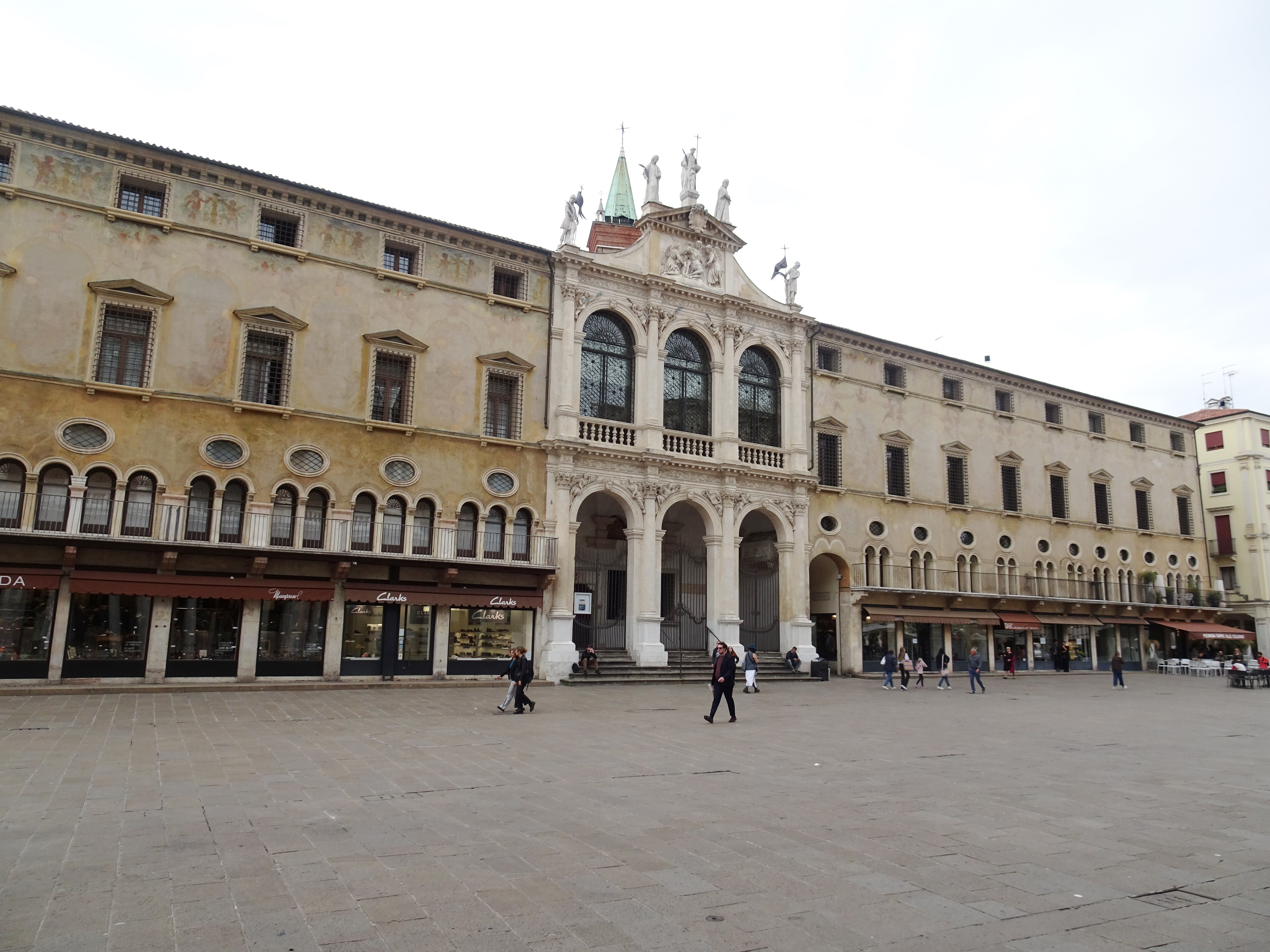
Headquarters of Monte di Pietà de Vicenza.

Maria Floridaura da Visitação (1709-1756), daughter of Angelo Todero and Curzia Sartori, born in Vicenza, received her formation in the Carmelite monastery of Verona and then, with the nuns of the Corpus Domini of Vicenza, she took the habit of the Teresines in 1727. She was seen as gifted woman with many virtues and wrote two works of Christian mysticism that, according to Sebastiano Rumor, "attest to the ardor of her faith and charity, which made her heavenly still on earth".

The family of Leonardo, Giovanni Antonio, Benedetto Maria, Valentin and Eugenio had many lands, houses, palaces and other assets in Vicenza, Creazzo, Colzè, Monticello Conte Otto and Cavazzale throughout the 18th century. At the same time, the family of Zuanne and his son Iseppo had houses and part of the Civena Palace in Vicenza, which was designed by Andrea Palladio, as well as land and a country seat in Montemezzo, a town next door to Creazzo. Pietro, between 1772 and 1774, was administrator of the important Mount of piety charitable entity in Vicenza, and Lodovico, active at the end of the 18th century, was a priest and poet, leaving sonnets, panegyrics and a De Profundis.

After the Napoleonic invasion, over a long period of wars and revolts and profound political and economic changes in the 19th century, the old Vincentian elite went into decay, most families became impoverished and were dislodged from their positions, being absorbed into the middle class and replaced by a new ruling class.

Anyway, some Sartori stood out in the 19th century, such as: Antonio, son of Giovanni, knight, doctor of laws, notary between 1839 and 1864, member of the Chamber of Notaries of Veneto in 1855, dead in 1886 and honored as a benefactor with the erection of a bust in the chapel of notable citizens in 1895; Jacopo, high-ranking official of the Provincial Deputation in 1868, and Paolo, son of Giuseppe, lawyer, knight, commendator, one of the three trustees of the BBVA of Vicenza in 1883, president of the Cassa di Risparmio di Asti, president of Mount of piety in 1909, president of the Banco Popolare from 1916 to 1927, art collector, creator of a cycle of frescoes on the history of Moses by Domenico Bruschi on the Monte di Pietà, and president for eight years of the Musical Society of Quartet.

Giovanni Maria (Vicenza, July 11, 1925 - Innsbruck, September 26, 1998), born in an impoverished branch, was the son of Attilio and Lucia Volpato, and brother of Bruno, Tito and Angela. Like his brothers, he studied at the Minor Seminary of Vicenza from 1936 and was ordained a priest in 1948. He was secretary of Catholic Action, distinguished by his dynamism and organizing ability. In 1959, he was appointed episcopal delegate, at a time when Catholic Action had more than one hundred thousand followers. In 1962, he graduated in Canon Law, and in 1969, he was appointed rector of the Vicenza Seminary, where, for ten years, he had been teaching the theology of the laity and the social doctrine of the Church. In 1977, he was consecrated bishop of Adria. He cared to know his diocese in detail, worked for the poor, the immigrants and the marginalized, and promoted diocesan missions. He was a fierce critic of abortion, defended the participation of Catholics in politics, and became involved in controversies. Appointed archbishop of Trento in 1987, he sought to know his people closely and was highly regarded for his fatherly care for the underprivileged, but again caused controversy for his insistent attempts to meddle in the school curriculum and other secular matters. He also received criticism for his conservatism, his excessive disciplinary zeal, and his difficulty in dealing with the challenging issues of contemporary times.

== Main Branches ==
=== Seven Communes ===
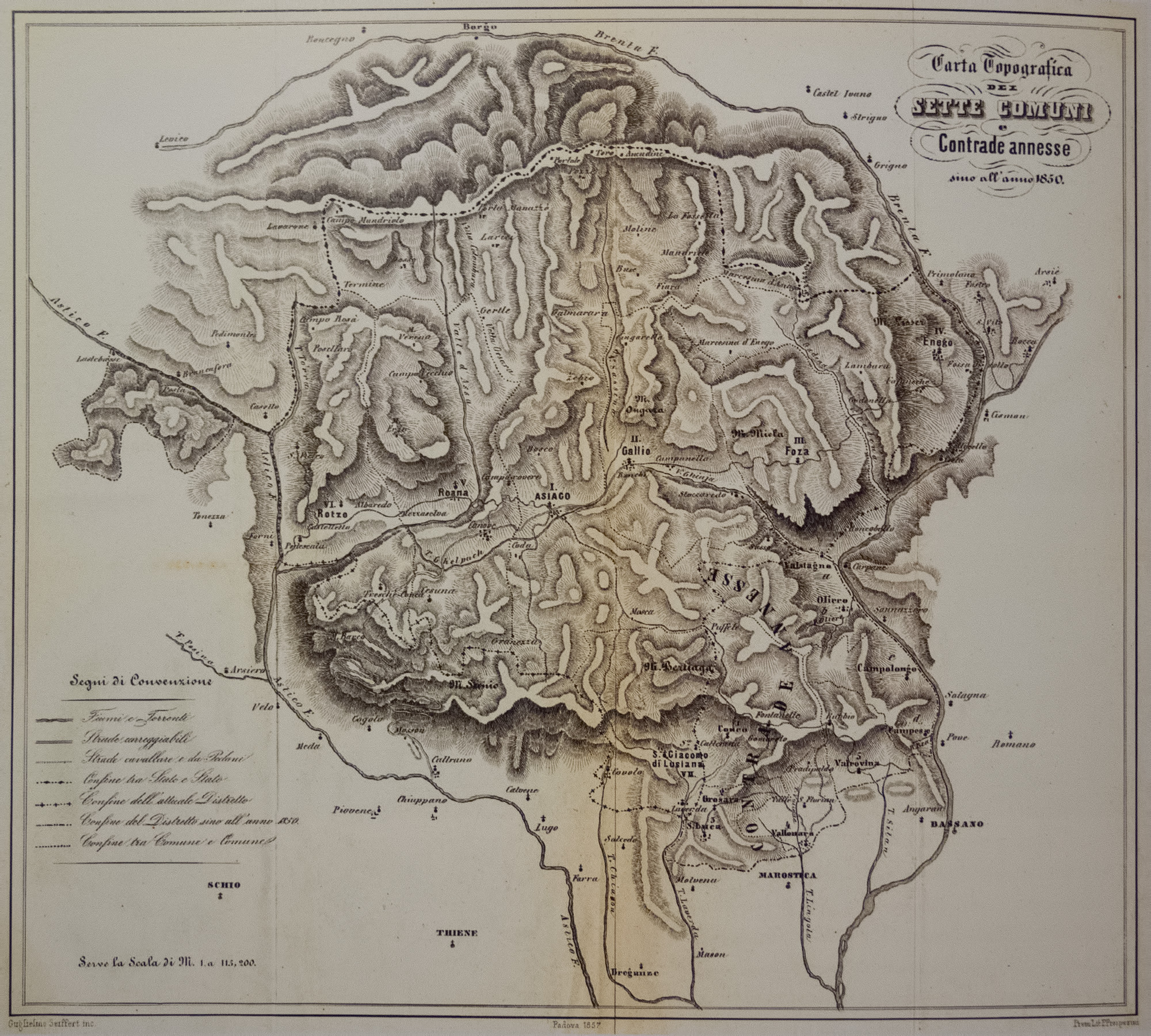
Topographical map of the Seven Communes region.

Centered in Roana, a member of the Federation of Seven Communes of the Vincentian plateau (plus Asiago, Lusiana, Enego, Foza, Gallio, and Rotzo), the surrounding localities have been marked by the presence of the Sartori since the 14th century, either through property ownership or residence. However, the context of the region did not favor the survivalof the old feudal nobility of the family. In 1405, the Federation submitted to Venice and was made a district of Vicenza, which maintained a captain or vicar there, preserving, however, a great autonomy, its customs and its old fiscal and commercial privileges. By the 16th century, the region's fiefdoms were almost all extinct, as since the 13th century, the communes had been jointly consolidating a system of semi-democratic communal government known as vicinanza, with a local council made up of all the heads of households, able to legislate locally, appoint administrative officials, and oversee public accounts, as well as a dean (head of state with ceremonial and representative functions), and a syndic (head of government with executive functions). The capital of the Federation was Asiago, where the Regency met, a council consisting of one or two ministers from each commune under the coordination of a chancellor, who centralized the federative administration and foreign policy, arbitrated disputes, and appointed the nuncios (procurators of the Regency in some other city). The administration of justice and military defense, however, were largely in charge of the podesteria of Vicenza, representing the Venetian government. Most of the territory was collectively owned, indivisible and inalienable, and there was no division of society into rigid estates, no formal class of nobles, and no legal definition of nobility. Even so, there was a bourgeois patriciate made up of the wealthiest and most cultured families and those who obtained the highest public offices. The nineteenth-century historian Giuseppe Nalli said that the family's presence honored the Seven Communes. Some members are recorded in the region with noble titles, such as Bonato, Marco and Giovanni Martino, but the sources do not clarify how they were obtained.

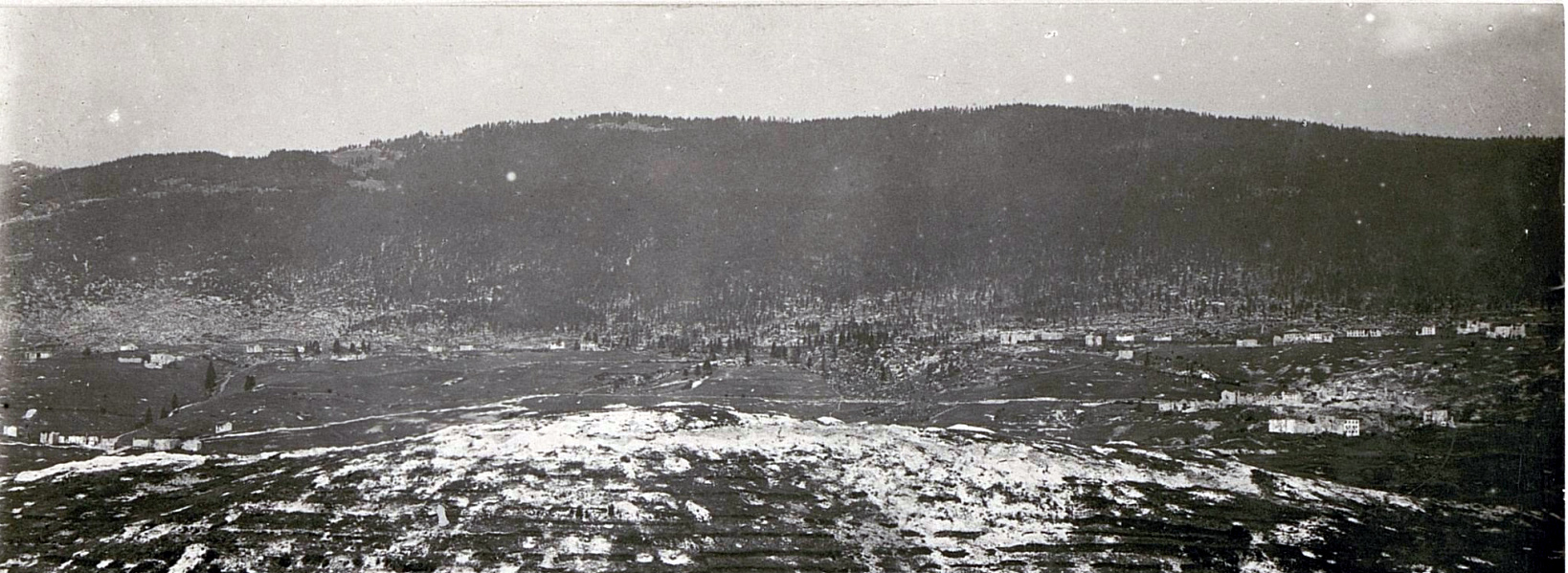
Mount Erio in Roana, former Sartori property..

In Roana, in addition to the fief received from Bishop Andrea dei Mozzi in 1295, which gave rise to the contrada Sartori, they owned the Erio and Verena mountains, the fief of Verenetta and other properties. According to Alessandro Scandale, the family was one of the protagonists in the legal separation of Roana from Rotzo and its constitution as a new commune in 1300.

Marco de Roana was a condottiero in the service of the Republic of Venice, distinguishing himself in the wars against the Ottomans at the end of the 17th century. He was captain during the siege of Budapest and governor of Venetian Dalmatia (today in Montenegro). He fought bravely at Grahovo, a crucial place to contain the advance of the Ottomans. According to a report of July 19, 1690 from the Venetian Provider Nicolò Erizzo to the Senate, "General Sartori has rendered fruitful service in Grahovo, showing great prudence in transmitting my instructions to the inhabitants of that plain in order that they remain faithful to the Most Serene Majesty, and has succeeded very well in dispelling the hesitation in which they were walking regarding whether or not to submit to the pasha of Herzegovina". He goes on to say that he commissioned Sartori to inspect two advanced detachments, which he did with a force of 40 armed peasants and 30 soldiers, finding them in extreme disorder, when he was attacked by 400 Ottoman horsemen who recognized him. He defended himself with his soldiers and two peasants, while the others fled:

Furious was the attack, but intrepid was the resistance, and after three hours of bloody and uncertain combat, the impetus and valor of those few Christians prevailed over the enemy, though reinforced by their own infantry, who, fighting generously, opened the way for an honorable retreat, taking refuge in the Tower with the only loss of 14 of their companions, and seven other men, who with several villagers, distinguished themselves in reinforcing the former, bravely sacrificing themselves in your lordship's glorious service, not without first causing considerable havoc among the boldest Turks, among whom was the commander of Nevisigne, who was also killed. [...] Marco Sartori, bravely sustaining with his few soldiers the aggression of the barbarians, and repelling the temerity of the boldest, fulfilling in this as in the other battles of those memorable hardships the function that was his, is credited with the merit of a good officer and faithful subject of Your Lordships, whom I recommend to reward him with a gold medal.

In the 17th century, Griguolo, son of Zan, was dean of Roana. In 1702, the nobleman Giovanni Martino, son of Tommaso e married to Angela Cerato degli Orsini of Valdastico, died in Roana. At the time, his family still very rich and notable. In 1729, brothers Marco, Francesco and Fabbio founded a chapel in the contrada Sartori, dedicated to St. Philip Neri, destroyed in World War I and restored in 1931. In 1743, the Regency appointed Fabbio, doctor of laws, as plenipotentiary nuncio in Vicenza, charged with the task of settling a dispute between the Seven Communes and the commune of Montecchio Maggiore, and in 1745 gave fundamental legal help in the process of recovering the lost privileges of the Federation customs. Giovanni Battista (*1830) was rector of the Church of Saint Justina in Roana and festive chaplain in Cesuna.

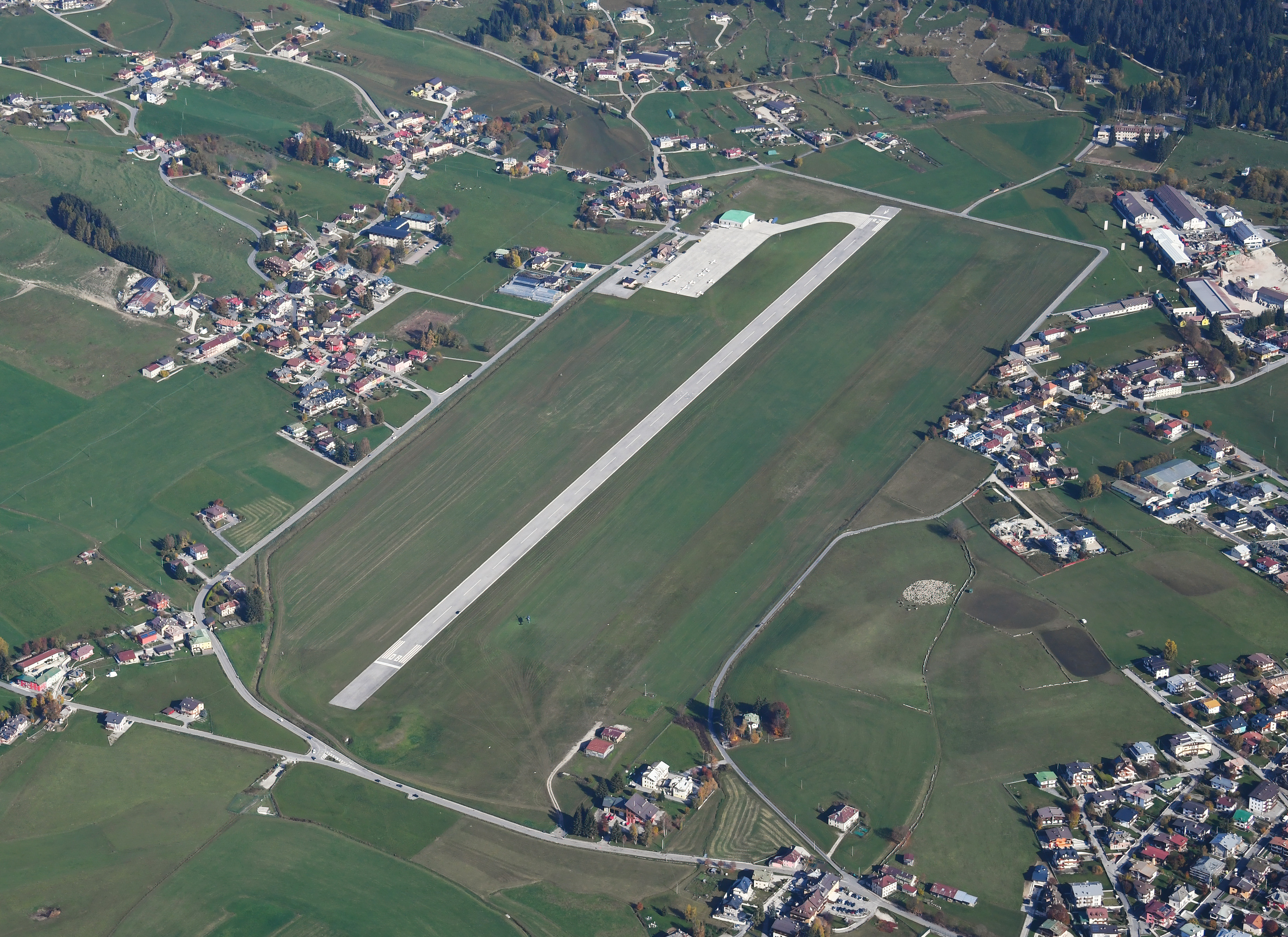
Romeo Sartori Airport in Asiago.

Corrado, a World War I artillery lieutenant and aerial reconnaissance specialist, was awarded the Silver Medal of Military Valor by the War Ministry for the "singular skill" of his technical work and for being a "constant example of contempt for all danger, of self-denial and steadfastness". Romeo Arturo (1897-1933), fighter pilot during World War I, served in several squadrons; distinguished for bravery, he was promoted to sergeant and received the Bronze and Silver Medals of Military Valor. After the war, he served as a flight instructor and test pilot, and often exhibited himself as a pilot of aerobatics and simulated combat, winning competitions such as the Circuito delle Marche in 1921 and the I Convegno Aereo Nazionale of Florence in 1922, as well as representing Italy in an international championship in Geneva in 1925. Dead in a plane crash, he received other honors, such as the Medal of the Italo-Austrian War 1915–1918, the Medal of Italian Unity, and the Medal of Victory; his name is the name of a street in Roana and of the Asiago airport.

Luigi (1924-2007), ordained priest in 1946, graduated in theology at the Diocesan Seminary of Padua, specialized in Ecclesiology and doctorate at the Pontifical Gregorian University in Rome, was professor of Dogmatic and Ecumenical Theology at the Seminary for many years, where he founded the magazine Studia patavina and left several works. According to Paola Zampieri, he is considered one of the fathers of modern Italian theology. For Antonio Ricupero, who did his doctorate on his work, the synthesis of his thought can be expressed in the phrase "faith is the leaven of history," adding: "In his theology, we read a creative reception of the innovations of the Second Vatican Council, in which he was able to grasp the vital germs and the paths susceptible of new developments. [...] Sartori followed the events of his time with passion and participation, inside and outside the church, trying to discern in them the role and the creative force of the Spirit who guides toward the future. In my opinion, the roots of the continuity of the coherent witness he gave in his life and the interpretative key to all his vast theological production lie in the profound and vital relationship between faith and history".

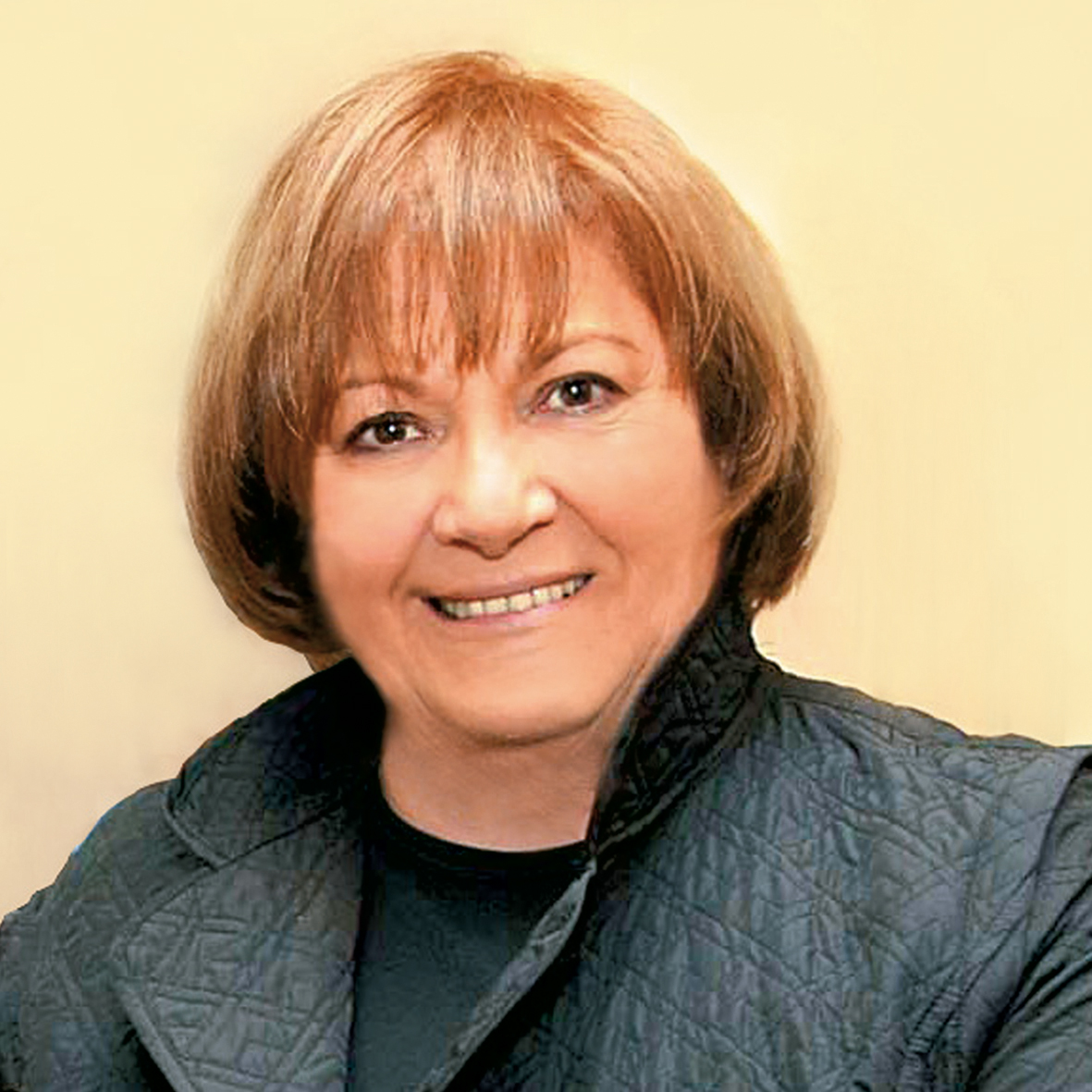
Amalia Sartori.

Amalia, also known as Lia, born in Valdastico in 1947 but descended from the branch of Roana, was a teacher, member of the European Parliament for three terms, holding several positions, including: Chair of the Committee on Industry, Research and Energy; Vice-chair of the Delegation to the EU-Bulgaria Joint Parliamentary Committee and of the Delegation for relations with the NATO Parliamentary Assembly. She was also member of the Delegation for relations with the Andean Community countries; of the Delegation for relations with the United States; of the Conference of Committee Chairs; of the Committees on Economic and Monetary Affairs; on Women's Rights and Equal Opportunities; on Environment, Public Health and Food Safety; on Civil Liberties, Justice and Home Affairs; and on Budgets, but was accused of illegal funding to the parties involved in the Venice MOSE Project.

From Lusiana can be cited Bonato, procurator of the commune for the collection of taxes in 1572; messere Marco, son of Bonato, one of the guarantors in a commercial contract made in Roana in 1590; Baptista, son of Gasparo son of Bonato, dean of Lusiana; Bortolo, one of the governors of the commune in 1787; the physician Zuane, active in Oliero (Valstagna) at the beginning of the 17th century; the "clearest" priest Francesco (*1774), abbot, vice-adjutor of the Parish of St. Andrew in Padua in 1816, and parish priest of St. Paul in Monselice in 1819; Father Domenico (*1800), rector of the Church of St. Stephen in Carpenedolo in 1836.

Giovanni Antoni, from Foza, was nuncio to the Federation in 1696. In Enego, around 1700, there is Antonio, a lumberman and one of the witnesses in the beatification process of Gregorio Barbarigo. Domenico was receiver of Rotzo at the beginning of the 20th century.

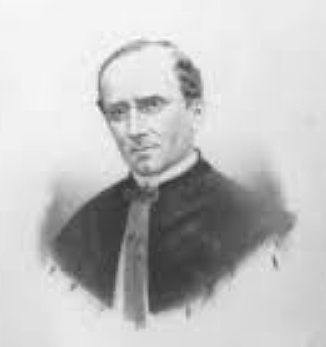
Giambattista Sartori Pertile.

From Asiago, capital of the Federation, can be mentioned Giovanni Steffano, one of the governors of the city in 1683; in 1713, signor Giovanni Gregorio was nuncio to the Federation in Venice, presenting the situation of the region with many witnesses and making many complaints about the shortages the population was experiencing because of wars, plagues and natural disasters; in 1716, Francesco was nuncio to Venice and in charge of settling a dispute regarding the Federation customs. Father Domenico was chaplain of St. Bartholomew's in Fara in the 19th century. Giambattista Pertile (1801-1884), son of Cristiano and Antonia Sartori, was a priest, doctor of theology, chaplain of the Lombardo-Venetian National Guard, professor of Italian language and literature at the Academy of Languages in Vienna, laureate professor of ecclesiastical law at the University of Pavia, where he was rector between 1846 and 1847, lecturer in international law at the University of Padua, and left several books; for his merits, he received the Order of Saints Maurice and Lazarus with the rank of Officer and the Order of the Crown of Italy with the rank of Commander.

Jacopo Mattielli, son of Leonardo and Caterina Sartori, born in 1819, graduated as a doctor in Padua, worked in the House of Health, and during the unification wars, proved to be a fierce patriot, being exiled by the Austrian government in 1849, going to Switzerland, where he remained until 1853. He then returned to Padua, where he made a reputation in medicine, dying in 1899. He left a number of writings, including a biography of the physician Gian Giacomo Mazzola, a compilation of historical facts from Asiago, and a treatise on the history of medicine in the 18th century.

Gallio produced several notable priests. Giovan Domenico, son of Lunardo de Gallio, was a councilor in 1604. Giandomenico Paccanaro (1745-1801), son of Pierantonio and Elisabetta Sartori, abbot, doctor of mathematics and philosophy, taught physics at the University of Padua and was highly praised as a professor of philosophy. He was a member of the Accademia Roveretana degli Agiati and of the Accademia Patavina di Scienze, Lettere ed Arti. Giacomo (*1813), curate of St. Michael in Arlesega in 1851, parish preacher of Vanzo in 1857, and curate of Santa Maria Assunta in Padua in 1871.

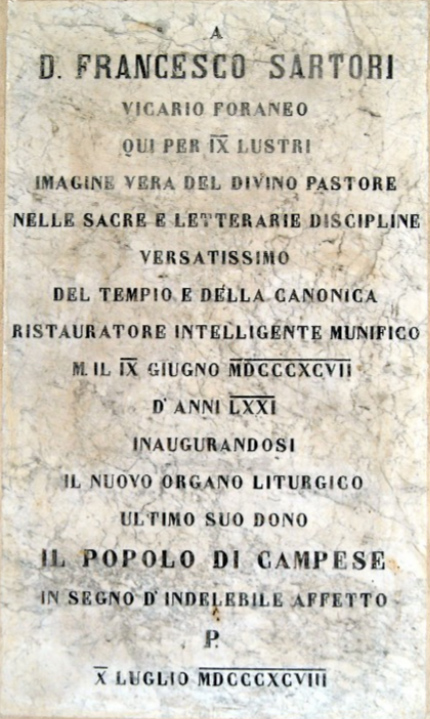
Lápide commemorativa da beneficência de don Francesco Sartori, instalada na igreja paroquial de Campese, 1898.

Francesco (1826-1897), son of Carlo and Catherine Finco, studied at the Seminary of Padua and was ordained a priest in 1849. He was chaplain of Saint Bartholomew in Crosara, parish priest in Mellame, and then took over as archpriest of the parish of Campese, in Bassano, where he was highly esteemed for his pastoral work. He restored the Benedictine monastery in 1855 and the parish church in 1870, which was declared a National Monument in 1878; he was a poet, a prolific historian, and for his merits was awarded the Order of Saints Maurice and Lazarus in the rank of Knight.

Cristiano (1818-1889), son of Lorenzo and Elena Pertile, was parish priest of St. Giacomo in Lusiana, rector of St. Anthony Abbot in Valstagna, archpriest of St. Michael in Selvazzano and prebendary in Mandriola; he joined the Austrian army to fight the French in the Brenta valley and, with the rank of Major, commanded a company that was part of the Walden Column. His brother Carlo (*1832) studied in Gallio and Valstagna, and graduated in theology, Philosophy and Humanities at the Seminary of Padua, where he was professor of Italian Literature, Mathematics and Ecclesiastical History. Ordained a priest in 1860, he was also noted for his activity in social causes, being a great preacher, confessor, apostolic protonotary, canon of the Cathedral of Padua and chancellor of the diocesan presidency of the Schools of Christian Doctrine. He left many writings, including panegyrics, biographies, doctrinal and devotional works, poems, and historical works. His other brother Francesco (1835-1903) did his gymnasium in Bassano and graduated in Philosophy and Theology at the Seminary of Padua. Ordained a priest in 1858, he was chaplain in Anguillara and prebendate of Count Capodilista in Selvazzano, where Cristiano was archpriest. In 1889, when his brother died, he obtained his prebend from the Count of Sambonifacio in Mandriola. He left numerous historical works, as well as prosopographies of noble families, biographies, catechisms, and devotional works, receiving the approval and friendship of many scholars.

Lorenzo (1805-1885) was archpriest of St. Bartholomew's in Gallio, rector of St. George's in Perlena, vicar of St. Andrew's in Padua, spiritual director and rector of the Seminary of Padua, dean of the Cathedral Chapter, and vicar general of the diocese. Antonio Domenico was secretary to the bishop of Ceneda, counselor of the Academy of Philosophy at the University of Padua, treatise on theology, teacher and historian, whose masterpiece is the much cited La Storia della Federazione dei Sette Comuni (1956). He is the name of a street in Gallio.

The group of the Seven Communes produced many other minor priests, such as Domenico (Lusiana), rector of St. Stephen's in Carpenedo in 1836; Domenico (Asiago, 1825), curate chaplain of St. Bartholomew's in Fara; Francesco (Gallio, 1835), curated chaplain of St. Michael in Selvazzano; Catterino (Rotzo, 1839), curated chaplain of St. Vescovano in Vescovana; Francesco (Lusiana, 1839), parish priest of St. Giacomo and St. Giustina in Padua.

=== Valstagna ===
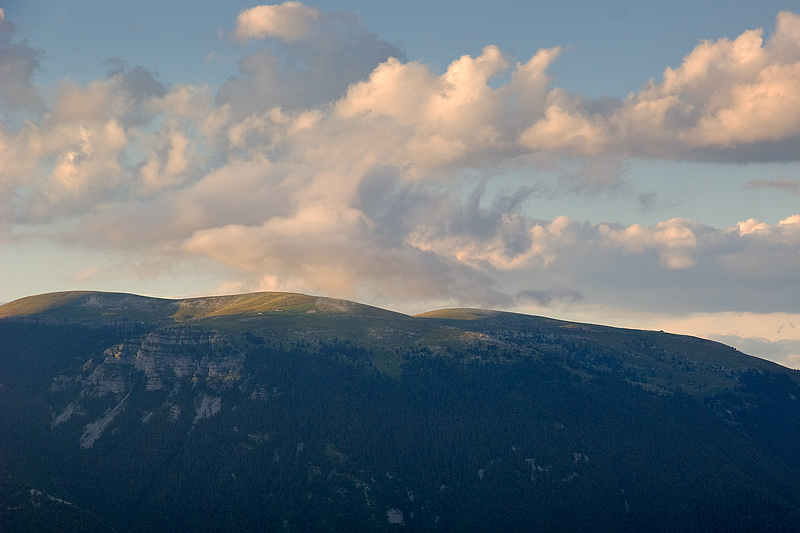
Mount Melette in Foza, former property of the Sartori.

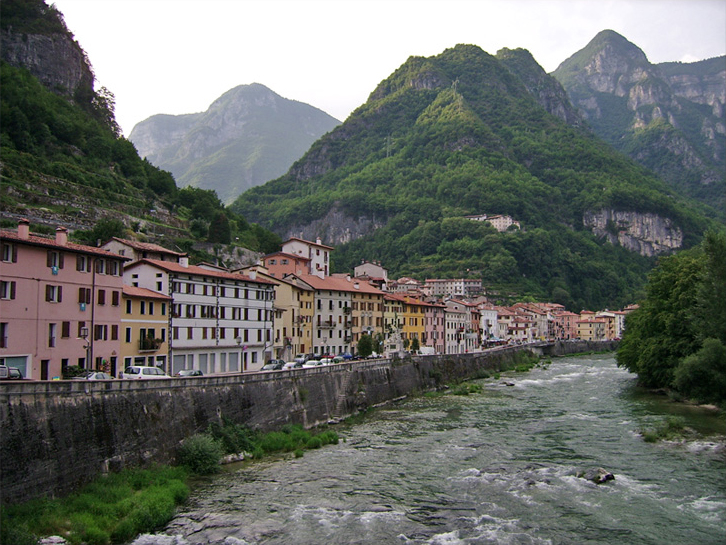
Valstagna on the banks of the Brenta.

In the middle of the 15th century, some members of the Sartori family left from Foza and Asiago, settling in Valstagna, in the valley of the Brenta River, in a region called Valsugana, where they began their career as great merchants in the early 16th century, which would make them very wealthy. The commune was endowed with extensive forest, had numerous sawmills, and was one of the main centers of timber extraction in the pre-Alpine region. It held an important regional fair and, as it was situated on the banks of the Brenta, it occupied a strategic position in the transport system of a vast commercial network that began in Trento, passed through the Seven Communes, included most of the Vicentine-Bassanese-Feltrina plain, and reached Padua and Venice. As a result, Brenta became known as the "lumber route". By the 15th century, during the consolidation of Venetian rule, this commercial network was already perfectly articulated and involved considerable amounts of money. Valstagna also had no formal noble class, organizing itself socially and politically as a vicinanza. In the 16th century, it composed a commune legally merged with Oliero and Campolongo sul Brenta, and bordered Asiago, Gallio, Foza and Enego, with which it maintained strong commercial ties. In the past it had been part of the Federation of the Seven Communes as a district.

Apparently, Pietro was the first of the Seven Communes to be present in Valsugana, being Asiago's deputy in Valstagna in 1440. There, they were part of the bourgeois patriciate, owned a rural palace in contrada Lora and one in the urban center, and a private altar in the parish church. Later, some members left this commune and settled in Vicenza, Bassano, Feltre, Longarone, and Belluno, especially brothers Antonio and Nicolò, natives of Valstagna, who maintained residences there while establishing bases in Vicenza and Bassano.

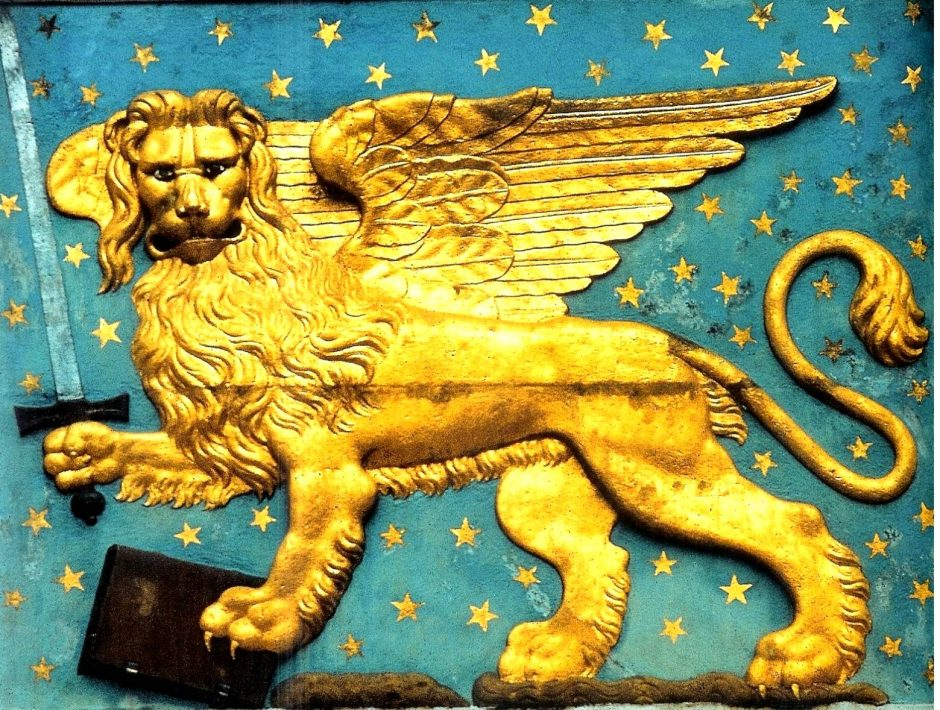
Saint Mark's Lion on the facade of the Civic Tower in Valstagna Square

Antonio was a wealthy lumber merchant who owned half of the Miella and Vanzo mountains, forests and sawmills in Primiero, and a fortified palace in the central square of Valstagna; he received Bassano citizenship in 1592 and was admitted to the Council in 1599. In Valstagna, he gained an infamous reputation in the early 17th century after being accused by the vicini of repeated displays of intolerable haughtiness and insolence, which caused rough friction with other influential personages, drew grudges against him and disgraced the entire community, as well as claiming to dictate laws without the ability to do so and usurping the rights of others. On the morning of April 14, 1618, his situation became critical when, without the community's knowledge, workers brought by him from Bassano began to demolish an imposing chapel in the central square, whose frontispiece bore the image of the Lion of Saint Mark, symbol of Venetian authority, while his armed militiamen guarded it from the windows of his house. The community soon noticed the movement and erupted in great commotion, but the damage had already been done.

The real motives for such acts are unclear and their progress is not fully documented. However, in the petition that the community brought against him to the Venetian Council of Ten, he was denounced for impiety and lese-majesty, for the destruction of the chapel and the Lion of St. Mark, and for fraud, for having presented a license for the demolition of the podestà of Marostica obtained with false justifications and that was never ratified by the Council of Valstagna. Despite the gravity of the case, some magistrates were suspicious of the veracity of the story, leading the Council of Ten not to form a majority and to postpone a decision. New injunctions were filed, and the defense justified itself by claiming that Sartori's intention was only to transfer the chapel to a more favorable location as a public utility; the case dragged on for months as tension between the community and Sartori increased. The sentence was handed down in May 1619 and required Sartori to rebuild the chapel and the Lion, a lenient penalty in view of the gravity of the charges. According to Claudio Povolo, who has studied the case, it seems that Sartori managed to convince the Venetian magistrates that the license he had obtained was valid and that he intended to preserve the Lion statue, and that its destruction was the result of an accident. Despite this, Sartori began to carry out reprisals, persecutions, and intimidations against those who testified against him, including organizing attacks with his militia, and in August, he even filed a complaint in Venice alleging that he was suffering attacks. After further conflicts, a peace agreement was signed on March 18, 1620, through the Venetian patrician Giovanni Tiepolo, but the exhaustion that Sartori suffered prevented him from continuing to be an active presence in communal life. He left at least three sons, Francesco, Sebastiano, and Giuseppe.

The trustees of Valstagna were Antonio in 1551, Francesco in 1567 and Nicolò in 1609. Francesco served the Republic of Venice, and in 1572, was procurator of Valstagna, Campolongo and Oliero. Leonardo was a counselor in 1810. Father Leonardo (*1819) was curate chaplain of the Church of St. Anthony, abbot of Valstagna in 1851 and rector of the Church of St. Bartholomew of Crosara in 1855.

=== Longarone ===
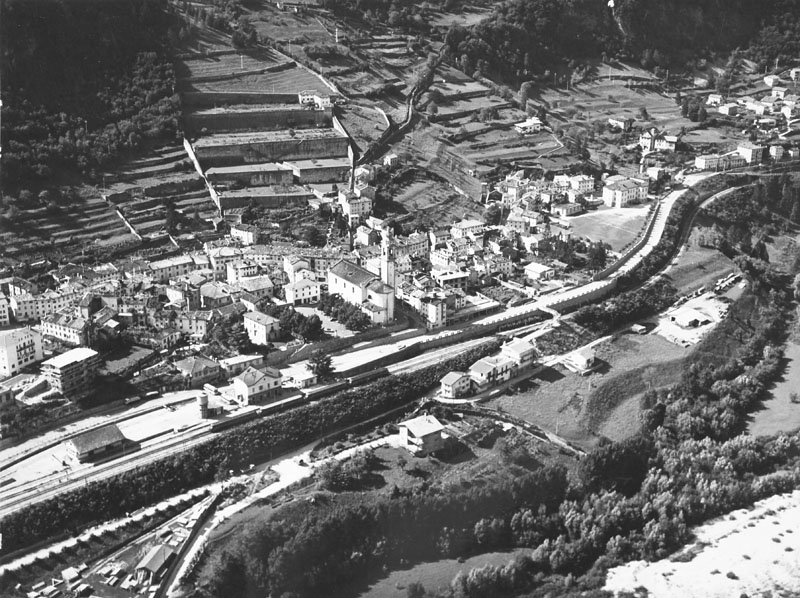
At the top of the image, view of the terraces and walls built by the Sartori family in Longarone.

Longarone was one of the main subsidiary headquarters of the Valstagna lumbermen. There, Orazio acquired land and forests in the 17th century, was admitted to the vicinia, and grew rich in the lumber trade. His son Iseppo became one of the leading local lumber merchants. He and his brothers, Girolamo and Zuanne, built a private seat of extraordinary size in the Parish Church of Pirago. Bragaggia says that private seats were a symbol of prestige, and their placement inside the church reflected the rigid social hierarchy of the community. The Sartori seat, besides being oversized, had been built without the license of the Vicini Rule, having only the license of the bishop, which created conflicts, and was eventually taken down by the angry community, along with the seats of other distinguished families, such as the Teza and the Pellizzaroli, with whom the Sartori had established ties by marriage. Francesco Sartori della Teza was a deputy of the Regra. Dominus Giuseppe Sartori was also a big lumber merchant and had a commercial representation in Venice, where he spent most of the year.

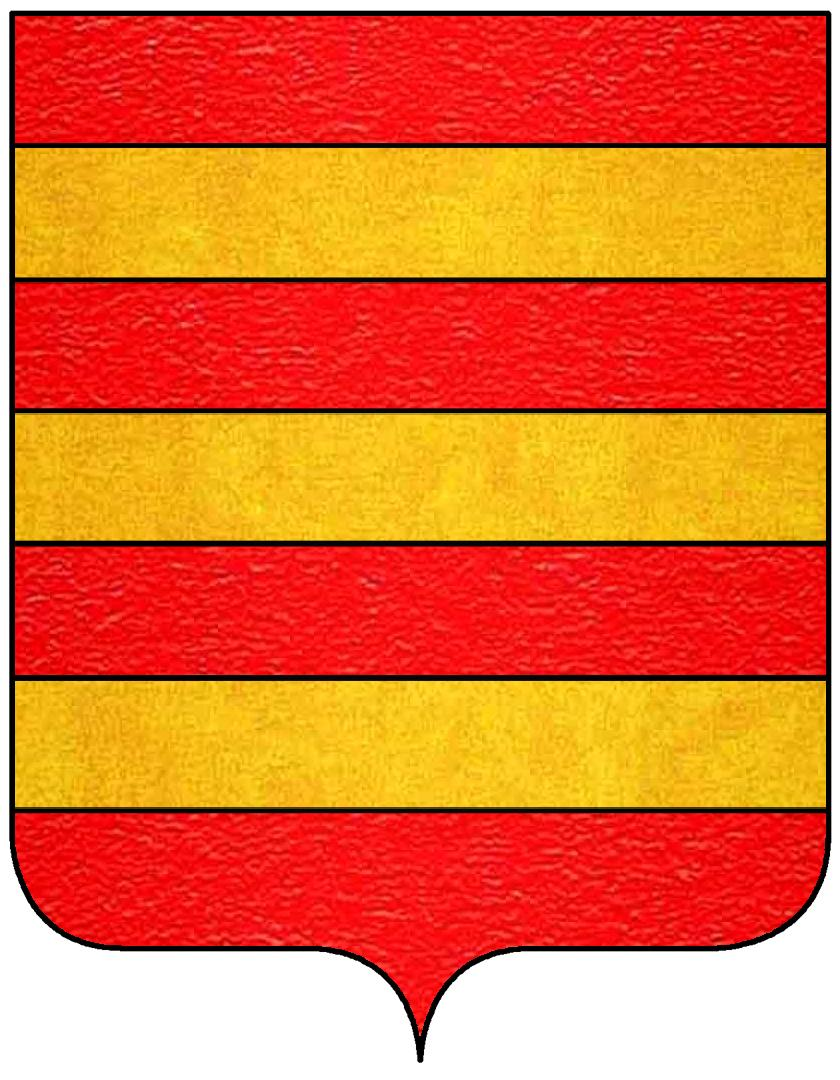
Grini-Sartori Coat of Arms.

In the early 18th century, the family built a villa on the slopes of Longarone's Mount Zucco surrounded by terraces, walls and staircases decorated with statues, a large complex that tradition says was started by Orazio and that, according to Dal Mas & Miot, constitutes the most extraordinary example in the region of man-made work to shape the mountain slopes. Afterwards, the family withdrew from commerce and were admitted to the nobility of Belluno. After joining the Grini family, they adopted its coat of arms. In the early 19th century, when they were still very wealthy, another Orazio extended the terraces and walls, which, at a time when famine was raging in the region, provided employment for many poor citizens, as well as protecting the community from landslides.

=== Bassano del Grappa ===
Bassano del Grappa became subject to Venice in 1404, and from the end of the 16th century, the commune began to assume the role of the main seat of the Vincentian Sartori, but they began their infiltration before that. In 1361, Gualberto is mentioned owning a house in Bassano. In 1436, Ferraro, son of Grandone of Asiago, together with his wife Bona, donated land they owned in Marchesane, Bassano district, to the convent of St. Francis in exchange for the celebration of one mass a year for the benefit of their souls. Ferraro resided in Angarano, formerly an independent commune, but now a district of Bassano, a locality also associated with the Sartori of Valstagna/Vicenza. In 1457, Antonio, son of Donato of Enego, had land in Bassano. In 1458, Bassano Sartore was living in Bassano. Giovanni Antonio, son of the aforementioned Bertoldo of Castegna, appears in 1502 buying land for 32 gold ducats in Angarano. By the end of the 16th century, the family would have 150 fields in Angarano.

Established on the banks of the Brenta, Bassano del Grapa was a small but dynamic commune, fulfilling a significant role in the timber trade network as the base of an important regional market and a customs office, and receiving timber harvested in a region of about a thousand square kilometers. It had a river port that provided an obligatory technical stop for lumber coming down the Brenta from the mountains, because there, already on the plain, the logs that came floating free on the river were tied together, forming rafts in order to continue their journey to Padua and Venice. There, the Sartori business interests found a favorable location for better articulation, since Bassano was located much closer to their many estates than Vicenza. According to Francesco Vianello, "some families established in Bassano but originating from those lands, among them the Sartori, the Carraro, the Perli and the Scolari, just to name a few, had more interests in the Brenta valley, and although they had palaces in Bassano, they maintained residences and properties in the places where they originated, where they had built the basis of their wealth". Walter Panciera says:

Between the late medieval period and the 16th century, the wood market was the exclusive business of a handful of families from the lower Valsugana vicentina (Valstagna, Oliero) and bassanese (Primolano, Carpanè, Solagna), but not without the presence of entrepreneurs coming from other centers at the foot of the mountains, such as Grigno and Fonsazo, near Padua and Venice. Over time, on the other hand, there was a progressive concentration of merchants in Bassano, to where, beginning in the 16th century and also in the following century, some important merchant-entrepreneur families, such as the Sartori, the Perli, the Gardellini, moved, no doubt in order to take advantage in the city of a greater diversification of economic opportunities, not to mention the convenience of living in a small but lively and well-structured urban environment, center of fairs and markets. [...] The sign of its crucial importance and of its intense activity is given by the presence of groups of merchants coming from more distant areas, and then, roughly from the middle of the 17th century, by the penetration of great Venetian noble capital, from families such as the Contarini, Venier, Capello, which allowed a continuous renewal of the companies and a greater integration with the entire regional economy.

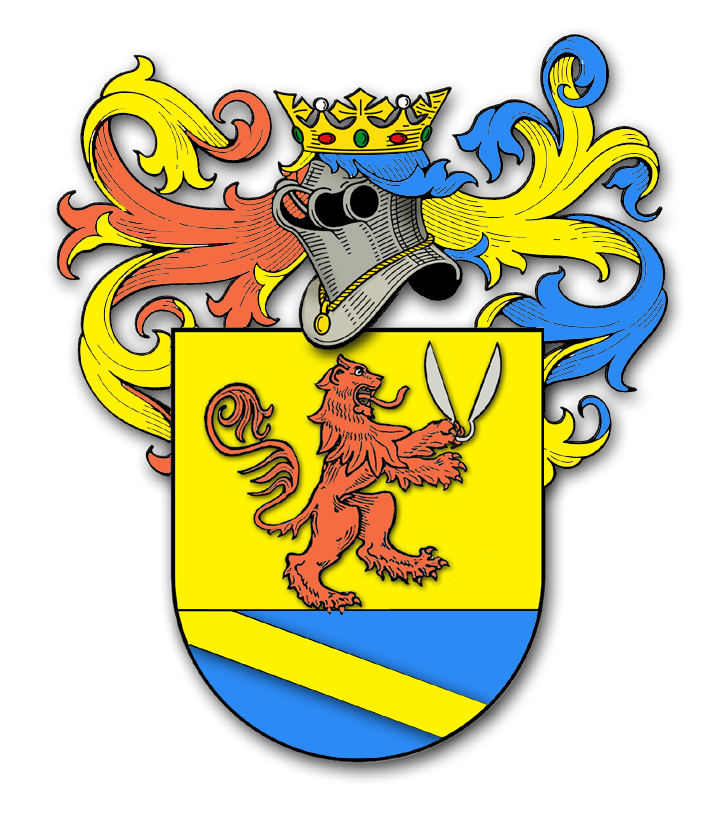
Coat of arms of the Bassano del Grappa group.

The advantages that the commune offered were expressed in the application for Bassanese citizenship addressed to the council, which stated that the place was a pleasant location and that it would allow them to exercise their trade as merchants with usefulness and decorum. They were one of the wealthiest families in the city, and according to the Comitato per la Storia di Bassano, they became famous there and achieved "a social position of the first magnitude". In Bassano, the possession of citizenship rights also traditionally came with a nobilitating quality and gave access to the council and to administrative positions, but for the exercise of public office, fixed residence in the city and the possession of a substantial patrimony were required. The incompatibility between commerce and nobility, which began to gain strength in the main Italian centers in the mid-16th century and which was one of the causes of the destitution of the Vicenza group, would only become a consensual ideology much later in Bassano, which at this time was still a city beginning its political and economic affirmation.

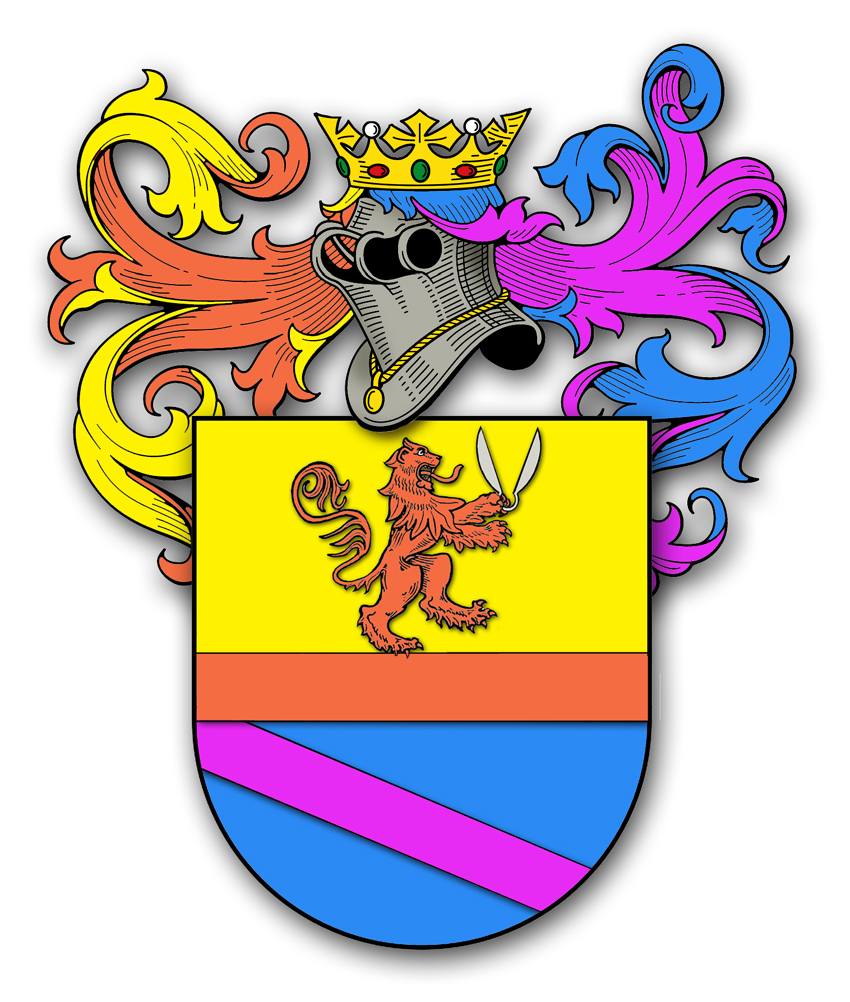
Variant of the coat of arms of the Bassano del Grappa group, dating from the 17th century. In the 18th century, another slightly different variant, with the green lion, was inscribed on the facade of the Sartori-Moritsch House.

The Most Excellent Lord Girolamo, son of Nicolò, was a feudatory in Foza, a member of the Bassano Council and a public health provider in that city, but during the plague of 1631, people suspected him of hiding sick people in his house, which caused his kidnapping and murder. In fact, he was ill himself, as he declared in his will. His brother Giulio, married to a Bellavidi and father of Sartorio (*1605), was a wealthy patrician of Vicenza and Bassano, well provided with allies and protectors, and because of his prestige, the excesses he committed were always treated very benevolently by the authorities. In 1663, the Sartori of Bassano sold the mountain Sasso Rosso in Foza to Giacomo Hora for the fortune of 2,025 ducats, comprising 245 fields, pastures and forests.

Giovanna Francesca, Benedictine, was abbess of the Venerable Monastery of Saint Jerome at the end of the 18th century. Girolamo II, son of Giulio II and the noble Angela Teresa Baggio, was a poet of panegyrics, octaves, and sonnets, and left a treatise on marriage and a manuscript narrating the history of the Sartori family. Married to the Countess Angela Brazolo, he was the father of Jacopo (Giacomo) Nicolò Sartorio Sartori (1764-1824), who left a historical chronicle about Bassano, an ode and other writings. He was married to Angela Berno, fathering Girolamo III Alvise Giacomo (1789), Angela (1790), Luigi (1791), Giacomo Nicolò (1791), Giulio IIII Antonio Sartorio (1793), Roberto Sartorio (1799) and Angela (1810). Roberto (1799-1872) was an official of the Monte di Pietà and a poet. Giulio III was a poet and member of the Accademia degli Intraprendenti.

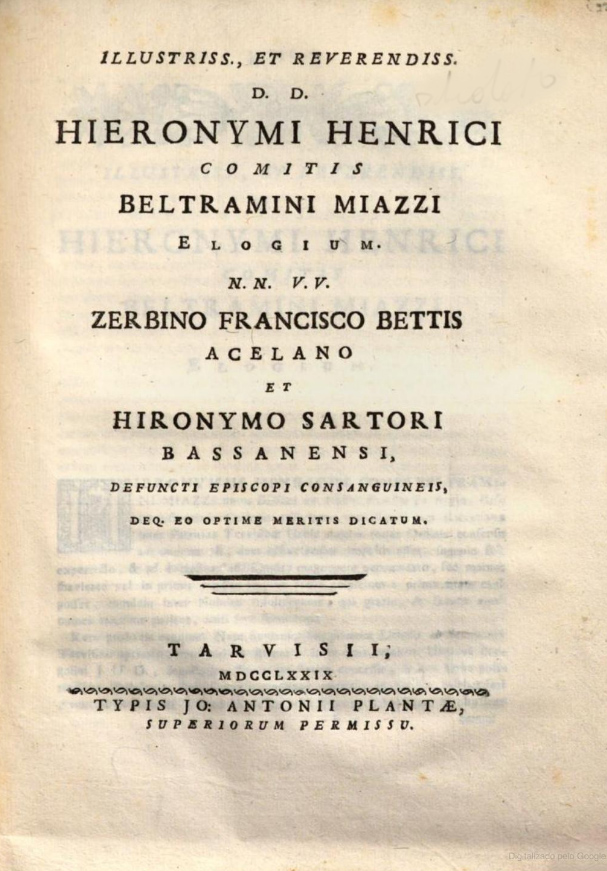
Cover of Eulogium, panegyric addressed to Count and Bishop Girolamo Miazzi, written by Girolamo Sartori and Francesco Zerbino Betti, his blood relatives, 1779.

In Bassano, unlike in Vicenza, the Sartori held important positions in the public administration and in the council for a long time, succeeding in joining a broad reorganization of the ruling class that, between the 15th and 16th centuries, suffered a process of closure, making access to the Council much more difficult, restricted to a small group of families. After Antonio and Nicolò, admitted in 1599, the family participated in the Council at least until the end of the 18th century. Jacopo, Alvise and Giulio were councilors in 1796. That year, during the French invasion, Jacopo's estate in the countryside sheltered Italian troops. There was fighting and his land was completely devastated.

In 1726, they were confirmed in the nobility of Bassano, a status recognized by the Republic of Venice, and were reconfirmed as nobles in 1816, 1821, 1841 and 1897. His main residence in Bassano, now known as the Sartori-Moritsch House, has been declared "of particularly important cultural interest" by the Ministry of Cultural Goods and Activities.

=== Crespano and Possagno ===
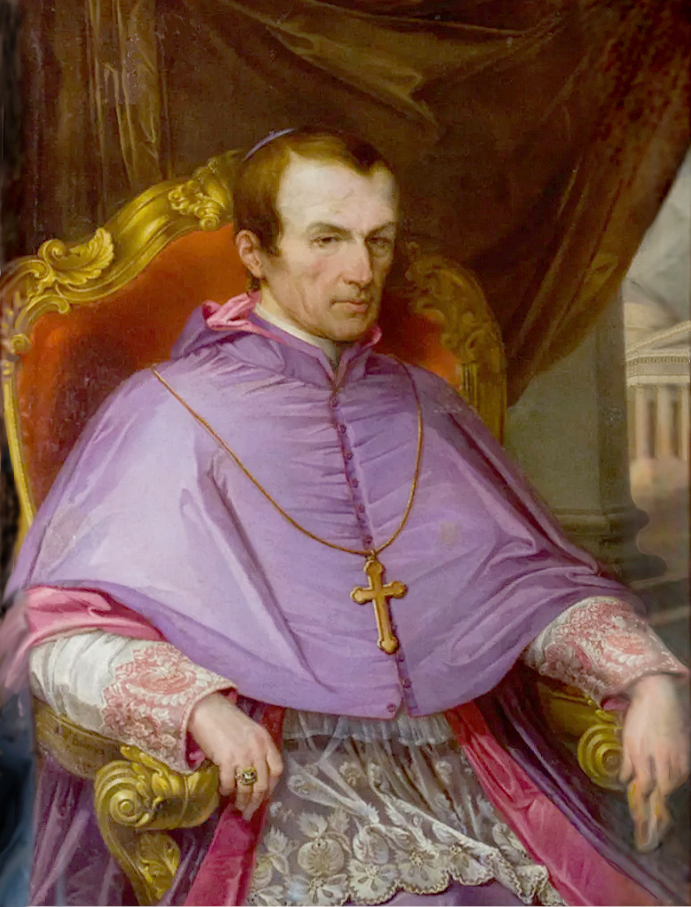
Bishop Giovanni Battista Sartori.

A small group settled in Crespano del Grappa, but it deserves to be remembered for being the birthplace of the remarkable Giovanni Battista Sartori (1775-1858), bishop of Mindo and papal counselor. This group was descended from the original Roana group that had moved to Bassano for some time, and then to Crespano, being included in the Bassano nobility in 1760 by decree of the Doge of Venice. Through his mother, Giovanni Battista was a half-brother of the celebrated sculptor Antonio Canova, making valuable contributions as his secretary and fac-totum to the promotion of his artistic career. He and Canova were responsible for recovering a precious art treasure confiscated by Napoleon in Italy. After Canova's death, Giovanni took up permanent residence in Possagno, where, as his universal heir, he completed the construction of the Temple of Canova and, with the rich artistic legacy left by his brother, founded the Museo Canova and benefited various museums in Bassano del Grappa, Florence, Parma, Piacenza, Treviso, Venice and Asolo. The bishop was a man of vast culture, a reputed commentator on Greek and Latin authors, and translator of Greek tragedies and Aramaic texts. He also sponsored, from his own resources, the renovation of churches and the construction of schools, roads, bridges, fountains and other public works in Possagno and Crespano, made financial endowments to various orphanages and asylums, donated important coin collections to many museums, and collections of manuscripts and rare books to the seminaries of Treviso and Padua. For his merits, he was awarded the titles of honorary citizen of Bassano and Commander of the Order of the Iron Crown.

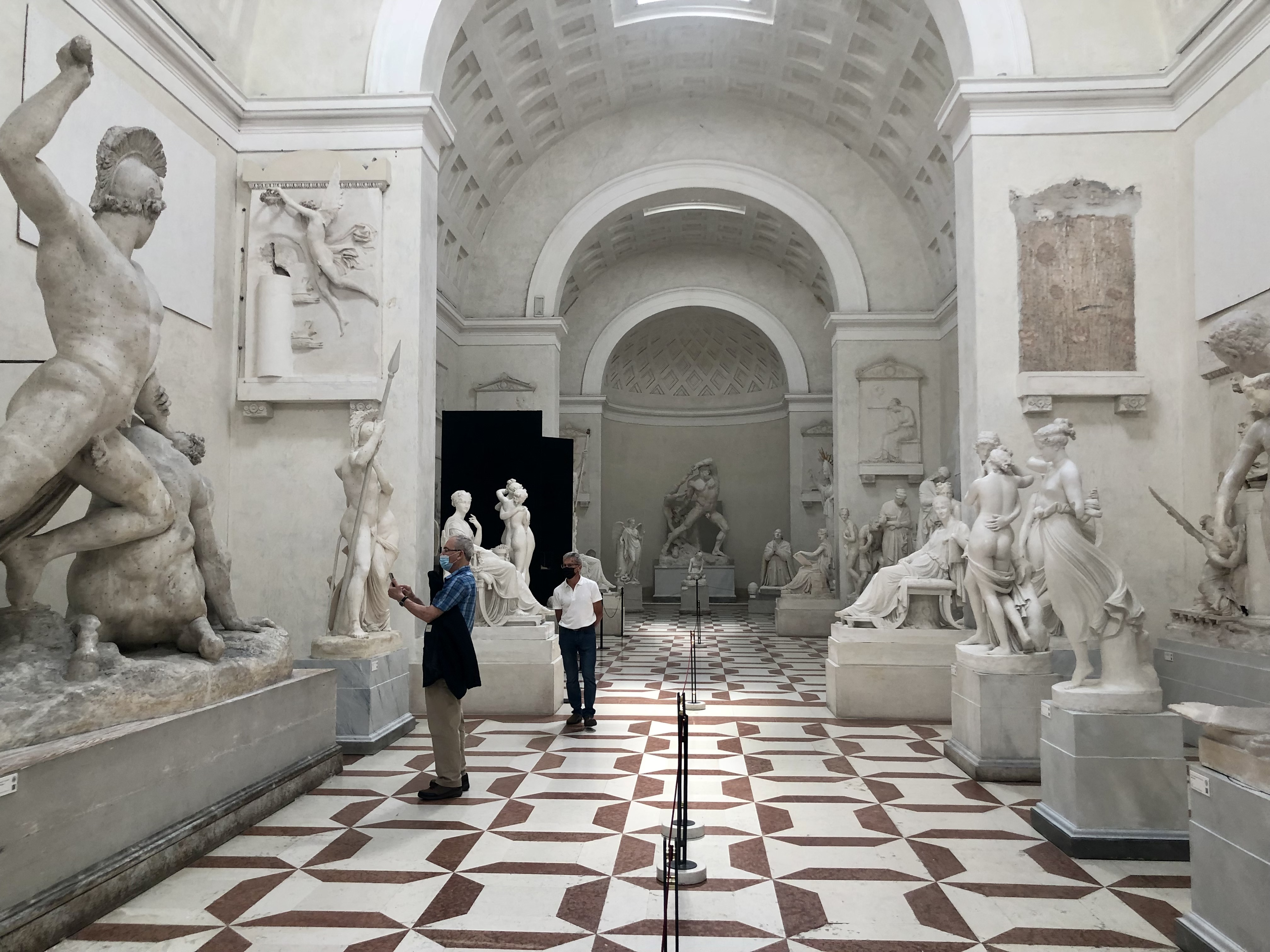
Interior of the Museo Canova.

As heir, the bishop left his only niece, Antonietta Sartori Bianchi, who received from her uncle an important collection of Canova's works. She collaborated in the organization of the Museo Canova, participated in the creation and was a tireless collaborator of the Institute of Regular Clerics of the Schools of Charity of Possagno, conceived by her second husband, Count Filippo Canal, and generously financed by Sartori. She was praised by Domenico Villa, archpriest of Bassano, as having "rare qualities of mind and heart", and by Laura Roberti-Lugo, who called her a "most cultured lady" when she dedicated to Antonietta a volume of chronicles in the form of epistles by her late husband, the literary Ambrogio Lugo, published in 1868. When she died, around 1874, Antonietta left a legacy in her will of one hundred thousand lire for the foundation, in Crespano, of an institute for poor children born in Crespano and Possagno, which came to be legally constituted on May 6, 1880, under the name Opera Pia Bianchi-Canal.

=== Primiero ===
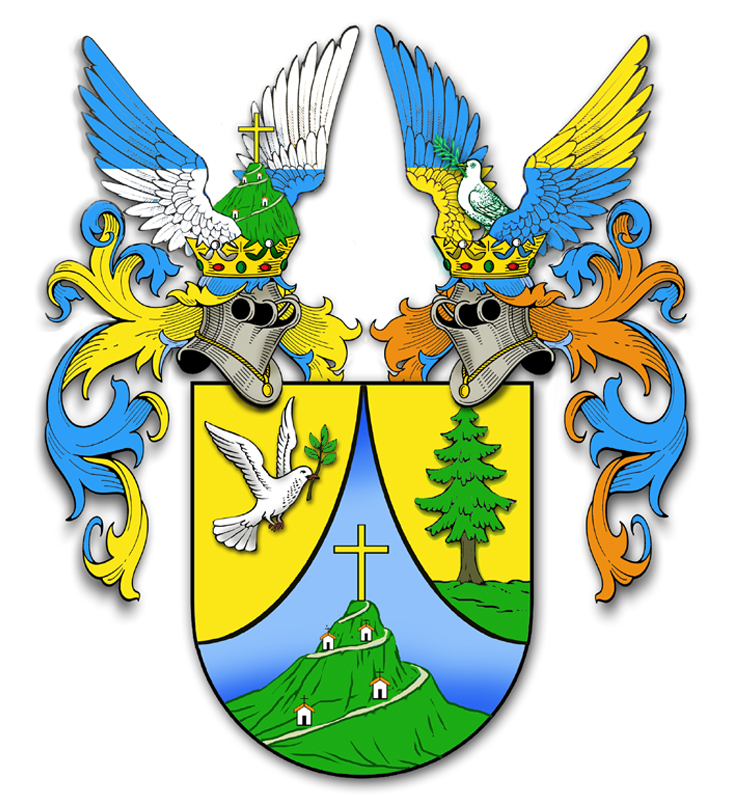
Coat of arms of the Montecroce knights.

In the 16th century, Fiera di Primiero was situated on the border between the county of Tyrol and the Republic of Venice, and maintained an official Tyrolean office for granting customs duties and licenses for the exploitation of the extensive forests of the region. As a result, the village attracted a large number of merchants, entrepreneurs and loggers. In addition, the access it had to the Cismon and Brenta rivers made it a favorable route for high-volume trade. These advantages were exploited by Antonio and Nicolò de Valstagna, who bought forests there for the timber trade and established sawmills, supervising the business personally.

In the 18th century, the engineer Fioravante, founder of a dynasty of notaries and knights, stands out. Antonio, Fioravante's son, was a notary in Pieve di Soligo, and Solighetto, in the passage from the 18th to the 19th century, Giovanni Battista and Giovanni Maria were notaries in Tarzo. Giuseppe was dean of the Church of Primiero. Augusto was a malacologist, geometer, architect, and as a royal engineer, he worked for the construction of the Ivrea-Aosta and Brindisi-Lecce railroads in the mid-nineteenth century. At the end of the 19th century, Lina made an important compilation of material on the history of mining in the Primiero area.

Virginia Maria Teresa (1844-1879), daughter of Federico Sartori and Amalia Paternò, showed interest in the poor and in the religious vocation from a young age, taking the religious habit in the convent of the Daughters of Charity of Trento and then joining the Servite Order in 1867; from 1870, she collaborated in youth groups and in the installation of the Daughters of the Sacred Heart of Jesus in Primiero. She maintained a strict personal discipline and was known for her great virtue and charity, dedicating herself to various mortifications; she left writings of mystical inclination, as well as a didactic method for spiritual improvement. Several graces and cures are attributed to her, and she is popularly called a saint.

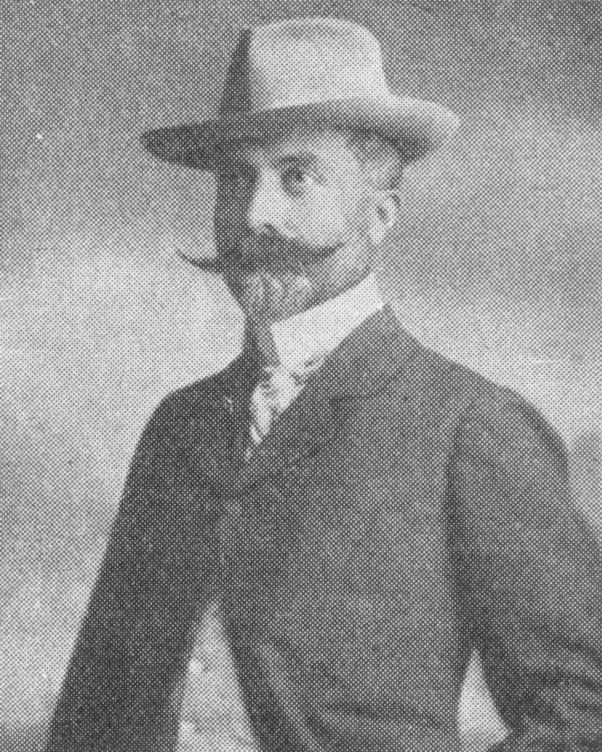
Knight Tullio Sartori-Montecroce.

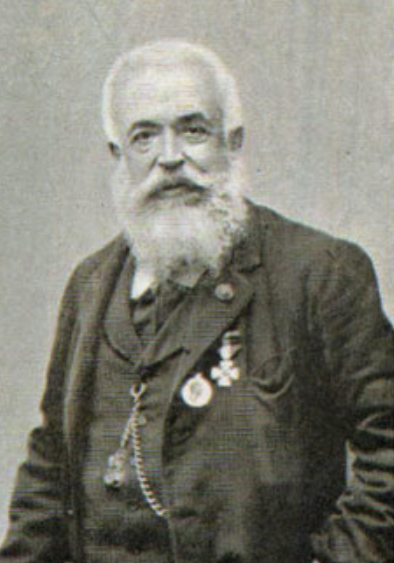
Knight Luigi Sartori.

In 1797, the notary Francesco Antonio was deputy general of the commune and deputy of the valley of Primiero, and from 1809 to 1813, he was district deputy. Giovanni, son of Francesco Antonio, born in 1808, studied law in Innsbruck and joined the Austrian imperial service, being appointed deputy of the District and Criminal Justice of Primiero. Later, he became imperial counselor, director of the Governmental Department for the Italian Tyrol, and deputy of the Diet of Innsbruck for the district of Fiemme, Fassa, and Primiero. Loyal to the Austrian empire, which dominated this area at the time, but also to his ethnic origins, he fought for the creation of an Italian-language university in Innsbruck. Angelo Ara considered him one of the most significant examples of this dual Austro-Italian loyalty among the state bureaucracy of his time. He was appointed hereditary knight of the Order of the Iron Crown, with the Sartori de Montecroce predicate for his relevant services. He convinced the Diet to build a road to bypass the blockade of the Rolle Pass, which had left Primiero isolated; in honor of this initiative, the community named a district Montecroce.

His son, the knight Tullio Sartori-Montecroce (1862-1905), was born in Innsbruck and pursued a legal career. He served briefly as a public administrator in Trieste, and in 1895, was appointed lecturer and extraordinary professor of Canon Law, Germanic Law, and Austrian Constitutional History at the Italian University of Trieste. Later, he taught Germanic Law and Austrian Constitutional History at the University of Innsbruck, where he also became dean of the Chair of Italian Jurisprudence. He devoted much effort to the founding of an Italian university in Austria and left several works on the history of law, such as: Un progetto d'erezione di una Università a Trento nel XVI secolo (1899), Di un tentativo dei giureconsulti trentini di ottenere il privilegio di conferire la laurea (1900), Geschichte des landschaftlichen Steuerwesens in Tirol, von K. Maximilian bis Maria Theresia (1902), Corso di storia del diritto pubblico germanico (posthumous publication, 1908) and the highly praised La Comunità di Fiemme e il suo diritto statutario (1891). Baron Tullio II Sartori-Montecroce studied at the Ludwig-Maximilians-Universität München, the University of Vienna, and the University of Innsbruck, worked as an engineer, and in 1926, married Anne Pearson Hall, an American citizen from a prominent Connecticut family.

Knight Luigi Sartori, inventor of various types of hives and mobile combs, is also from Primiero and received several distinctions and medals and a diamond jewel in the shape of a bee from the Emperor of Austria. According to Fontana & Angeli, "Sartori was one of the first beekeepers at the international level to codify and rationalize the breeding of queens.". He left three treatises that have become reference works: Trattato di apicultura razionale (1866); L'apicoltura in Italia. Manuale tecnico-pratico-industriale per la coltivazione razionale del mellifero insetto col favo mobile e col favo fisso (1878, in collaboration with Andrea de Rauschenfels), and L'arte di coltivare le api ossia conferenze apistiche teorico-pratiche (1900).

=== Brazil ===
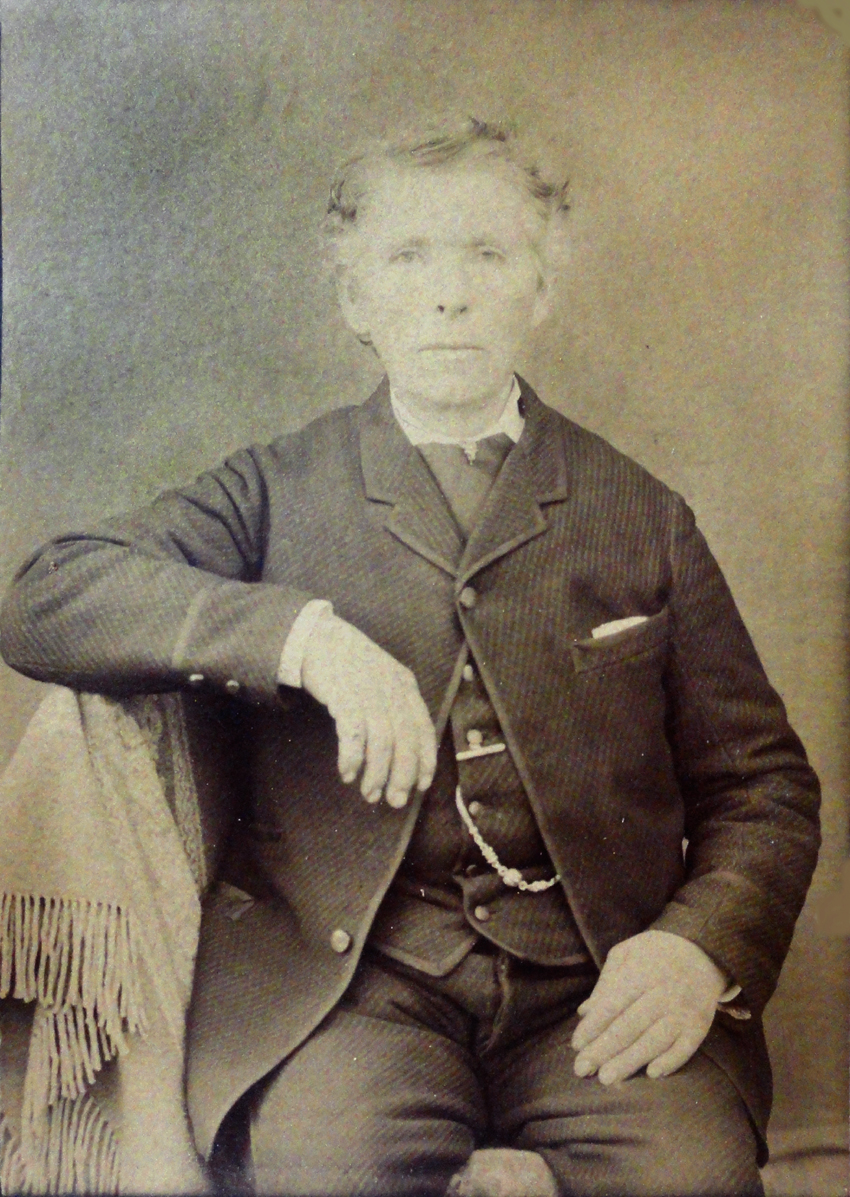
Salvador Sartori.

The Brazilian branch was founded by Salvador Sartori, born in Vicenza in 1827, a road contractor, son of Angelo Sartori and Giacomina Toffolon. Married to Angela Zancaner, he settled with his wife, parents and siblings in Cornuda, and from there he left for Caxias do Sul with Angela and eleven children, plus some siblings and their families, in the middle of the city's foundation period, arriving on February 20, 1879. In a few years, he set up a large business in the Dante Alighieri square, the center of the emerging town, where he began to live. From 1883 on, his business expanded with a tannery, a bodega, a shoe store, a butcher shop, and wine production. He achieved recognition as a civil and religious leader, was a fabricator of the first Mother Church and co-founder of the Church of San Pellegrino, one of the founders and first leaders of the directory of the Rio-grandense Republican Party, and a member of the first Governmental Board and of the first Council. He was greeted by Lorenzo Cichero as "benefactor" and "one of the pioneers of the foundation of Caxias", and by Mário Gardelin as "personality of great importance in the life of Caxias", with "many and successful descendants", being the patriarch of a family that, in the words of Angelo Costamilan, would be part of "the finest flower of Caxias society". Several descendants can be cited.

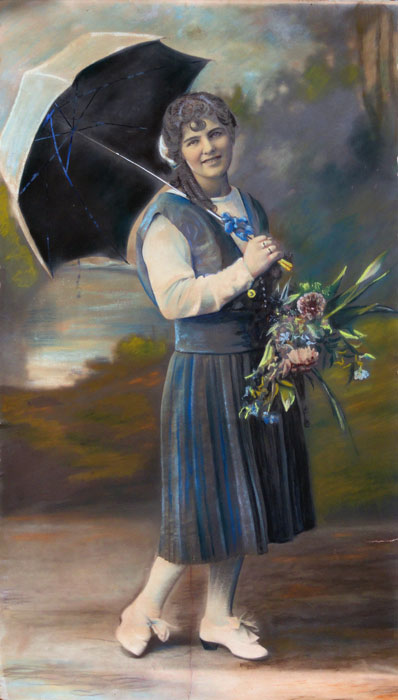
Ida Sartori Paternoster. Large photo-painting by Júlio Calegari.

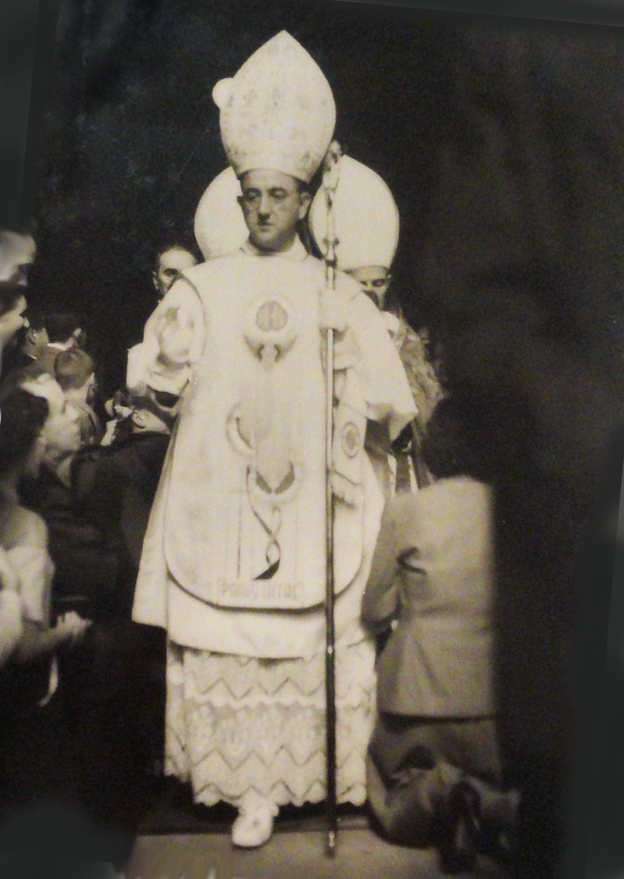
Bishop Luis Victor Sartori.

Carolina, one of the founders and counselor of the Associação Damas de Caridade, a charitable entity of relevant trajectory, and founder and maintainer of the Pompeia Hospital. Amalia, founder of the first chapel and a great benefactor of the Church of San Pellegrino. Ida, an honorary member of Esporte Clube Juventude, one of the founders and honorary president of the cultural group Éden Juventudista, considered a woman ahead of her time and one of the most notable female personalities of her generation in Caxias do Sul. Attilio, one of the founders of the Apollo Theater in Caxias, and later, a coffee farmer in São Paulo, where he left descendants.

Ludovico was a merchant, landowner, captain of the National Guard, and fabricator of the Cathedral of Caxias. He was also one of the founders of the Sociedade Caxiense de Mútuo Socorro and Câmara de Indústria, Comércio e Serviços. The latter where he also served as director. His son Honorino was a journalist, one of the founders of Esporte Clube Juventude, where he was an athlete. Later in his life, Honorino became board member, president, honorary member, and benefactor of the club.

Alberto was one of the largest wine exporters in Caxias, owner of several hotels, lieutenant in the National Guard, and sub-intendent in the 3rd District. His son Luís Victor was the coadjutor chaplain of the Cathedral of Caxias, curate of the Cathedral of Porto Alegre, chaplain of the Church of the Divine Holy Spirit, of the Providência Asylum and the Carmelite Monastery, director of the Military Department of Catholic Action, and later bishop of Santa Maria, where he was an important community leader and an active figure in the articulation of the 1964 military coup, one of the pioneers of radio broadcasting in Santa Maria, one of the founders of the Law School (later incorporated to Federal University of Santa Maria), and builder of the Saint Joseph Diocesan Seminary. Remembered by João Spadari Adami as a "notable orator and sacred writer", when he died, he was praised by the leader of the MDB bench in the Legislative Assembly as "an exceptional figure whose services to our people will never be forgotten for the much they enriched the spiritual patrimony of our state".

Paulo Pedro was one of the founders and president of the Associação dos Cronistas Esportivos of Porto Alegre, judge at the Sports Court of Justice, editor of the newspapers Hoje and Jornal do Dia, president of the Federação Atlética Riograndense, vice-president and counselor of the Associação Riograndense de Imprensa, director of the Department of Inspection of Public Entertainment Services, a censorship agency during the dictatorship, and secretary-general of the Federation of Commercial Associations.

Pedro Luiz has a PhD in Mineralogy and Petrology, is a full professor and head of the Center of Natural and Exact Sciences of the Department of Geosciences at the Federal University of Santa Maria, member of the editorial board of the journal Disciplinarum Scientia, scientific advisor of the International Symposium on Granites and Associated Mineralizations, and author of an extensive scientific bibliography.

== See also ==
- Italian Brazilians
