= Frieri =

Frieri is an Italian surname. Notable people with the surname include:

- Ernesto Frieri (born 1985), Colombian baseball player
- Tiziano Frieri (born 1944), Italian footballer

== See also ==
- Frier (disambiguation)
