= Andrea dei Mozzi =

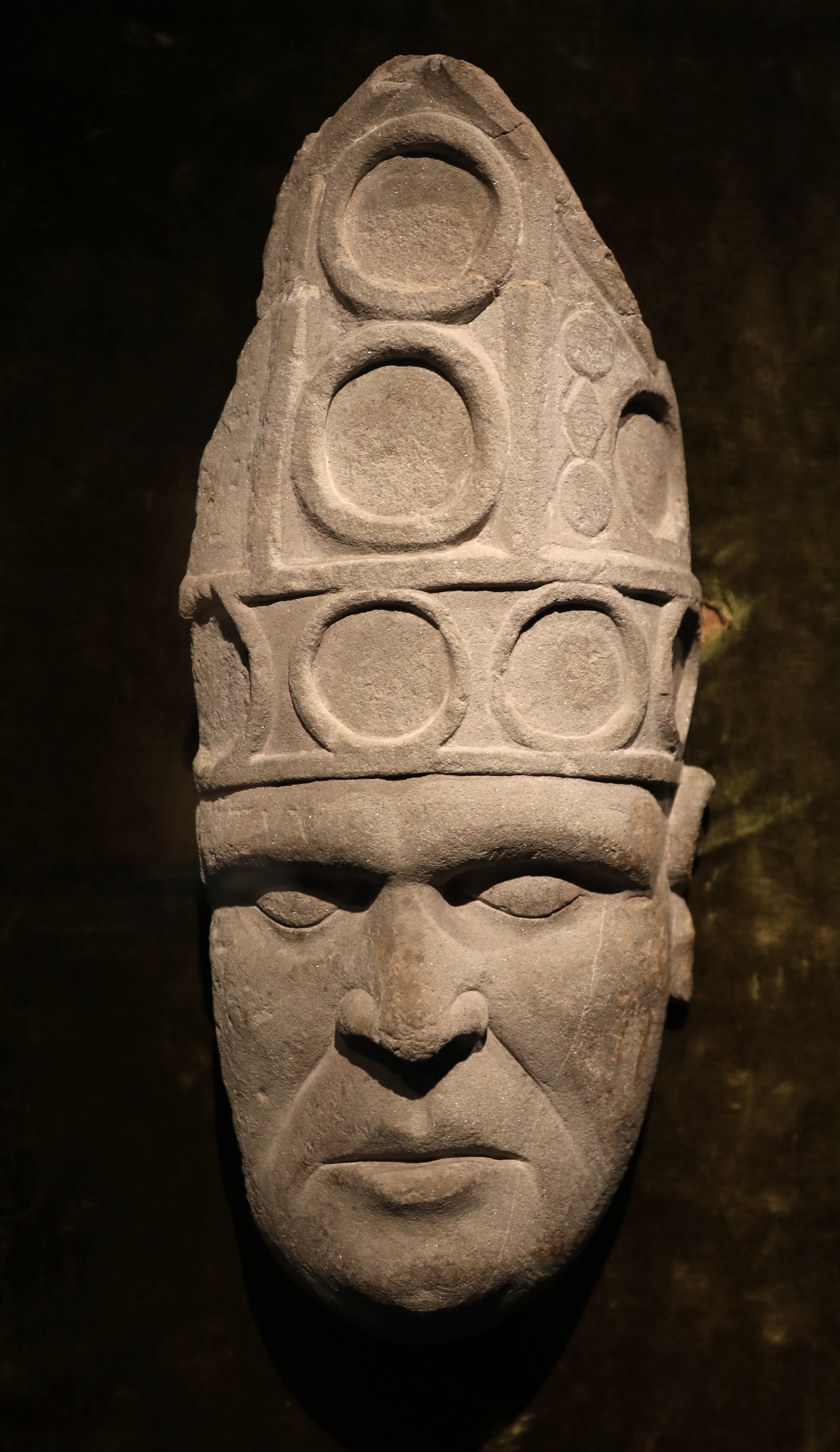
Head of Andrea de' Mozzi, from his funerary monument in San Gregorio della Pace, Florence (now in private collection)

Andrea dei Mozzi (died 1296) was an Italian bishop, from the Mozzi family of bankers. He was a papal chaplain, for Pope Alexander IV and Pope Gregory IX. He was then appointed as Archbishop of Florence in 1287. He was transferred by Pope Boniface VIII to Vicenza, in 1295, in a scandal that made him a character in Dante's The Inferno.

He had a nephew of the same name.

== See also ==
- Sartori family
