= Scolari =

Scolari is an Italian surname, and may refer to:

- Fred Scolari, American basketball player
- Giuseppe Scolari, Venetian artist of the 16th century, notably in woodcut
- Luiz Felipe Scolari, Brazilian football coach
- Peter Scolari, American actor
- Pipo of Ozora, also known as Filippo Scolari or Lo Scolari
- Pope Clement III, born as Paulino Scolari
- Norma Scolari, Mexican painter
- Rosa Chiarina Scolari, Italian nun who helped the Italian Resistance in World War II

== See also ==
- Scolari's Food and Drug, a supermarket chain
