= Castegnero Nanto =

- Comune
- Comune di Castegnero Nanto
- Nanto within the Province of Vicenza

- Location within Italy Location within Veneto
- Coordinates: 45°27′N 11°35′E
- Country: Italy
- Region: Veneto
- Province: Vicenza (VI)
- Frazioni: Anzolin, Bosco di Nanto, Ca' Nova, Castegnero, Cazzola, Ponte, Ponte di Nanto, Priare, Prietta, Sambugaro, Torretta, Vegre, Villaganzerla

Area
  - Total: 26 km^{2} (10 sq mi)
- Elevation: 20 m (66 ft)

Population (1 January 2026)
  - Total: 5,853
  - Density: 230/km^{2} (580/sq mi)
- Time zone: UTC+1 (CET)
  - Summer (DST): UTC+2 (CEST)
- Postal code: 36020

Castegnero Nanto is a town and comune in the province of Vicenza, Veneto, northern Italy. From February 21, 2026, the following municipalities were formed by merging Castegnero and Nanto.

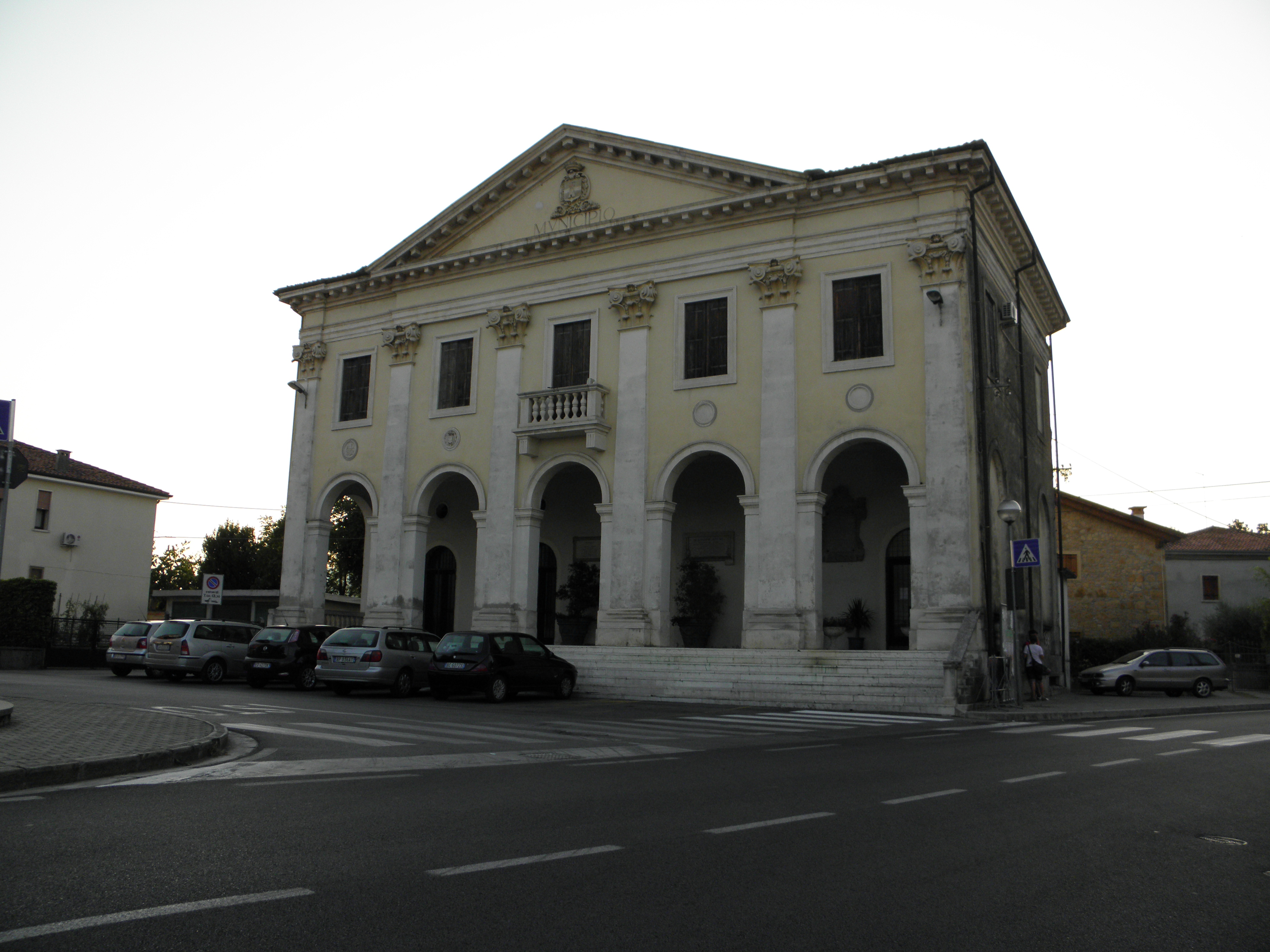
Town hall at Ponte di Nanto

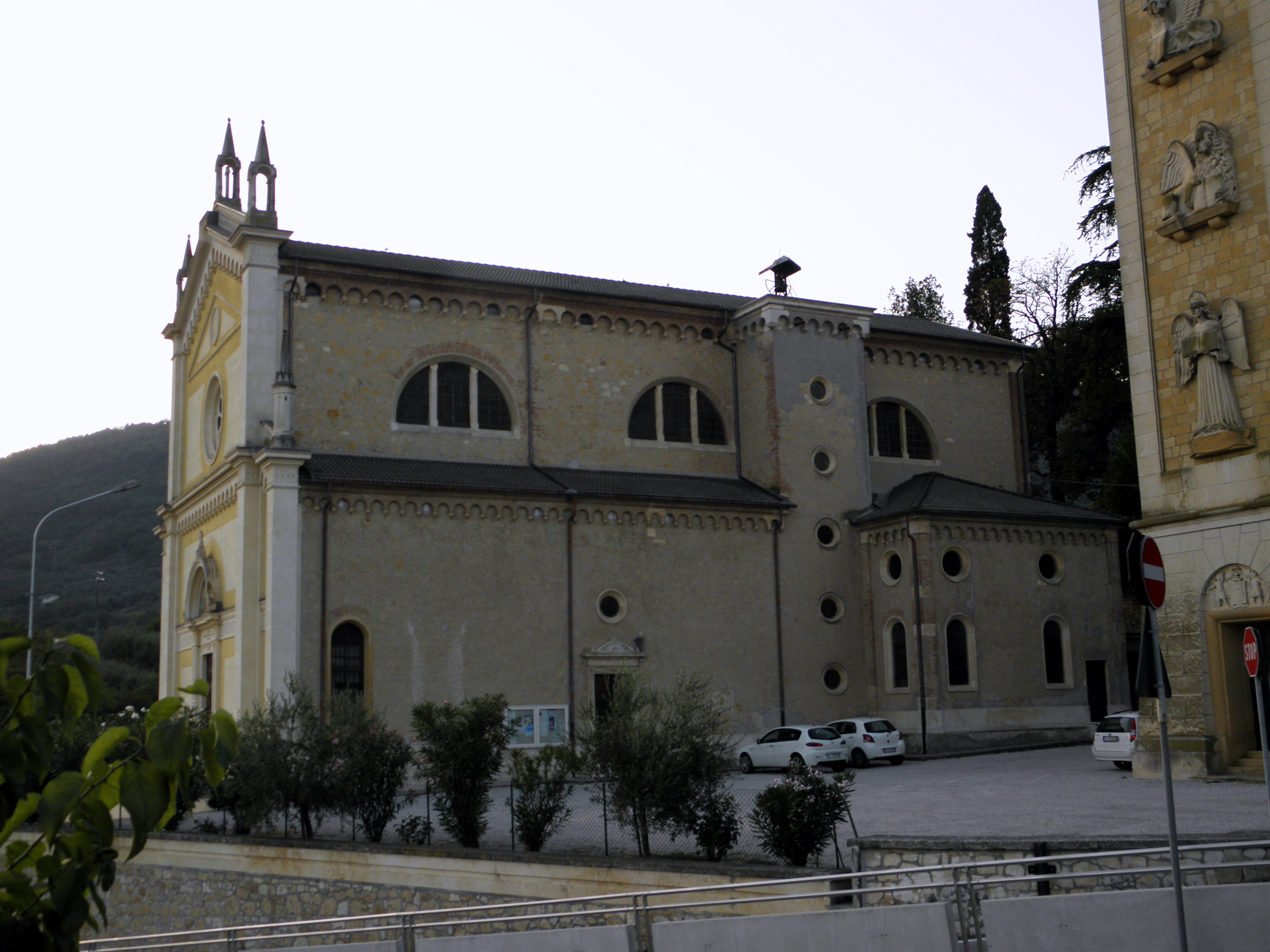
The church of Santa Maria Annunziata

== Personalities ==
- Antonio Bailetti (b. 1937, Nanto), former professional road bicycle racer
- Tiziano Frieri (b. 1944, Nanto), footballer
