= Rosa Chiarina Scolari =

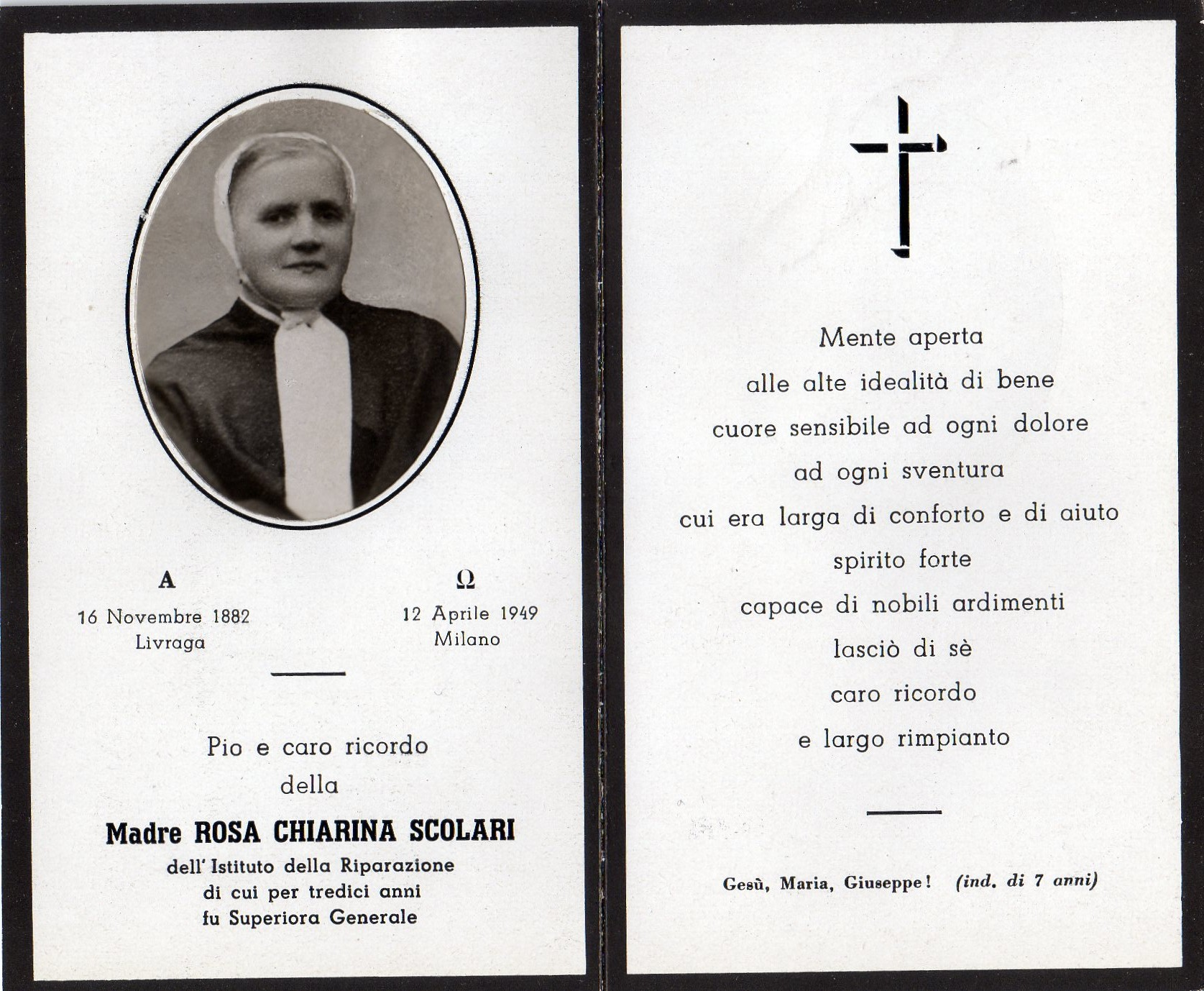
- Born: 16 November 1882; Livraga, Italy
- Died: 12 April 1949 (aged 66); Milan, Italy
- Burial place: Monumental Cemetery of Milan
- Occupation: Mother Superior
- Known for: Resistance member
- Parents: Lodovico Scolari (father); Regina Crespi (mother)

Rosa Chiarina Scolari (Livraga, 16 November 1882 – Milan, 12 April 1949) was an Italian nun who helped the Italian resistance movement in Milan during the final days of World War II.

== Biography ==
Born to Lodovico Scolari and Regina Crespi in 1882 in Livraga, Italy, Rosa entered a convent and became a Catholic nun. For 13 years she was Mother Superior of the Institute of Reparation in Corso Magenta in Milan, commonly known as the "House of misguided girls."

In the last days of Italy's War of Liberation, Scolari was asked for hospitality by the military general command of the Voluntary Corps of Freedom (CVL). Despite her objection that this was a monastery for women, it became the new headquarters of the CVL. From this hidden position directives were given for a general insurrection against the Nazi-fascist army occupiers. According to Bigi, "Hardly anyone knew that this convent served as the headquarters of the CVL during the final April uprising in northern Italy."

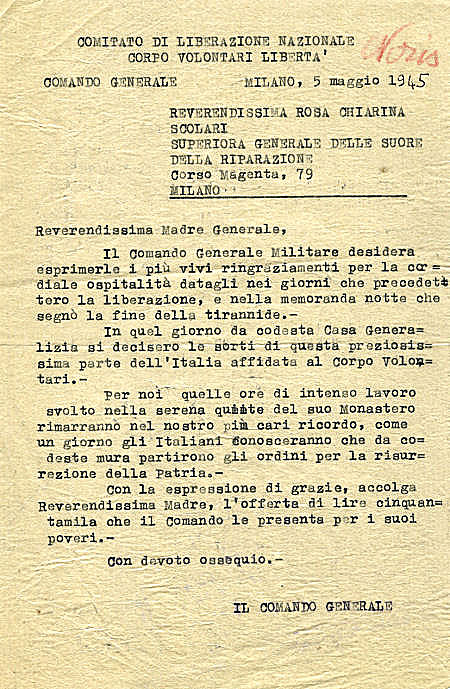
Letter from the General Command of the National Liberation Committee to Mother Rosa Chiarina Scolari (1945).

Immediately after Italy's Liberation, on 5 May 1945, General Raffaele Cadorna, who then commanded the CVL, sent a letter of thanks to the nun. Italian parliamentarian Enrico Mattei spoke extensively of this letter in a report to the 1st National Congress on 24–28 April 1946. In part, the letter read,

Most Reverend Mother General, The Military General Commander wishes to express its warmest thanks for the cordial hospitality given to him in the days preceding the liberation, and in the memorable night that marked the end of the tyranny. For us those hours of intense work done in the serene quiet of this monastery will remain in our dearest memory, as one day the Italians will know that the orders for the resurrection of the homeland departed from these walls.

The letter was lost for decades until a copy was discovered among the personal papers of Giovanni Battista Stucchi, one of the members of the General Command of the CVL, by his daughter.

Scolari died in Milan on 12 April 1949, and she is buried in the Aliprandi chapel in Milan's Monumental Cemetery.
