= Tiziano Frieri =

Italian footballer

Tiziano Frieri (born 22 December 1944 in Nanto) is an Italian retired footballer. He played as a striker. He is the son of the guardian of Stadio Romeo Menti. He played for Lanerossi Vicenza youth teams and then in lower series for Juve Stabia, Puteolana, Marsala, Lecce and Acireale.

== Career ==
- 1958-1964 L.R. Vicenza ? (70)
- 1964-1965 A.C. Schio ? (10)
- 1965-1967 Juve Stabia ? (28)
- 1967-1968 Puteolana ? (23)
- 1968-1969 Marsala ? (17)
- 1969 Como ? (0)
- 1969-1971 Lecce 32 (18)
- 1971-1973 Acireale ? (26)
- 1973-1975 Nuorese ? (15)
