= Carraro =

Carraro is an Italian surname. Notable people with the surname include:

- Aldana Carraro (1994–2015), Argentine female artistic gymnast
- Daniela Carraro (born 1985), Brazilian sports shooter
- Elena Carraro (born 2001), Italian hurdler
- Emanuela Setti Carraro (1950–1982), Italian nurse and wife of General Carlo Alberto dalla Chiesa
- Federico Carraro (born 1992), Italian footballer
- Flavio Roberto Carraro (1932–2022), Italian Roman Catholic prelate
- Franco Carraro (1939), Italian sport manager and politician
- Giuseppe Carraro (1899–1980), Italian Roman Catholic prelate
- Marco Carraro (born 1998), Italian footballer
- Martina Carraro (born 1993), Italian swimmer
- Massimo Carraro (born 1959), Italian university professor, entrepreneur and politician
- Tino Carraro (1910–1995), Italian actor

== See also ==
- Carraro Agritalia, Italian tractor manufacturer
