= George Washington (Canova) =

Sculpture by Antonio Canova

- Giorgio Washington (Italian)
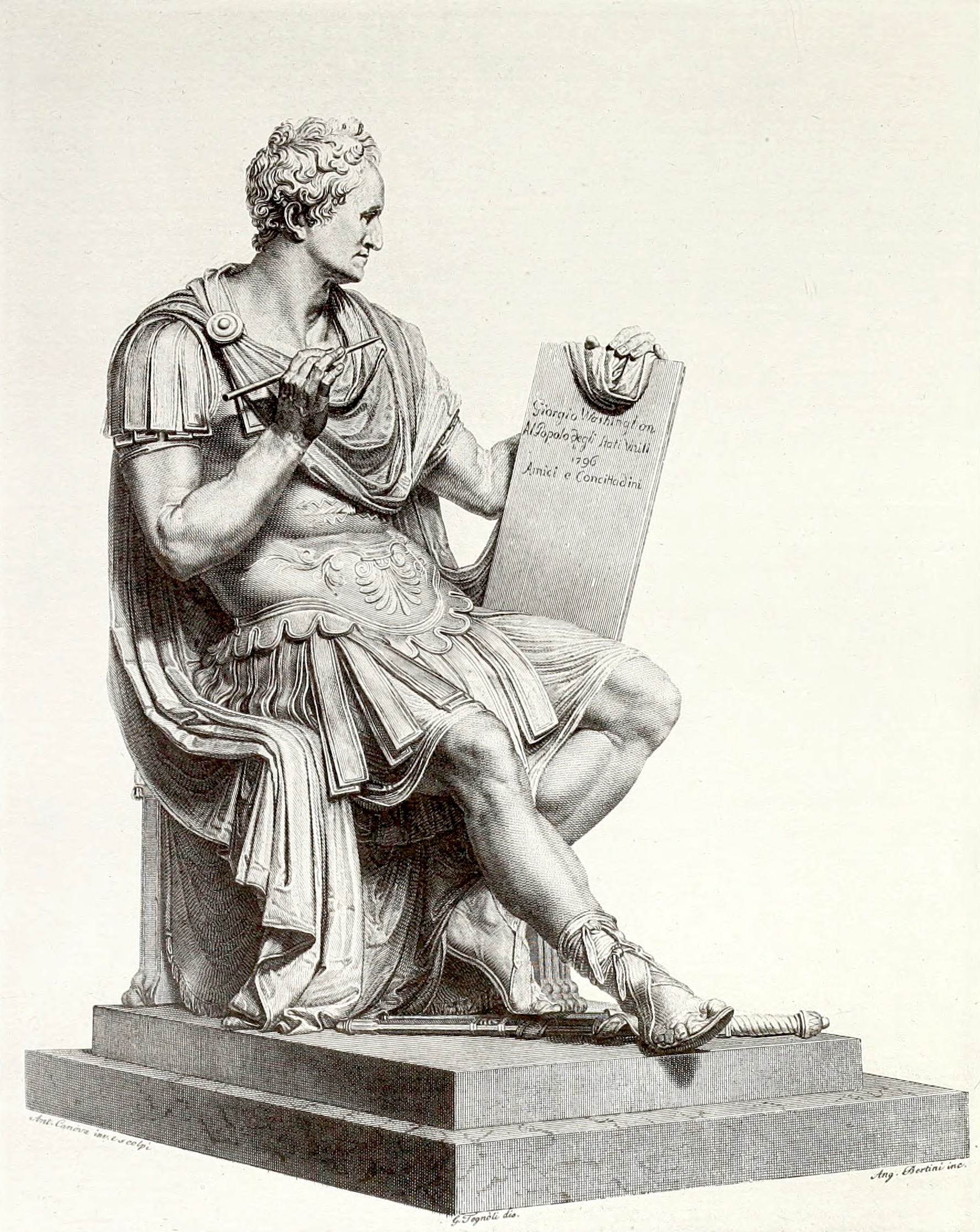
- Engraving by Bertini of Canova's statue of George Washington
- Year: 1820
- Medium: marble
- Location: Raleigh, United States
- Commissioner: North Carolina

George Washington was a life-size marble statue of George Washington, done in the style of a Roman general, by the Venetian-Italian Neoclassical sculptor Antonio Canova. Commissioned by the State of North Carolina in 1815, it was completed in 1820 and installed in the rotunda of the North Carolina State House on December 24, 1821. The building and the statue were destroyed by fire on June 21, 1831. This work was the only one created by Canova for the United States.

== History ==
In December 1815, the House of Commons and the Senate of North Carolina unanimously resolved to commission a full-length statue of Washington. Governor William Miller, with the assistance and recommendation of Thomas Jefferson, determined that Canova should be the sculptor and that Thomas Appleton, American consul in Livorno, Italy, should handle the negotiations. Washington had died in 1799, and Jefferson recommended that Canova use the marble bust of Washington by Giuseppe Ceracchi as a model for the head; Appleton owned a plaster copy.

Canova started work on the statue at his studio in Rome in 1817, completing several sketches and maquettes (also described as modellos or bozzettos). He finished the statue in 1820. Governor Miller had requested a United States Navy vessel to transport it from Italy. Commodore William Bainbridge, commander of USS Columbus, delivered it to Boston on July 22, 1821. The statue ultimately arrived in Raleigh, North Carolina, on December 24 and was installed in the rotunda of the state house as part of an official ceremony, attended by Governor Jesse Franklin and the legislature. Colonel William Polk, an officer in the American Revolutionary War, addressed the audience in the dedication speech, comparing Canova to Michelangelo and praising Washington.

Canova did not see the statue installed in North Carolina: he died in Venice in 1822. In March 1825, the Marquis de Lafayette viewed the statue and was reported to state that "the likeness was so much better than he expected to see."

Following the major fire of May 29, 1831, in Fayetteville, the state decided to protect the wooden roof of the state house with zinc sheets. On June 21, while working to fireproof the building, workers accidentally set the roof on fire while soldering nail heads to the zinc. The resulting destruction of both the state house and Canova's statue was described as an "Awful conflagration!" in The Raleigh Register on June 23.

A plaster replica was sent by the Italian government in 1910 and is on view at the North Carolina Museum of History. A marble copy was sculpted by Romano Vio in 1970, and is displayed in the rotunda of the North Carolina State Capitol, which was built in the same spot as the state house destroyed in 1831.

== Description ==
The statue was made of Carrara marble. Washington is dressed all'antica in ancient Roman military armor and shown seated holding a tablet in his left hand and a quill in his right hand; a modern Cincinnatus drafting his farewell address to the nation. At his feet are a sword and baton.

The following inscription was on the base:

Giorgio Washington
Alla grande Nazione degli Stati Uniti di America
– Antonio Canova

Translation:

George Washington
To the Great Nation of the United States of America
– Antonio Canova

The statue was displayed on a separate pedestal made by Canova's student, Raimondo Trentanove, son of Antonio Trentanove. Trentanove carved four bas-reliefs into the white marble of the pedestal, with each scene depicting an important aspect of Washington's life, as specified by Appleton. The front relief showed the surrender of British General Charles Cornwallis at Yorktown with Washington in victory. The second scene showed his resignation as commander-in-chief of the Continental Army to Congress. The third one his election as President of the United States. The last one showed him with a plow back at his farm at Mount Vernon, like Cincinnatus returning to private life.

== Legacy ==
From May 23 through September 23, 2018, the Frick Collection presented an exhibition, Canova's George Washington, that displayed several of the maquettes used to create the work, including a full-size plaster model, on loan from the Museo Canova in Possagno. The exhibition then traveled to the Museo Canova, where it ran from November 10, 2018 until April 22, 2019.

== Gallery ==
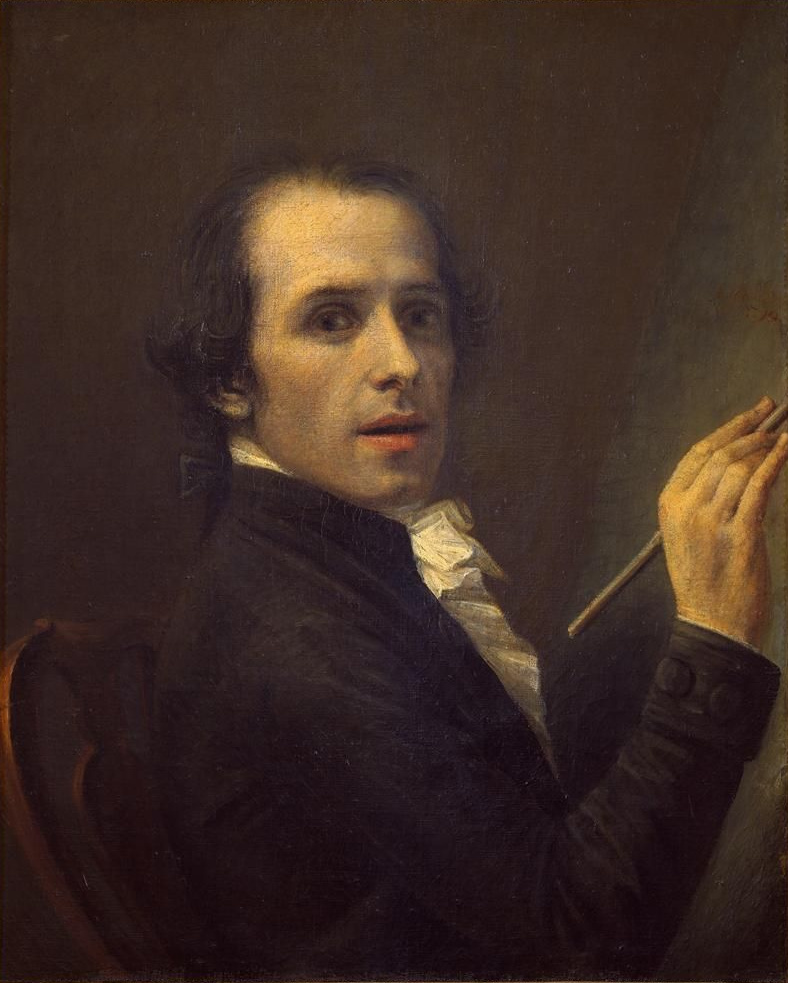
Canova, self-portrait, 1792

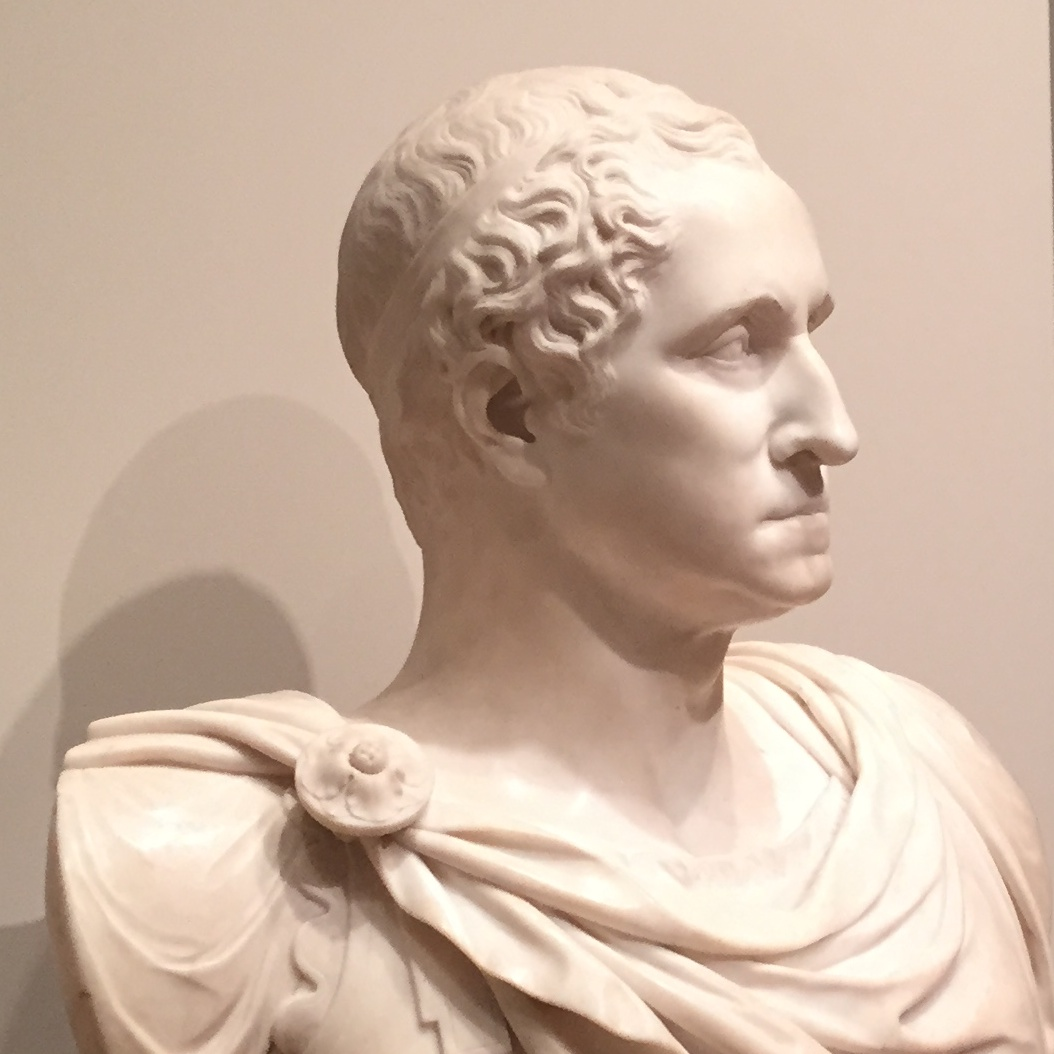
Marble bust of Washington by Giuseppe Ceracchi, 1795

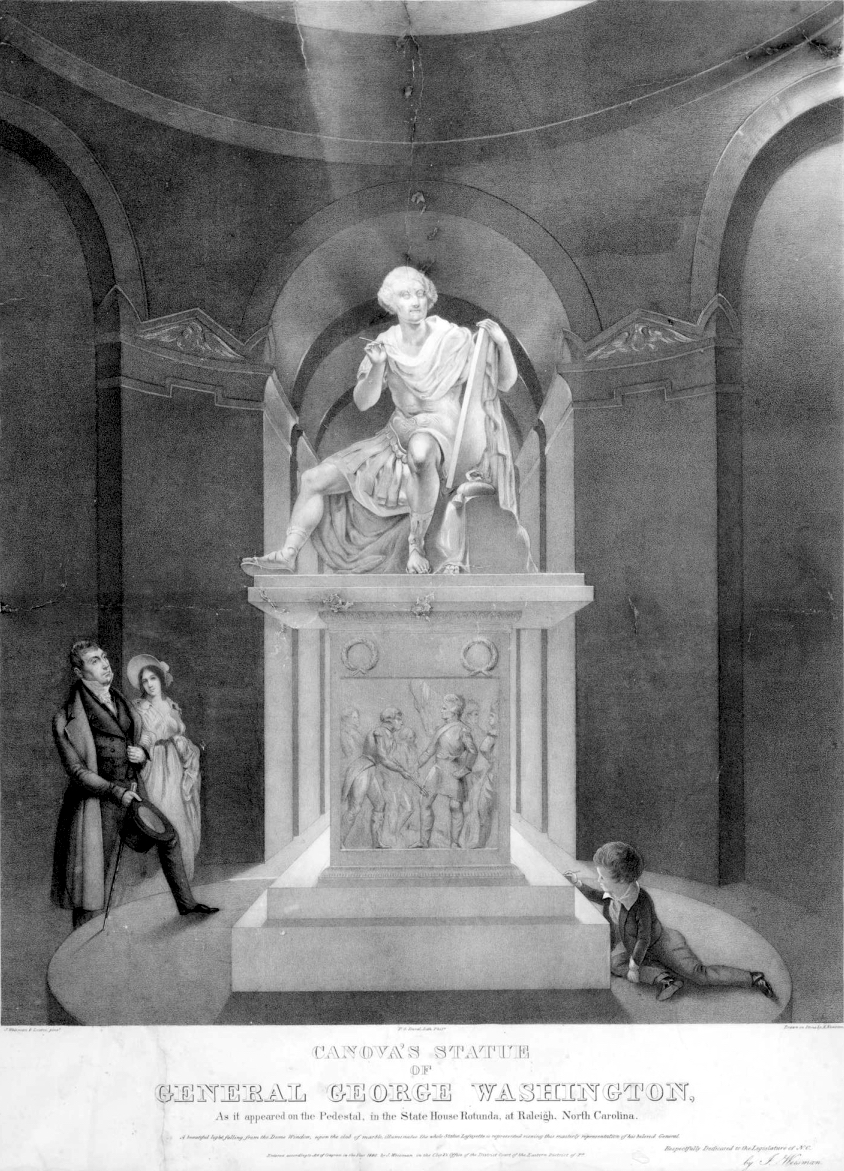
Lithograph of original Statue and pedestal depicted in the rotunda of the North Carolina State House with bas-reliefs by R. Trentanove

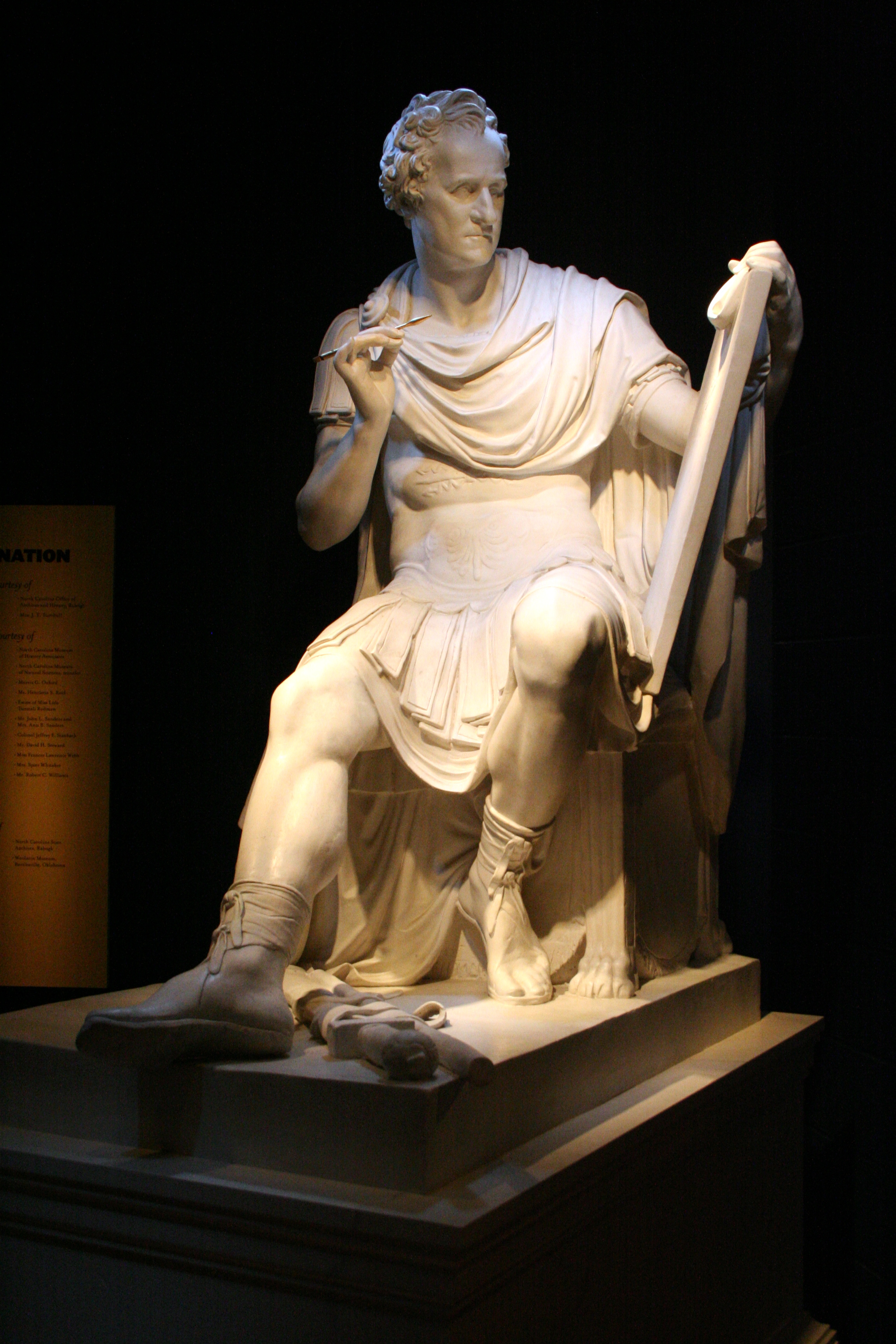
George Washington, plaster replica on display at the North Carolina Museum of History

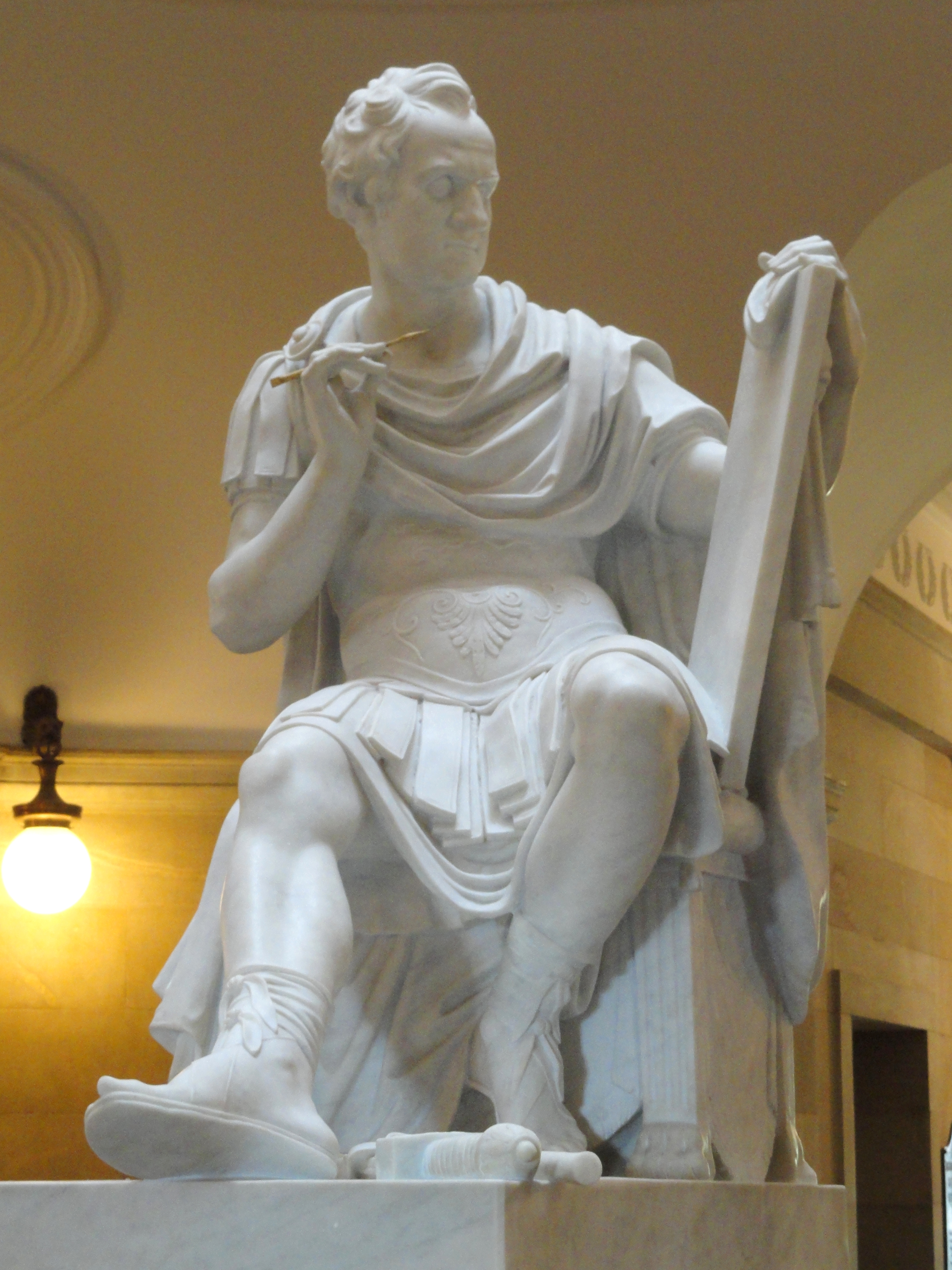
George Washington, copy by Romano Vio in the North Carolina State Capitol

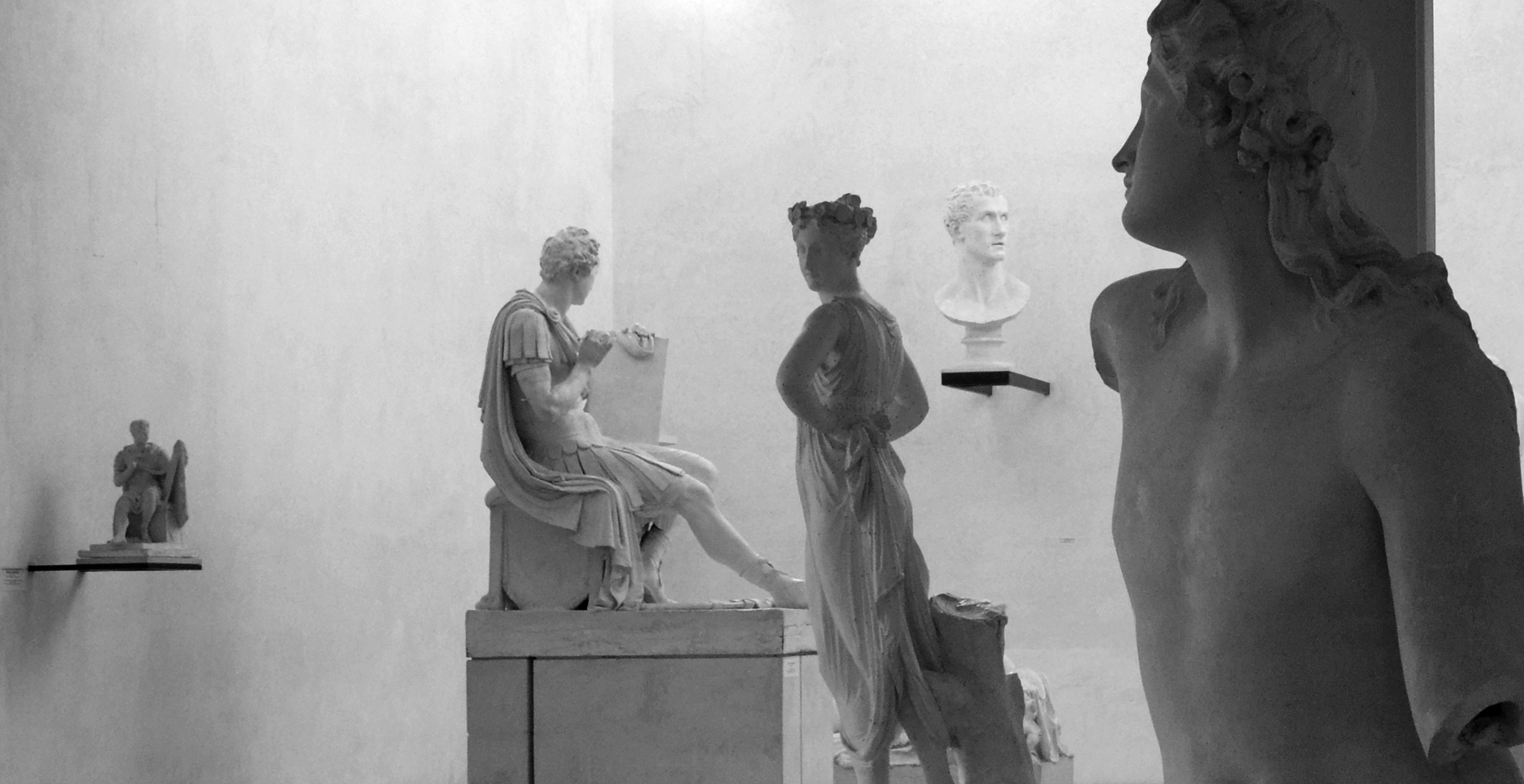
Plaster model at the Museo Canova

== See also ==
- 1820 in art
- George Washington, statue by Horatio Greenough
- George Washington's resignation as commander-in-chief
- Cultural depictions of George Washington
- List of memorials to George Washington
- List of statues of George Washington

== Bibliography ==
- Connor, R.D.W. (1910), Canova's Statue of Washington, The North Carolina Historical Commission, OCLC 1041641544
- Haywood, Marshall DeLancey (1902), Bassett, John Spencer (ed.), "Canova's Statue of Washington", The South Atlantic Quarterly, 1 (3), Durham, North Carolina: Duke University: 278–287, doi:10.1215/00382876-1-3-278, S2CID 258264323
- Salomon, Xavier F.; Beltramini, Guido; Guderzo, Mario (2018), Canova's George Washington, New York: The Frick Collection, ISBN 978-1-911282-17-4, OCLC 1008776014
