= Trentanove =

Trentanove is an Italian surname. Notable people with the surname include:

- Antonio Trentanove (c. 1745–1812), Italian sculptor and stucco-artist
- Gaetano Trentanove (1858–1937), Italian-born American sculptor
