= Museo Canova =

Biographical art museum in Italy

Coordinates: 45.51063°N 11.522968°E

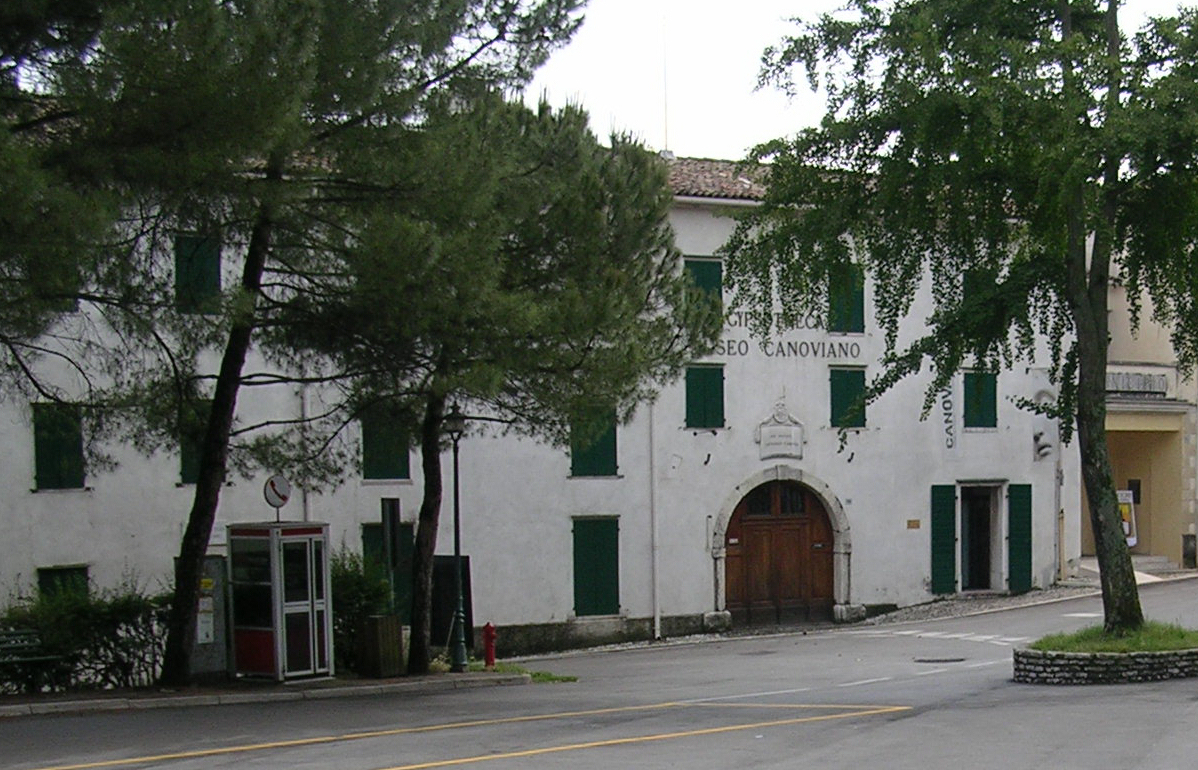
Museo Canova

The Museo Canova is a museum established in 1833 at the birthplace of the Italian sculptor Antonio Canova (1757–1822) in Possagno in the province of Treviso in the Veneto, Italy. The museum is dedicated to the life and work of the sculptor and is composed of several parts.

== The Gipsoteca ==
The Gypsotheca (or gipsoteca), a plaster cast gallery, is housed in a large, basilica-shaped building which displays gypsum models (in fact gipsoteca literally means "collection of chalks"), terracotta sketches, and marbles by the artist. In 1957 the modernist Venetian architect Carlo Scarpa extended a wing of this gallery in order to bathe the semblances in light.

Among the casts in the gipsoteca is the one for Canova's Venus Victrix, or more specifically Pauline Bonaparte as Venus Victrix (1805–1808); originally used as a model for the marble, During the first Battle of Monte Grappa in 1917, a Christmas-time bombing severed the head of the plaster and damaged parts of the hands, feet, and cloth. A 2004 restoration repaired this damage. In 2020, a tourist broke some of the toes as he sat on the plaster while posing for a selfie.

The gipsoteca also holds the modello for Canova's lost George Washington (1820); which was installed in the rotunda of the North Carolina State House in 1821 and destroyed by the structure's collapse brought on by fire in 1831. From 23 May until 23 September 2018 the Frick Collection in New York City presented an exhibition, Canova's George Washington, which displayed the plaster model, on loan from the gipsoteca The exhibition then traveled to the gipsoteca where it ran from 10 November 2018 until 22 April 2019.

== Casa natale di Antonio Canova ==
The other main building is the artist's birthplace "casa natale di Antonio Canova" (the house where he was born), which today contains an art gallery (oils on canvas and tempera), some drawings, the engravingss of the works, and numerous memorabilia.

In 1799 Canova planted a stone pine tree on the site and it still flourishes there in the gardens the museum maintains today.

== See also ==
- List of single-artist museums
