= Raimondo Trentanove =

Raimondo Trentanove (1792 – 1832) was an Italian sculptor, active in the Neoclassical-style.

He was born in Faenza, the son of the sculptor Antonio Trentanove. At the age of 8, he accompanied his father, who served then as custodian at the Academy of Fine Arts of Carrara. There Raimondo studied under Giacomo De Maria and Lorenzo Bartolini. Returning to Faenza in 1814, he was awarded a stipend to study in Rome for three years, where he worked under Canova. Among his works are Amore Sedente and Venus che scherza con Amore. In Rome, he was much sought after for his portrait busts.

== Gallery ==
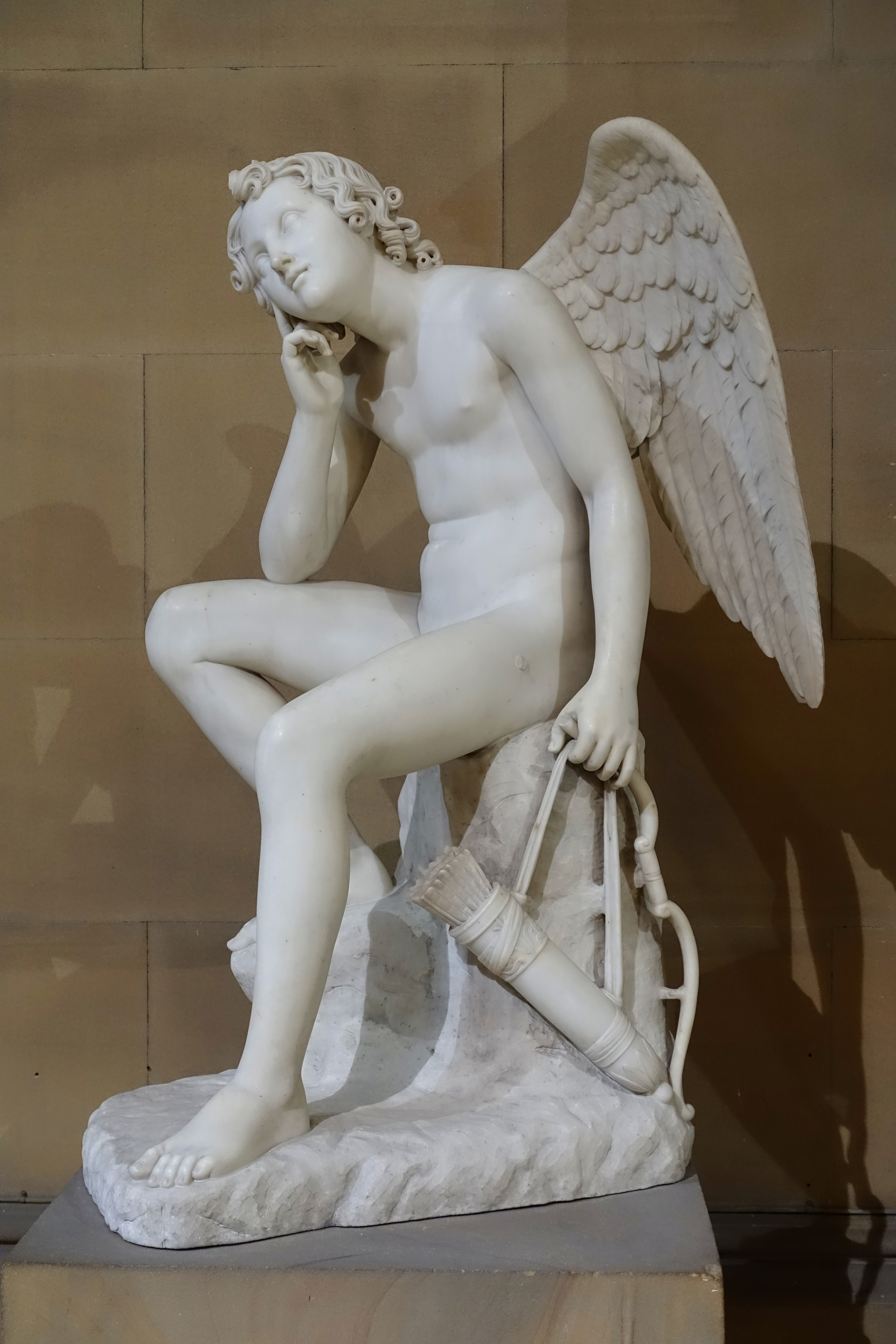
Cupid Resting (1823) at Chatsworth House, Derbyshire

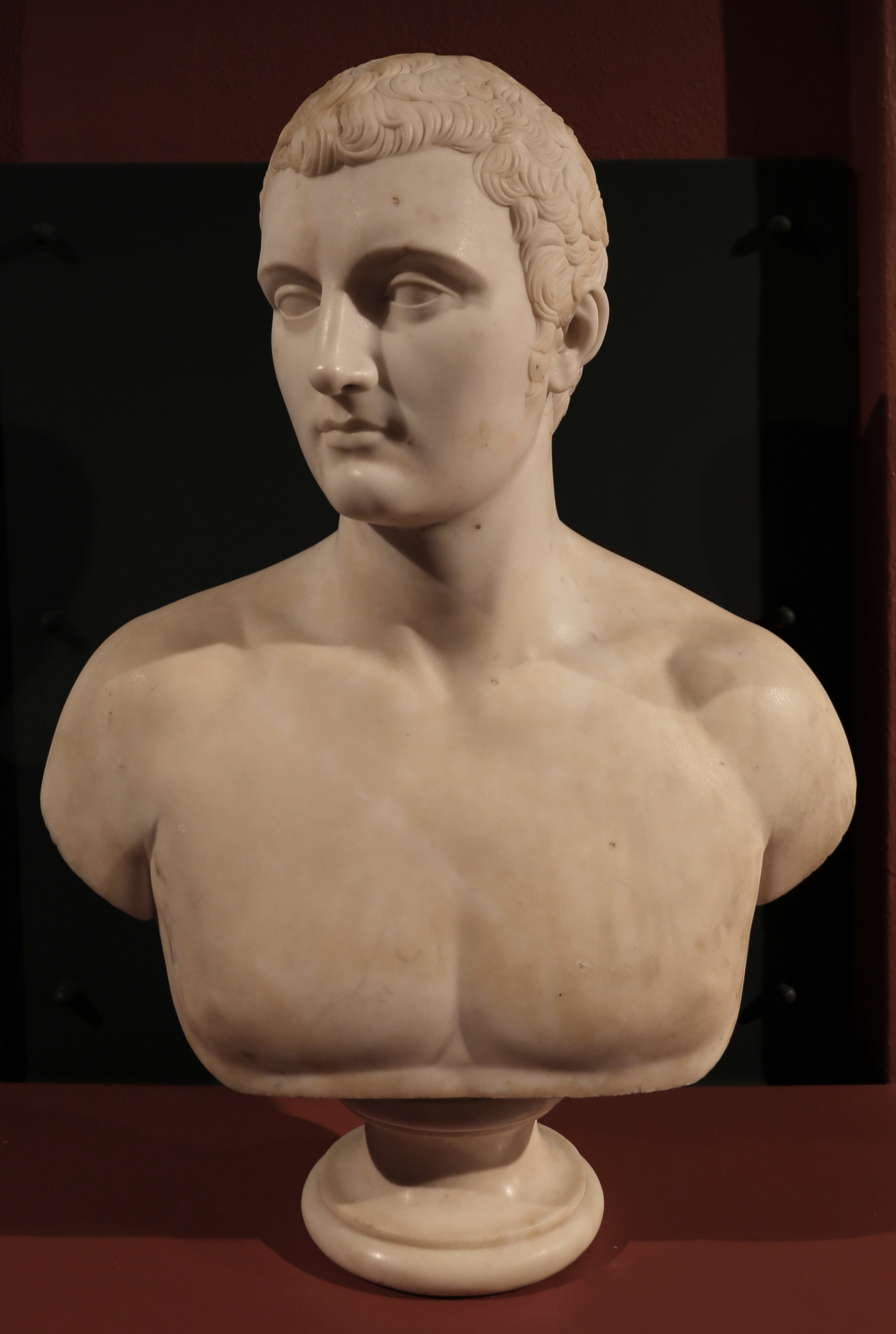
Portrait of Carlo Maria Bonaparte

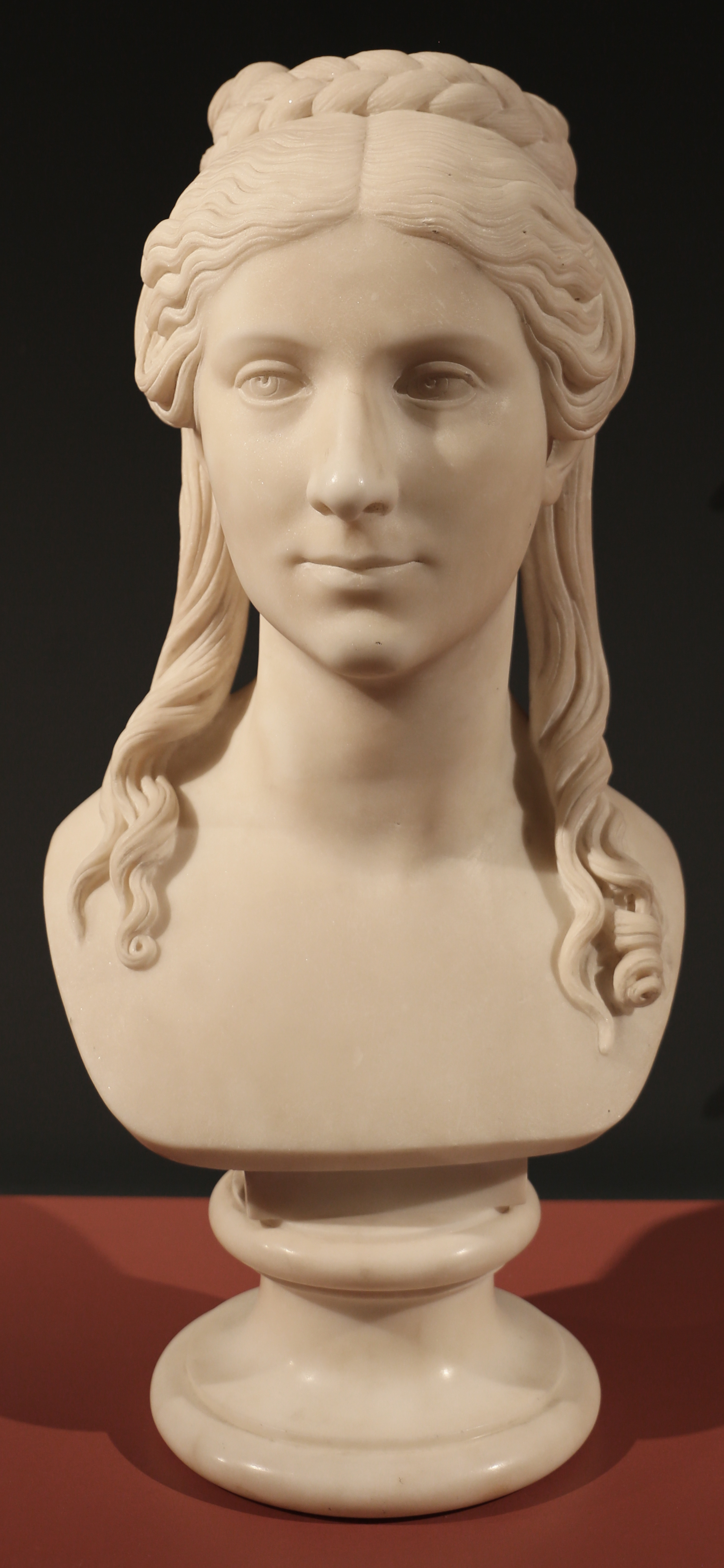
Portrait of Carlotta Bonaparte

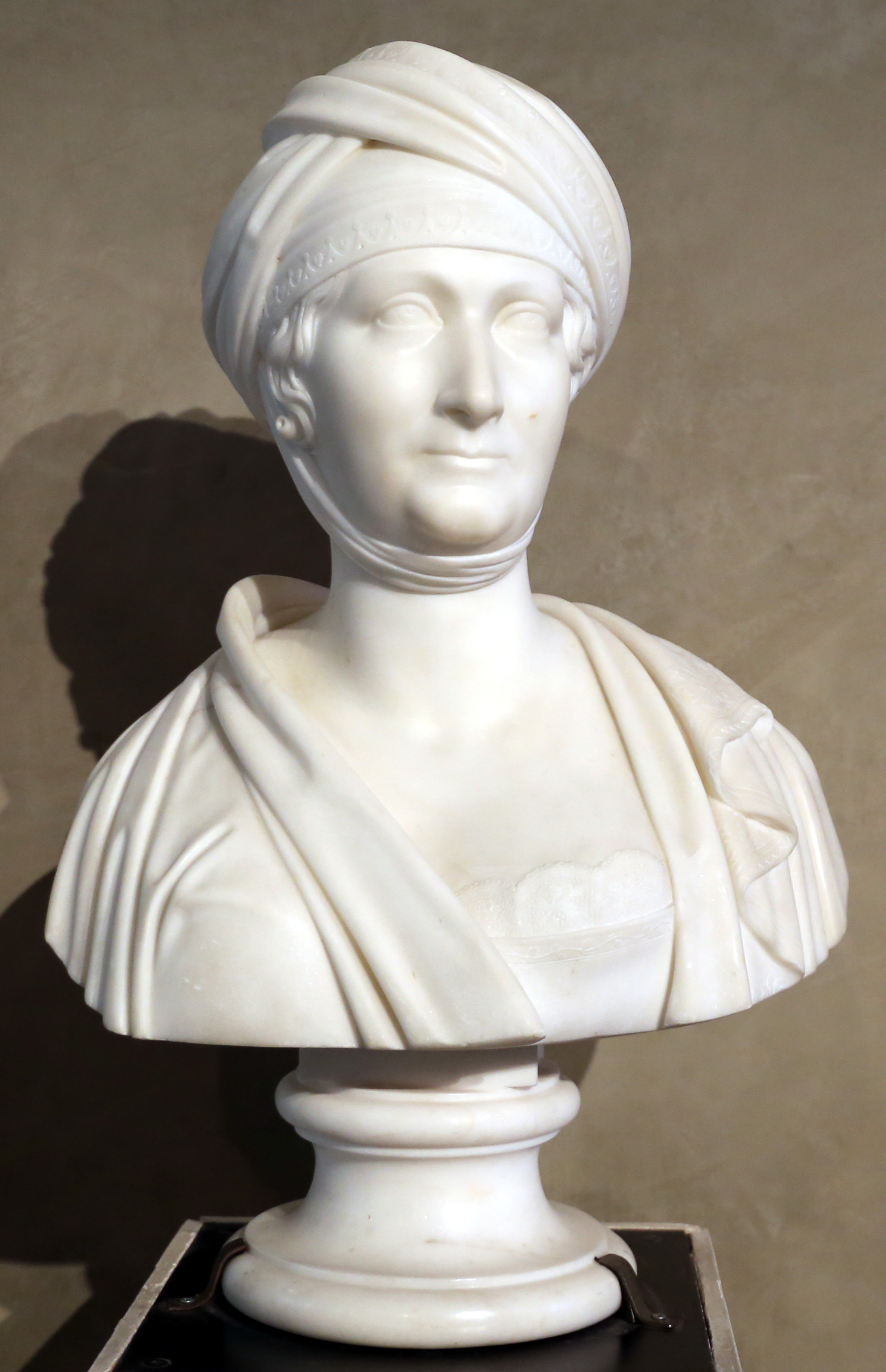
Portrait of Letizia Ramolino Bonaparte (1818)

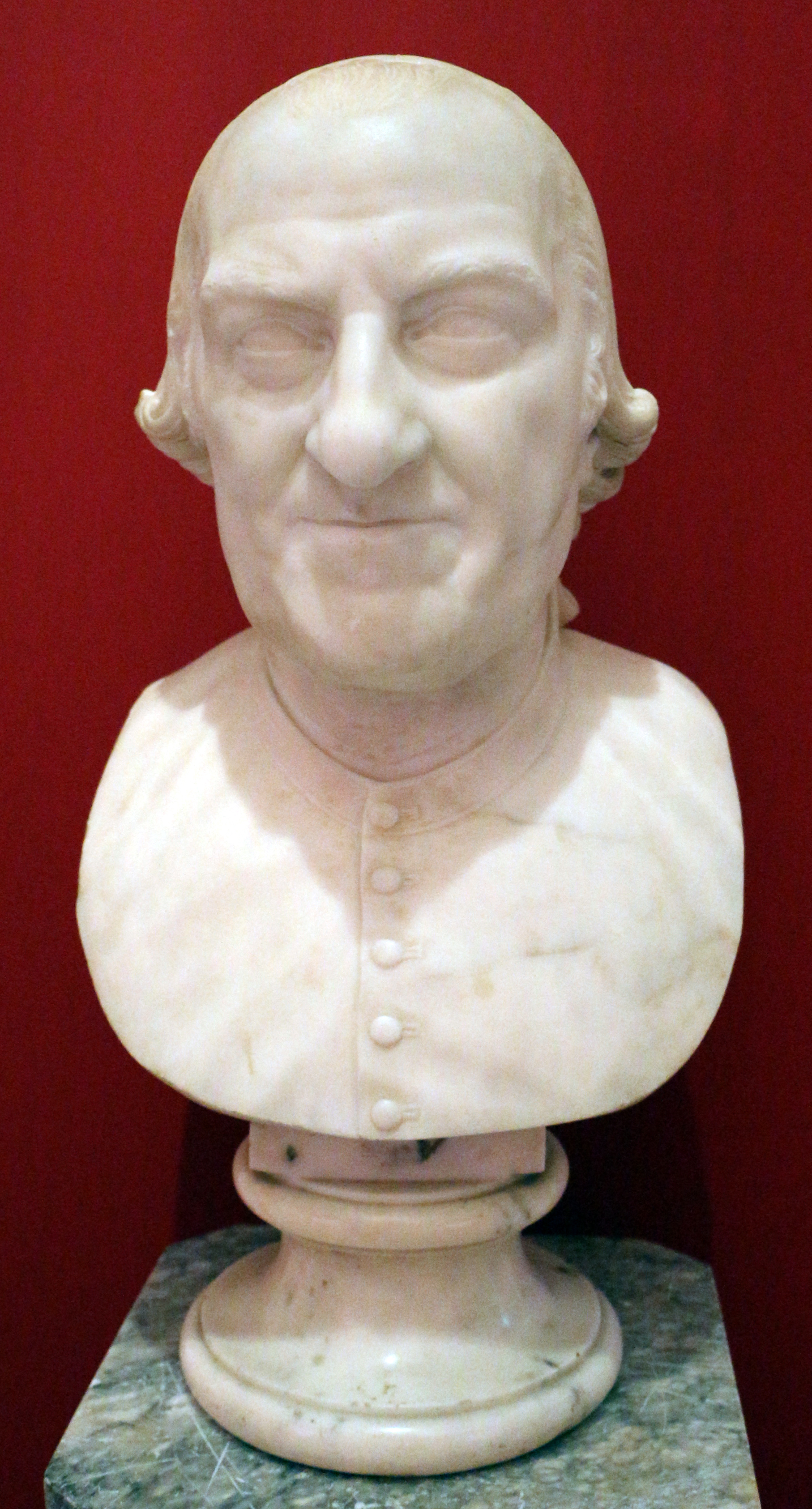
Portrait of Cardinal Zauli (1818)

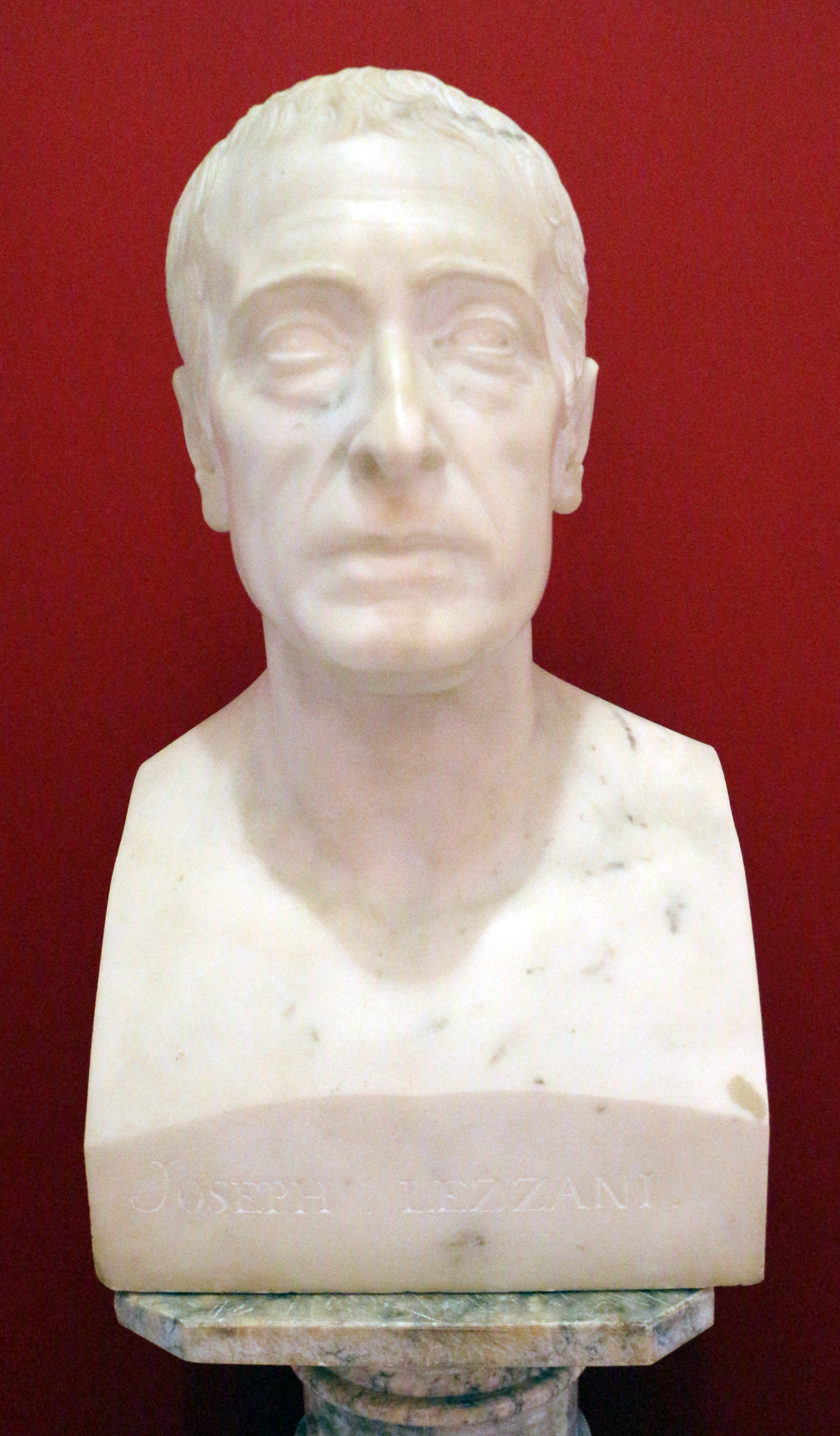
Portrait of Joseph Lézzani (1829)

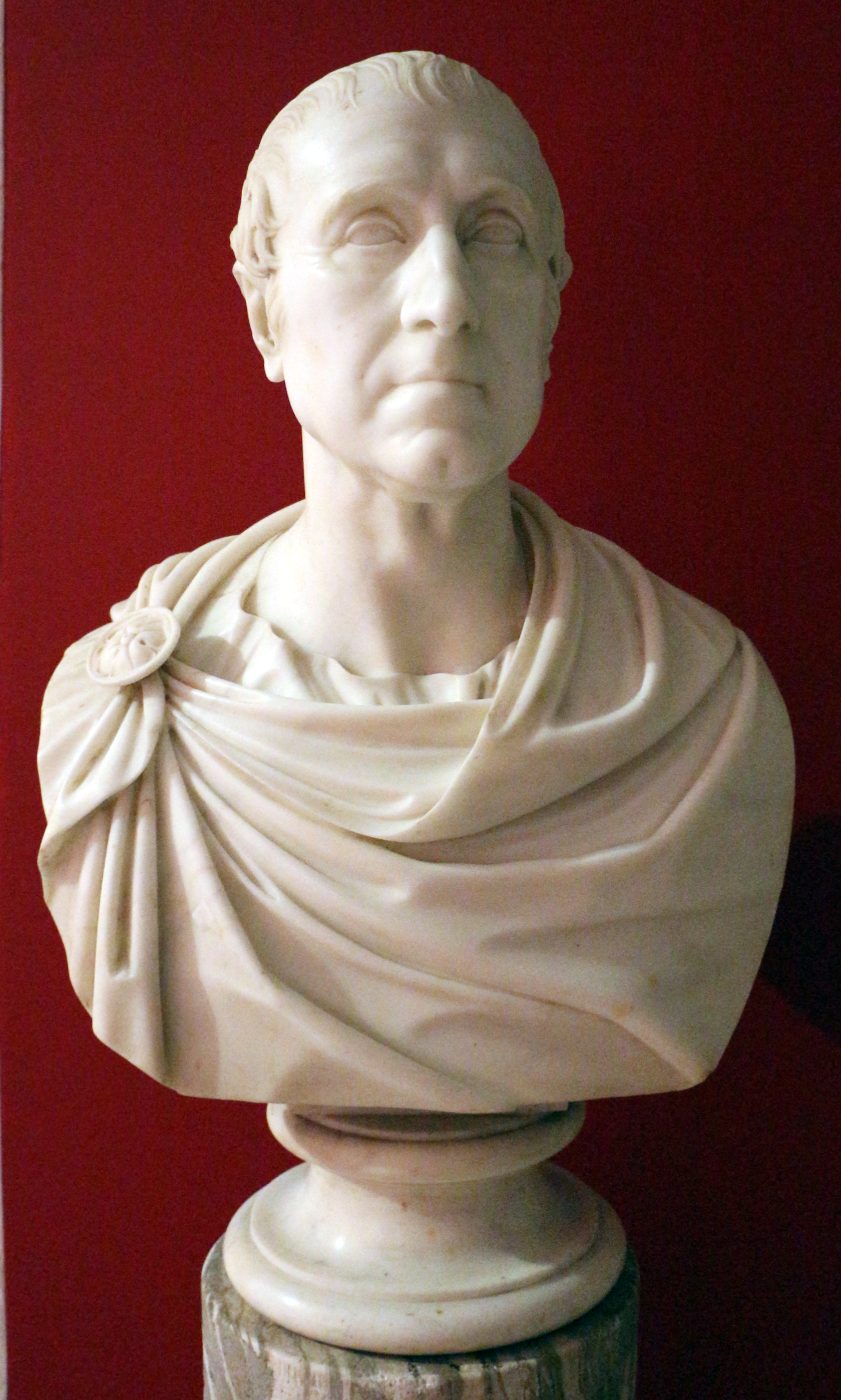
Portrait of Lord George Nugent (1830)
