= North Carolina State House =

Former capitol in Raleigh, North Carolina; destroyed by fire in 1831

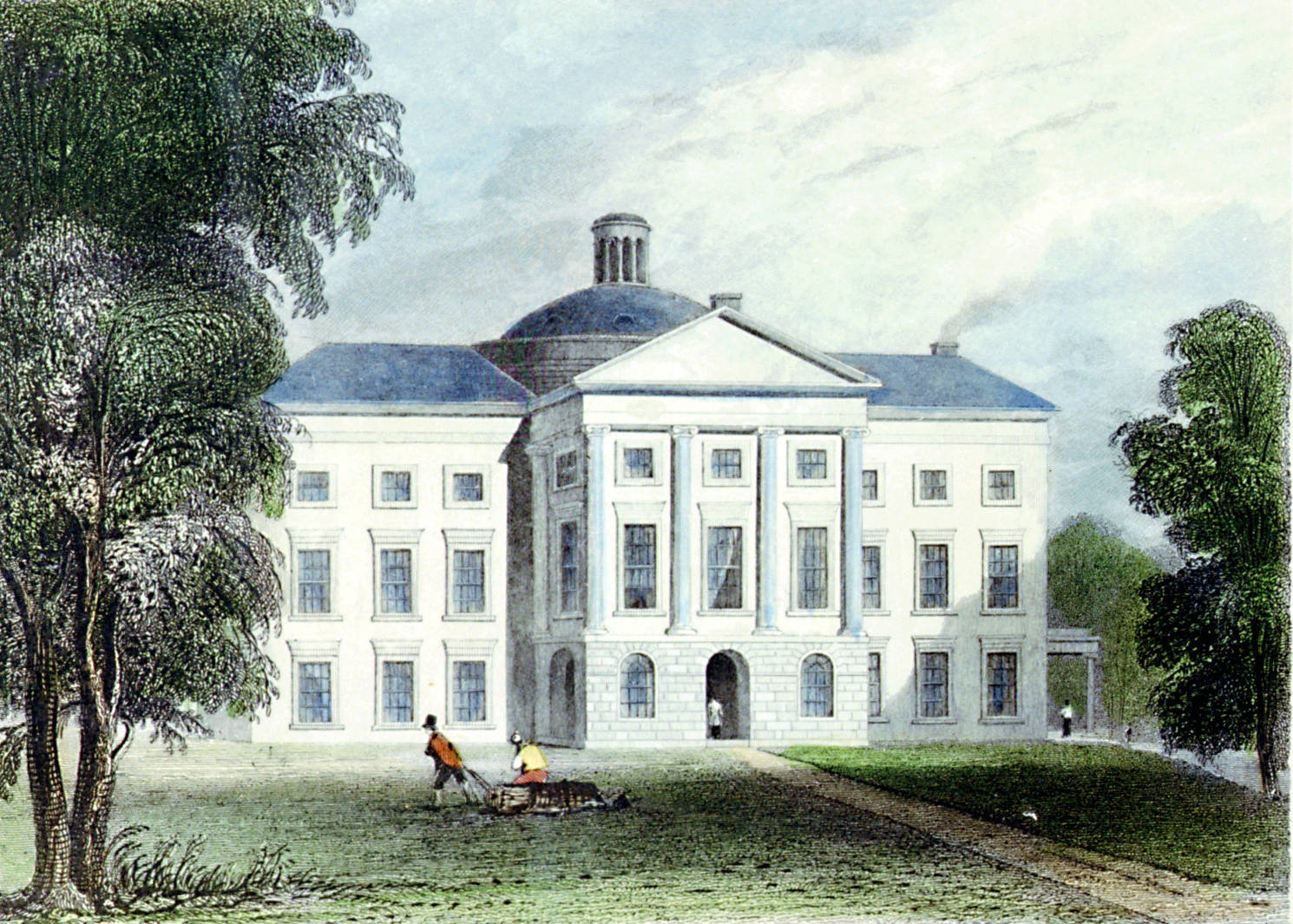
- Watercolor by William Goodacre

General information
- Status: Destroyed
- Architectural style: Neoclassical style
- Location: Raleigh, North Carolina
- Coordinates: 35.7804°N 78.6391°W
- Construction started: 1792
- Completed: 1796
- Renovated: 1820–24
- Destroyed: 1831

Renovating team
- Architect: William Nichols

The North Carolina State House was built from 1792 to 1796 as the state capitol for North Carolina. It was located at Union Square in the state capital, Raleigh, in Wake County. The building was extensively renovated in the neoclassical style by William Nichols, the state architect, from 1820 to 1824. On December 24, 1821, the statue of George Washington by Antonio Canova was displayed in the rotunda. Both were destroyed by fire in 1831.

== History ==
In 1792, Union Square in Raleigh was set as the location for the state capitol. The General Assembly first met here in 1794. The original two-story brick state house was completed in 1796.

On December 16, 1815, several months after the American success in the War of 1812, the House of Commons, and the Senate soon afterwards, unanimously resolved to commission, with no limit on expense, a statue of George Washington for the state house. Governor William Miller asked U.S. senators James Turner and Nathaniel Macon to find the best sculptor for this work. While William Thornton and Benjamin H. Latrobe, designers of the United States Capitol, thought it could be done in the United States, Joseph Hopkinson and Thomas Jefferson highly recommended Antonio Canova of Rome, Italy.

In 1816, the state commissioned a copy of Gilbert Stuart's Lansdowne Portrait of Washington to be painted by Thomas Sully. The painting was displayed in the state house in 1818. In 1819, the state commissioned The Passage of the Delaware by Sully, but its dimensions were too large to fit in the state house. This painting is now at the Museum of Fine Arts, Boston.

To accommodate Canova's George Washington, William Nichols was hired in 1818 as the state architect to redesign and enlarge the state house by adding a third floor and two wings. He created a neoclassical building in the style of the United States Capitol, combining Palladian and Greek Revival architectures. The construction was done from 1820 to 1824. The original cupola was replaced with a central dome and rotunda for the statue. The statue arrived in Raleigh on December 24, 1821 and was installed that same day as part of an official ceremony. It was attended by Governor Jesse Franklin and the legislature. Colonel William Polk, an officer in the American Revolutionary War, addressed the audience in the dedication speech, as reported in The Raleigh Register on December 28, starting:

Fellow Citizens:– An enlightened Legislature, faithful to the emotions of a grateful people, has procured the Statue of our beloved Washington, formed by the highest skill of an artist whom all agree in calling the Michael Angelo [sic] of the Age. ...

On June 21, 1831, while working to fireproof the building, workers accidentally set the roof on fire. Following the major fire of May 29 in Fayetteville, the state had decided to protect the wooden roof of the state house with zinc sheets. The accident occurred while soldering the nail heads to the zinc. The resulting destruction of both the state house and Canova's statue was described in The Raleigh Register on June 23 as follows:

Awful conflagration! It is our painful and melancholy duty again to announce to the public another appalling instance of loss by fire, which will be deeply felt and lamented by every individual in our State. It is nothing less than the total destruction of the Capitol of the State, located in this city. Of that noble edifice, with its splendid decorations, nothing now remains but the blackened walls and smouldering ruins. The State Library is also entirely consumed, and the Statue of Washington, that proud monument of national gratitude, which was our pride and glory, is so mutilated and defaced that none can behold it but with mournful feelings, and the conviction involuntarily forces itself upon their minds, that the loss is one which can not be repaired. The most active exertions were made to rescue this chef d'ouvre of Canova from the ravishes of the devouring elements, nor were they desisted from until the danger became imminent.

As the blaze burned from the roof towards the bottom of the building, North Carolina Secretary of State William Hill had time to save a significant amount of state documents, carrying them out of his office to the adjacent Union Square. From 1833 to 1840, a new North Carolina State Capitol was built on the same site. It also included a central domed rotunda, which now has a copy of Canova's statue. The Sully painting of Washington was rescued from the fire and reinstalled in the new building. From 1831 to 1838, the General Assembly met in the Governor's Palace, temporarily displacing the governor who moved into rented quarters. The Governor's Palace was the state-owned residence of the governor at the south end of Fayetteville Street, built in 1816. The 1838-1839 General Assembly met in a new building owned by Benjamin B. Smith at the corner of Market and Fayetteville streets.

== Gallery ==
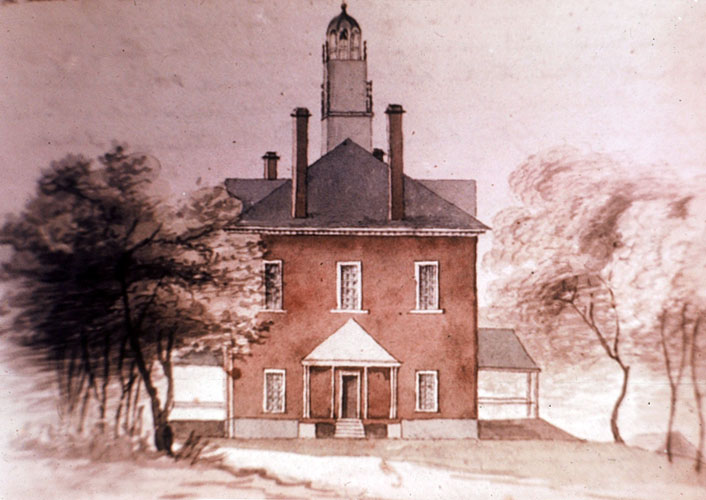
Watercolor by J.S. Glennie of original two-story brick state house, 1811

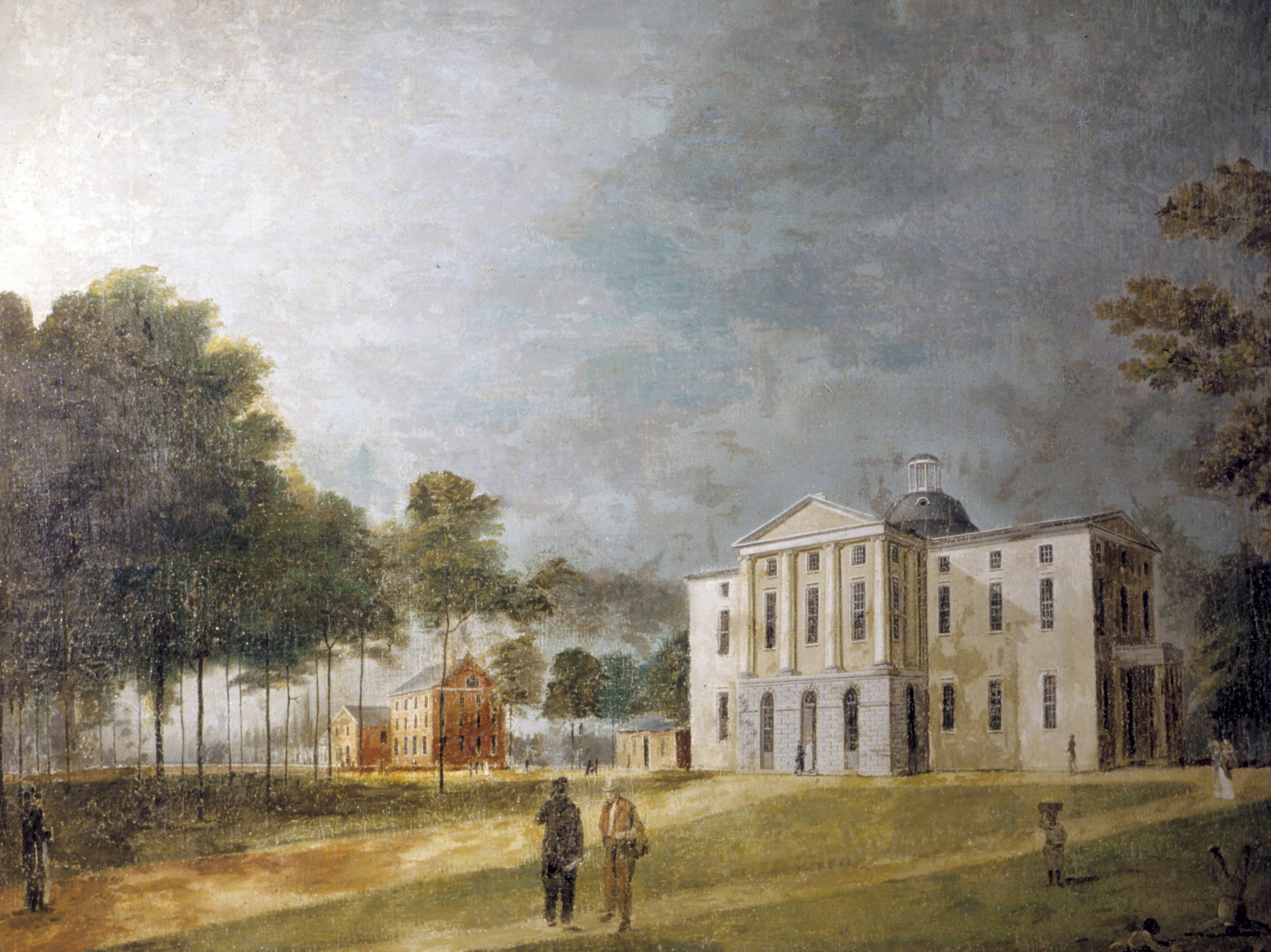
Watercolor by Jacob Marling depicting renovated state house, 1825

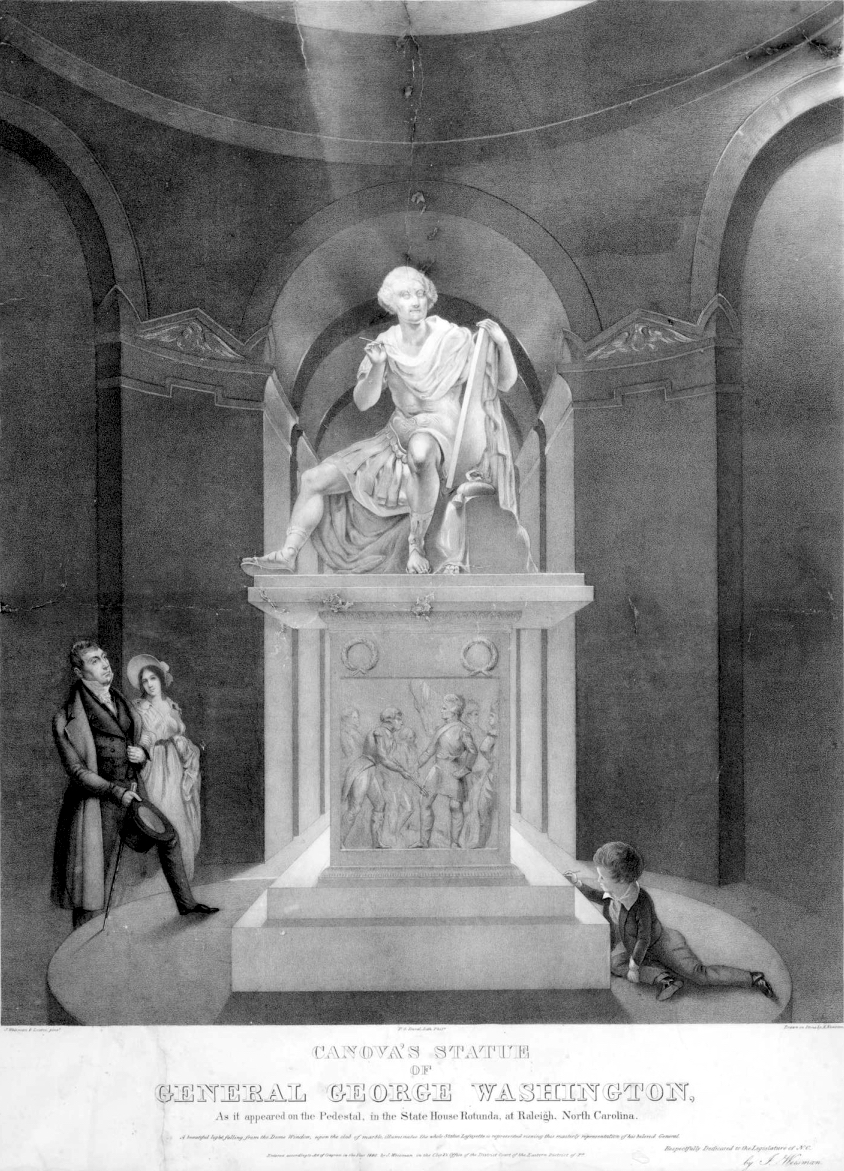
Canova's George Washington in the rotunda

== Bibliography ==
- Betts, Jack (August 1989). "The Department of the Secretary of State: Which Way Now?" (PDF). North Carolina Insight. pp. 2–20.
- Connor, R.D.W. (1910), Canova's Statue of Washington, The North Carolina Historical Commission, OCLC 1041641544
