= Romano Vio =

Italian sculptor

"Dana".

Artist at work

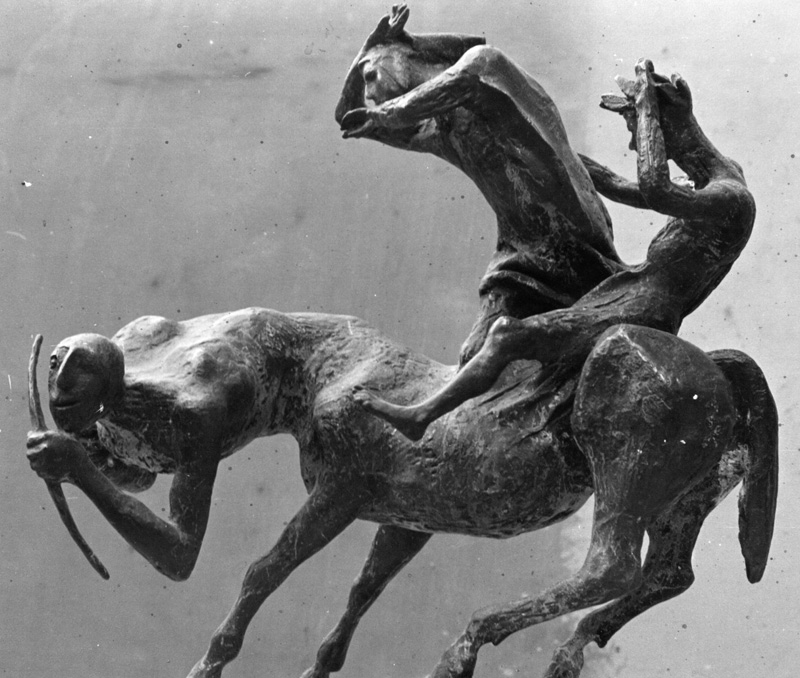
"The violent ones against the next one".

Romano Vio (11 February 1913 – 23 August 1984) was an Italian sculptor. He was born in Venice and was taught sculpture there.
