= Antonio Trentanove =

Italian sculptor

Antonio Trentanove (c. 1745 – 1812) was an Italian sculptor and stucco-artist, active in Bologna in a Neoclassical style.

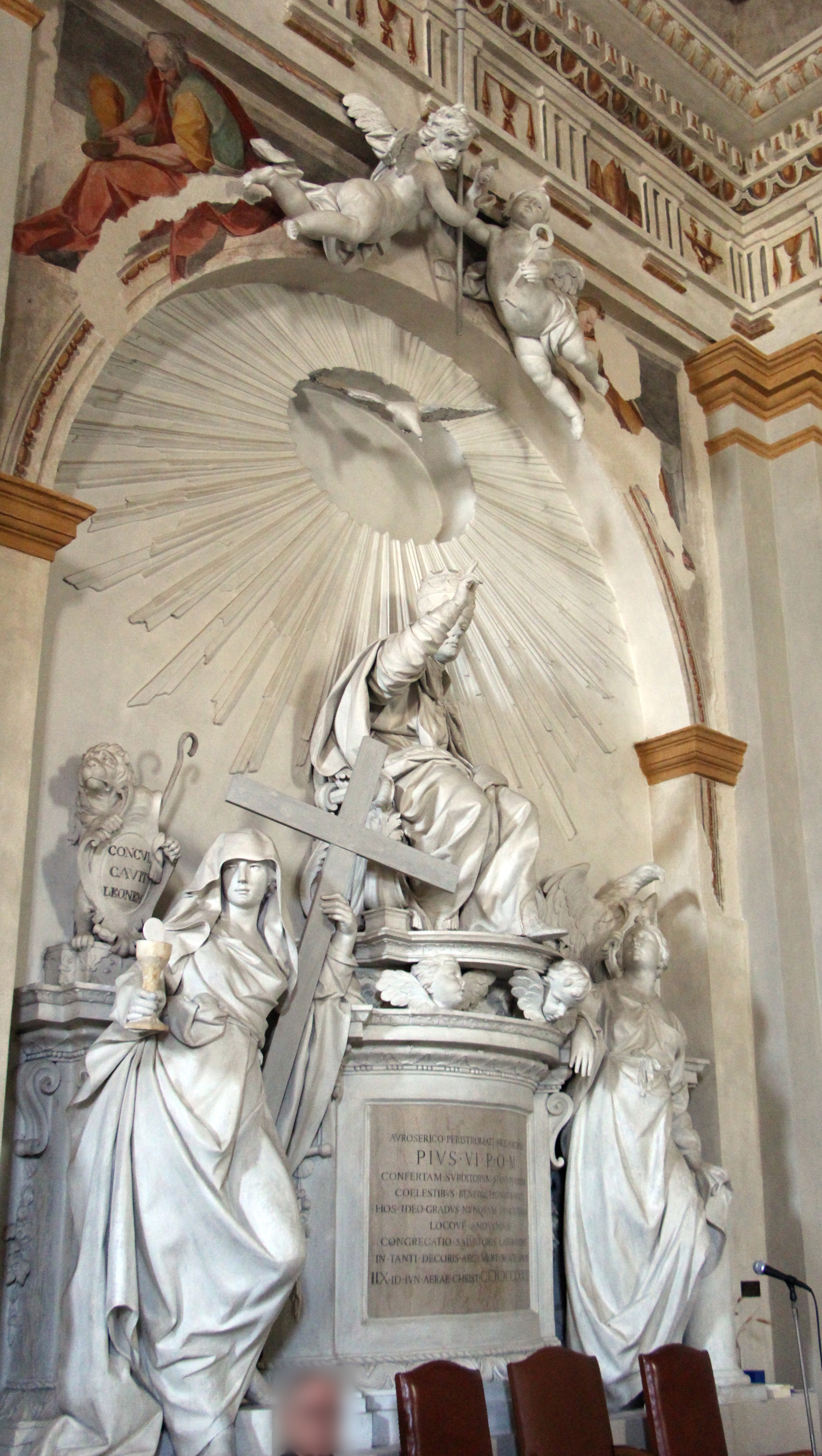
Monument to Pope Pius VI (1784, Rimini)

He was born in Rimini and studied at the Accademia Clementina. He is best known for his stucco decorations. He completed some stucco reliefs as part of a team led by Felice Giani for the Palazzo Laderchi in Faenza. Some of his other works are in the church of San Girolamo in Rimini, in the church of Santa Lucia in Forlì and the Palazzo Milzetti in Faenza. He later lived in Massa Marittima for some years and died in Carrara. His son, Raimondo, studied sculpture with Antonio Canova.

Photographs by Paolo Monti, 1976

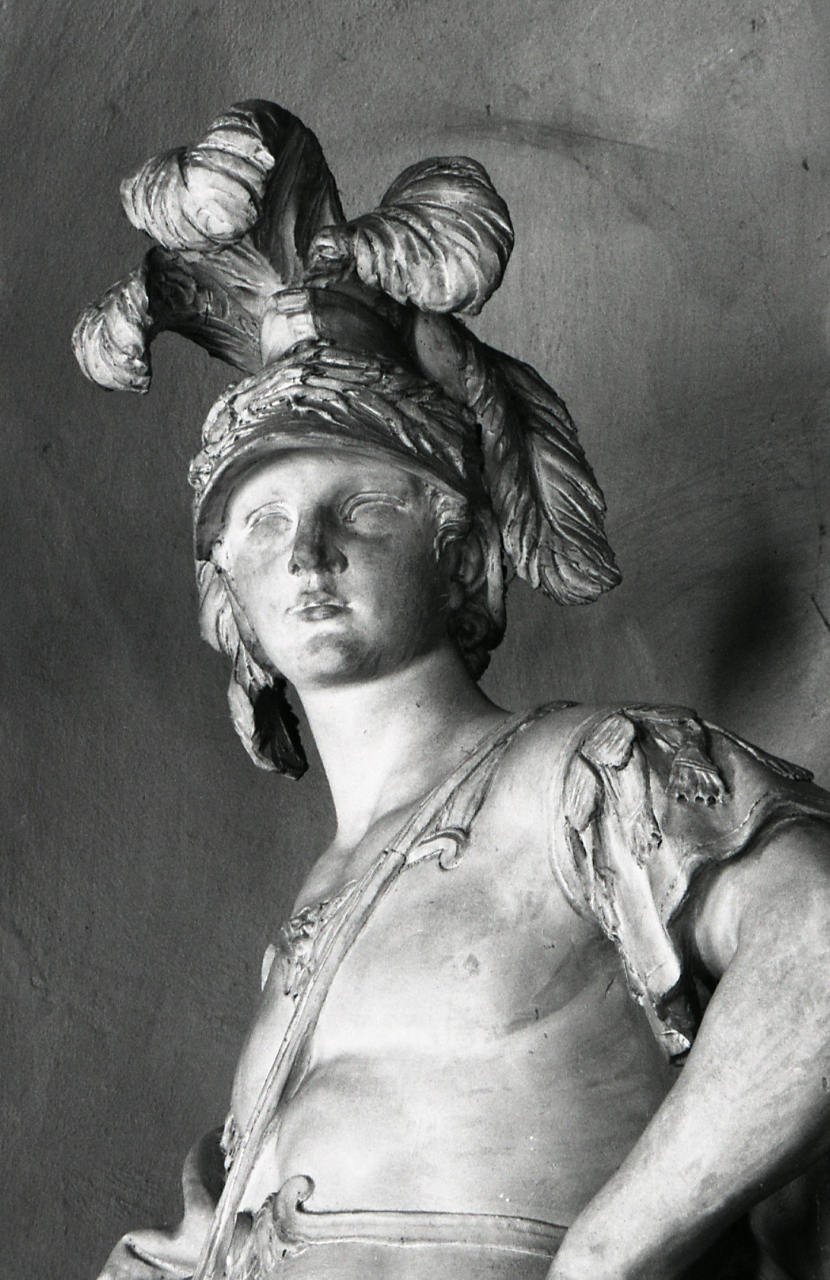
Olympian gods, Municipal Theater Masini of Faenza

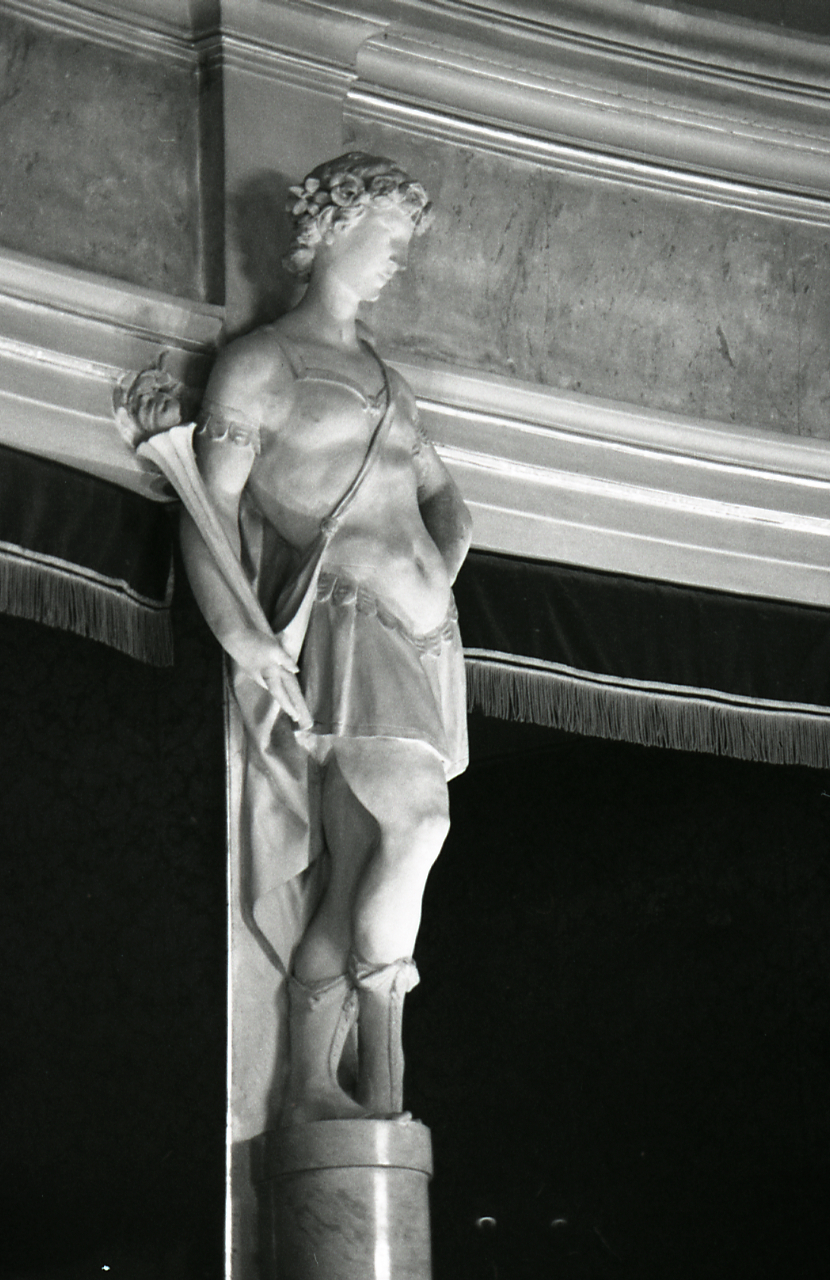
Olympian gods, Municipal Theater Masini of Faenza

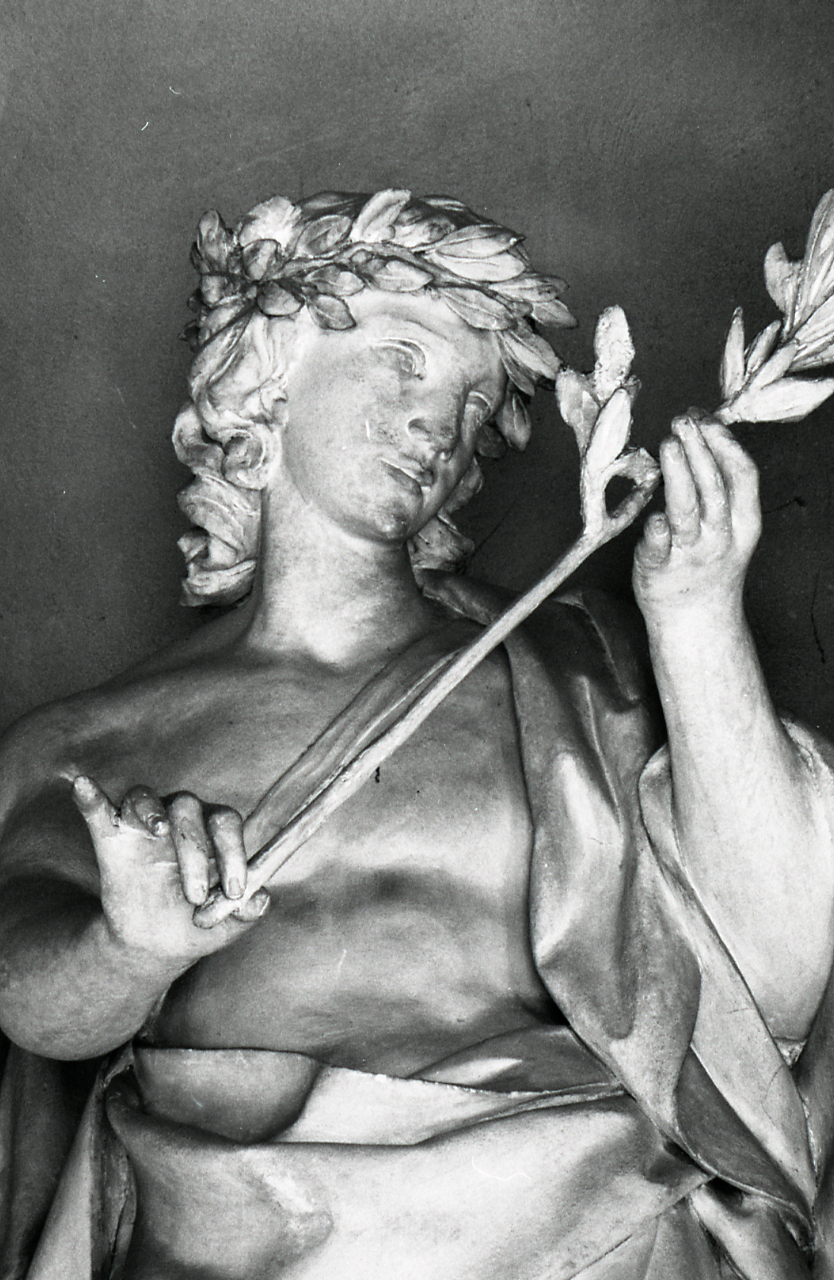
Olympian gods, Municipal Theater Masini of Faenza

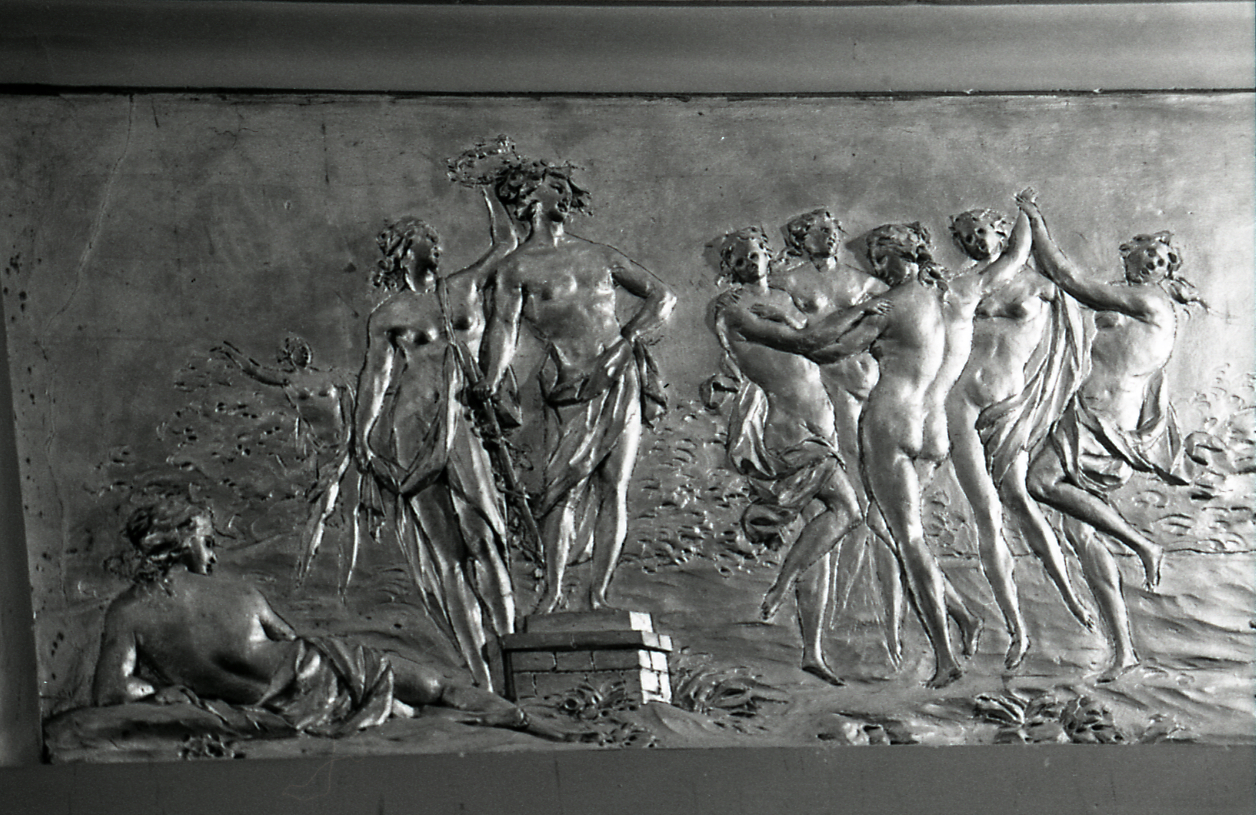
Mythical and Roman stories, Municipal Theater Masini of Faenza
