= Caxias do Sul =

Municipality of Rio Grande do Sul, Brazil

- Municipality
- Municipality of Caxias do Sul
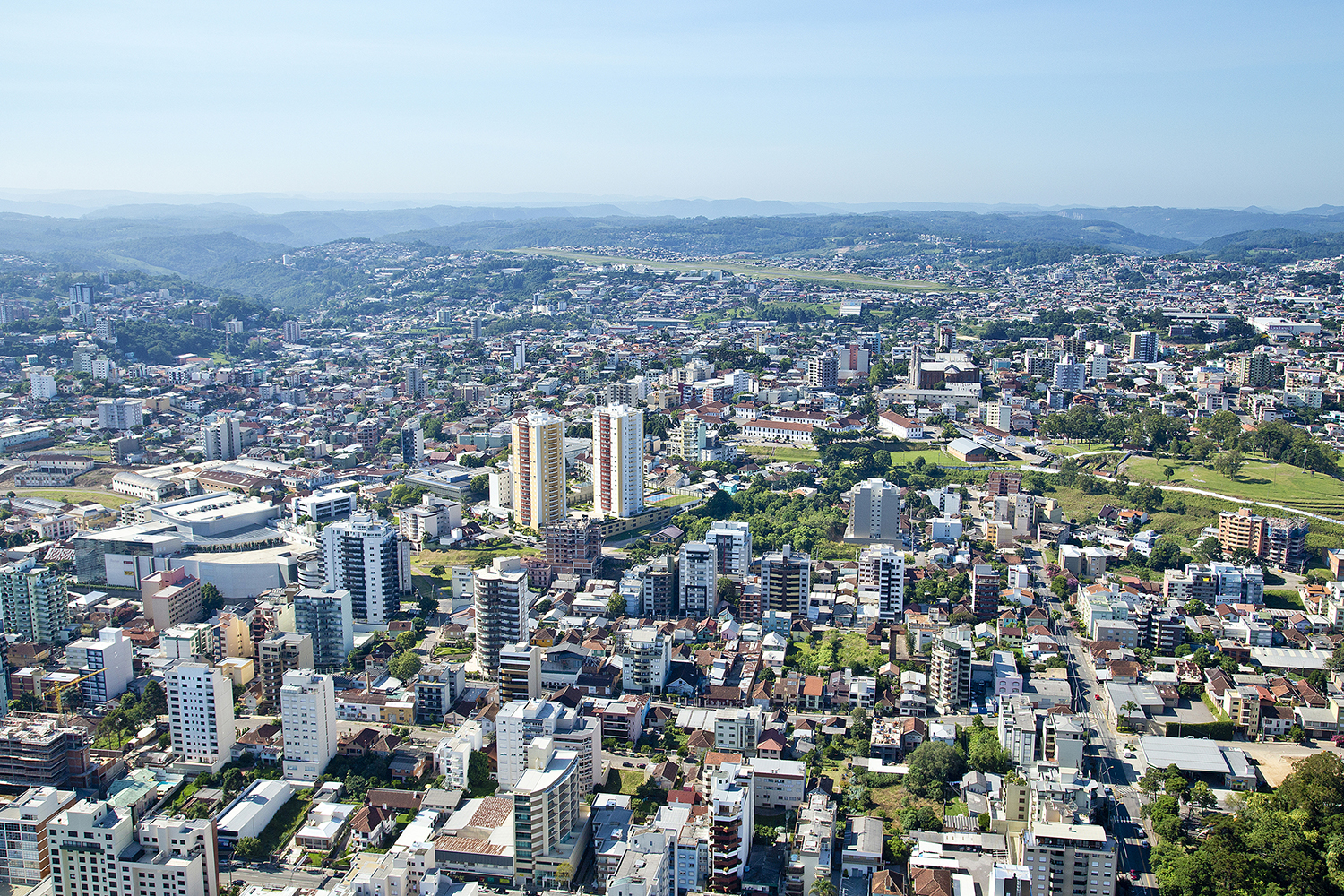
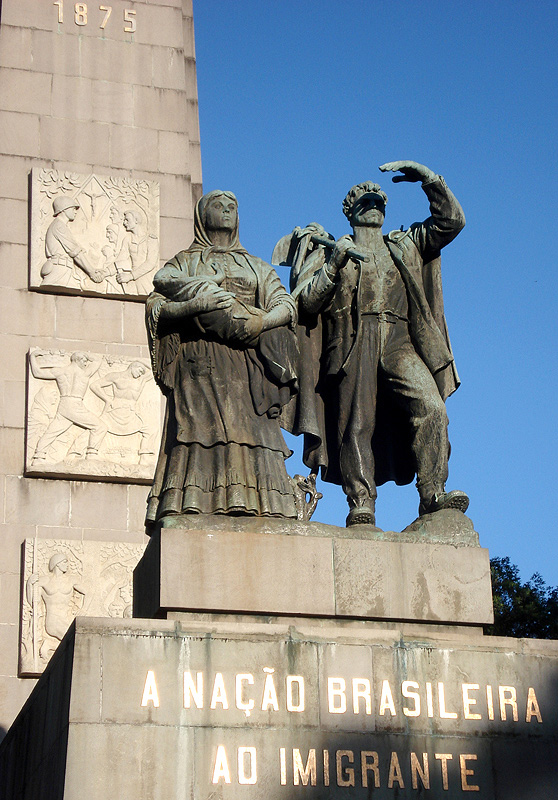
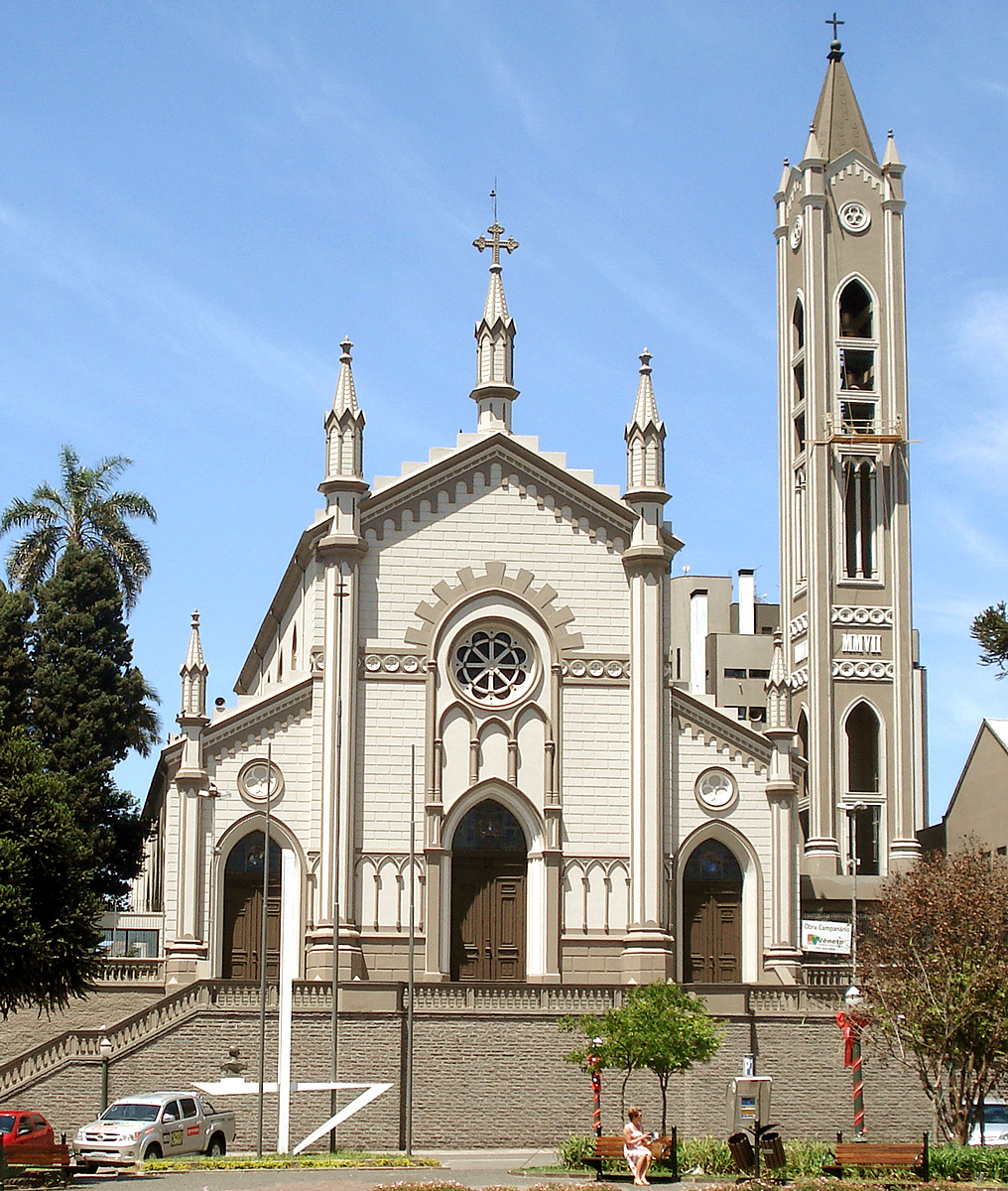
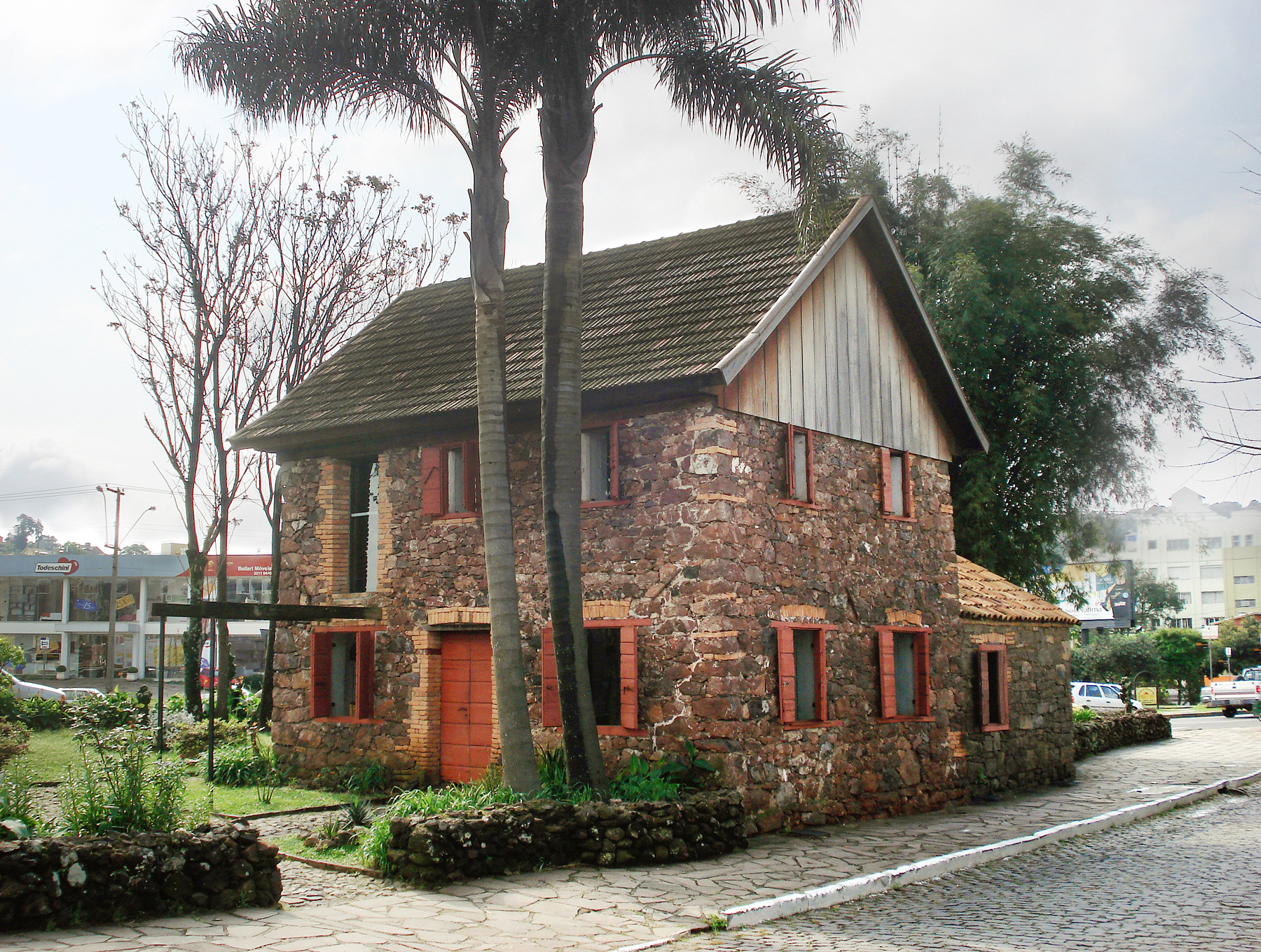
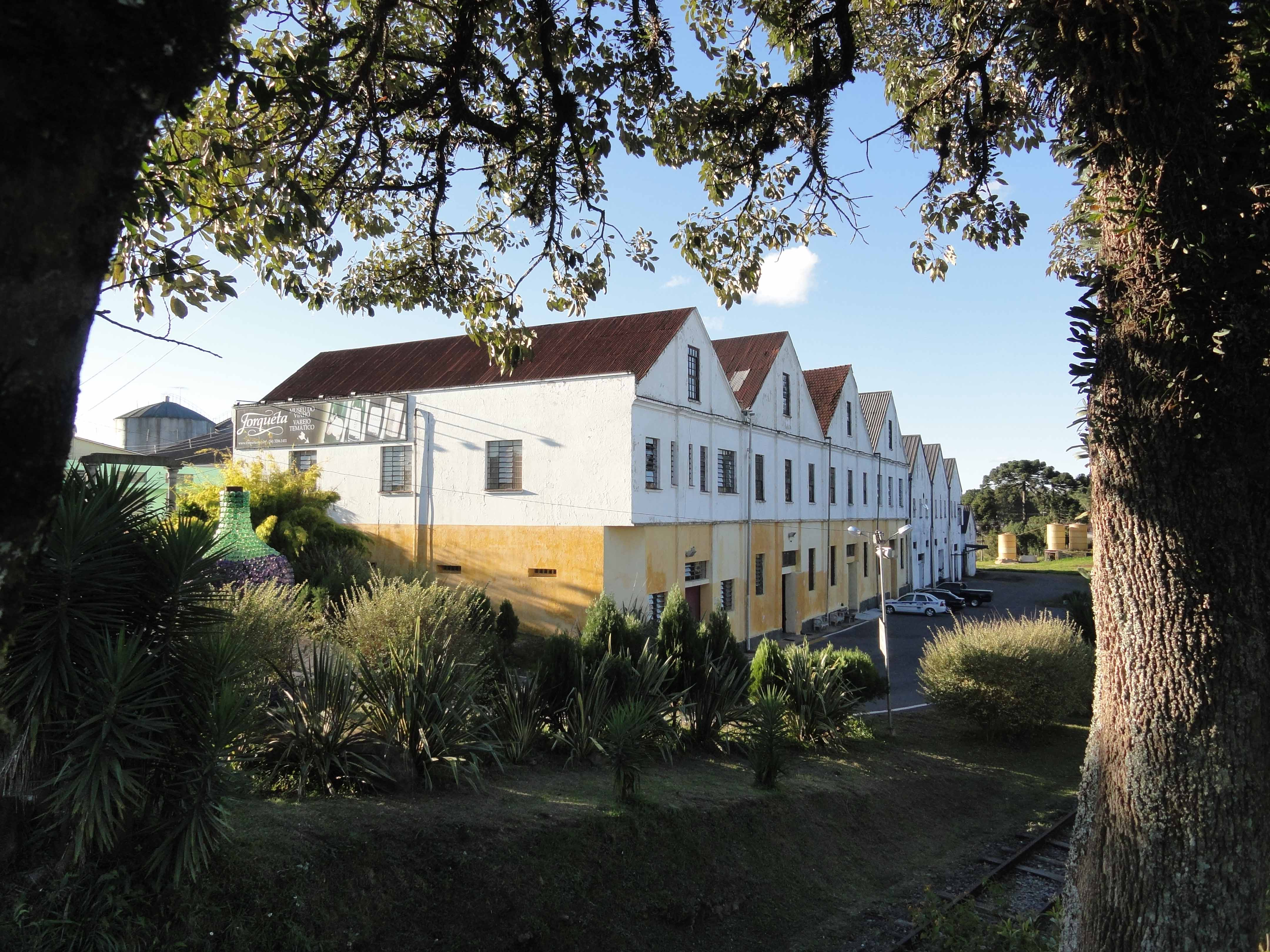
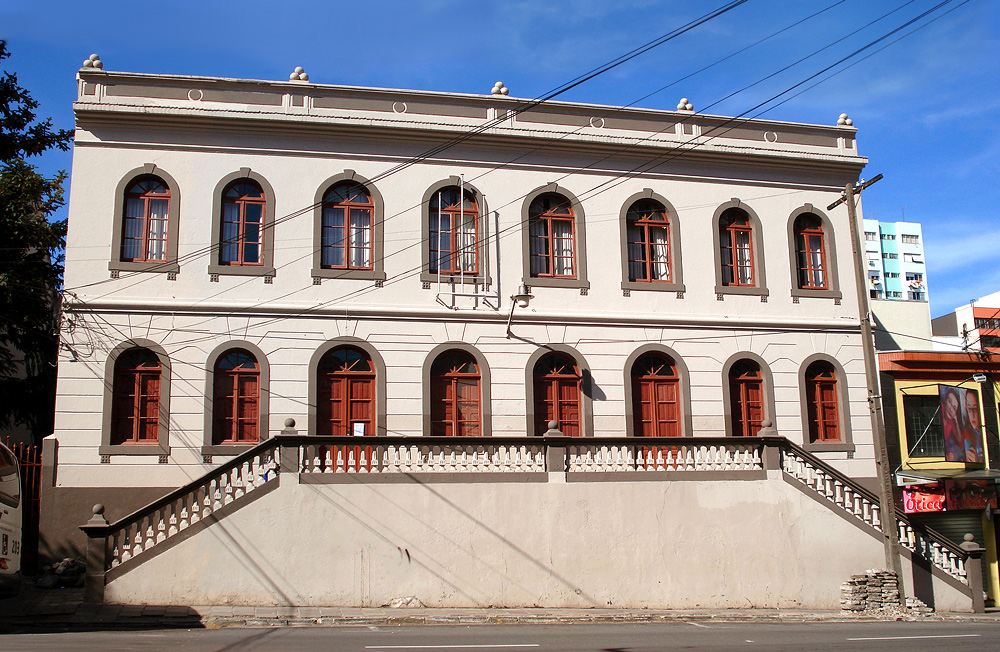
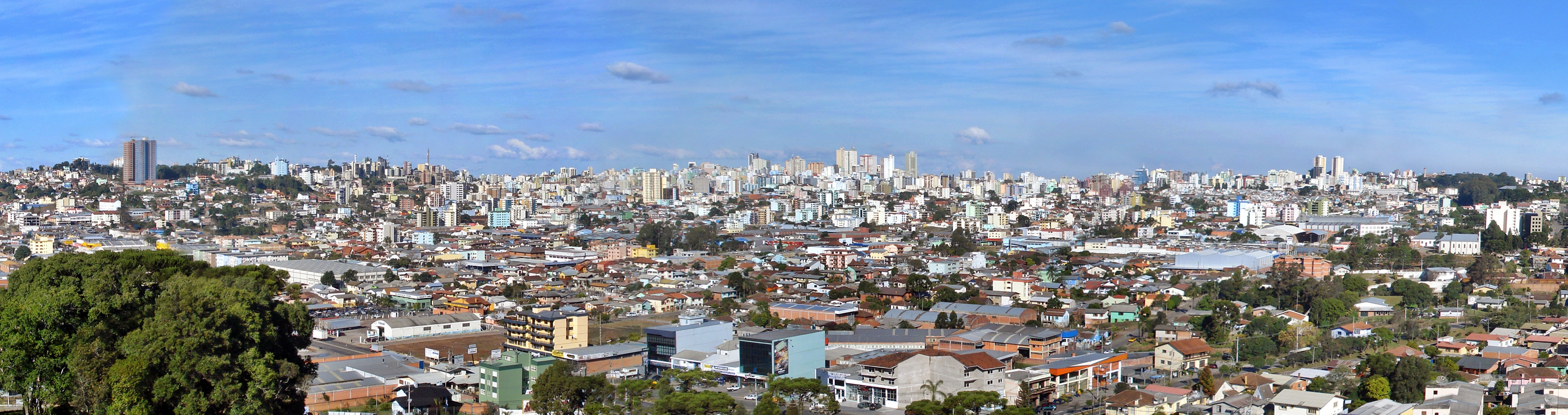
- From top to bottom, left to right: aerial view of the city; National Monument to the Immigrant; Caxias do Sul Cathedral; Stone House Museum; Primo Slomp Grape and Wine Museum; Municipal Museum of Caxias do Sul; and a panoramic view of the city.

- Flag Coat of arms
- Anthem: Anthem of the municipality of Caxias do Sul
- Location in Rio Grande do Sul

- Location in Brazil
- Coordinates: 29°10′04″S 51°10′44″W
- Country: Brazil
- Region: South
- State: Rio Grande do Sul
- Metropolitan region: Serra Gaúcha
- Neighboring municipalities: North: São Marcos, Campestre da Serra, and Monte Alegre dos Campos; South: Vale Real, Nova Petrópolis, Gramado, and Canela; East: São Francisco de Paula; West: Flores da Cunha and Farroupilha
- Founded: 20 June 1890
- Emancipated: 1 June 1910

Government
  - Mayor: Adiló Didomenico (PSDB)
  - Term: 2025–2028

Area
  - Municipality: 1,652.308 km^{2} (637.960 sq mi)
  - Urban (Embrapa est.): 65.5 km^{2} (25.3 sq mi)
- Elevation: 817 m (2,680 ft)

Population (2022)
  - Municipality: 463,501
  - Estimate (2025): 479,599
  - Rank: RS: 2nd BR: 48th
  - Density: 280.517/km^{2} (726.537/sq mi)
- Demonym: Caxiense
- Time zone: UTC-3 (BRT)
  - Summer (DST): Does not observe DST
- Postal code: 95000-000
- HDI: 0.782 (2010)
- HDI rank: RS: 12th BR: 113th
- Gini: 0.48 (IBGE est. 2003)
- GDP: R$25,965,161.31 (2020)
- GDP rank: RS: 2nd BR: 37th
- GDP per capita: R$50,178.98 (2020)
- Distance to capital: Federal: 2,543 km (1,580 mi); State: 127 km (79 mi)
- Climate: Oceanic (Cfb)
- Website: www.caxias.rs.gov.br

Caxias do Sul is a Brazilian municipality in the state of Rio Grande do Sul. Located in the northeast of the state at an elevation of 817 meters, it is the largest city in the Serra Gaúcha region, the second most populous city in Rio Grande do Sul, surpassed only by the state capital Porto Alegre, and the 47th largest city in Brazil.

Throughout its history, Caxias do Sul has been known as Campo dos Bugres (until 1877), Colônia de Caxias (1877–1884), and Santa Teresa de Caxias (1884–1890). The city was established where the Vacaria Plateau begins to break into numerous valleys, intersected by small waterways, resulting in a rugged topography in its southern part. The area was inhabited by indigenous Kaingang people since time immemorial, but they were forcibly displaced by so-called "bugreiros" to make way, in the late 19th century, for the Empire of Brazil's decision to colonize the region with a European population. Consequently, thousands of immigrants, primarily Italians from the Veneto region, but also including some Germans, French, Spaniards, and Poles, crossed the sea and ascended the Serra Gaúcha, exploring an area that was still almost entirely uncharted.

After an initial period filled with hardships and deprivation, the immigrants succeeded in establishing a prosperous city, with an economy initially based on the exploitation of agricultural products, particularly grapes and wine, whose success is reflected in the rapid expansion of commerce and industry in the first half of the 20th century. Concurrently, the rural and ethnic roots of the community began to lose relative importance in the economic and cultural landscape as urbanization progressed, an educated urban elite emerged, and the city became more integrated with the rest of Brazil. During the first government of Getúlio Vargas, a significant crisis arose between the immigrants and their early descendants and the Brazilian milieu, as nationalism was emphasized, and cultural and political expressions of foreign ethnic origin were severely repressed. After World War II, the situation was pacified, and Brazilians and foreigners began to work together for the common good.

Since then, the city has grown rapidly, multiplying its population, achieving high levels of economic and human development, and developing one of the most dynamic economies in Brazil, with a presence in numerous international markets. Its culture has also internationalized, with several higher education institutions and a significant artistic and cultural life in various forms, while simultaneously facing challenges typical of rapidly growing cities, such as pollution, the emergence of slums, and rising crime.

== History ==
=== Origins and colonization ===
Before the arrival of Italian immigrants in the 19th century, the region was inhabited by indigenous Kaingang people, hence its former name: Campo dos Bugres. Tropeiros also passed through the area on their journeys between the south of the state and the central region of the country. The Jesuits attempted to establish some reductions, though without success.

In the second half of the 19th century, due to the war of Italian unification, Italy faced severe social and economic crises, and impoverished farmers could no longer sustain themselves. During this period, the Brazilian imperial government decided to colonize uninhabited areas in the south of the country, encouraging immigration from Italy, following the success of a similar initiative with German settlers. The chosen area, then known as Fundos de Nova Palmira, consisted of unclaimed lands bordered by the Campos de Cima da Serra to the north and the German-colonized valley region to the south.

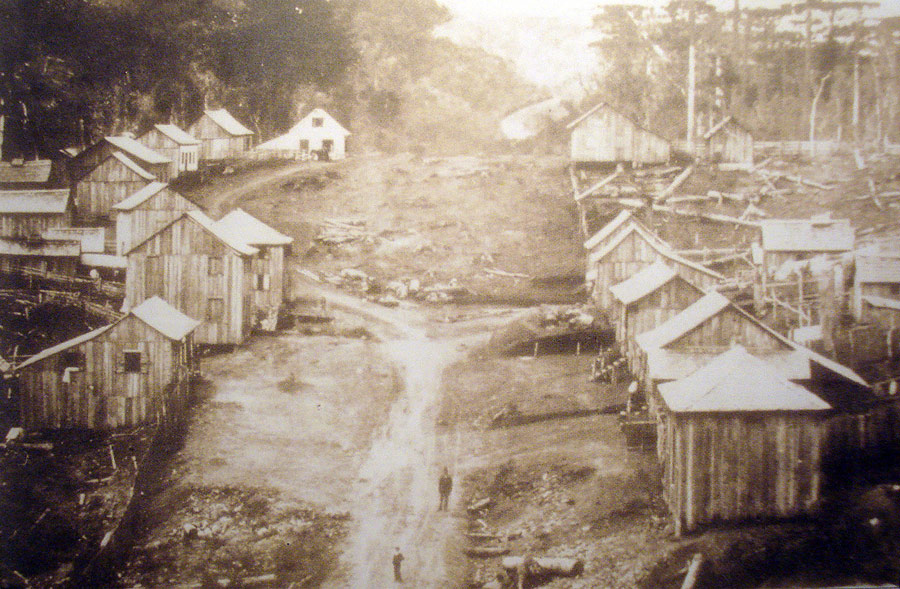
The original urban core of the city around 1876

In 1875, the first settlers, mostly from the Veneto region, arrived after enduring a grueling month-long crossing of the Atlantic Ocean on overcrowded ships, where deaths from disease and poor conditions were common. Initially, immigrants disembarked in Rio de Janeiro, where they remained in quarantine at the Immigrants' House. They then traveled by steamship to the South, arriving in Porto Alegre, where they were directed to the former Porto Guimarães, now the municipality of São Sebastião do Caí. From there, they ascended the serra, traversing a largely wild region, until reaching their destination: the area now known as Nova Milano. From 1876, they moved to the so-called Sede Dante, the future site of Caxias do Sul, the administrative center of the colony, the first to be demarcated in the region. They were received in a wooden shed, hence the nickname "Barracão" also given to the small colonial seat. Subsequently, they were distributed to the rural plots assigned to them by the government. A year later, approximately 2,000 settlers were already in the area. On April 11, 1877, the official name of the place became Colônia Caxias, in honor of the Duke of Caxias.

=== Development ===
Despite some official assistance, initial conditions were extremely challenging. Families were largely isolated from one another due to the absence or poor state of roads. In addition to being unfamiliar with the still-wild environment, the settlers had primitive and scarce tools, and the agricultural techniques brought from Italy were not well-suited to the local climate and soil. Until houses were built and agriculture yielded results, sustenance came from gathering, hunting, and selling felled timber. Only the efforts of each family unit ensured their survival in the early days, and as survival depended on the number of workers, families tended to be large. As a result, Colônia Caxias grew rapidly, also due to the continuous influx of new immigrants, and soon established an economy based on subsistence. The main crops were wheat, beans, and maize, followed by potatoes, barley, and rye. Fruit trees such as chestnut, quince, apple, pear, orange, and cherry trees were introduced, and chickens, cows, goats, pigs, sheep, and rabbits were raised. Additionally, there was some production of honey and silk.

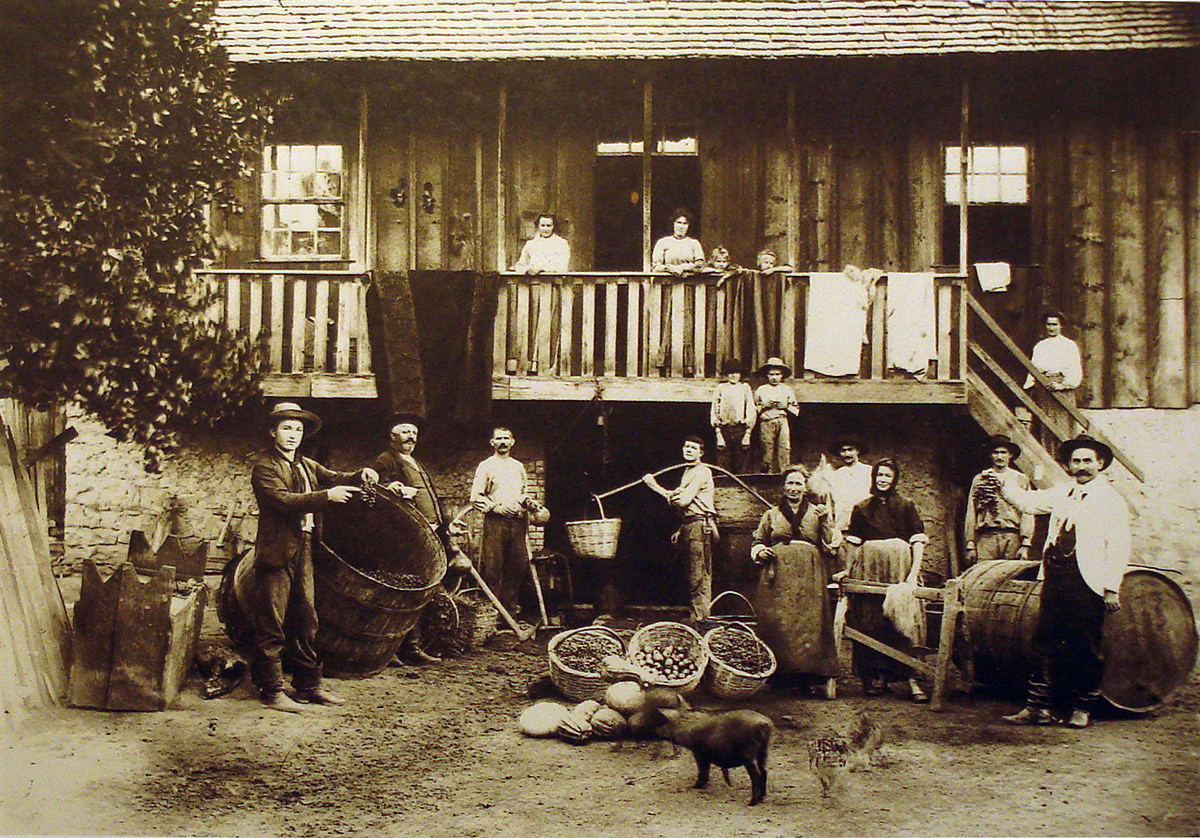
An agricultural fair in the 3ª Légua, rural area of Caxias, c. 1918

Nevertheless, commercial and industrial development soon emerged in the urban center, primarily focused on processing and distributing surplus agricultural products. General stores and small factories, such as those specializing in tinwork, carpentry, joinery, brickmaking, goldsmithing, blacksmithing, milling, saddlery, shoemaking, and tailoring, appeared. These businesses provided the emerging colony with self-sufficiency. The result of this activity was evident in 1881 at the first Agroindustrial Fair, the origin of the modern Festa da Uva, which centralized the small rural fairs and festivals. By 1883, the colony had 93 commercial establishments for a population of 7,359 inhabitants.

On April 12, 1884, the colony lost its status as an Imperial Crown Colony and was annexed to the municipality of São Sebastião do Caí as its 5th District, by which time it had a population of 10,500. Its name changed to Freguesia de Santa Tereza de Caxias, defining it as an administrative unit with its own parish. On October 30, 1886, the Municipal Chamber of São Sebastião do Caí established a municipal code for the freguesia of Caxias and appointed João Muratore as its first district administrator, though de facto administration remained in the hands of imperial officials, who viewed Italians with suspicion as administrators. It was not until June 28, 1890, that Italians gained leadership positions, starting a tradition that would take time to consolidate. On that date, the State President, having emancipated the district on June 20, elevating it to an autonomous municipality, appointed the first Governing Board of Caxias, composed of Italians Angelo Chitolina, Ernesto Marsiaj, and Salvador Sartori. By 1895, telegraph lines crossed the village, and in 1906, the first telephone network was inaugurated.

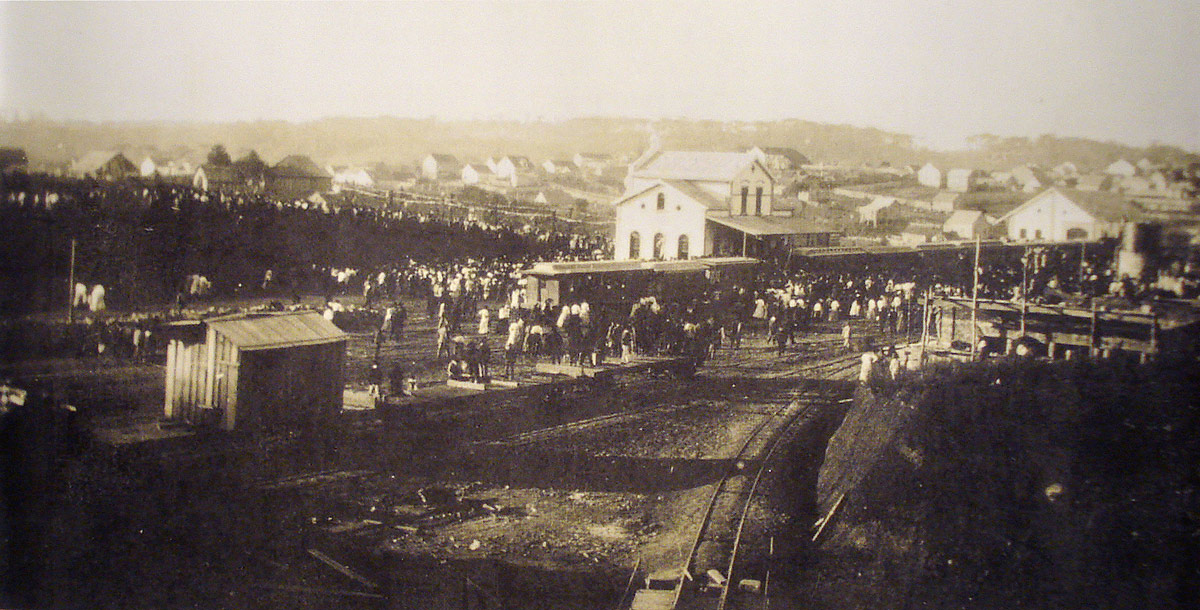
Inauguration of the railway on June 1, 1910, the date Caxias was elevated to city status

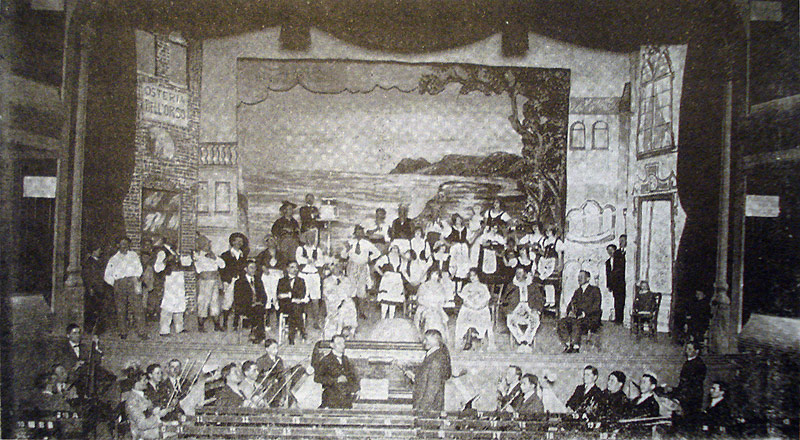
Scene from the operetta Don Pasticcio at the Cine Theatro Apollo, 1922

On June 1, 1910, Caxias was granted city status, and on the same day, the first train arrived, connecting the region to the state capital. In 1913, electric lighting was installed. Several economic cycles marked the municipality's evolution throughout the century. In its early decades, the initial subsistence-based economic model predominated. Commerce was boosted by the railway and the network of trading posts established by Germans, but Italians soon created their own channels for product distribution, generating significant capital that enabled larger-scale industrialization. Caxias do Sul became a major commercial and later industrial hub due to the production of wine, lard, and flour, with Porto Alegre as the main distribution point. Antônio Pierucinni and Abramo Eberle, wine and metallurgical product traders, were pioneers in opening markets in São Paulo. The Merchants' Association, founded in 1901, played a crucial role in the region and emerged as the most significant social force after the Intendancy and the Municipal Council. It maintained strict and efficient control over commerce, wielded significant influence with the authorities, intervened beneficially in economic crises and local infrastructure issues, and acted in the area of social assistance. Despite some internal crises and disputes with authorities, the Association led all matters related to the interests of the producing classes, even when they were purely agricultural, as all productive activities in this phase converged in commerce.

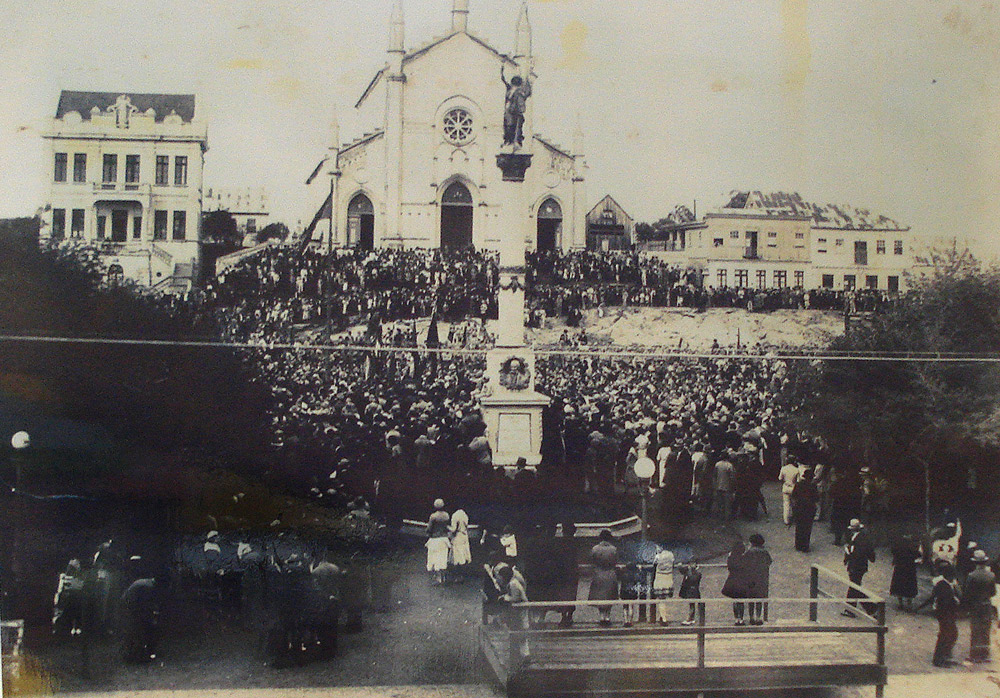
The Cathedral overlooking Dante Alighieri Square, at the laying of the cornerstone for a monument to the Duke of Caxias, 1933

Meanwhile, the local culture, while still rooted in the traditional family organization and its rural ties and close connection to the Catholic Church, began a process of refinement and secularization. With the end of the immigrant settlement phase, an urban elite emerged that was more informed, educated, and able to dedicate itself to leisure and culture in less folkloric and more cosmopolitan patterns, benefiting the general population as well. Social-recreational clubs offering cultural programs emerged, such as the Clube Juvenil and Recreio da Juventude, as well as amateur sports clubs such as Esporte Clube Juventude and Grêmio Esportivo Flamengo (now SER Caxias). Public education began to be structured, and in 1917, the first municipal library was created. The first theaters and cinema halls, such as Cinema Juvenil, Cine Theatro Apollo, and Cinema Central, brought the most up-to-date film productions of the time, provided space for traveling theater companies and local amateurs, and even hosted operatic groups. Also noteworthy is the creation in 1937 of the Tobias Barreto de Menezes Cultural Center, founded by Percy Vargas de Abreu e Lima, a prominent intellectual figure in the city, offering free evening courses in Humanities and Sciences open to the entire population, developing a range of other cultural activities, and serving as a hub for political discussion due to the socialist ideas of its founder. The city's current House of Culture bears his name.

=== Identity construction and social crisis ===
In 1925, the 50th anniversary of Italian immigration to Rio Grande do Sul was celebrated, a period highly conducive to initiating public recognition of the successes already achieved and consolidated, primarily aiming to integrate the colonial elites into the state's historical panorama, until then dominated by the pastoral-latifundist representations of Portuguese descendants. In this context, the Festa da Uva became the city's most significant secular event, linking the glorification of Italian labor with the festival's potential as an important economic forum. As Cleodes Ribeiro stated,

"If the liturgy of the Festa da Uva ritual served to proclaim the celebrants' identity, display the results of over half a century of work, and claim the status of Brazilians, its defining characteristics were expressed through the symbolic vocabulary used in the ritual. The speeches, the grape exhibitions and distributions, the triumphal procession, the vendors in their typical costumes, the songs, the banquets, the congress, and the flags decorating the streets all reflected the efforts of the festival's organizers in the process of self-representation."

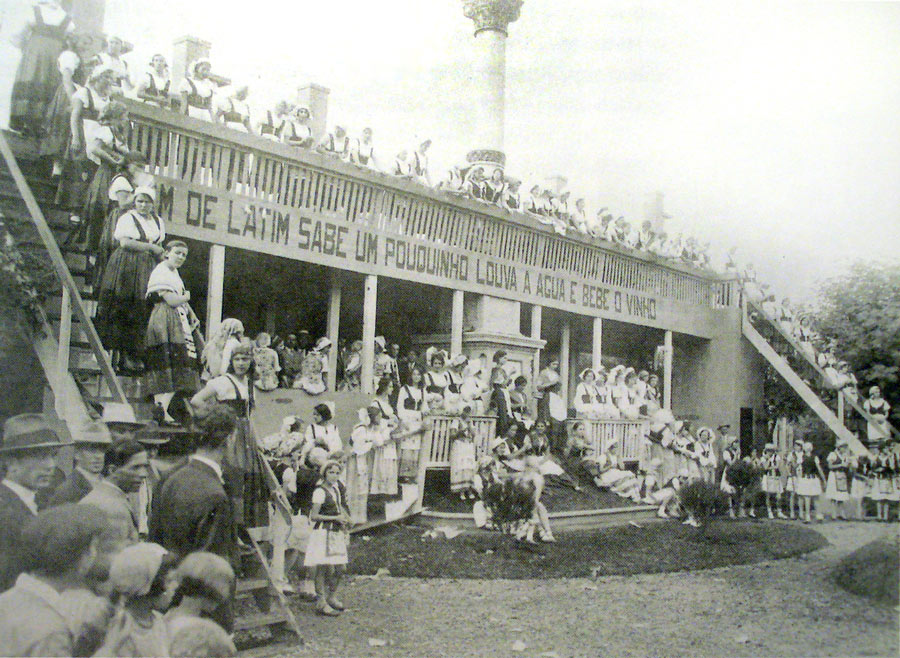
Pavilions of the Festa da Uva in 1932

At the same time, in Fascist Italy, there was growing interest in reconstructing the history of emigrants, interpreting it as a powerful civilizing contribution of the Latin race to the New World, urging Italians to defend and take pride in their ethnic origins. Benito Mussolini, in the prologue to the commemorative album Cinquantenario della Colonizzazione Italiana nello Stato del Rio Grande del Sud, declared: "In the noble pride that elevates your souls as you pause to contemplate the result of long and tenacious labor, I glimpse the sign of the noblest lineage that left an indelible mark on the history of Peoples."

This chauvinistic and racist stance, not free from foreign manipulation, was suppressed by the government of Getúlio Vargas, which adopted a nationalist development line, minimizing state autonomy and regional singularities that had formed in various regions of Brazil, including the south. At this point, the overly optimistic and confident self-image constructed by the Italians began to be dismantled, and instead of collaborators in Brazil's growth and settlement, immigrants came to be seen as potential enemies of the homeland. This process culminated with Brazil's entry into World War II alongside the Allies against the Axis powers, causing a profound rupture in ties between Italy and Brazil, with significant consequences for the immigration region. Between 1941 and 1944, anti-Italian demonstrations organized by the National Defense League sought to suppress the identifying symbols of the foreign ethnicity, creating an atmosphere of terror through various public acts of aggression. At the same time, Italians and their descendants were prohibited from speaking their dialect, forming a wall of silence around them, as many still struggled to express themselves in Portuguese. Their movement required safe-conduct passes, severely hindering their interaction with Brazilians at all levels. Such repression led to self-censorship efforts by Italians and their descendants, discouraging the cultivation of memory even in the privacy of the home and halting the celebration of the Festa da Uva from 1938. Those of other foreign ethnic origins, though fewer in number, faced similar treatment.

=== Reconciliation and resumed growth ===
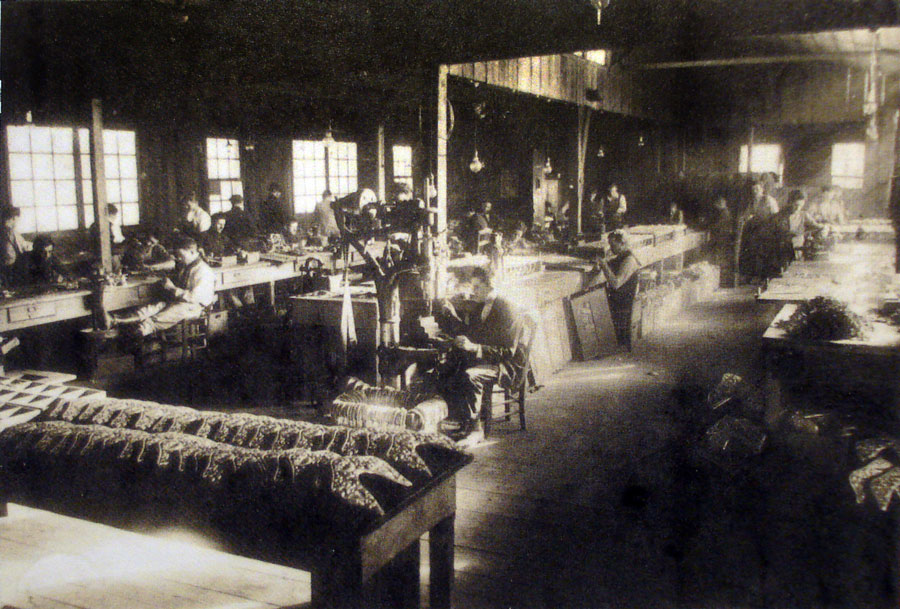
Abramo Eberle Metalworks facilities in the 1950s

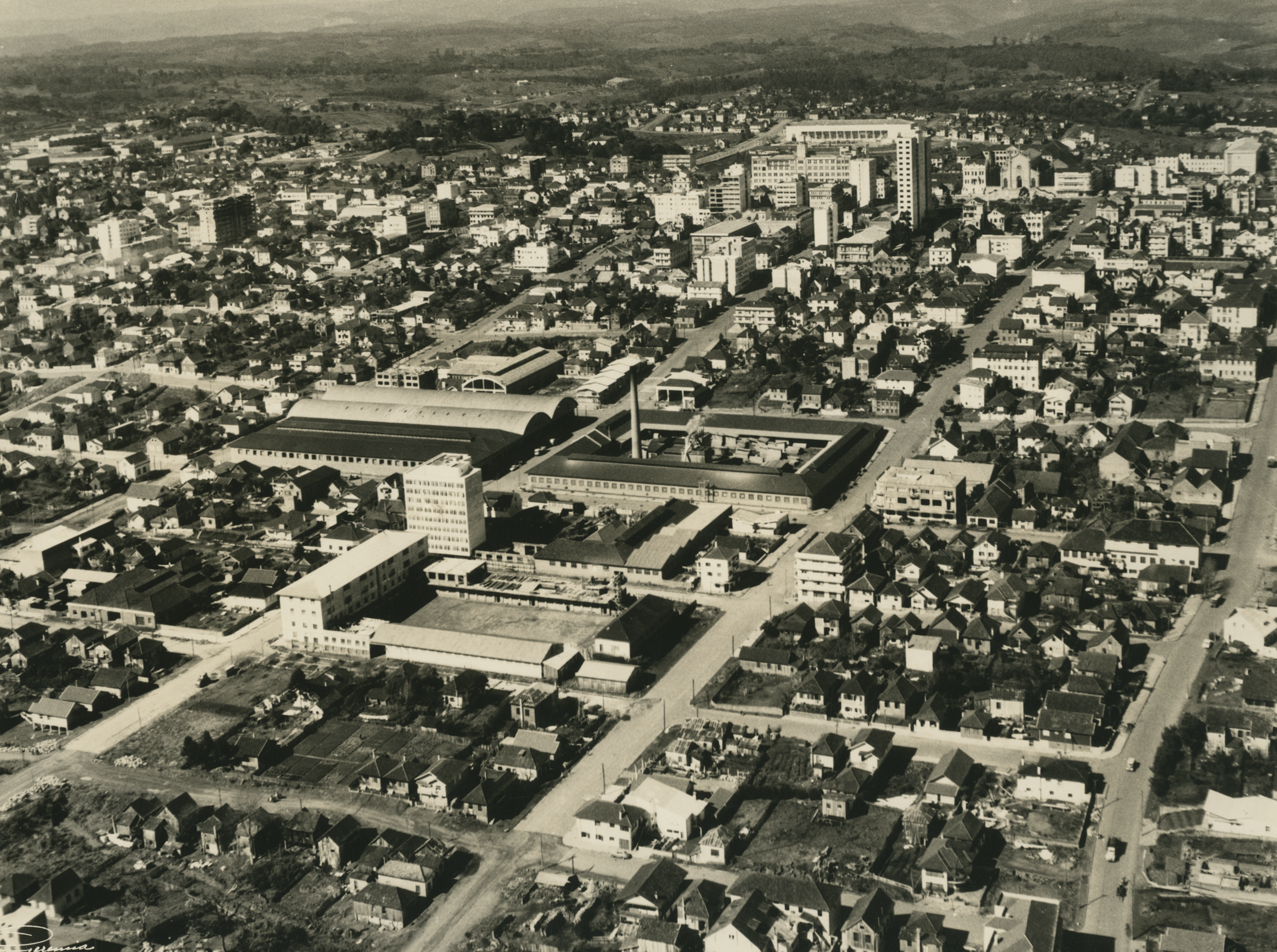
Caxias do Sul, 1970s. National Archives.

Upon the resumption of the Festa da Uva in 1950, coinciding with the 75th anniversary of immigration, in a spirit of reconciliation, immigrants began to be called pioneers, indicating a reorientation in the identity to be constructed, with progressive implications that opened up to non-Italians, now considered partners in the entire civilizing process. Another event of great symbolic significance was the construction of the Monument to the Immigrant, inaugurated in 1954 and later designated a national monument.

The city's economic development throughout the 20th century followed a pattern similar to Brazil's, using techniques and machinery developed in industrialized countries and adapting them to local conditions. In the second half of the century, major companies established branches in Porto Alegre, and the city developed significant trade in pork products, dairy, flour, timber, and the wine sector. The metallurgical industries also grew, initially leveraging artisanal work by blacksmiths, locksmiths, and tinsmiths, but by the 1950s, they adopted a modern industrial profile, primarily with capital derived from savings and the expansion of the establishments themselves. A distinguishing factor in Caxias' economic evolution was the formation of deep mutual trust within the community, the so-called social capital, enabling the organization of the economy on stronger foundations, accelerating the economic cycle, and achieving more significant results. The rapid diversification of the economy was also due to progressive urbanization and the failure of the colonial family smallholding system. The successive fragmentation of rural properties among multiple heirs rendered them unable to sustain large families, leading to rural exodus and transforming many former farmers into industrial and commercial workers.

Just as the first half of the 20th century represented an opening and greater integration of the city into the state and national context, the second half marked a phase of global outreach, with changes in its productive, political, and cultural profile, the beginning of penetration into foreign markets, and the consolidation of its position as one of Brazil's largest economies. The city grew rapidly during this period, increasing from a population of 54,000 in 1950 to 180,000 in 1975 and about 360,000 by 2000, bringing with it the social, cultural, economic, and environmental problems typical of Brazilian cities with high expansion rates. The city's industrial dynamism intensified from the 1970s, driven by a diversity of ventures ranging from transportation equipment, the most significant, to furniture, food products, metallurgy, clothing, footwear, and textiles, making it the second most important economic area in the state, attracting populations from other regions of Rio Grande do Sul and even other states. In recent years, the local economy has shown a significant shift in emphasis, with the tertiary sector gaining prominence and increasing computerization and automation in companies, infrastructure, environmental concerns, and the opening of new jobs and markets in various global contexts.

In 1994, the Northeast Rio Grande do Sul Urban Agglomeration was established, the second largest urban agglomeration in Rio Grande do Sul, notable for its population concentration and dynamic economic structure. From the fragmentation of the former Colônia Caxias emerged the current municipalities of Flores da Cunha, Farroupilha, and São Marcos. The municipality is also known by the nickname Pearl of the Colonies.

In 2017, the Talian language was officialized in the municipality of Caxias do Sul through a decree by the president of the Municipal Chamber of Councilors, Felipe Gremelmaier (PMDB). On October 10, 2019, a bill was approved recognizing Talian as an intangible cultural heritage of the municipality.

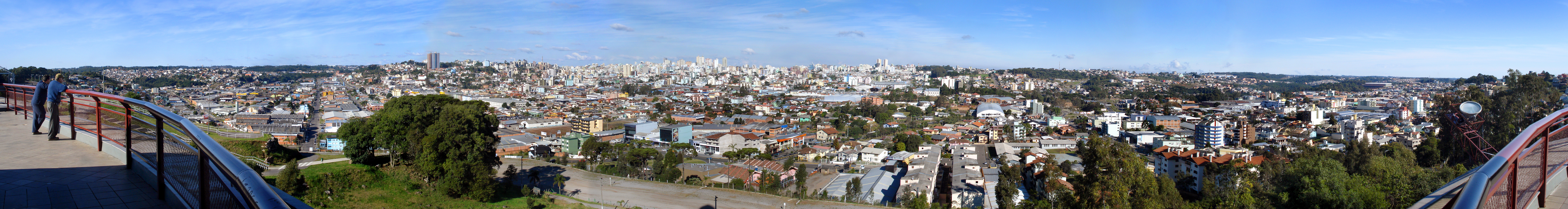
Panorama of Caxias do Sul viewed from the Festa da Uva hill

== Geography ==
Caxias do Sul is located in the state of Rio Grande do Sul. It is located at a longitude of 51º10'06 west and a latitude of 29º10'05 south. It belongs to the Northeast Rio Grande do Sul Mesoregion and the Caxias do Sul Microregion. According to the Siegfried Emanuel Heuser Foundation of Economics and Statistics, it has an area of 1,643.9 km^{2} (634.7 sq mi), 1,638.34 km^{2} (632.57 sq mi) according to Municipal Government data, or 1,644 km^{2} (635 sq mi) according to the IBGE. It is 127 km (79 mi) from the state capital, Porto Alegre, and 1,900 km (1,200 mi) from Brasília, the federal capital. It borders the municipalities of São Marcos, Campestre da Serra, and Monte Alegre dos Campos to the north, Vale Real, Nova Petrópolis, Gramado, and Canela to the south, São Francisco de Paula to the east, and Flores da Cunha and Farroupilha to the west.

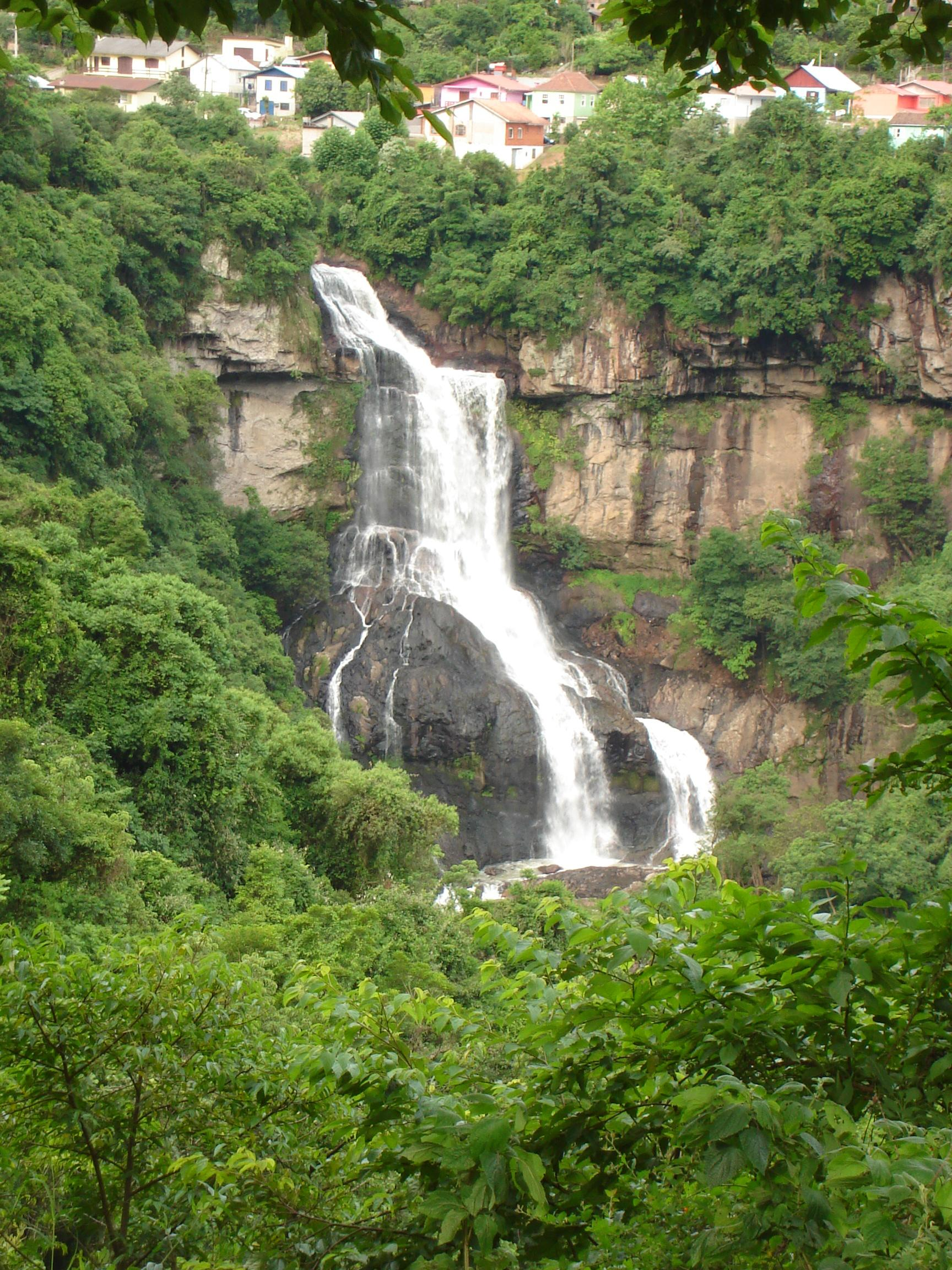
Véu da Noiva Waterfall, from the Pinhal Stream, in Galópolis

Located in the physiographic region of Rio Grande do Sul known as the Upper Northeast Slope, part of the Serra do Mar, the original urban core of the city was built on a peninsula-like extension of the Vacaria Plateau, an ancient basaltic outpouring over a granitic base, with a topography featuring a continuous but gentle slope from the border with Santa Catarina, with an average incline of about 2 m/km (11 ft/mi). Caxias do Sul is situated in the Taquari-Antas River Basin and the Caí River Basin, on a drainage divide between 740 and 820 meters in elevation, where the Vacaria Plateau begins to become rugged and fragment into various valleys dissected by small rivers and streams flowing south and west, tributaries of the Taquari River, those flowing south and southeast, tributaries of the Caí River, and those draining north, tributaries of the Antas, Pelotas, and São Marcos rivers.

The main watercourses in the city are the Maestra Stream (north-northeast), the Biondo Stream (northeast), the Caravaggio Stream (southwest), and the Pinhal Stream (south). This network of valleys has extensive interfluvial areas ranging from 50 to 60 km in width. To the south, however, there are smaller, relatively branched valleys with reduced interfluvial spaces ranging from 4 to 5 km in width. The interfluvial spaces of these southern valleys are generally at the same elevation as the Caxias Plateau, ranging between 670 and 790 meters, while the bottoms of the gorges, where red sandstones outcrop, are typically below 200 meters in elevation.

=== Environment ===
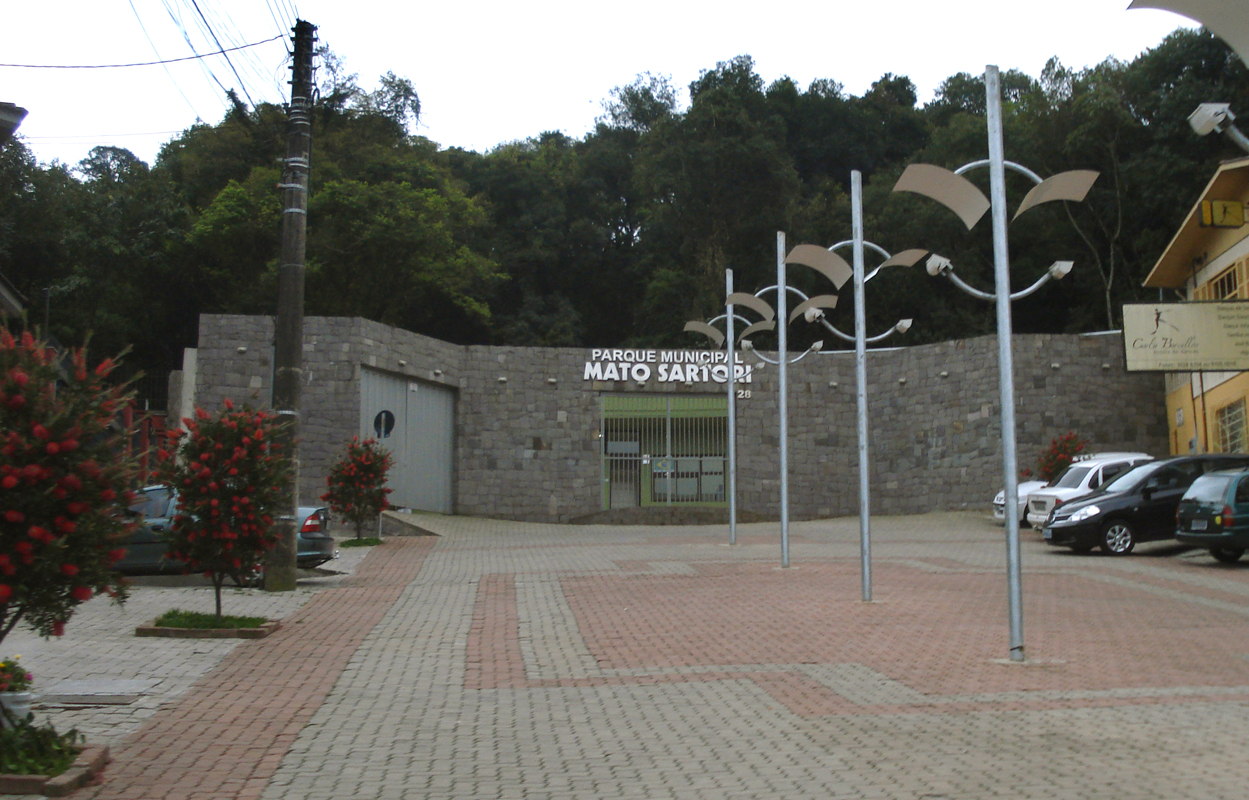
Entrance to the Mato Sartori Municipal Park

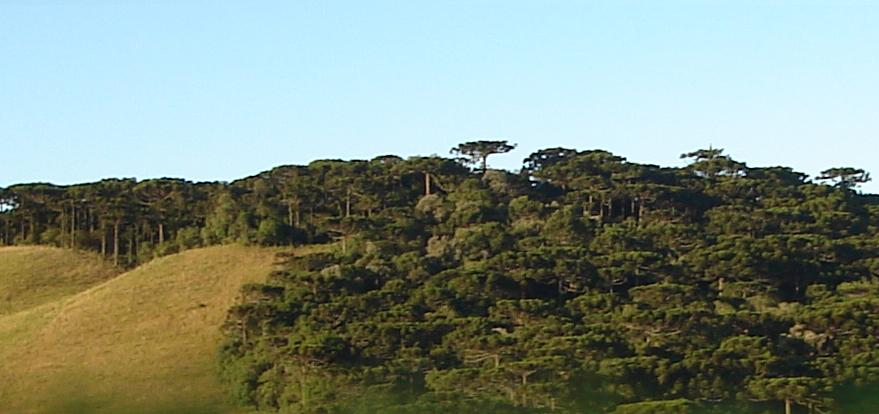
Araucaria forest in the interior of Caxias do Sul

The municipality of Caxias do Sul is located in the Atlantic Forest biome and is characterized by mixed ombrophilous forest vegetation. To the east, north, and northeast, the forest is interspersed with areas of low vegetation from the Campos de Cima da Serra, occurring in shallow soils. The landscape has been significantly altered due to agricultural and industrial activities and urban expansion, resulting in a substantial reduction in araucaria presence. The less rugged the terrain, the more extensive the patches of fields, and conversely, the more dynamic the terrain forms, the denser and more continuous the araucaria forests, especially at the headwaters of the main valleys. The lower valley areas are covered by a transitional slope forest, known as the Fig Tree Forest, with greater botanical diversity. The soils, formed over the basaltic layer, are generally very fertile.

The city has an IBAMA office, and the Municipal Government implements and oversees extensive environmental legislation created by the Chamber. It maintains a Secretariat of the Environment responsible for actions to preserve and manage natural resources. Among its activities are environmental education programs such as Plant a Tree, Araucaria Repopulation, Environmental Conferences, Ecological Calendar, Environmental Olympics, Environment Week, and others. The city has an average of 17.32 m^{2} of green space per inhabitant, with 46 squares and several other green spaces and environmental preservation areas, such as the small Mato Sartori near the center, the 186,000 hectares around the Caxias do Sul Water Catchment Basin in the Fazenda Souza district, the largest environmental preservation area for water extraction in the Atlantic Forest, and the Rincão das Flores Sanitary Landfill, which dedicates most of its 275.8 hectares to preservation. Several parks feature native flora and urbanized areas with sports and leisure facilities, including Macaquinhos Park, Cinquentenário Park, and Dr. Celeste Gobatto Park. There is also a 50-hectare Botanical Garden, preserving local flora while facilitating the recovery of degraded areas through collection and reproduction.

==== Environmental issues ====
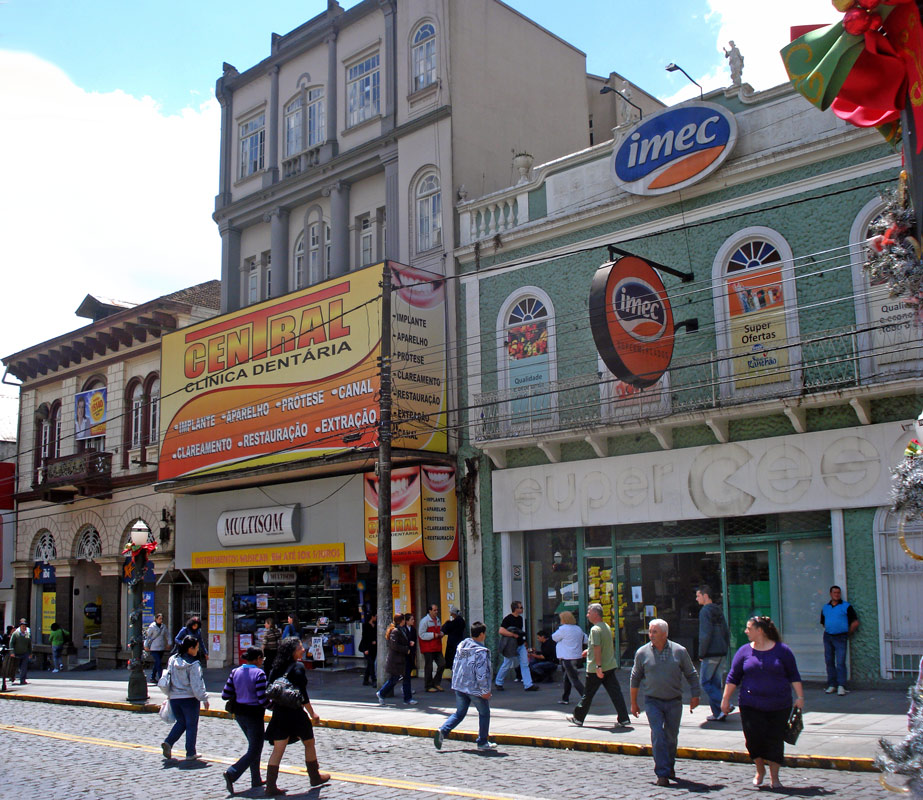
Deterioration of historic buildings in the city center due to heavy visual pollution

One of the city's environmental problems is pollution. The waters of the Taquari River's tributaries are contaminated with pesticides, domestic sewage, and industrial effluents, and the city's sewage is the main contributor to the pollution of the Caí River basin. However, the Municipal Government has made significant investments in water depollution programs. Noise pollution has shown concerning occurrences but is being addressed with special legislation.

Visual pollution in the downtown area is intense, affecting even listed historic buildings. To mitigate this issue, Complementary Law No. 412 of June 12, 2012, established a series of rules for visual communication in the city. Among other measures, the law sets a maximum size limit for signs, billboards, or banners used on business facades. As a result, many historic facades were revealed after the removal of advertisements.

The air pollution levels are unknown due to the deactivation of monitoring equipment since 2006.

Despite legal protection for the Atlantic Forest, deforestation and burning continue to occur in the Caxias do Sul region, often covertly, in slopes and hard-to-access areas, with exotic species such as pine and black wattle planted to supply the timber and paper markets, leaving a belt of native vegetation as camouflage, or clearing space for crops. Another cause of deforestation is the commercial devaluation of land with significant protected forest cover, which theoretically prevents more intensive exploitation. Monitoring exists, conducted by land and air by the Caxias do Sul Environmental Patrol (Patram), linked to the Military Brigade, but the 18 soldiers are insufficient to cover the large area under their jurisdiction, which includes 13 cities.

In recent years, landslides and flooding have been reported, caused, respectively, by the inappropriate occupation of slopes with fragile soil cover and by soil impermeabilization and poorly planned urbanization in areas naturally prone to flooding. Sometimes posing serious threats to the population's lives, these disasters generally affect the poorer classes, driven to settle in areas unsuitable for urbanization.

=== Climate ===
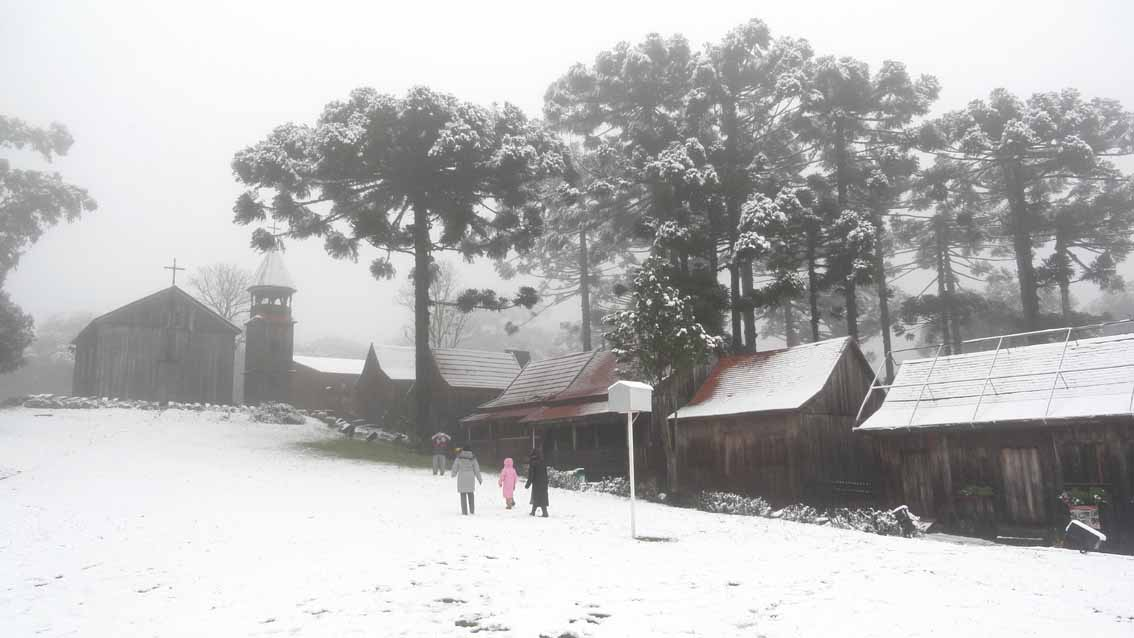
Snow covering the Festa da Uva Exhibition Park, with the replica of old Caxias, on August 27, 2013

The climate of Caxias do Sul is oceanic (Cfb), with relatively warm summers, relatively cold winters, and occasional frost, more frequent in higher altitude and less urbanized areas in the eastern part of the city. Snow may occur in the colder months, but it is a much rarer phenomenon and, when it occurs, is generally light. However, relatively heavy snowfalls with significant accumulations have been recorded, the most recent on August 26–27, 2013 and July 28, 2021.

The average annual compensated temperature of the municipality is 17 °C (63 °F), with significant thermal amplitude annually. In terms of precipitation, the area receives 1,800 mm (71 in) of rainfall, which is distributed evenly throughout the year, with no dry season. Accumulated precipitation has reached 105 mm (4.1 in) in twelve hours. Occasionally, episodes of strong wind occur, with gusts exceeding 100 km/h (62 mph), and in 2009, a tornado was recorded.

According to data from the National Institute of Meteorology (INMET), since 1931, the lowest temperature recorded in Caxias do Sul was −6.4 °C (20.5 °F) on June 24, 1945, although the historical record low was recorded before this period, on July 11, 1918, when the city experienced a minimum temperature of −6.9 °C (19.6 °F). The record high temperature was 37.5 °C (99.5 °F) on November 16, 1985. The highest daily precipitation accumulation in 24 hours reached 192.4 millimetres (7.57 in) on May 2, 2024, surpassing the 176.9 millimetres (6.96 in) recorded on June 28, 1982. May 2024, with 845.3 millimetres (33.28 in), is the wettest month in the historical series, followed by November 2023 (478.7 millimetres (18.85 in)), September 2023 (437.2 millimetres (17.21 in)), and September 1967 (434.9 millimetres (17.12 in)).

Climate data for Caxias do Sul
Month	Jan	Feb	Mar	Apr	May	Jun	Jul	Aug	Sep	Oct	Nov	Dec	Year
Record high °C (°F)	36.0 (96.8)	35.4 (95.7)	35.0 (95.0)	31.4 (88.5)	28.4 (83.1)	26.6 (79.9)	28.5 (83.3)	30.4 (86.7)	32.5 (90.5)	33.0 (91.4)	37.5 (99.5)	35.6 (96.1)	37.5 (99.5)
Mean daily maximum °C (°F)	26.6 (79.9)	26.5 (79.7)	25.3 (77.5)	22.3 (72.1)	18.7 (65.7)	17.3 (63.1)	16.9 (62.4)	19.1 (66.4)	19.6 (67.3)	21.9 (71.4)	24.2 (75.6)	25.9 (78.6)	22.0 (71.6)
Daily mean °C (°F)	21.2 (70.2)	21.0 (69.8)	19.9 (67.8)	17.3 (63.1)	14.1 (57.4)	12.7 (54.9)	12.1 (53.8)	13.4 (56.1)	14.2 (57.6)	16.7 (62.1)	18.4 (65.1)	20.0 (68.0)	16.8 (62.2)
Mean daily minimum °C (°F)	17.3 (63.1)	17.4 (63.3)	16.4 (61.5)	13.8 (56.8)	11.1 (52.0)	9.5 (49.1)	8.7 (47.7)	9.7 (49.5)	10.4 (50.7)	12.7 (54.9)	14.3 (57.7)	16.0 (60.8)	13.1 (55.6)
Record low °C (°F)	5.0 (41.0)	5.0 (41.0)	4.0 (39.2)	−0.8 (30.6)	−3.0 (26.6)	−6.4 (20.5)	−5.6 (21.9)	−5.0 (23.0)	−2.2 (28.0)	0.2 (32.4)	2.0 (35.6)	3.5 (38.3)	−6.4 (20.5)
Average precipitation mm (inches)	158.5 (6.24)	154.9 (6.10)	111.3 (4.38)	120.4 (4.74)	140.9 (5.55)	156.0 (6.14)	189.4 (7.46)	145.1 (5.71)	163.1 (6.42)	178.7 (7.04)	143.9 (5.67)	140.5 (5.53)	1,802.7 (70.97)
Average precipitation days	13	11	10	9	10	10	11	10	10	12	11	11	128
Average relative humidity (%)	77.4	78.3	79.9	80.3	81.6	81.4	78.4	74.4	76.3	78.1	76.1	75.3	78.1
Mean monthly sunshine hours	204.0	185.5	191.5	168.3	150.4	127.1	143.6	146.3	145.4	163.3	199.2	187.5	2,012.1
Source: INMET (1981–2010 climatological normals; temperature records: 1931–present)

=== Demographics ===
The municipality is a regional hub for migration and accounts for 40% of the population of the Northeast Rio Grande do Sul Urban Agglomeration (AUNe), with growth rates between 25% and 30% per decade. The AUNe comprises the municipalities of Bento Gonçalves, Carlos Barbosa, Caxias do Sul, Farroupilha, Flores da Cunha, Garibaldi, Monte Belo do Sul, Nova Pádua, Santa Tereza, and São Marcos. In 2010, the AUNe had a population of 716,421 inhabitants.

According to the Brazilian Institute of Geography and Statistics (IBGE), in 2022, Caxias do Sul had a population of 463,338 inhabitants. In 2010, the previous census year, the total population of the municipality was 435,564 inhabitants, with a population density of 264.89 inhabitants/km^{2}.

In 2000, the life expectancy at birth was 74.11 years, and the infant mortality rate in 2007 was 9.04 per thousand live births. In 2000, the urbanization rate was 92.5%, with 92.5% of the population living in urban areas. The age structure showed 25.18% of the population under 15 years, 69.16% between 15 and 64 years, and the remainder over 65 years. Additionally, 97.9% had access to refrigerators, 97.3% to televisions, 59.9% to telephones, and 17.7% to computers. The Human Development Index was 0.857, ranking the city 12th among Brazilian municipalities and 4th in the state. The Gini coefficient, an indicator of social inequality, was 0.51, indicating high income concentration, with a poverty rate of 7.5%. Regarding family vulnerability indicators, 0.1% of girls aged 10 to 14 had children, 5.3% of youths aged 15 to 17 had children, 12.7% of children lived in families with income below half the minimum wage, and 4% of families were headed by women without a spouse and with minor children. Additionally, 12.7% of families had a per capita income below half the minimum wage, and in 15.9% of families, the head had less than 4 years of education.

In 2007, the ethnic composition of the resident population was 88.94% White, 2.43% Black, 7.94% Pardo, 0.10% Asian, 0.24% Indigenous, and 0.36% of undeclared ethnicity. Regarding religion, 86.19% declared themselves members of the Roman Catholic Church; 1.78% adhered to mission-oriented evangelical denominations (mostly Lutherans, at 0.86%, followed by Adventists, at 0.54%); 6.05% were Pentecostals (predominantly belonging to the Assembly of God, at 2.48%, followed by the Universal Church of the Kingdom of God, at 1.31%); 1.40% identified as Spiritists, 0.38% as Umbandists, 0.03% as followers of Candomblé, 0.01% as Jews, and 0.02% as Muslims, alongside a large number of other faiths in smaller fractions. Additionally, 1.72% reported having no religion. According to the 2022 Brazilian census, 63.37% of the city's population identified as Catholic, 17.07% as Evangelical or Protestant, 2.73% as Spiritist, 2.33% as followers of Umbanda or Candomblé, 0.01% as followers of a traditional religion, 3.5% as followers of another religion, 5.93% as irreligious, 0.02% as other, and 0.04% as undeclared.

== Politics and administration ==
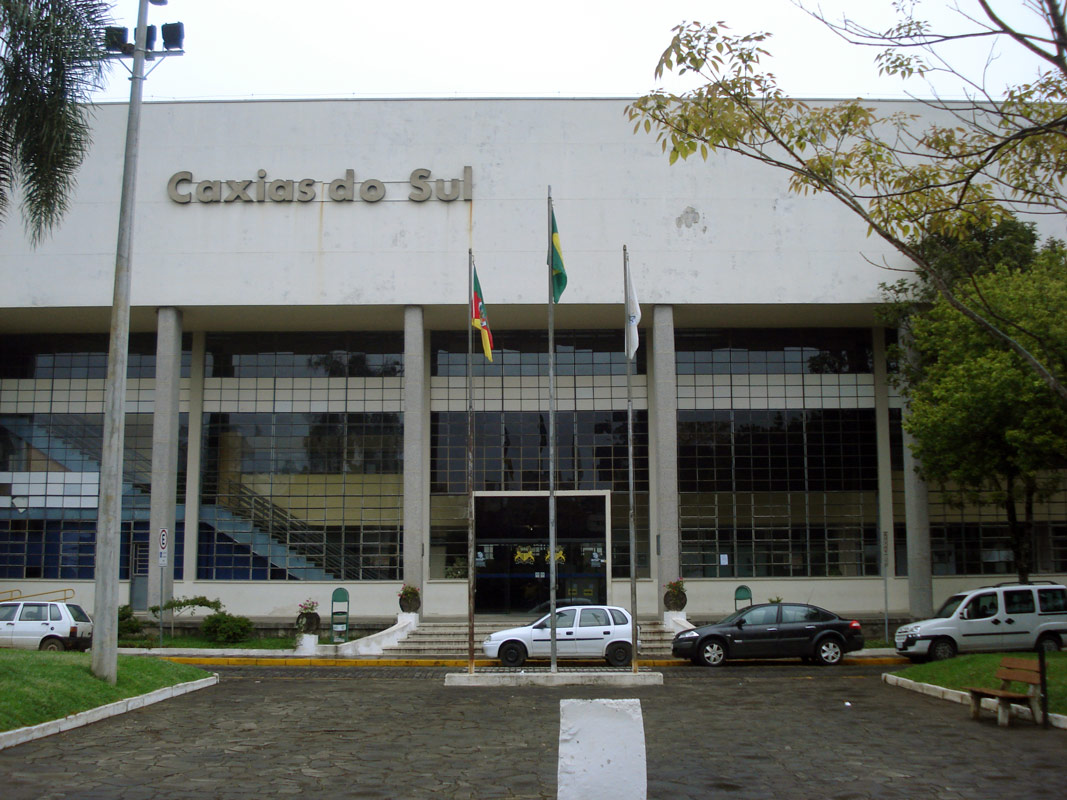
City Hall of Caxias do Sul

The local executive power is represented by the mayor of the municipality, along with their secretaries, coordinators, and directors. Administration is shared by the mayor with ten sub-mayors. The city is divided into 65 neighborhoods, 6 rural districts, and 15 administrative regions: Centro, Santa Lúcia, Fátima, Cruzeiro, Esplanada, Desvio Rizzo, Forqueta, Ana Rech, Galópolis, Serrano, Planalto, Presidente Vargas, São Giacomo, Nossa Senhora da Saúde, and Santa Fé. The municipal government employed the participatory budgeting system (OP), locally called Orçamento Comunitário, between 1997 and 2016, which was later replaced by the Community Relations sector. The OP, a program that invites the population to participate in discussions and decisions regarding the allocation of public funds, was marked in the municipality by political disputes and difficulties in completing projects. Among the activities included in the 2010 edition were street paving (the majority of requests), urbanizing squares, school renovations, building community centers, sports courts, playgrounds, addressing flooding issues, sewer channeling, and many others.

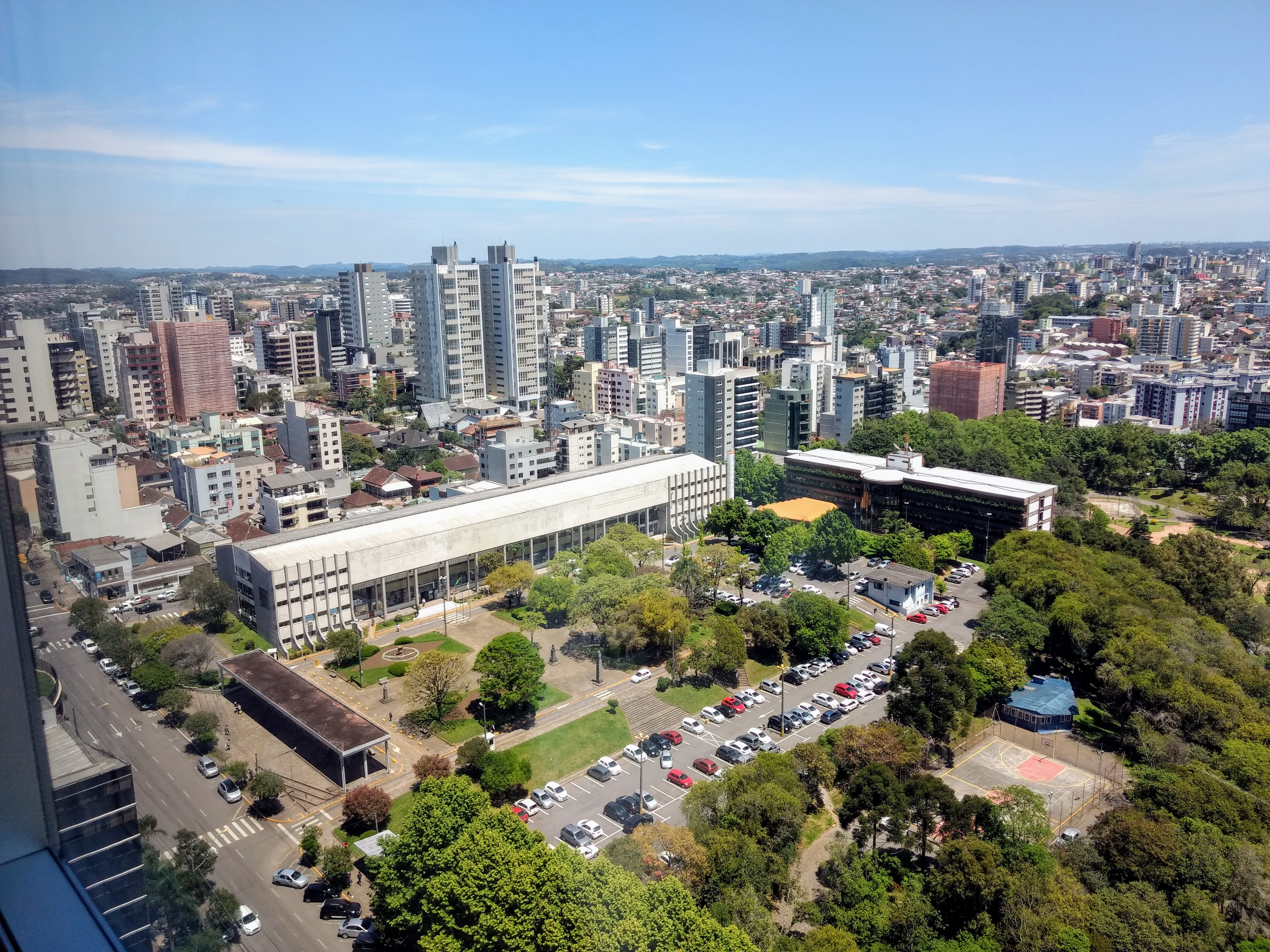
Aerial view of the City Hall and the City Council

The legislative power is represented by the Municipal Chamber. In the 2025-2028 legislature, the Chamber consists of 23 councilors: 5 from PL, 3 from PT, 2 from PCdoB, 2 from PDT, 2 from PSB, 2 from PSDB, 2 from PP, 2 from the Republicans, 1 from Novo, 1 from PSD, and 1 from PRD. The board of directors is chaired by Councilor Lucas Caregnato (PT). The judicial power is represented by the Court of the Comarca of Caxias do Sul. In 2024, Caxias do Sul had 347,100 voters, distributed across 1,110 polling stations in 163 voting locations, organized into three electoral zones: 16th (54 locations), 136th (54 locations), and 169th (55 locations).

== Economy ==
The municipal GDP is estimated at 22.3 billion reais (2014). The per capita GDP in 2011 was 37,700 reais. In 2007, public finances recorded budget revenues of 694,582,143.80 reais and expenditures of 645,802,901.80 reais, resulting in a surplus of 48,779,242.00 reais. Agriculture accounts for only 1.70% of the Gross Value Added, with industry contributing 40.79% and services 57.51%. In 2007, there were 30,068 companies of all economic categories in operation. In 2005, the city had an Economically Active Population (EAP) of approximately 150,000 workers, but only 55% were in the formal labor market. The industry sector employed the largest share, with 58.61%, two-thirds of which were in the metalworking industry. In the informal sector, small-scale industries such as knitwear, food production, clothing manufacturing, and low-tech services (repairs, domestic work, cleaning) were prominent.

In 2005, the city achieved the highest Socioeconomic Development Index (Idese) in Rio Grande do Sul for the sixth consecutive year, with a score of 0.844. It was the only municipality in the state during this period to have four of the Idese components—education, income, health, sanitation, and housing—above 0.800. In recent years, Caxias do Sul's economy has shown strong performance, with 10,779 new jobs created between January and July 2010, setting a national record.

In the first half of 2010, the local economy achieved results equivalent to Brazil's full-year projections. The 12-month cumulative index exceeded 7%, reaching 19% for the semester. In June, performance grew by 20.8% compared to the same month the previous year, with positive expectations for the following year, though possibly at a slower pace. The industry sector saw increases in working hours, purchases, sales, and payroll, while the services sector led with a 10.1% rise over 12 months and 13.4% for the year. However, the commerce sector, despite growth, faced losses, though delinquency rates decreased.

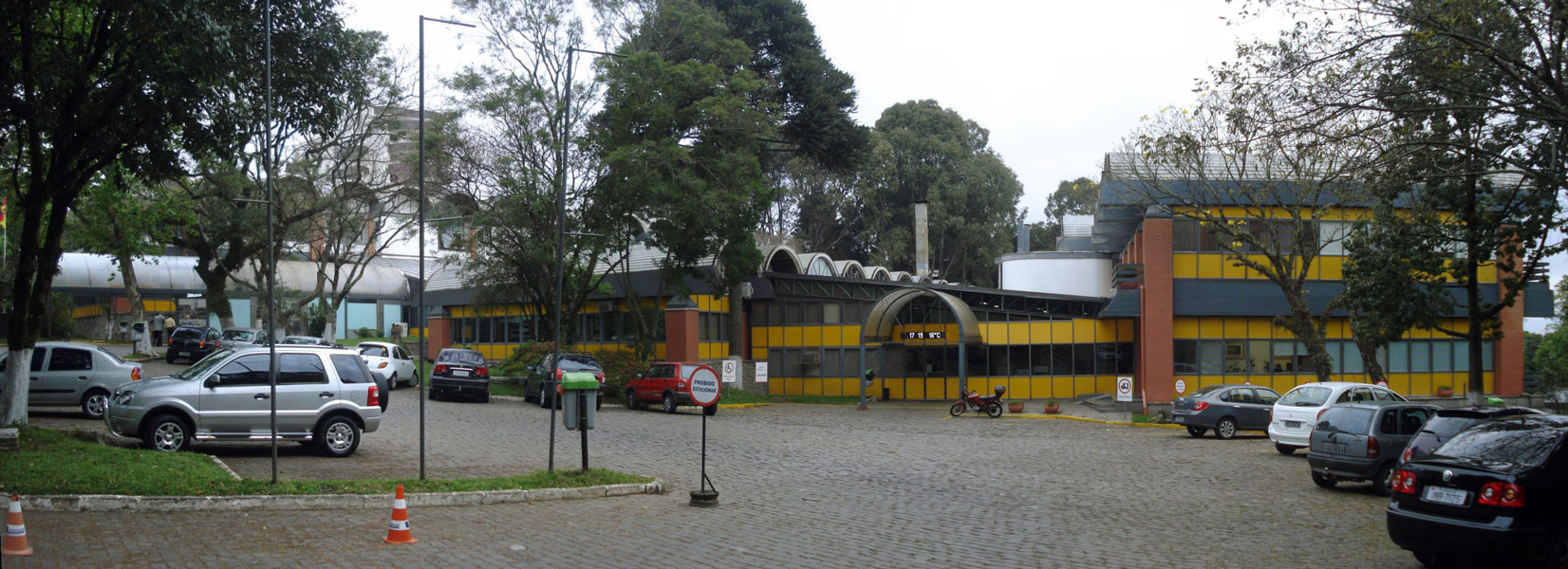
Headquarters of the Caxias do Sul Chamber of Industry, Commerce, and Services

The Caxias do Sul Chamber of Industry, Commerce, and Services represents over 1,000 legal entities of micro, small, medium, and large sizes across industry, commerce, and services, making it the largest association of its kind in the state's interior. The public administration also invests in various economic development programs, including Solidarity Economy Programs, Local Productive Arrangements (APLs), Recyclers' Associations, the IT Cluster, the Fashion Cluster, the Metalworking Cluster, the Serra Gaúcha Credit Guarantee Association (AGC), the Community Credit Institution (ICC – People's Bank), and numerous projects, agreements, programs, and partnerships with various public and private entities.

=== Agriculture ===
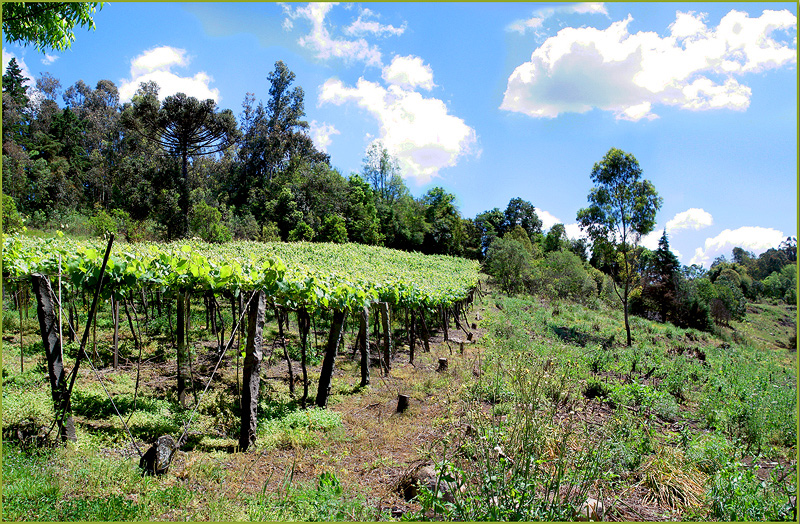
A vineyard in the rural area

The 2006 Agricultural Census reported 2,712 individual agricultural producers managing 74,418 hectares, 278 partnerships or consortia (7,379 ha), 5 cooperatives (379 ha), and 56 producers in corporations (3,747 ha). Of the land, 9,039 ha were used for permanent crops, 5,882 ha for temporary crops, 30,948 ha for natural pastures, and 1,778 ha for planted pastures in good condition. In 2008, the most significant livestock included 39,494 cattle, producing 9,833,000 liters of milk, 26,838 pigs, 15,694 quails producing 75,000 eggs, and 700,377 chickens, yielding 12,283,000 dozen eggs, along with 5,572,086 roosters, hens, and chicks. Additionally, 59,870 kg of honey were produced. In terms of agriculture, 2008 production highlights included apples (117,450 tons, valued at 74.9 million reais), grapes (66,600 tons, valued at 41.7 million reais), and tomatoes (36,900 tons, valued at 32.3 million reais). Other less significant crops included maize (18,000 tons), persimmon (8,100 tons), onion (4,500 tons), orange (2,220 tons), peach (3,556 tons), and various others in smaller quantities. Also notable were the production of firewood (31,216 m^{3}) and timber logs (81,060 m^{3}).

=== Industry, commerce, and construction ===
In 2007, the industrial sector comprised 5,872 establishments, with the following distribution: transportation equipment (26.86%), textiles, clothing, and fabric products (16.30%), food products, beverages, and ethanol (11.74%), machinery (11.48%), and chemicals for pharmaceuticals, veterinary products, and perfumery (9.94%). Caxias do Sul is Brazil's second-largest metalworking hub and, after facing a recession in 2009, the sector is recovering. The city hosts the Brazilian Mechanical and Industrial Automation Fair, in its 17th edition in 2010, expected to generate 100 million reais in business. Another significant event is the Subcontracting and Industrial Innovation Fair (Mercopar), which in 2009 generated 64 million reais in business, with exhibitors from Brazil and abroad and 31,000 visitors.

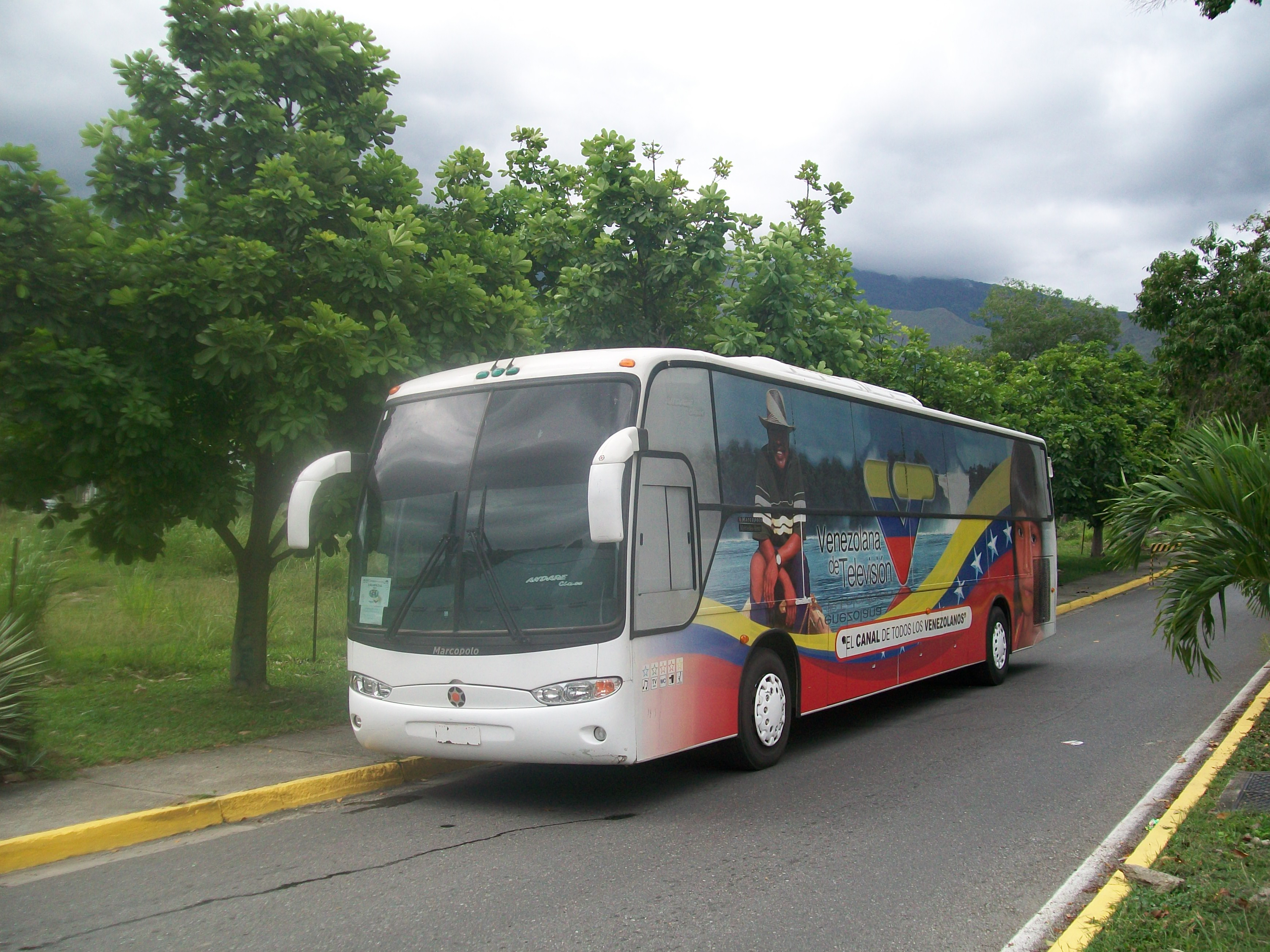
Marcopolo Andare Class bus

The city is home to 20 of the 500 largest companies in southern Brazil and has several industries among the largest in Brazil in their fields, including Randon, a conglomerate in the vehicle sector, whose companies frequently win the Prêmio Exportação RS, Agrale, a truck and bus manufacturer, Chies & Chies Ltda., a leader in the furniture sector, Marcopolo, producing more than half of the bus bodies manufactured in the country, Intral, a leader in the manufacture of components, ballasts, and high-performance light fixtures, and Gazola S/A Indústria Metalúrgica, a pioneer in manufacturing stainless steel household goods.

The construction sector has also experienced growth in recent years. In 2008, contractors and builders had to recruit labor from outside the state to meet demand, with the highest activity levels since tracking began in 1991. According to the Municipal Urban Planning Secretariat, between January and May 2010, 479,454 m^{2} of construction was approved, 58.48% more than in the same period of 2009. However, construction costs in the city are considered high, driven by workers' wages, which are among the highest in the country. The city hosts Construfair, the largest national construction materials fair. The 2010 edition was expected to feature 300 exhibitors and attract 45,000 visitors.

Commerce accounts for 20% of the municipal GDP, generating approximately 2 billion reais annually. Between 2007 and 2008, exports grew by 22.40% and imports by 81.64%. In 2008, exports increased by 32.46%, and imports by 65.98%. Caxias has significantly contributed to Brazil's foreign market growth, surpassing 1 billion dollars in annual exports, with a trade surplus exceeding 670 million dollars. In 2003, the financial system was served by 68 bank branches and 34 financial institutions, employing 1,138 people.

== Infrastructure ==
=== Water, sanitation, energy, and housing ===
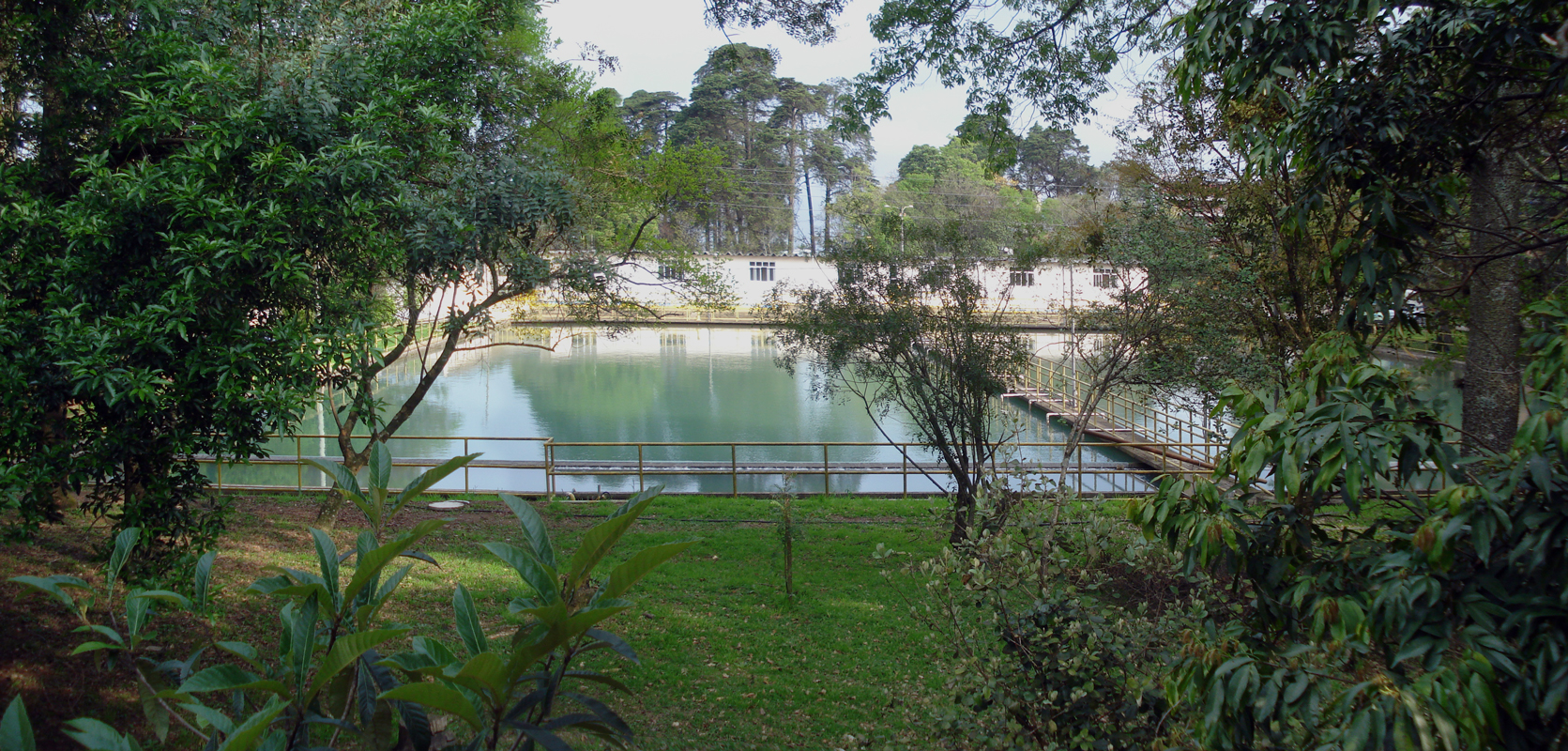
Water treatment and distribution station in the Lourdes neighborhood

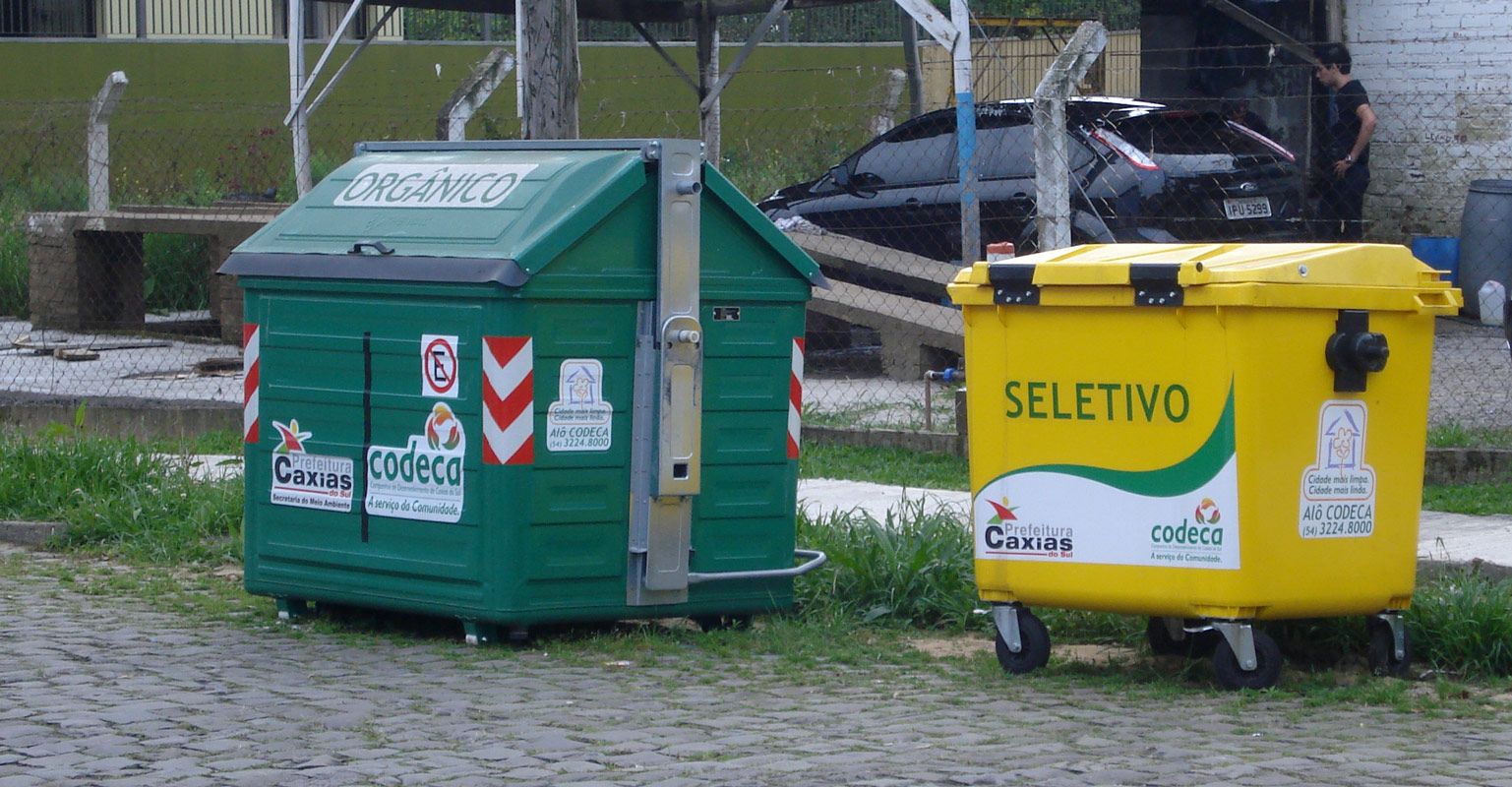
Waste sorting bins

The city lacks large natural rivers or lakes, and water is sourced from reservoirs built to capture the flow of small streams. Water supply is managed by the Municipal Water and Sewage Service (SAMAE). According to the agency, 100% of the urban population and 99.5% of the total municipal population receive water, sourced from the Faxinal, Maestra, Samuara, Dal Bó, Galópolis systems, and artesian wells. The Marrecas system is under development to meet future demand.

Attention to sewage is relatively recent in the city, which historically prioritized water supply. Sewage was previously collected in private septic tanks or discharged into the stormwater system. A collection and treatment system began operating effectively in 1997. Until recently, only a small percentage of the population was served by sewage collection, but all collected sewage was treated. Recent progress has been notable, with a study by the Instituto Trata Brasil highlighting performance above the national average. In 2009, 79.7% of municipal households had sewage collected through a 1,345-km network, though only 13.6% of the total volume was treated. SAMAE has undertaken major treatment system projects to improve this, aiming to treat 86% of sewage by the end of 2012. Awareness campaigns are also conducted.

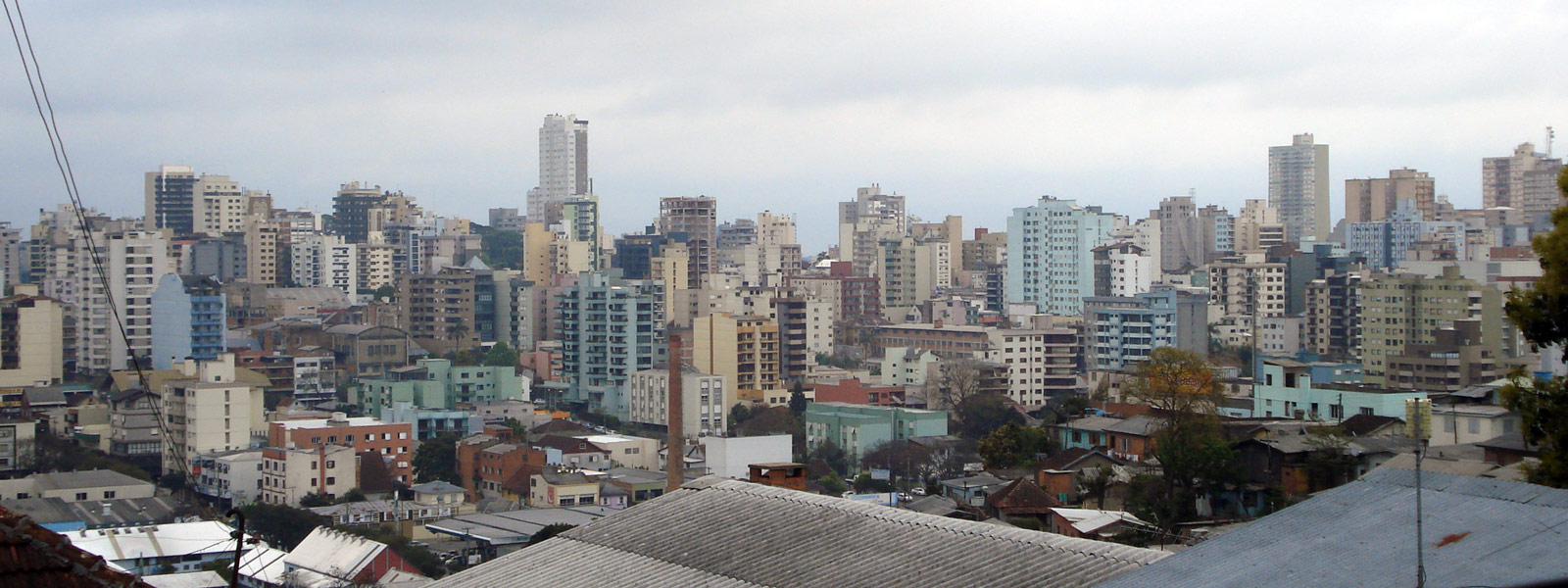
City center with dense urbanization

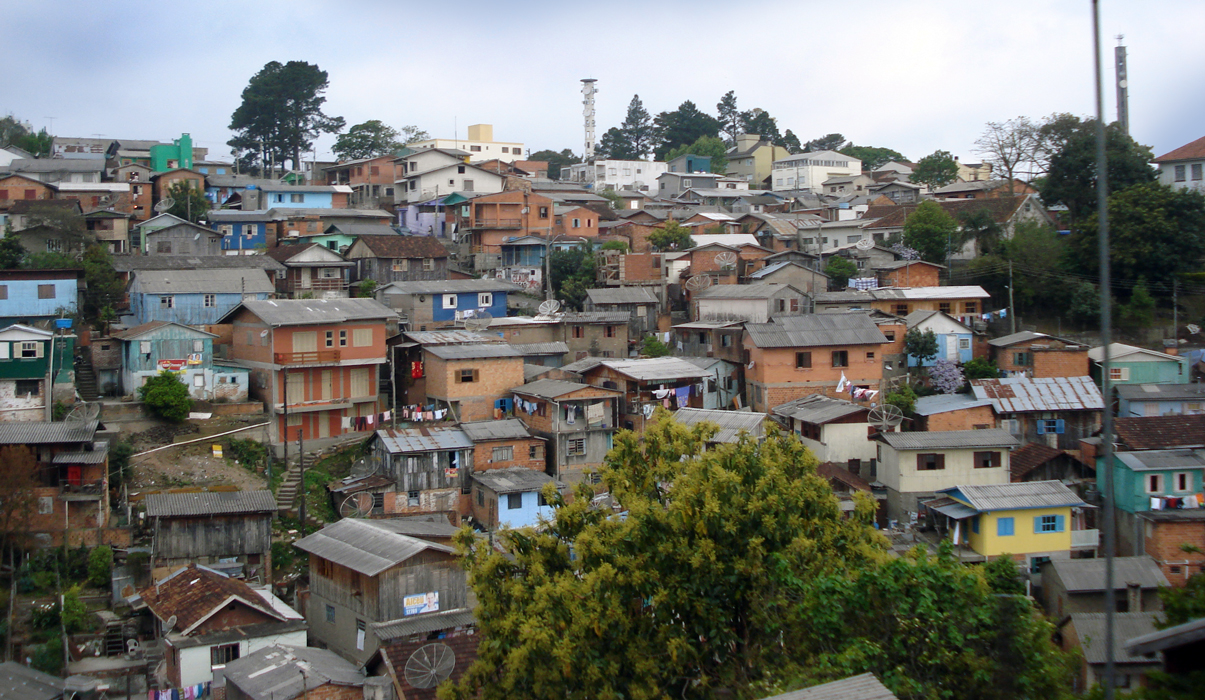
The so-called Buraco Quente, a slum area near the city center

Waste collection is managed by the Caxias do Sul Development Company (CODECA), a mixed-economy company. Waste is sorted daily in the urban center and every two days in less populated neighborhoods, covering 100% of households. Domestic waste is disposed of in a sanitary landfill authorized by the State Environmental Protection Foundation (FEPAM), where it is treated by the municipality. Nine recyclers' associations sort and sell dry waste, while industrial, hospital, and laboratory waste is the responsibility of the respective emitters.

Electricity is distributed by Rio Grande Energia (RGE), serving the north-northeast of the state. The network operates at 220V, with higher-power lines managed by CEEE. In 2003, 137,530 registered consumers were served. The city also has a natural gas supply, fueling approximately 1,800 vehicles daily.

In 2000, there were 109,396 registered private households, with 83,677 owned (74,037 fully paid) and 17,391 rented. As a regional hub, the city attracts large numbers of migrants that the housing infrastructure cannot accommodate, settling in slums, irregular settlements, and risk zones, forming pockets of poverty with limited access to essential services such as sanitation and education, contrasting with areas that have full urban infrastructure. A survey conducted in 1994 identified 110 substandard housing units, in which 3,596 families were living in inadequate conditions. By 2005, this number was estimated to have risen to 7,000 families. The municipality maintains several housing projects, land regularization, and lot acquisition initiatives, carried out through community participation and partnerships with various governmental and non-governmental organizations.

==== Healthcare ====
In 2005, there were 139 healthcare facilities, 46 public and 17 private but affiliated with SUS. Eleven offered full hospitalization, 89 provided full outpatient care (51 via SUS), 39 offered dental care, 12 had emergency services, and 3 had intensive care units. The total number of beds was 1,292. Major hospitals, all with over 100 beds and specializing in areas such as pediatrics, surgery, gynecology-obstetrics, psychiatry, oncology, internal medicine, neurology, orthopedics, and others, include Our Lady of Pompeii Hospital, Presidente Vargas General Hospital, Saúde Hospital, Virvi Ramos Hospital, Círculo Saúde Hospital, and Unimed Hospital Caxias do Sul.

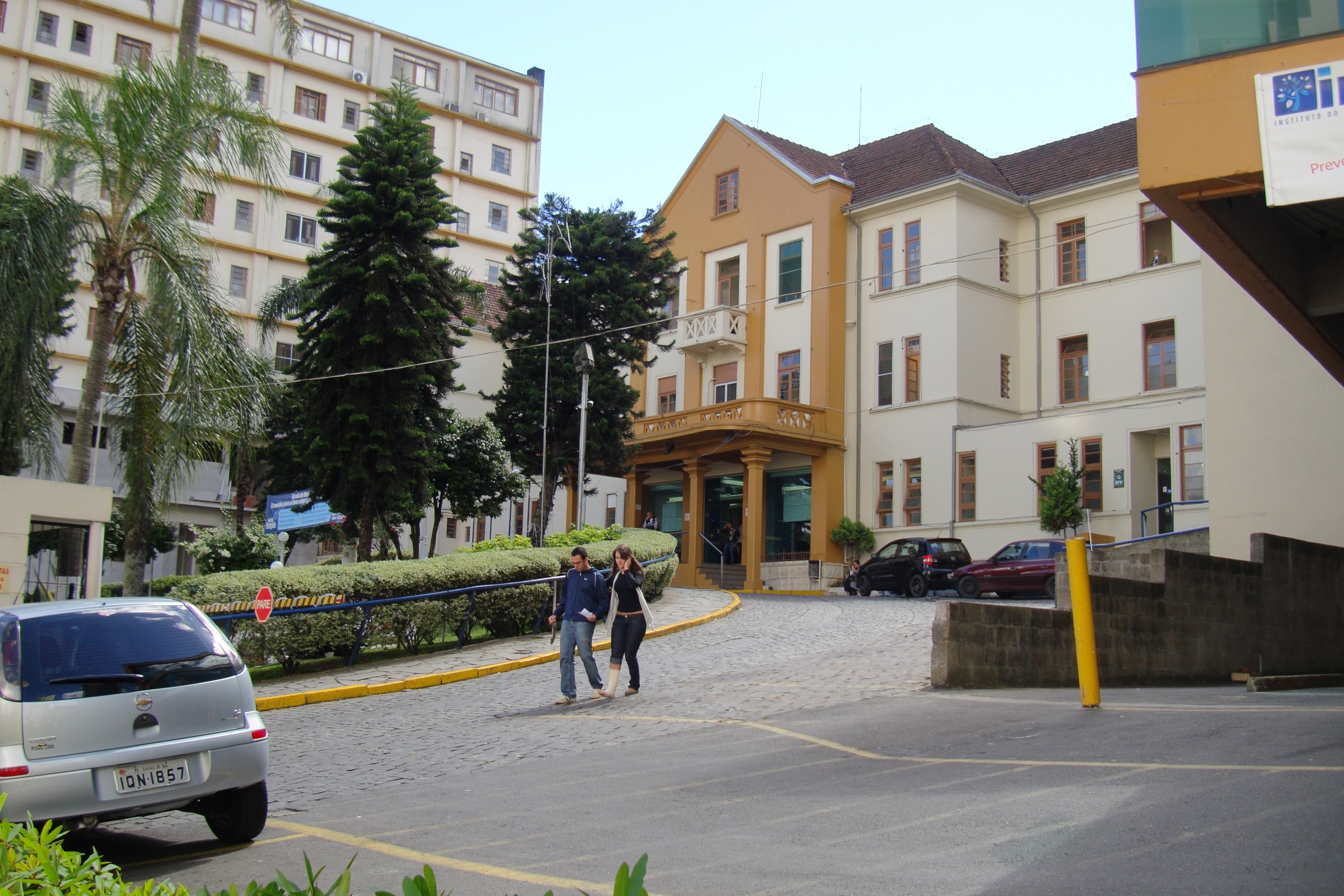
Our Lady of Pompeii Hospital

The municipality also provides health inspection and environmental services; a specialized occupational health service (CEREST/Serra) covering dozens of regional municipalities; several mental health centers; a child monitoring program from conception, Acolhe Bebê; the Mobile Emergency Care Service (SAMU); various specialized services at the Specialized Health Center (CES); and an ombudsman service to receive suggestions, criticisms, and complaints about public health services. Also noteworthy is Círculo Saúde, a philanthropic civil association with a Christian orientation, offering medical and dental care among other activities, and the Associação de Pais e Amigos dos Excepcionais (APAE-Caxias do Sul), which supports individuals with special needs through preventive, enabling, and rehabilitative social assistance, promoting their global development, inclusion, and social integration. APAE-Caxias do Sul currently serves about 500 users with early stimulation, physiotherapy, special education, sheltered workshops, and job placement support, accompanied by psychology, social work, and pedagogy.

=== Public safety ===
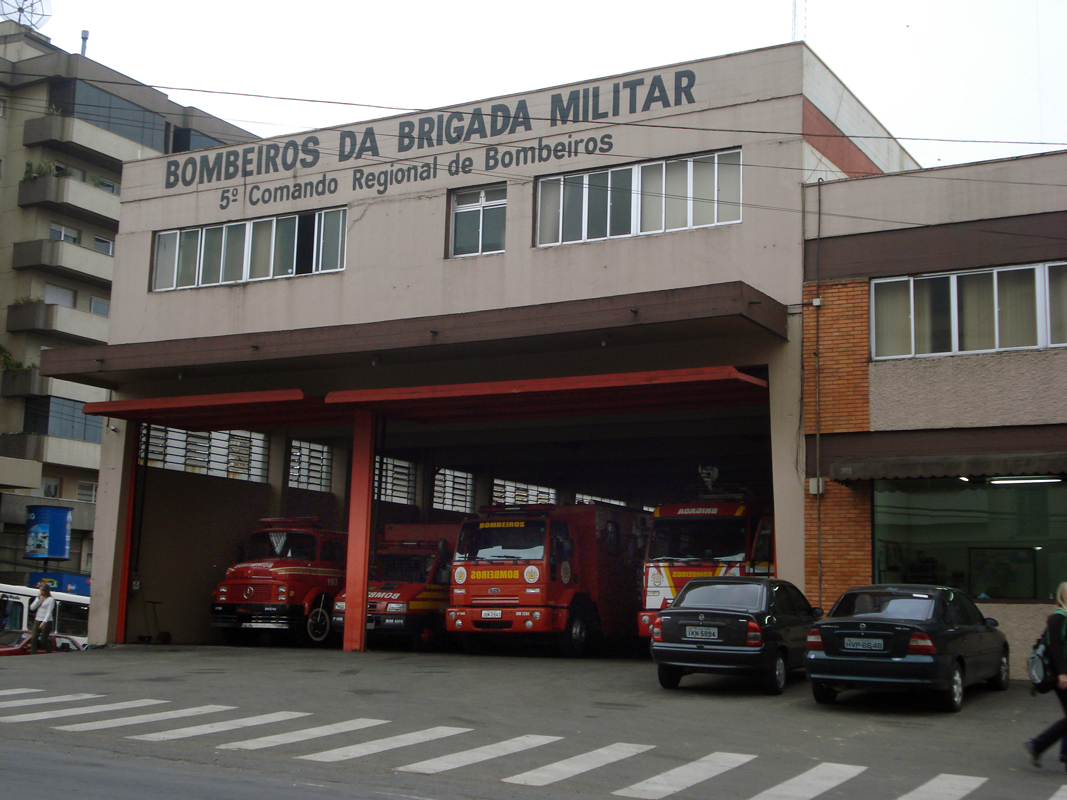
Headquarters of the 5th Regional Fire Department

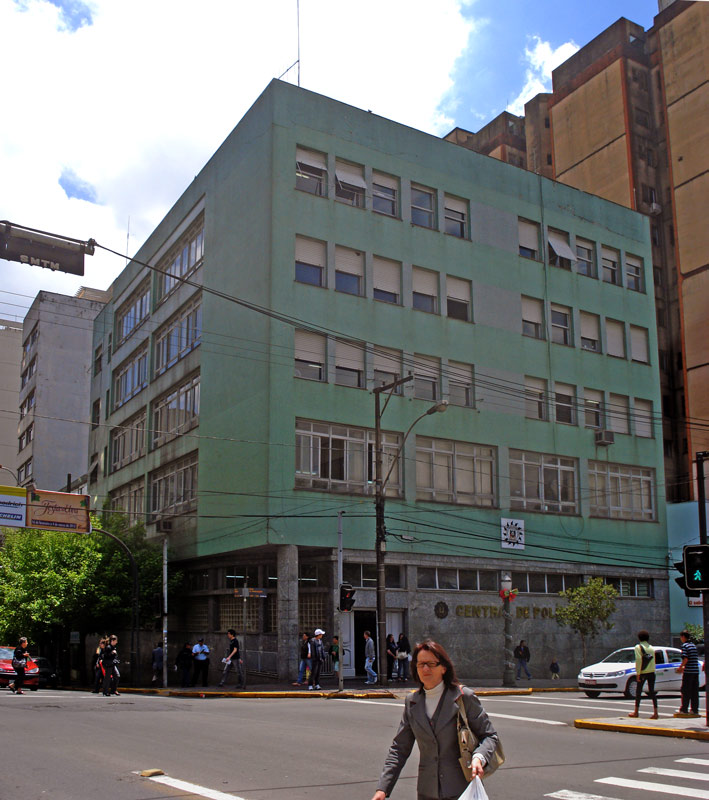
Caxias do Sul Police Station

Public safety in Caxias is provided by various organizations. The municipality maintains a Municipal Guard, which protects municipal assets, services, and facilities and collaborates with municipal oversight bodies. The Municipal Civil Defense Commission is responsible for preventive, assistance, recovery, and rescue actions in public risk situations. The Women's Coordination develops public policies to protect and combat violence against women, while the Youth Coordination performs similar work for young people, alongside other initiatives. The Military Brigade, a state force, maintains a battalion (12th BPM) in the city, divided into five companies with 445 personnel. Its duties include visible policing and patrolling banks, the environment, prisons, schools, and events, as well as social integration programs such as the Social Educational Program for Adolescent Professionalization, Equine-assisted therapy for children and adolescents with psychomotor issues, PROERD for drug prevention among students, and the Child and Adolescent Care Network, in partnership with governmental and non-governmental entities, councils, and the judiciary, addressing various areas of child and adolescent care. Since 2019, the city has hosted the 4th Riot Police Battalion (4th BPChq), a specialized reserve unit under the direct command of the Military Brigade's Deputy Commander-General, supporting units with exhausted operational capacity. Headquartered in Caxias do Sul, the 5th Regional Fire Department conducts fire prevention and suppression activities, as well as search and rescue operations and civil defense initiatives. The Civil Police in Caxias do Sul are responsible for addressing a variety of criminal issues, including illegal gambling, drugs, robbery, theft, and crimes against life. They also develop initiatives to protect children and adolescents, as well as environmental awareness programs.

State and municipal authorities have implemented various measures to improve safety, such as installing surveillance cameras in public spaces, providing resources and equipment to security agencies, and expanding personnel. However, challenges persist. The Caxias do Sul Penitentiary, regarded as a model facility when it opened in 2008, has been confronted with allegations of inmate abuse and has experienced riots. Crime rates are rising for various offenses, such as robbery-homicide, kidnapping, and theft from businesses and pedestrians, though seven other crime types are declining. Bus robberies dropped nearly 170% in 2009 compared to the previous year, and homicides fell by 17.3% in the first half of 2010. However, a homicide occurs approximately every three days in Caxias do Sul, though about 80% of cases are solved. According to Paulo Rosa da Silva, head of the Regional Police Station, most crimes against life occur within circles already linked to illegal activities. According to the State Public Safety Secretariat, in the first six months of 2010, 721 vehicle thefts, 248 vehicle robberies, 129 weapons and ammunition-related offenses, and 112 drug trafficking incidents were recorded.

=== Education ===
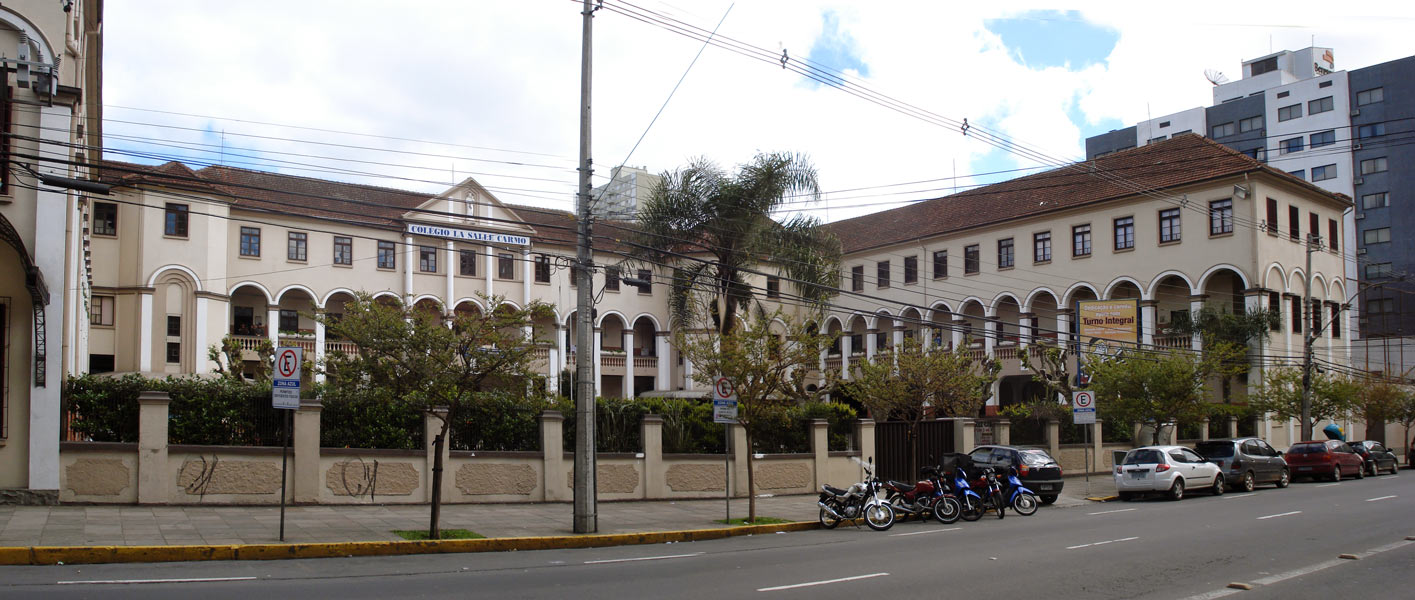
La Salle Carmo School

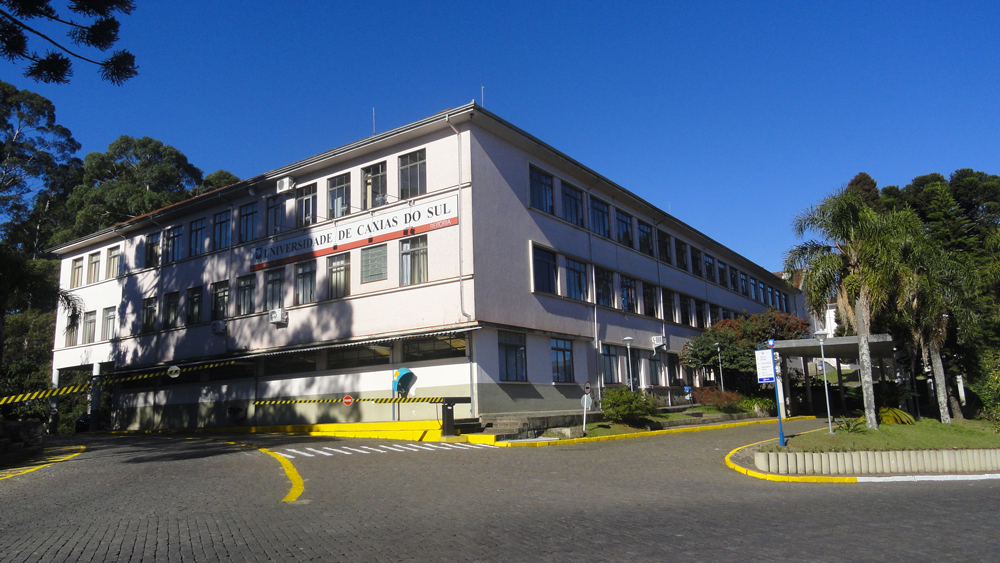
Dean's Office of the University of Caxias do Sul

In terms of education, the municipal school system includes 86 elementary schools and 36 early childhood education centers, with over 2,500 teachers serving special education and adult education, catering to 35,320 students in 2009. The private system had 16,633 enrolled students that year, from preschool to high school and special education, while the state system served an additional 31,494 students in basic and secondary education. In 2000, 98.4% of children aged 7–14 attended school, and 80% of youths aged 15–17. Dropout rates in municipal and state schools between 2003 and 2005 were 6.72% and 11.8%, respectively, with failure rates of 9.01% and 25.0%. The average years of schooling in 2000 was 7.2, and the adult illiteracy rate was 4.2%. Caxias do Sul is home to several prestigious schools with long histories, founded in the early 20th century, such as La Salle Carmo, São José, and La Salle Caxias. Technical education is provided by several SENAI and SENAC units and over 20 other vocational schools.

There are 10 higher education institutions in the city, four offering distance learning courses, and two focused solely on postgraduate education, educating a total of 36,500 students across 185 undergraduate and 189 postgraduate programs. The University of Caxias do Sul (UCS) stands out, offering 58 undergraduate programs, 7 master's degrees, 2 doctorates, and over 70 specialization courses, as well as various extension, distance learning, and technical courses. With 1,100 professors, it serves over 35,000 students, 22,200 at the Caxias campus alone. It has units in eight other cities, covering 69 municipalities, and its 16 libraries house one of Brazil's largest collections, with 950,000 volumes. The city also has two university centers: FSG Centro Universitário da Serra Gaúcha and Centro Universitário e Faculdades. Other higher education institutions include Faculdade Murialdo, Faculdade Fátima, Faculdade La Salle, and units of the Grupo Educacional Anglo-Americano, Rio Grande do Sul State University, Universidade Norte do Paraná, and Unisinos, among others. In June 2024, a Federal University of Rio Grande do Sul (UFRGS) campus was announced for Caxias do Sul.

=== Communications ===
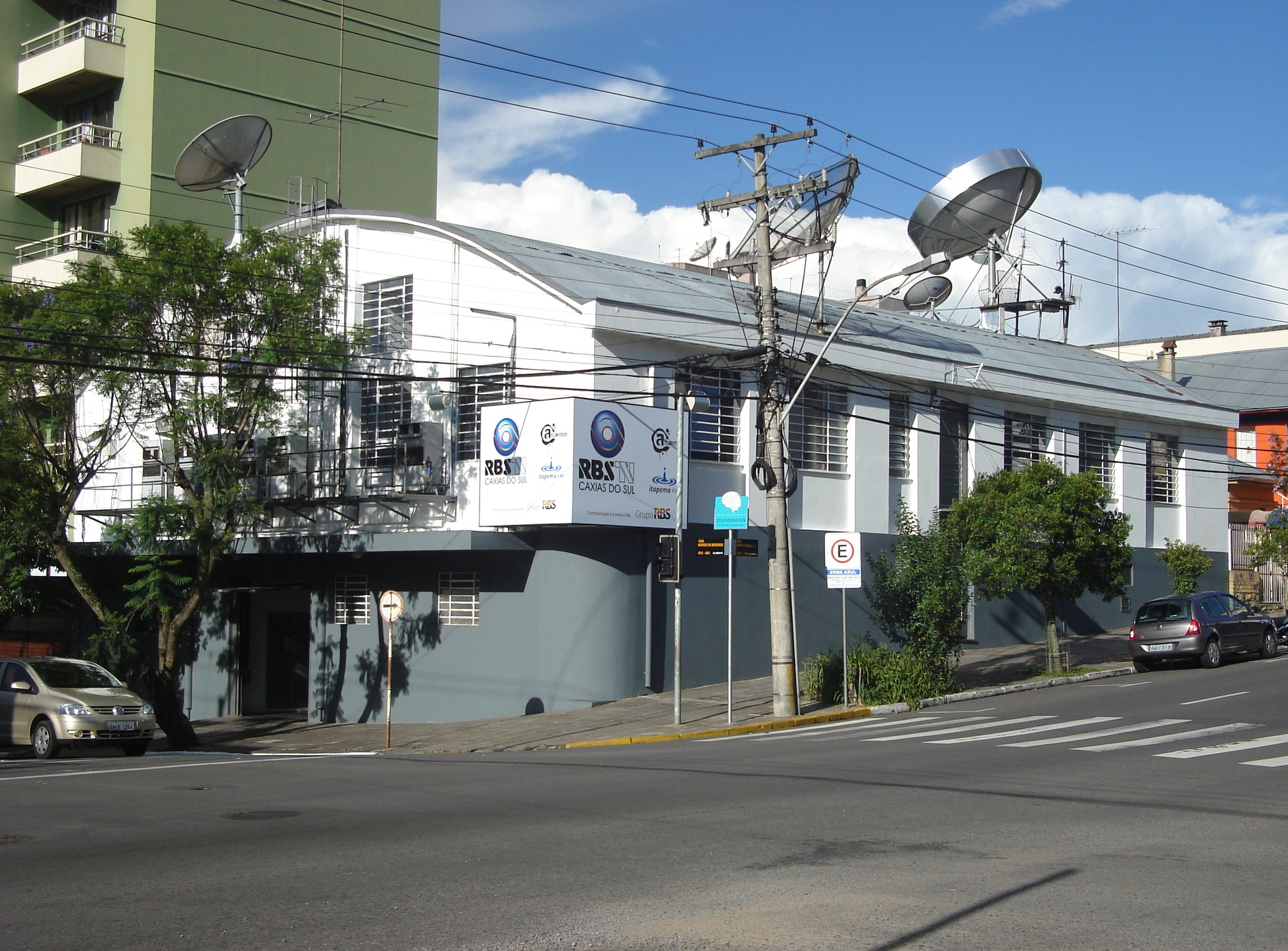
Facilities of RBS TV Caxias do Sul

The city has a robust communications infrastructure. Local fixed-line telephony is operated by the Rio Grande Telecommunications Company (CRT). In 1999, there were 79,386 devices, 62% of which were residential. This equated to a coverage ratio of one device for every four people. Mobile telephony operates in two frequency bands: Band A (Celular CRT S/A), with approximately 28,000 phones in 1999, and Band B (Telet S/A), with about 3,200 phones, 80% of which were in Caxias do Sul. Telex, data transit, message handling, interstate telephony, and executive television network services are all provided by Embratel. Postal services are provided by three urban agencies, five franchised agencies, six satellite post offices, and three collection points of the Correios.

The city has three television stations: TV Caxias - Channel 14, a community network offering occasional free access and fixed slots for members; RBS TV Caxias do Sul, an affiliate of Rede Brasil Sul de Comunicações (RBS), retransmitting Rede Globo programming and producing local content, particularly in journalism; and UCS TV, operated by the University of Caxias do Sul, which aims to integrate the community and university with educational programming for young adults, covering local and regional issues with an academic focus while preserving local identity.

The city also has several radio stations, both AM and FM, including Rádio Caxias, Rádio Tua Voz, Rádio Difusora Caxiense, UCS FM, Sorriso FM, and Rádio São Francisco. There are four newspapers: Pioneiro, published by RBS, Correio Riograndense, O Caxiense, and Gazeta de Caxias. Major newspapers from the state capital, such as Zero Hora, Correio do Povo, and Jornal do Comércio, maintain operations in Caxias to strengthen ties with the state. The city's printing industry is among the most modern in Brazil, with updated infrastructure and dynamic operations.

=== Transportation ===
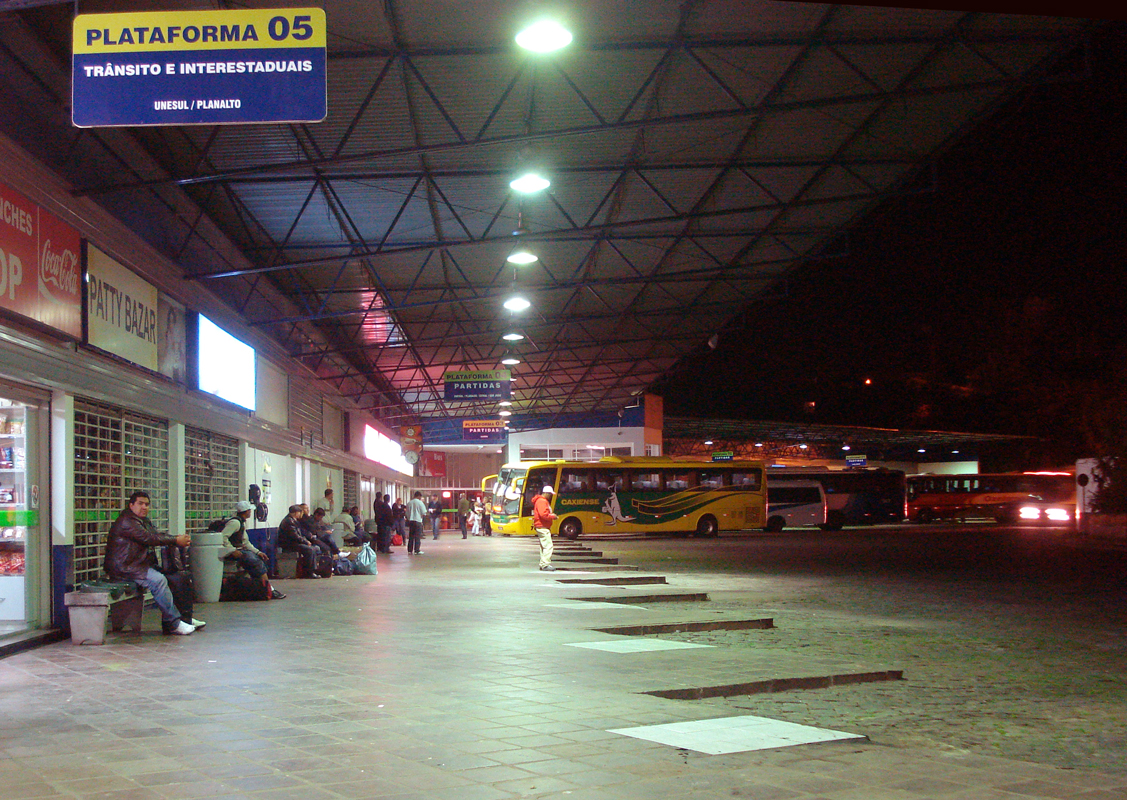
Bus station in Caxias do Sul

The main road accesses to Caxias do Sul are the BR-116, RS-122, and RSC-453 highways. The city has an urban road network of 1,383 km, 882 km of which are paved. As of December 2013, 285,181 vehicles were in circulation, including 190,054 cars, 29,084 motorcycles, and 2,011 buses, averaging 1.97 people per vehicle, making it the second-largest vehicle fleet in the state. Public transportation carries 160,000 passengers daily. Urban bus services are operated by the concessionaire Viação Santa Tereza (VISATE). There are also 307 taxis and 26 shared taxis or minibuses. The bus station, located near the city center, connects Caxias do Sul to nearly all locations in the state and serves the South, Southeast, and Central-West regions of Brazil. The terminal covers 19,000 m^{2}, with 6,800 m^{2} of covered constructed area.

The volume of traffic congestion has been increasing due to the expansion of the private vehicle fleet and the current convergence of the vast majority of urban bus lines toward the city center. Additionally, the number of traffic accidents has risen, particularly among young people, with causes including excessive alcohol consumption, recklessness, negligence, and lack of attention. The Department of Traffic, Transportation, and Mobility, in collaboration with private entities, has been developing projects to improve mobility and promote humane traffic practices, including programs that educate children through playful activities. Air transportation is provided through the Caxias do Sul Airport, which has a 1,939-meter runway capable of accommodating aircraft such as the Boeing 737-800 and Embraer 195E2, with capacities for 186 and 136 passengers, respectively, and up to 200 seats, with an annual capacity of 600,000 passengers. In 2019, the airport handled 208,092 passengers and 486,239 kg of air cargo. It is the second busiest airport in the state of Rio Grande do Sul, serving as the best option for business and tourism flights to Serra Gaúcha. The Caxias do Sul City Hall participates in the airport's management through a Management Agreement, forming part of a Joint Commission responsible for airport administration, security, and human resources management. It is classified as a National Airport in the Rio Grande do Sul State Aviation Plan (PARGS), serving more than 34 municipalities in the state's Serra region. Currently, it connects Caxias do Sul daily to São Paulo via Gol Linhas Aéreas, operating the Boeing 737-800, Azul Brazilian Airlines, operating Embraer 195 and Embraer E2 aircraft to Campinas, and LATAM Airlines, operating Airbus A320 aircraft to Guarulhos.

Caxias do Sul was also once served by rail transport through the Caxias Line of the former Viação Férrea do Rio Grande do Sul, which crosses the entire region and connects it to the city of Montenegro, where it joins the Tronco Principal Sul line. Originally, the railway linked the city to the state capital, Porto Alegre, but some of its original sections were discontinued between the 1960s and 1980s. At the Caxias do Sul Railway Station, passenger trains made their last trips in September 1978, after which the line was restricted to freight transport only. However, in 1985, the former Rede Ferroviária Federal, which managed the railway at the time, reinstated passenger transport to commemorate the city's 75th anniversary, operating on the stretch between Caxias and Farroupilha. The Hungarian Train of the RFFSA operated in the region for the first time, with fully booked trains, marking the last passenger train to travel in the city, albeit for commemorative purposes.

=== Science and technology ===
This area is covered by the activities of various institutions. One of them is the Caxias do Sul Campus of the Federal Institute of Rio Grande do Sul (IFRS), which offers, free of charge, four technical high school courses, one technical course, five undergraduate courses, and two postgraduate courses. The campus is located on land donated by the city government in the northern part of the city, in the Nossa Senhora de Fátima neighborhood.

There are also units of the Faculty of Technology, offering undergraduate, postgraduate, and extension courses in Systems Analysis and Development, Fashion Design, Product Design, Computer Engineering, Information Technology Management, Logistics, Marketing, Multimedia Production, and Computer Networks, among others.

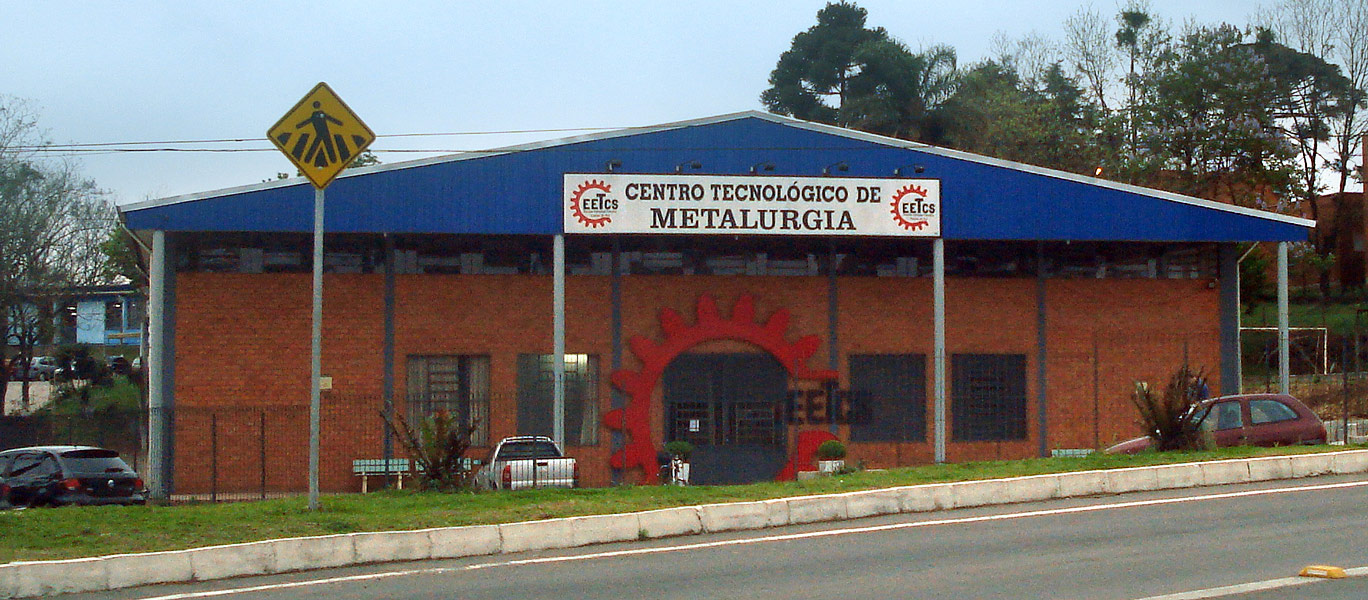
Metallurgy Technology Center of the University of Caxias do Sul

The city government organizes the activities of three technology hubs, including Trino Polo, based at the Technology Incubator, covering the Automotive Metal-Mechanical, Fashion, and Information Technology sectors, integrating numerous producers, traders, and educational institutions. Finally, the University of Caxias do Sul plays a significant role in this area, offering various courses such as Systems Analysis and Development, Human Sciences, Social Sciences, Exact Sciences, Industrial Automation, Fashion Design, Electronics, Polymers, Furniture Production, and many others. It is also home to several research centers, including those focused on Bioinformatics, Biology, Nanotechnology, Biomedical Engineering, Applied Mathematics and Computational Science, Environment, and Natural Resources. The university also has several Innovation and Development Centers, covering areas such as Sustainable Agriculture, Bioenergy, Studies and Research in Public and Social Policies, Regional Studies and Knowledge, Agroindustrial Technology, and Information Technology Applied to Organizations. Several researchers associated with UCS have received awards in their fields.

== Culture ==
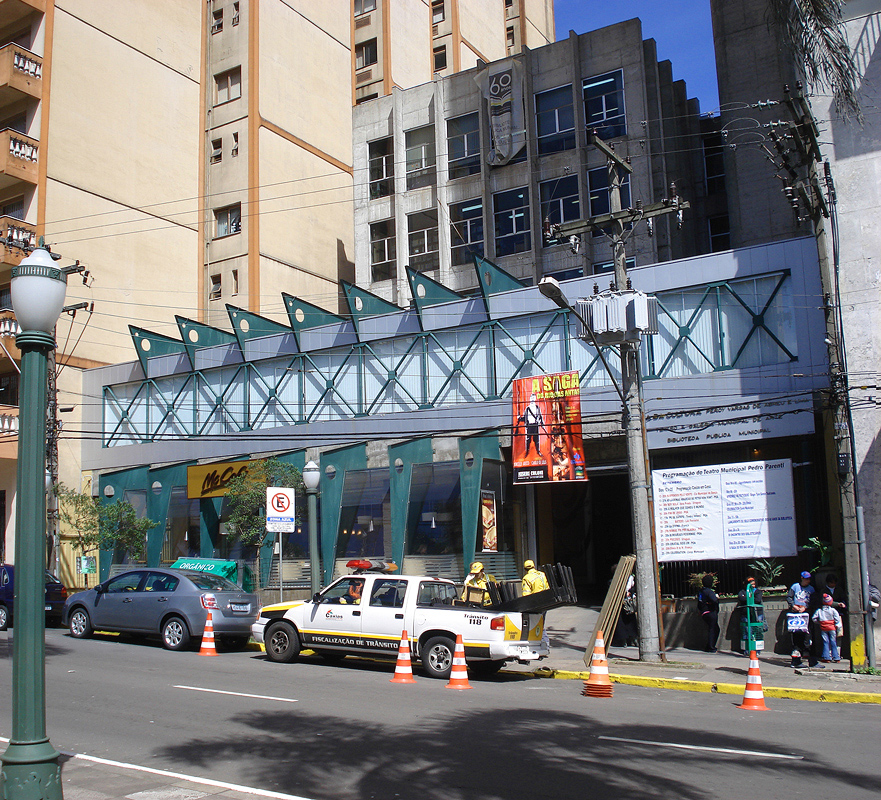
The House of Culture

The colonization of Caxias do Sul took place amid great sacrifices and material deprivation in a still-wild environment. With scarce government assistance, those who did not work hard faced starvation. Despite the effort, many went hungry in the challenging early days. In this adverse context, there was little time for the settlers to dedicate to cultural activities beyond their folkloric aspects, with the most prominent being religious festivals, those related to agricultural production, and domestic entertainment such as lace-making, games, and songs. Despite their diverse origins and distinct cultures, mutual support in times of hardship was crucial, creating a strong network of cooperation that formed the foundation for the rapid flourishing of a prosperous new city, which became the hub for the circulation of surplus production from surrounding family colonies. The settlers were also united by ties of religion, kinship, and ancestry, forming communities with a conservative and traditional profile in a cultural universe that was essentially pragmatic and functional but dominated, as João Carlos Tedesco described, by the "ethos" of the settler, the immigrant—foreigners uprooted from their origins but still poorly integrated into the culture of their new country. The immigrants formed a kind of cultural enclave in the region.

In the urban core, as initial difficulties were overcome and the community rapidly prospered, it became possible to invest in more refined forms of art. Soon, the production of notable painters, religious sculptors, decorators, and photographers flourished. By the early 20th century, the city center was populated with decorated multi-story buildings, mansions, and imposing structures such as the Cathedral, the Episcopal Palace, the Central Cinema Theater, the Clube Juvenil, and various bank headquarters. Elite clubs were formed, operettas were appreciated, and the public became enthusiastic about cinema. Moreover, buoyed by their own prosperity and influenced by the fascism of Mussolini, who publicly praised them, the immigrants and their first generation of descendants developed considerable pride. Under the nationalist policies of the Vargas Era, this ethnic pride and cultural enclave were dissolved through significant government violence and repression. Social reconciliation occurred only in the 1950s, but this forced integration led to the loss of many traditions and valuable community values.

The situation today is quite different. Caxias do Sul has opened up to cosmopolitan culture and cultivates the arts in various forms. The municipal government directly maintains or supports a wide range of departments, programs, groups, and cultural institutions, including the Percy Vargas de Abreu e Lima Cultural Center, which encompasses the Municipal Theater, the Public Library, and the Municipal Art Gallery, the Henrique Ordovás Filho Cultural Center, theater, dance, music, and literature units, and the Department of Popular Art and Culture, while also promoting various community centers. The city government also supports culture through the Culture Incentive Law (Fundoprocultura) and annually awards several prizes and trophies in various cultural fields. In 2006, 650,000 reais were spent by the public sector on culture. In 2008, the city was named the Brazilian Capital of Culture.

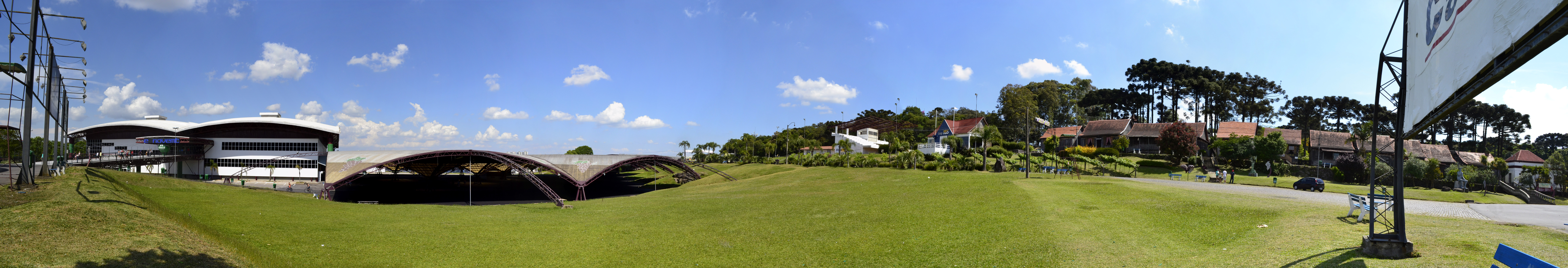
Panoramic photo of the Festa da Uva Pavilions with a replica of old Caxias.

=== Traditions and folklore ===
The decline of religion as a unifying social force, new consumption habits, profound changes in the local production system, the standardization of Brazilian education, the indifference of younger generations toward their grandparents' language and customs, the presence of a significant number of recent migrants of non-Italian descent for whom colonial traditions hold no meaning, the widespread popularity of media and entertainment such as radio, TV, and cinema, and the city's progressive opening to the world caused a rapid erosion of the ethnic and traditional characteristics of Caxias' culture, especially in the urban area, between the 1950s and 1960s. Sensing an imminent loss of roots, starting in the mid-1970s, some local intellectuals began to focus on preserving the ancestral cultural heritage. Among them, Loraine Slomp Giron and João Spadari Adami conducted significant research that resulted in the publication of several essential books for studying local history. However, during this period, which saw a surge in literature on immigration, not only in Caxias do Sul, the history of the settlers was revisited with new, more candid, objective, and scientific interpretations, unlike the interwar generations of writers who glorified the settler. These new studies presented Caxias' history with its contradictions and conflicts, aiming to make the image of the immigrant less mythical but more real and richer.

This same interest in the past led the municipal government to restructure and reopen the Municipal Museum in 1975 and create the Museu Ambiência Casa de Pedra, two of the city's most important historical museums. In 1976, the Municipal Historical Archive was established, and in the following decade, the Department of Historical Heritage was created, initiating efforts to preserve and recover intangible traditions, artistic legacy, and Italian architectural heritage, which were rapidly disappearing. The work of these institutions, grounded in the belief that progress can coexist with the past, along with the efforts of artistic groups such as Miseri Coloni, a theater group performing in the region's characteristic dialect, Talian, are active forces in preserving and revitalizing important aspects of Italian tradition, reinserting them with a critical perspective into the life of an increasingly cosmopolitan city.

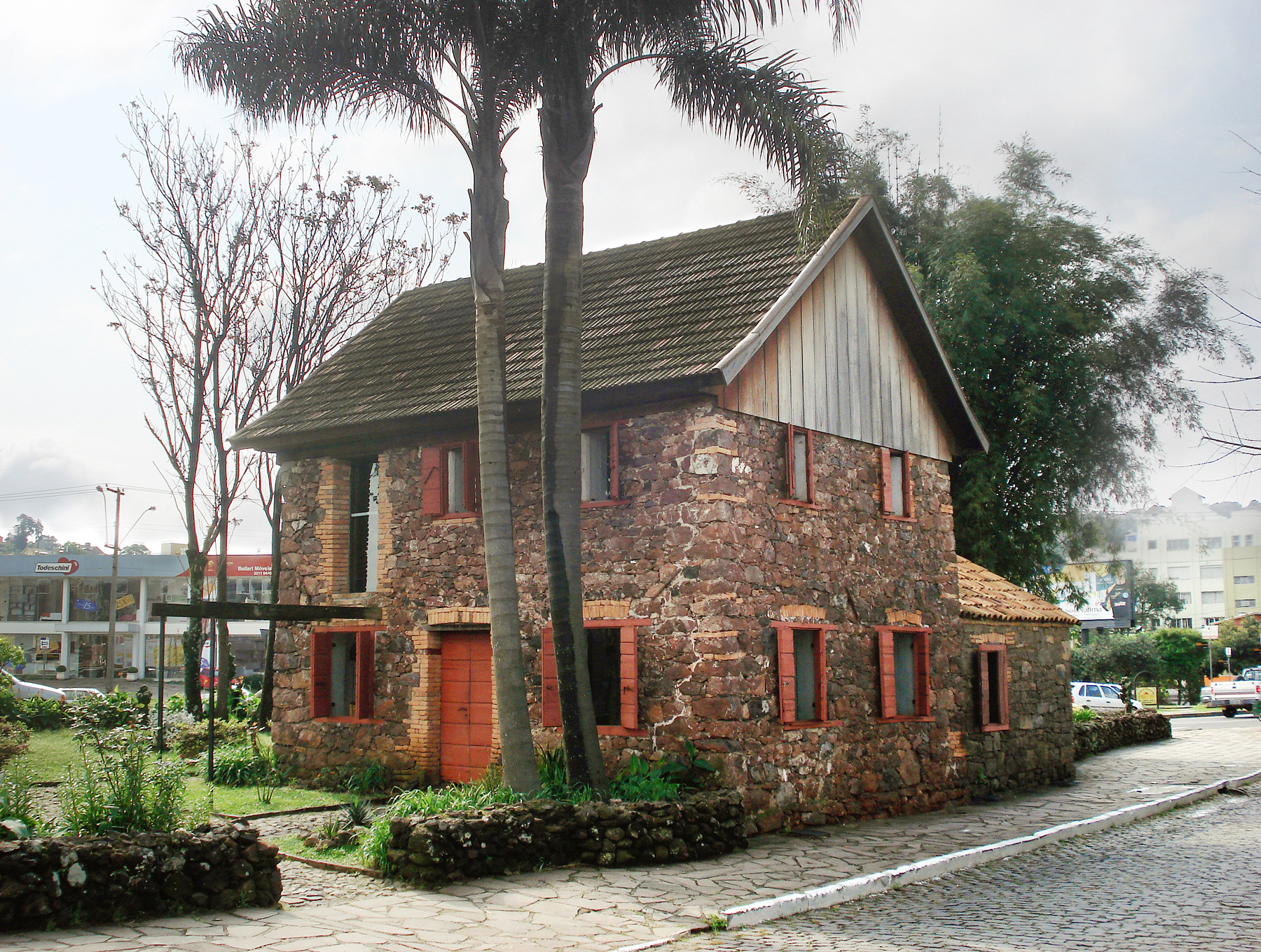
The Museu Ambiência Casa de Pedra

In the rural areas, traditions dating back to the early days of colonization are still found spontaneously. Among them is the filó, a gathering of families who socialize in home kitchens or wine cellars. Men talk and play cards, bocce, or mora, women engage in manual crafts such as crochet, sewing, and making dressa, a braid of corn straw used to create hats, while sharing their experiences, and children play with toys. These gatherings are always accompanied by a glass of wine, salami, grostoli (a type of sweet dumplings), bread, and cheese. The group eventually starts singing, collectively singing old tunes that evoke the Italian homeland, ancestors, love, and work. During Christmas, large groups travel through rural communities, visiting friends. Along the way, carrying a torch adorned with a paper star, they sing canções da stela, announcing the new star symbolizing the birth of Jesus. On the feast day of the patron saint of community chapels, the sagra takes place, another ritual celebration marked by collective music and communal feasts. The same occurs at weddings, New Year's celebrations, and other significant dates in rural culture, such as the grape harvest. Some of these colonial traditions persist even in the urban center, particularly in cuisine and in some religious festivals, such as the "processions of the encounter" and the "kiss of the Dead Lord" during Holy Week, which still attract thousands of devotees.

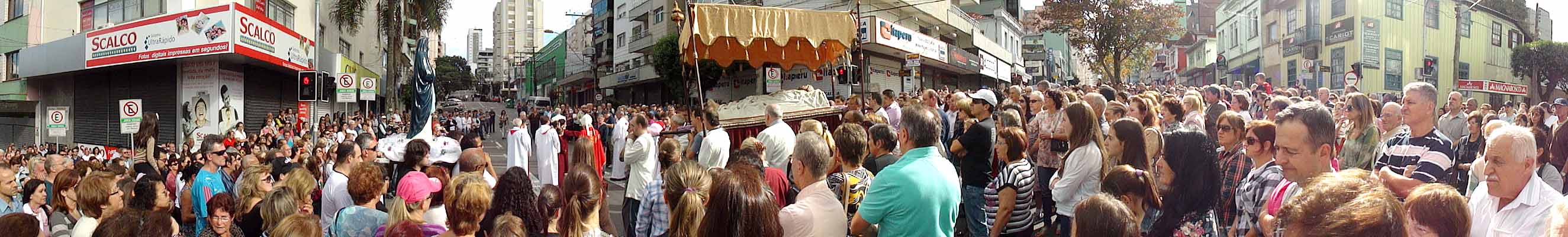
Procession of the Encounter: Our Lady of Sorrows, leaving the Chapel of the Holy Sepulchre, meets the Dead Lord coming from the Cathedral. Both then return to the Cathedral for an open-air Mass at Dante Alighieri Square.

The figure of Nanetto Pipetta also remains alive, a literary character created in 1924 by Friar Aquiles Bernardi as an embodiment of the utopias cherished by immigrants in contrast to the harsh reality they faced in their colonizing endeavor. His adventures were published in the Talian dialect, originally as a feuilleton, in the newspaper Staffetta Riograndense and achieved immediate success. The stories were compiled into books several times, consistently selling out, with over 150,000 copies sold, including internationally. A continuation was published starting in 1990, written by various authors, also in Talian, and published by the same newspaper, now called Correio Riograndense. A humorous parody of the settler's image was created by cartoonist Carlos Henrique Iotti, Radicci, published in various newspapers and awarded the HQ Mix Trophy, Brazil's most prestigious award for comics.

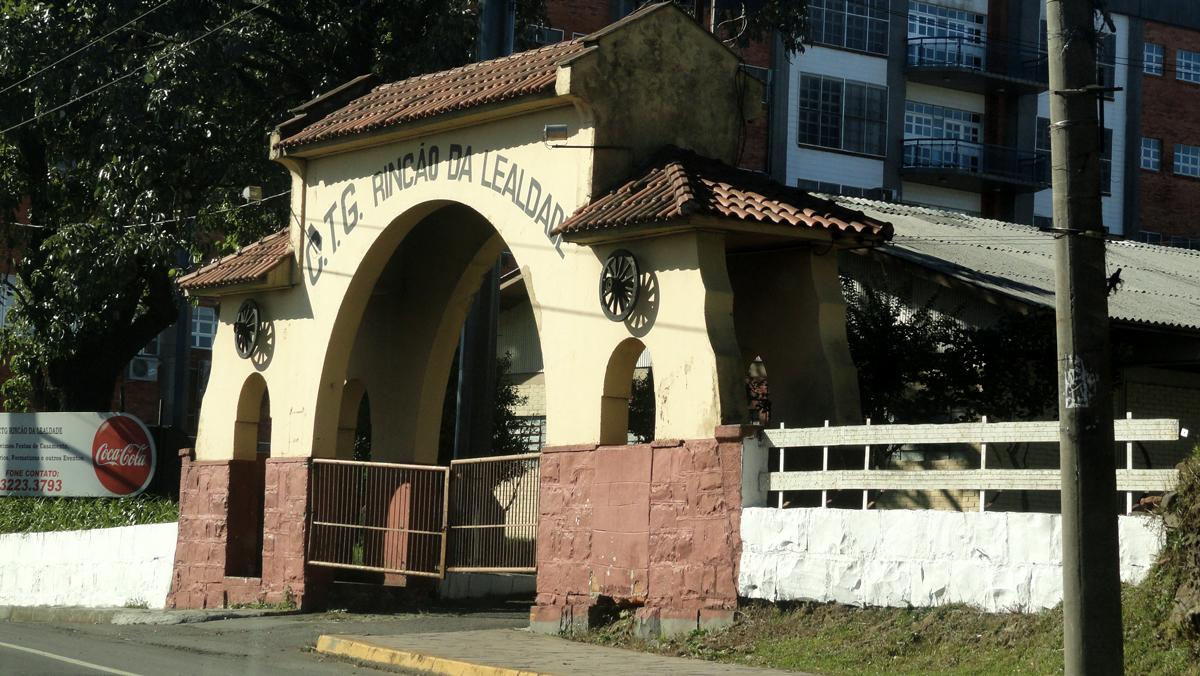
Entrance to the Center for Gaucho Traditions Rincão da Lealdade, the oldest in the city

The folkloric memory and official history constructed in Caxias do Sul are still rooted in the celebration of work and the virtues of Italian immigrants, sometimes overlooking or minimizing contributions from other groups. This is also evident in the historical sections provided on the municipal government's website. Although Italians were the predominant initial group, making up 90% of the population in 1898, they were not the only ones who built the city, as other ethnic groups also contributed, nor were they the first inhabitants of the land, which had been populated by indigenous peoples for millennia. On the other hand, the massive penetration of Brazilian and international culture through various media, combined with the contemporary growth of other traditions, has made the local culture increasingly diverse, making it harder to define boundaries and contain ethnic and cultural intermingling. For example, the popularization of gaucho traditionalism, which holds an annual National Creole Rodeo attracting 150,000 people, and the existence of over 20 Centers of Gaucho Traditions in the city, with the Rincão da Lealdade being the oldest, while only one Italian society remains active. Even amidst the cosmopolitanization the city has experienced in recent decades, the strength of Italian tradition remains significant. An example of this is the community of Criúva's rejection of a proposed indigenous-themed park in the region, with public authorities yielding to the protests.

Urban folklore stories also persist, such as that of "Martha Rocha de Caxias," a woman who identified with the Miss Brazil Martha Rocha and wore a swimsuit and sash in public squares; the tale of Garibaldi, a swindler who offered to sell public works such as viaducts; stories about the traditional rivalry with the neighboring city of Bento Gonçalves, the subject of many popular jokes; and various tales involving Father Giordani, a prominent community leader known for his strict morals and controversial actions.

==== Festa da Uva ====
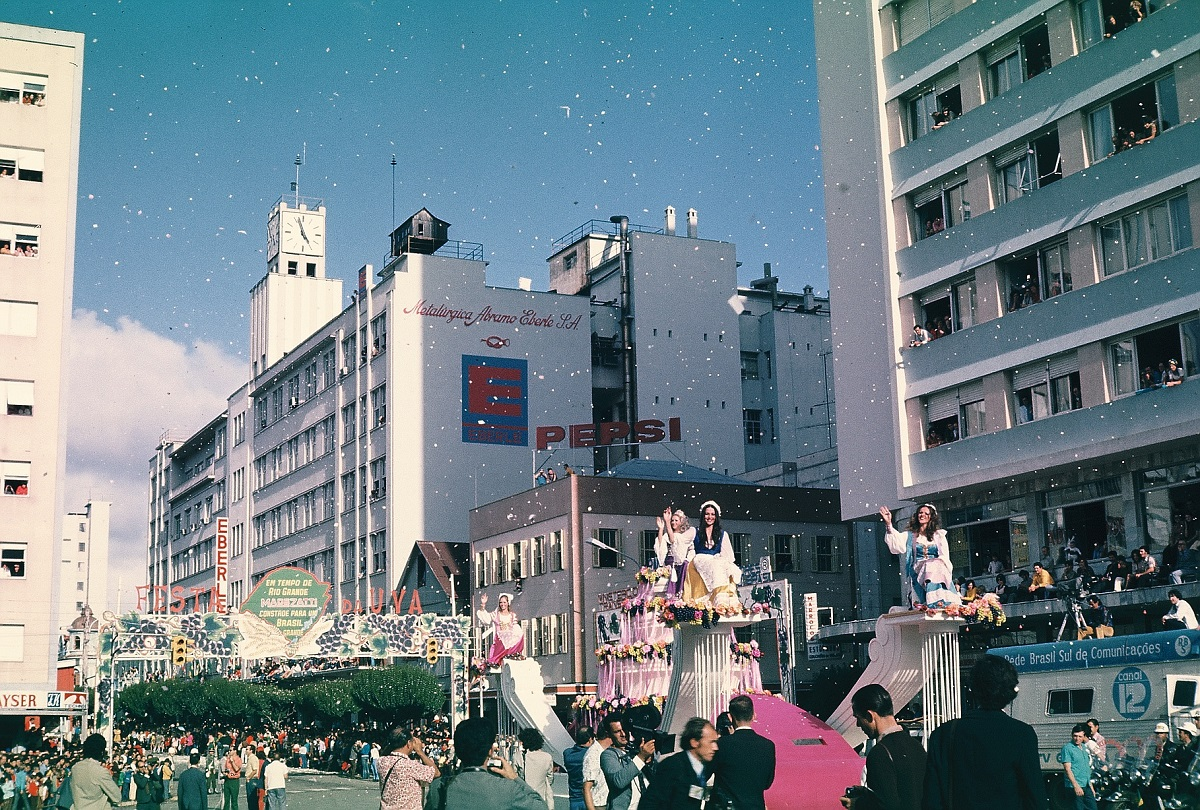
First live color television broadcast in Brazil at the Festa da Uva in 1972.

The Festa da Uva is the main festival of Caxias do Sul, dedicated to celebrating Italian colonization and reviving the community's historical traditions. Held every two years since 1931, it enlivens the entire city with a variety of events over its fifteen-day duration. At the Exhibition Park, hundreds of stalls showcase the region's typical agricultural products, highlighting grapes, while other sections display local activity in cuisine, industry, and commerce. The festival includes music shows, theater, dances, free grape distribution, thematic, artistic, and historical exhibitions, and traditional colonial games such as cheese-throwing, grape-crushing with feet, and tractor races. Wineries and cellars open to tourists, but the most iconic event is the parade of allegorical floats, which illustrate various aspects of the theme chosen for each edition. The parade features the queen and princesses of the Festa, considered true ambassadors of the city, promoting it elsewhere. Although Italian immigrants are the protagonists of the Festa, other ethnic groups that contributed to the city's development are also represented and honored.

=== Arts ===
The city has a municipal gallery at the House of Culture for temporary exhibitions and a public art collection, the Municipal Fine Arts Collection, housed at the Dr. Henrique Ordovás Filho Cultural Center, which conducts a regular program of exhibitions and educational projects. In addition to the city government's efforts, the field of visual arts is particularly driven by two private entities, the most important being the Caxias do Sul Visual Arts Nucleus (NAVI), which brings together many artists and systematically offers practical and theoretical courses. This is followed by the University of Caxias do Sul, which maintains a regular arts degree program, an exhibition gallery, and a variety of community-oriented extension activities. Associated with UCS is the most prominent name in Caxias' visual arts today, Diana Domingues, who coordinates a research group linked to the university for advanced studies in art associated with technology, ARTECNO, which brings together researchers with master's and doctoral degrees, has held numerous exhibitions, and published a large number of books and articles on the subject. Diana also has a significant role as an independent artist and thinker, considered by Oliver Grau one of the most notable artists in South America, serving on editorial boards and avant-garde art committees of international repute.

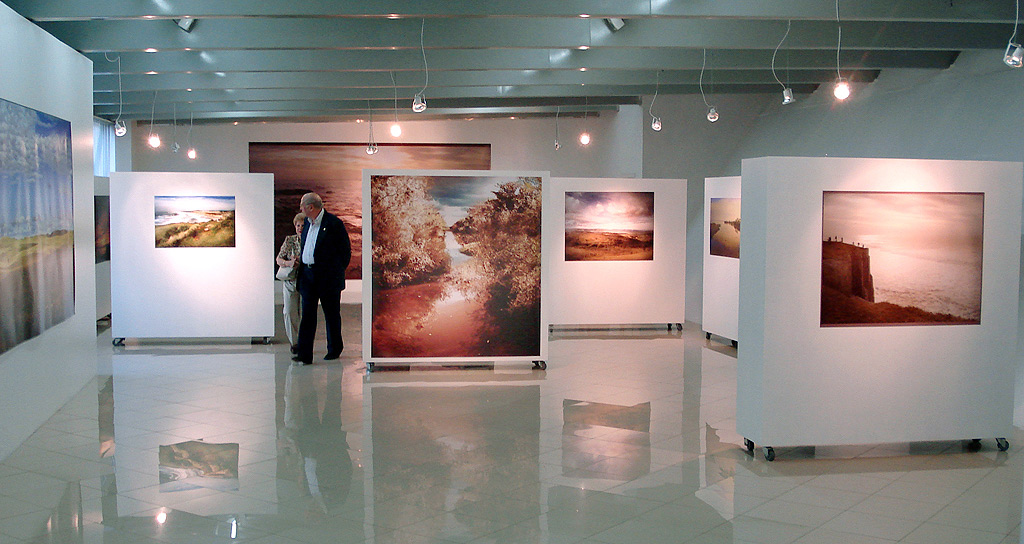
Photographic exhibition at the House of Culture

Photography has been consolidating its presence in the city, although notable photographers such as Júlio Calegari and Ulysses Geremia left their mark since the early 20th century. The active Caxias do Sul Photographers' Club celebrated its 30th anniversary in 2010, the year it organized the XXVI edition of the Brazilian Black and White Photographic Art Biennial, with a record number of entries. Photography is the subject of a higher education course offered by UCS, there are numerous active professional studios, and exhibitions in this medium are frequent.

In terms of classical music, the two most important ensembles are the Caxias do Sul Municipal Wind Orchestra, maintained by the city government, which performs both classical and popular repertoires and offers a series of Didactic Concerts addressing the History of Music, featuring commented performances of works by renowned composers from the past, and the Caxias do Sul University Symphony Orchestra, which has performed for over 90,000 people. In terms of popular music, various bands enliven the scene with styles for all tastes, notably Apocalypse, formed in 1983, Noisekiller, a thrash metal band, and The Trippers, a rock band reinterpreting the aesthetics of the 1960s, which was a finalist in the Pepsi Music 2010 festival and whose song As Coisas São como São won the SESI Discovering Talents 2009 award. The Descarrilhado Rock Festival, an independent event, provides a platform for original music and attracts bands from across the state and beyond, the city government celebrates World Rock Day with the Rock On festival, showcasing various rock genres such as rockabilly, hardcore, indie, punk, surf, electronic, and innovative works, and supports the Gravaêh Project, promoted by the NGO Cirandar, dedicated to recording local music production across various genres. The city has several samba schools, and there are spaces for MPB with local performers, supported by official projects such as Ordovás Acústico and Série Grandes Nomes at the Henrique Ordovás Filho Cultural Center. Additionally, there is a considerable audience for gaucho music, and several notable Brazilian music artists have performed in the city, such as Armandinho, Jota Quest, Sérgio Reis, and Apocalypse.

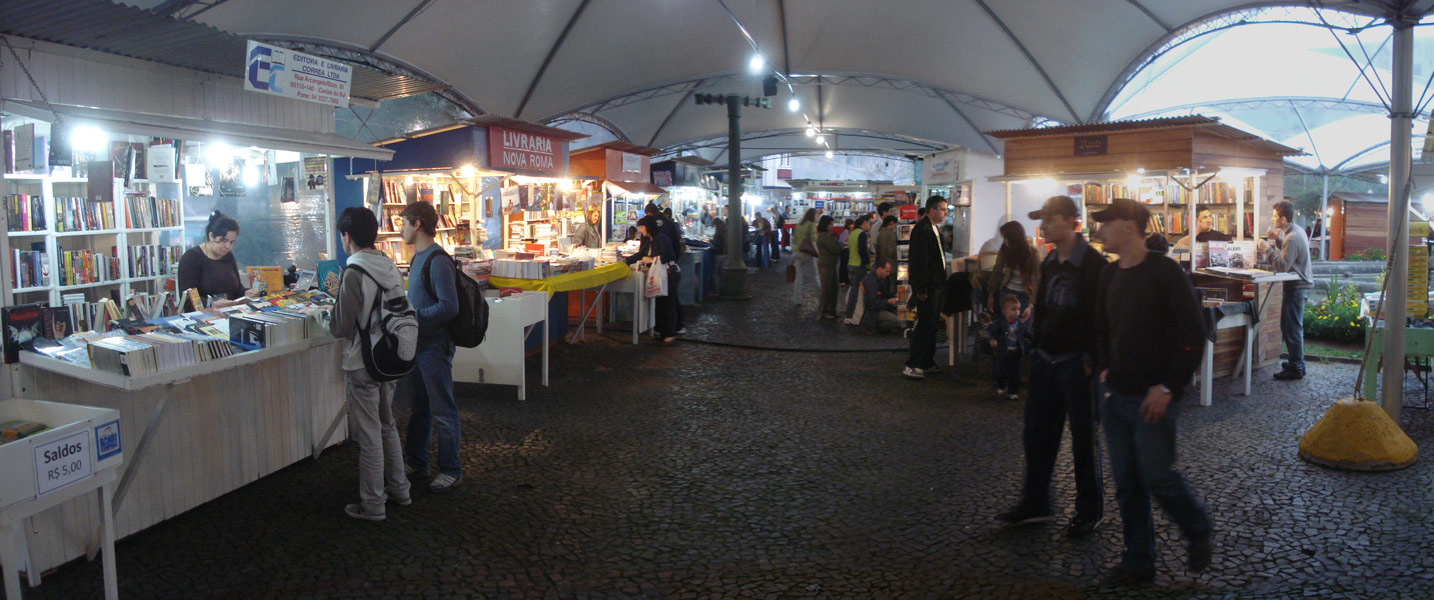
2010 Book Fair

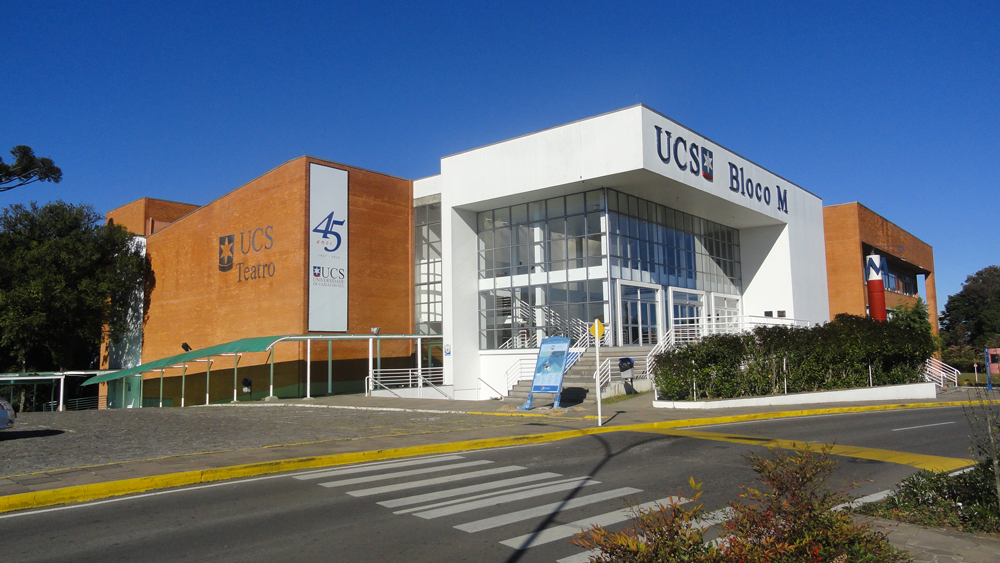
UCS Theater

Literature in Caxias do Sul has been gaining recognition, boasting an Academy of Letters and several authors, either born or active in the city, who have achieved national prominence. These include Fabrício Carpi Nejar, a poet who has published over 15 books and received several prestigious awards, such as the Olavo Bilac National Prize from the Brazilian Academy of Letters; José Clemente Pozenato, author of O Quatrilho, a work adapted into a film directed by Bruno Barreto and nominated for the Oscar for Best Foreign Language Film; and Jayme Paviani, a poet and philosopher with numerous published titles and extensive teaching activity at the UCS. The city hosts a vibrant Book Fair, now in its 26th edition, which grows annually and features hundreds of parallel cultural attractions, such as author meet-and-greets, thematic roundtables, autograph sessions, music, storytelling, workshops, lectures, and theater performances. In 2009, the fair sold 71,200 books and attracted approximately 300,000 visitors.

There are several venues for theatrical performances throughout the city, including school auditoriums and private cultural centers. The city also has well-equipped theaters, including one at the House of Culture, though modest in size with 286 seats, named the Pedro Parenti Municipal Theater, and another at the University of Caxias do Sul, with 750 seats. Both venues provide space for local and national theater groups, including performances by renowned actors such as Paulo Autran, Fernanda Montenegro, Cristiana Oliveira, José Wilker, Patrícia Pillar, and Edson Celulari. Another theater, the Moinho da Estação Theater, with 250 seats, was recently inaugurated in the historic Aristides Germani mill building, located opposite the former Railway Station, now transformed into a cultural center. The municipal government, through its Theater Unit, organizes or supports various local groups and events, such as the Student Theater Festival, which in 2009 featured 34 plays produced by students for an audience of 5,600 spectators, the Caxias em Cena, an event with international reach, and the Women's Theater Festival. The Miseri Coloni group is also notable, having developed theatrical works in the Talian dialect since 1987. Their productions recreate situations experienced by early settlers with a critical approach that recovers ancestral memory while connecting to modern life. Additionally, the group performs free adaptations, also in Talian, of texts by classic authors such as Goldoni.

Dance has also received significant attention, with the municipal government playing a key role by promoting various programs in this artistic genre, bringing in international names, fostering local production, and maintaining a stable dance company. Other active groups include the traditional Dora Ballet school, with 50 years of activity and several awards, the Ney Moraes Dance Group, the Ballet Margô Brusa, awarded at prestigious events such as the Joinville Dance Festival, and the Serra Gaúcha College Dance Nucleus, which received the Desterro Prize at the Florianópolis Dance Festival.

==== Handicrafts ====
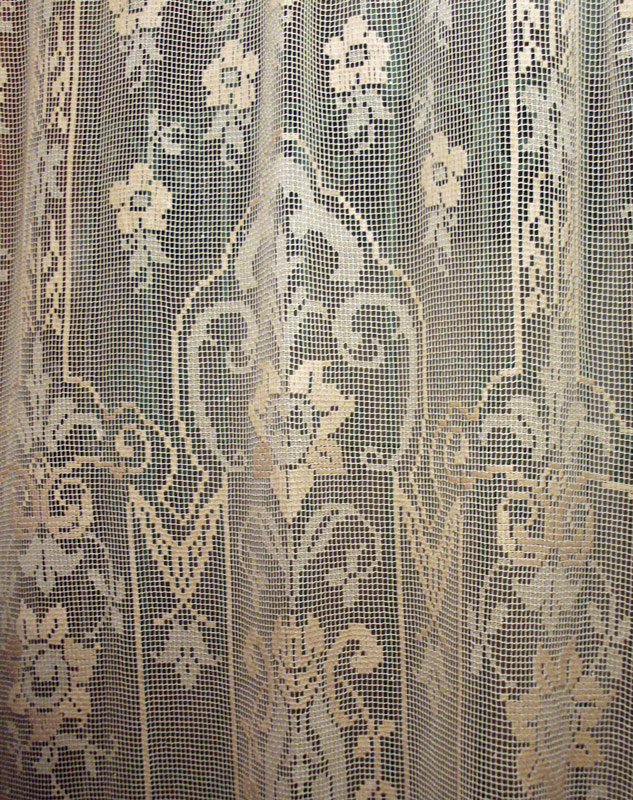
Detail of a "filé" lace curtain, a tradition of local handicrafts

Handicrafts in Caxias do Sul hold a significant position due to their considerable economic, artistic, touristic, and social impact. Over 2,000 artisans are registered with the municipal government, many of whom are organized into associations. Mayor José Ivo Sartori, when opening the main events dedicated to the sector, the International Culture and Handicraft Fair "Mãos da Terra" and the Caxias Artisan Exhibition, held concurrently, emphasized the importance of integration among artisans, stating that "hands are the symbol of work, construction, and friendship. Handicrafts are not just a product but a way of experiencing a people's beliefs and culture. Make this fair an opportunity for good sales, exchange of experiences, and strengthening this activity as a source of income."

The 2009 edition of these events brought handicrafts from 20 countries and 11 Brazilian states to the city, alongside 81 local exhibitors, attracting over 70,000 visitors. Thus, the city's artisans not only work with themes and techniques inherited from immigrants, such as basketry, crochet, and knitting, but are also in a phase of expanding their horizons, leveraging such events to internationalize their craft, which now encompasses hundreds of productive modalities, including items made from recycled waste.

=== Architecture and historical heritage ===
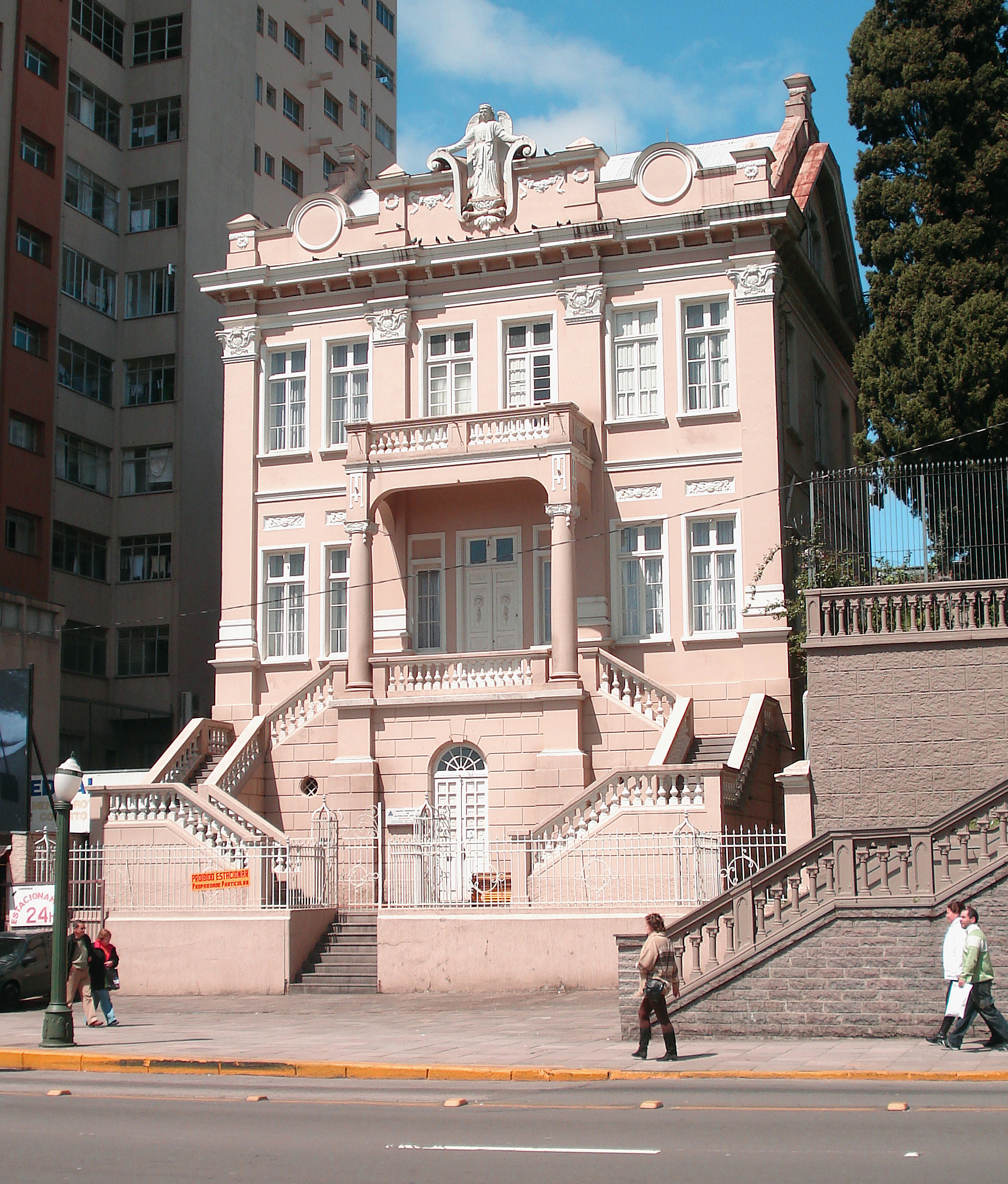
Canonical House, one of the city's historic buildings

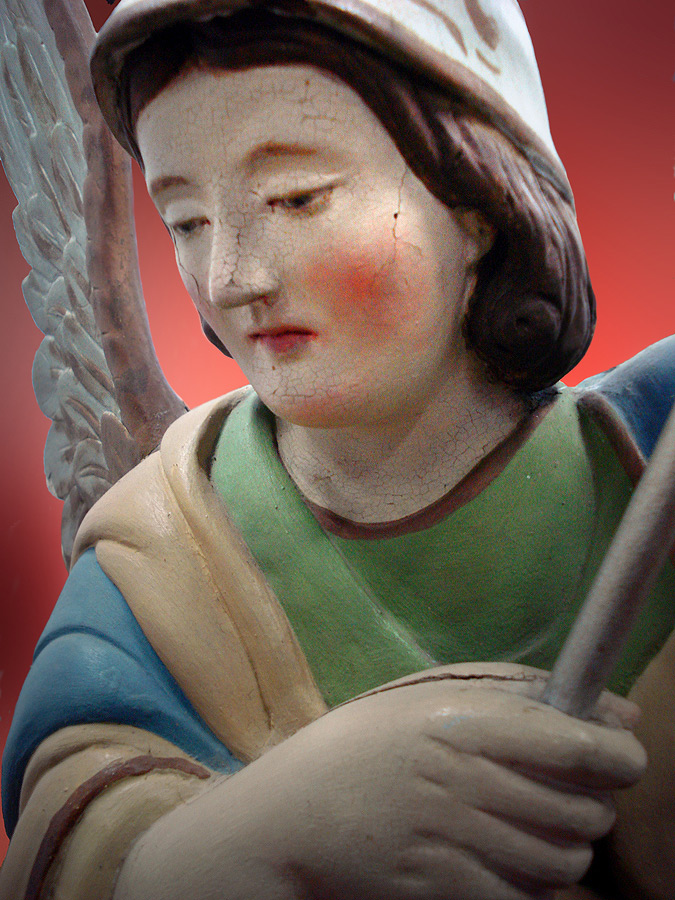
Pietro Stangherlin: detail of Saint Michael Defeating the Demon, late 19th to early 20th century, Municipal Museum collection

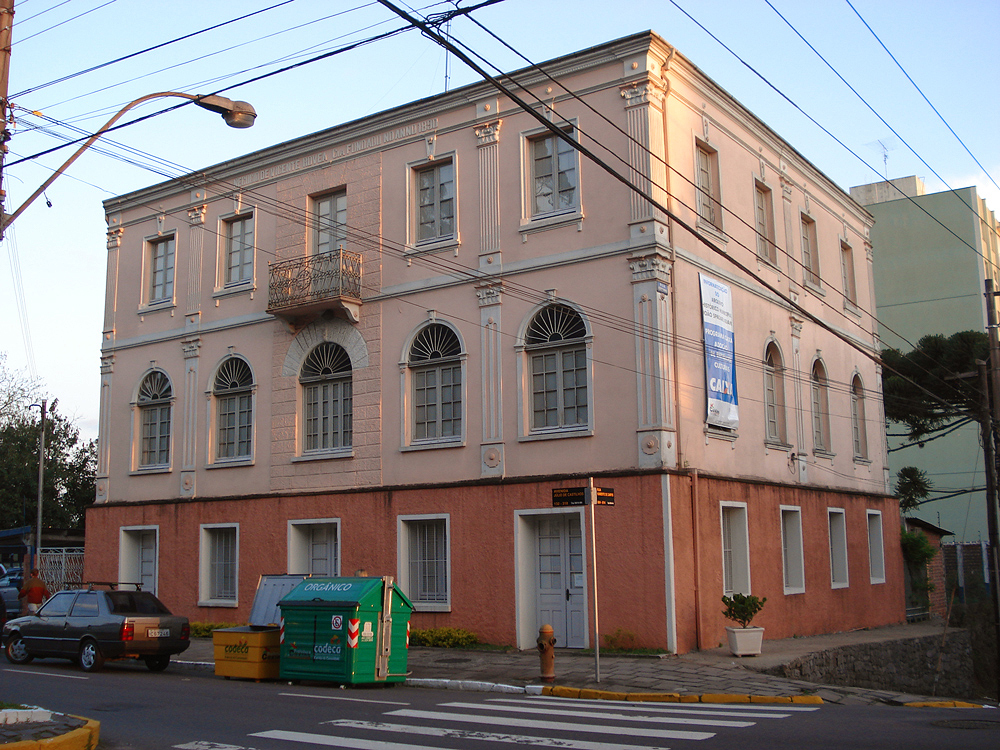
Municipal Historical Archive

Official interest in preserving the historical and architectural heritage of the city is relatively recent, beginning only in the mid-1970s and progressing slowly until the last decade. As a result, few buildings survived the urban modernization from the mid-20th century onward, with significant and sometimes irreplaceable losses, such as the Cine Teatro Ópera, a unique example of its kind, destroyed by a fire suspected to be arson and replaced by a parking lot. Another example is the Casa de Pedra, a typical 19th-century colonial construction and the only building of its kind, once common, that survived in the urban area. Although converted into a museum since 1975, it was only listed as a heritage site in 2003.

However, in recent years, the municipal government, in partnership with other institutions, has begun identifying, listing, and restoring various buildings of historical and architectural value, both in urban and rural areas, and has also started protecting intangible historical heritage. Among the listed buildings in the eclectic style, built between the late 19th and early 20th centuries, are the Saldanha Bookstore, the Carbone Hospital, the Eberle Palace, the Scotti House, the Agricultural Patronage House, and the Sassi House. The Chapel of the Holy Sepulchre is an interesting neo-Gothic structure, and the historic buildings of the Abramo Eberle Metalworks are fine representatives of modernist industrial construction. Although not listed, the Caxias do Sul Cathedral is of great interest and importance. Built starting in 1895 in the neo-Gothic style, it features a series of German stained glass windows, side altars with statuary by local artists such as Pietro Stangherlin and Michelangelo Zambelli, and a richly carved large high altar, the work of Francisco Meneguzzo. The cathedral forms a complex with the Canonical House, an eclectic-style palace serving as the bishop's residence. In addition to heritage listing protection, according to the 1999 Municipal Organic Law, no building or work over 50 years old—whether public or private buildings, churches, chapels, monuments, statues, squares, or cemeteries—can be demolished without prior authorization from the Municipal Historical and Cultural Heritage Council.

Other institutions linked to the Department of Memory and Cultural Heritage of the Culture Secretariat are dedicated to recovering, studying, systematizing, preserving, and disseminating relics of the past in various forms. Among them, the following stand out:

- The Municipal Museum of Caxias do Sul, focused on preserving material records of the immigration and civilizing process in the region. Housed in the former Otolini residence, it holds a large collection of tools used by early farmers, items related to various urban trades, a section of sacred art, and a wide variety of other pieces. The museum is well-structured and offers a range of community-oriented activities.
- The João Spadari Adami Municipal Historical Archive, established in 1976 and currently housed in the former Carbone Hospital building. It studies and preserves a variety of written and visual documentation from public and private sources.
- The Zambelli Atelier Memorial, which preserves and displays the remnants of the sculpture studio of the important family of sacred image makers and decorators, who worked not only in the municipality but throughout the Italian colonization region.
- The Primo Slomp Grape and Wine Museum. Focusing on one of the municipality's most characteristic productive activities, the museum was established in 2002 in the historic Forqueta Wine Cooperative building, with a varied collection of objects used in grape production and winemaking, including items related to associated activities such as cooperage and basketry.
- The Caxias do Sul Railway Site, listed by the IPHAE since 2001 and dedicated to preserving the memory of the railway and trains in the city. The site includes the following structures: the Caxias do Sul Railway Station, the VFRGS (later RFFSA) railway yard, passenger platforms, the restroom building, the cargo depot, the locomotive depot, the water tank, and the Administrator's House.

Under the administration of the Order of Capuchins, the Capuchin Museum operates, hosting temporary thematic exhibitions and housing an important collection of sacred art gathered from across the state. It also preserves other objects, such as liturgical vestments, books, paintings, photographs, manuscripts, musical instruments, agricultural tools, household items, and furniture, all related to the history of the Capuchin Province of Rio Grande do Sul.

Despite the existence of municipal legislation protecting historical heritage, a series of buildings, many of them listed or inventoried, have been altered in "revitalization" or "retrofit" projects. These projects primarily aim to adapt buildings for new uses but rarely follow the rules established by international heritage charters, of which Brazil is a signatory. These charters advocate for minimal and reversible interventions and the preservation of the authenticity and documentary value of buildings. Many of these interventions have been extensive, introducing new elements and volumes while eliminating original ones, radically altering the assets. However, they have been authorized by the city's Historical Heritage Council, responsible for evaluating and approving such projects. Among the historic buildings that have undergone such "revitalizations" are the Eberle Metalworks complex, the Antunes Winery buildings, the São Victor Wine Cooperative, the Rio Grande Winery, the Caxias Pasta Factory, the Alfred Clothing factory, the Marumby factory, and the Germani Mill complex, among others. According to Costa, Moraes, and Stumpp, most of the so-called "restoration" projects recently carried out in the city are not true restorations but rather renovations lacking theoretical grounding and/or recognition of the historical or aesthetic value of the object, disregarding international principles and prioritizing questionable practical needs and speculative interests.

=== Tourism ===
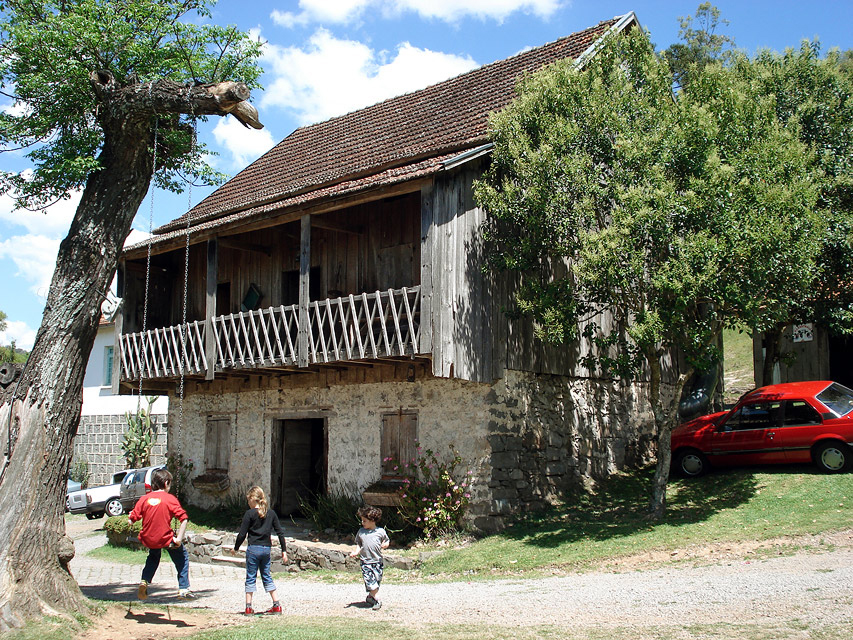
Typical colonial house and winery in the rural area, part of the Caminhos da Colônia tourist route

In addition to the traditional Grape Festival, which has strong folkloric roots and attracts around one million visitors, tourism in Caxias do Sul has been relatively underexplored but has seen growing attention in recent times. In 2010, the Tourism Secretariat launched the Municipal Tourism Week project, featuring programs and tours for the public and discussions among experts. In addition to established routes such as La Città, Caminhos da Colônia, Estrada do Imigrante, and Ana Rech, where visitors learn about the city's and immigrants’ history while enjoying traditional dishes and characteristic landscapes, a 2008 partnership between the municipal government and Sebrae/RS identified other regions with tourism potential, including the rural districts of Fazenda Souza, Santa Lúcia do Piaí, Vila Cristina, Vila Oliva, and Vila Seca, revealing possibilities unknown even to the local population. This study led to new proposals for invigorating the sector. Between 2005 and 2008, the city received an average of 350,000 tourists per year, with projections indicating an 11% growth by December 2011.

In 2007, there were about 20 hotels and 30,000 beds across establishments of all categories, from inns and park hotels to traditional houses. In recent years, several older hotels closely tied to local history, such as the Alfred Hotel and the Real Hotel, have closed, but larger ones, such as the Blue Tree Towers, Norton Hotel, and Intercity Hotel, have entered the market. Other well-known attractions include the São Pelegrino Church, with a significant series of paintings by Aldo Locatelli and notable bronze doors crafted by Augusto Murer; a replica of part of the original urban core built in the Grape Festival exhibition park; the National Monument to the Immigrant, a work by Antonio Caringi; the Casa de Pedra Museum; the Caxias do Sul Cathedral; and the Municipal Museum of Caxias do Sul.

=== Sports ===
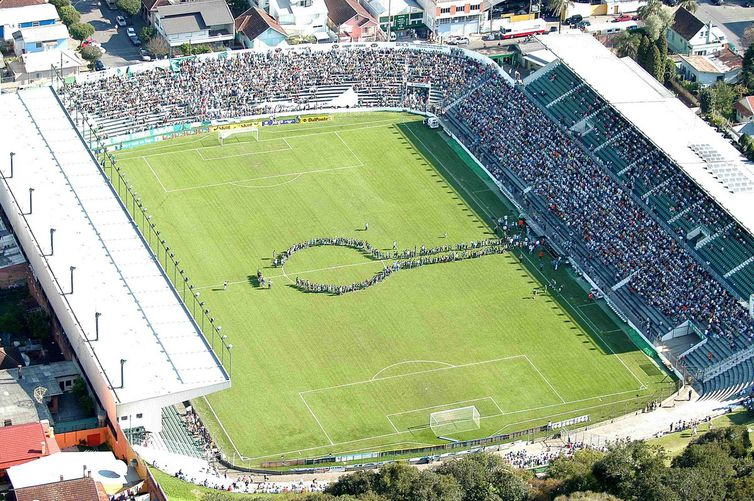
Aerial view of Alfredo Jaconi Stadium

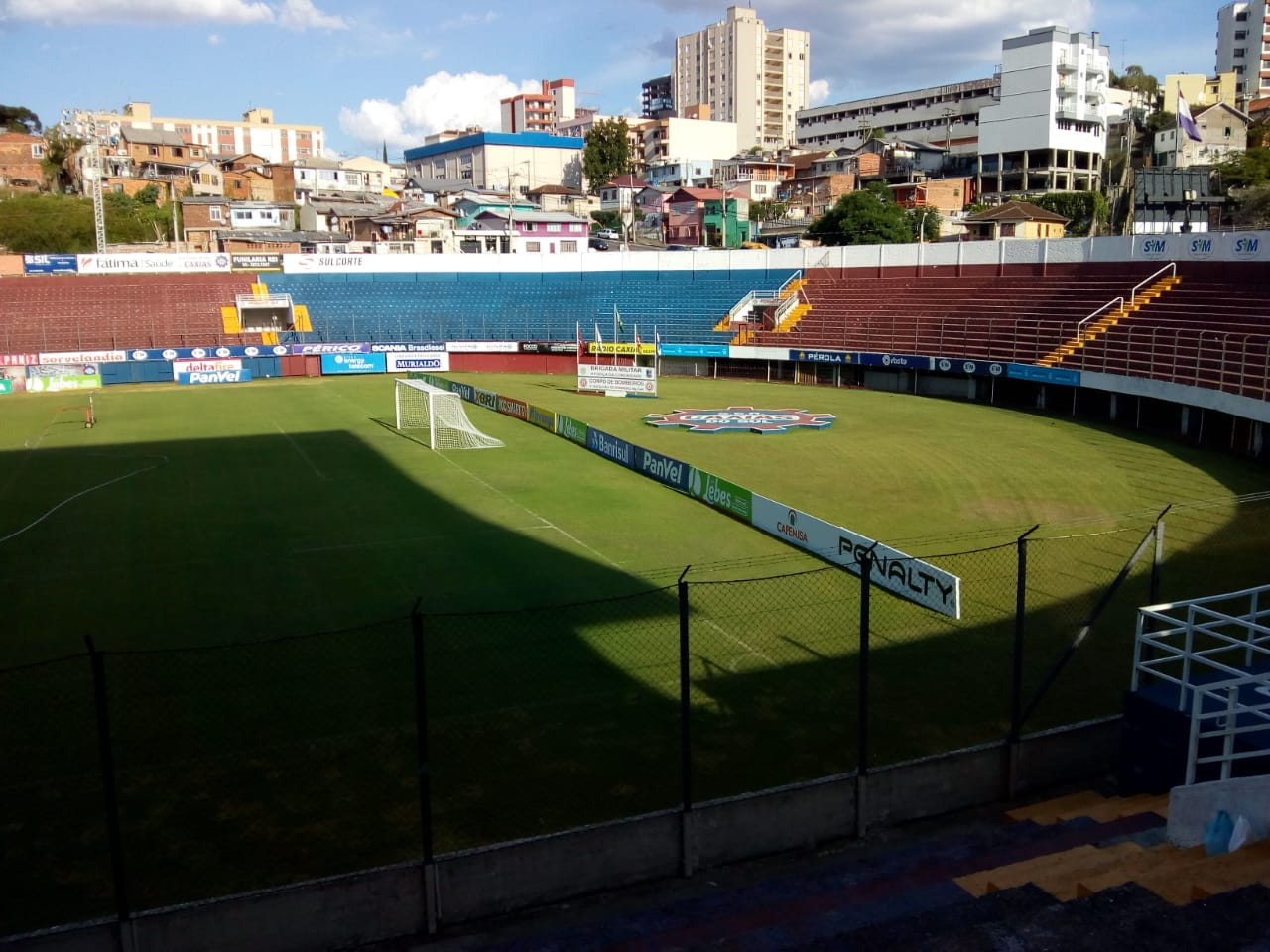
Interior view of Centenário Stadium

There is significant sport activity in the city, with some clubs boasting a long tradition. In terms of football, the Sociedade Esportiva e Recreativa Caxias do Sul, based at the Francisco Stédile Stadium, won the Gaucho Championship in 2000, and the Esporte Clube Juventude, with its Alfredo Jaconi Stadium. In 2020, Juventude secured promotion to the 2021 Série A. The club has also won a Brazilian Championship - Série B (1994), a Gaucho Championship (1998), and a Brazilian Cup (1999).

In terms of basketball, the Caxias do Sul Basketball team has won six titles in the Gaucho Basketball Championship and participates in the NBB, with the Vasco da Gama Gymnasium consistently packed, achieving significant results, including reaching the quarterfinals in 2018. Several other teams compete in the Municipal Championship. The city has also hosted the Brazilian Master Basketball Championship and, in 2010, the men's adult competitions of the South Brazilian Club Basketball Championship. In terms of women's handball, the APAHAND/UCS/Prefeitura de Caxias team has achieved strong results in the National Handball League and had players called up to the Brazilian national team, which won a bronze medal at the Youth Olympic Games in Singapore.

In terms of volleyball, the UCS team has participated in several editions of the Brazilian Volleyball Super League. In terms of tennis, the Recreio da Juventude competes in the S.C.A. Gaucho Tennis Circuit, and the city hosts the Caxias do Sul Tennis Open. Traditional recreational clubs, such as Recreio da Juventude and Clube Juvenil, also have robust sports facilities, offering opportunities to practice various sports, including football, futsal, artistic gymnastics, handball, judo, swimming, tennis, and volleyball, and earning awards in various state and national competitions. The municipal government, through its Sports and Leisure Secretariat, supports and funds a range of other associations, championships, and sports clubs across various categories and age groups, including athletics, squash, motocross, running, nine-pin bowling, canoeing, swimming, and others.

=== Cuisine ===
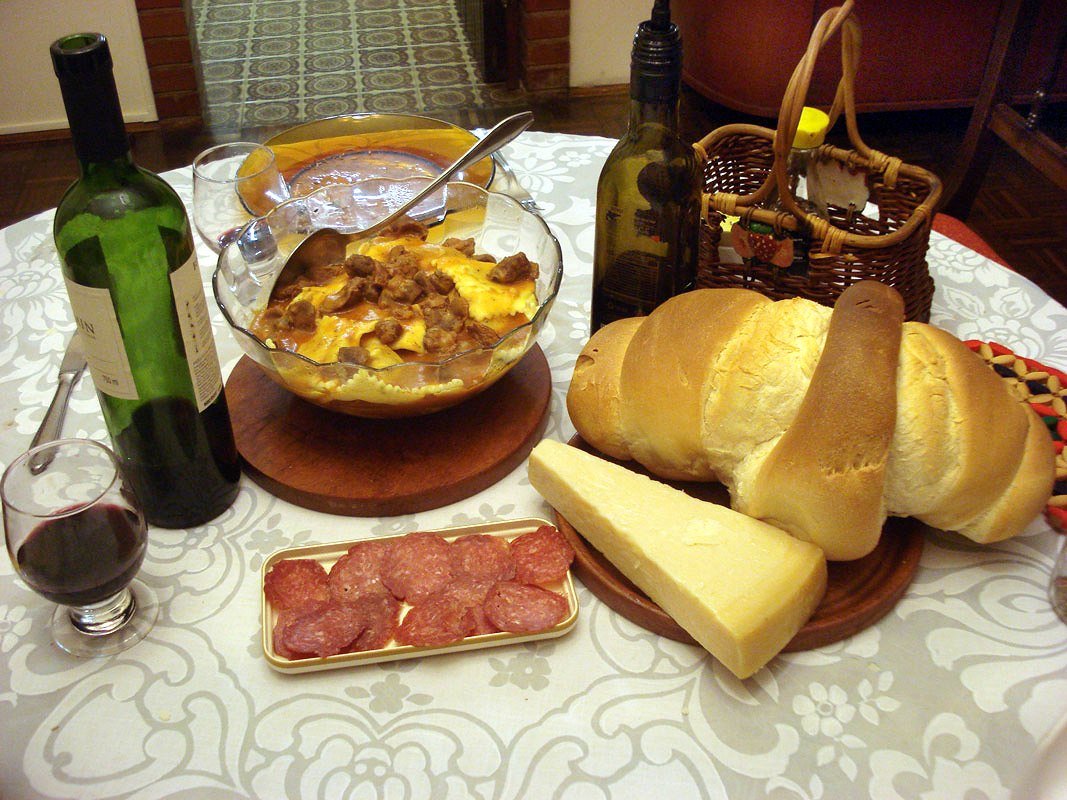
Table with typical Italian dishes: red wine, tortelli with meat sauce, salami, Parmesan cheese, and colonial bread

The foundation of Italian folk cuisine in Caxias do Sul includes roasted galeto (galeto al primo canto), soft or fried polenta, and pasta dishes such as bigoli (spaghetti) and tortei (dumplings stuffed with pumpkin purée seasoned with nutmeg), but other dishes are also popular, such as agnolini soup (stuffed pasta filled with chicken meat), radicci salad with pancetta (a variety of chicory with narrow, bitter leaves seasoned with fried bacon), canjica, crem (a type of grated horseradish preserved in red vinegar and used as a meat condiment), homemade breads and biscuits, chicken soup, risotto, preserves and sweets, notably uvada, salami, fortaia (omelette with cheese or salami), and cheese, along with many varieties of wine. However, influenced by other ethnic groups and local conditions that necessitated cultivating crops better suited to the region's climate, the city developed a cuisine with more varied and, in many ways, unique characteristics. From the Germans, the potato was incorporated, and from the gauchos, locals adopted jerky, barbecue, beans, rice, manioc, sweet potato, chimarrão, cachaça, native wild fruits such as gabiroba, blackberry, and pitanga, and pine nut from the araucaria tree.

In recent times, to appeal to new clientele, traditional cuisine has also been adapted and "softened": the radicci, once prized for its bitterness, is now commonly served in restaurants using younger, less bitter leaves; cheese and salami boards are enriched with varieties not part of the early immigrants’ menu, recipes are adapted using ingredients different from traditional ones, and dish presentation has been modified under the influence of international standards and tourism agency demands.

The city is known for the abundance and quality of its cuisine, served in approximately 300 restaurants and about 600 other establishments. Several specialize in traditional cuisine, others focus on burgers and steaks, and in recent years, some have diversified their menus, embracing international cuisines, particularly from the East, especially Japanese and Chinese. The most significant growth has been in pizzerias, all-you-can-eat restaurants, and delivery services. The snack sector is also expanding and diversifying, with many establishments resembling restaurants. There is also a good number of churrascarias.

=== Holidays ===
In addition to the national holidays established by law, the city has its own holidays: Good Friday and Corpus Christi (floating), May 26, the day of Our Lady of Caravaggio, and November 2, All Souls’ Day.

== Sister cities ==
Caxias do Sul has the following sister cities:

- Pedavena, Belluno, Italy, since 2009;
- Little Rock, Arkansas, United States, since 2017;
- Clarksdale, Mississippi, United States, since 2020.

== Notable people ==
- Hygino Corsetti – Brazilian politician, former Minister of Communications.
- Paulo Bellini – Brazilian businessman, founder of Marcopolo S.A..
- Tite (born 1961), Football coach, former manager of the Brazil national football team
- Celso Roth, football coach
- Marcelo Demoliner, tennis player
- Fernando Kreling, volleyball player
- Guilherme Roth, swimmer
- Alexandro Pozzer, handball player
- Alex Telles (born 1992), football player
- André Todescato (born 1982), football player
- Bressan (born 1993), football player
- Everton Giovanella, football player
- Thaisa Serafini, squash player
- Rafael "Brasa" dos Santos, physical trainer

== See also ==
- Italian immigration in Rio Grande do Sul
- List of municipalities in Rio Grande do Sul
- Nossa Senhora de Pompéia Hospital
- São Romédio Community
- Pietro Nosadini
- Municipal Museum of Caxias do Sul
- Historic Center of Caxias do Sul
- João Spadari Adami Municipal Historical Archive
