= Giuseppe di Stefano Paternó =

Italian politician and lawyer (1862- 1924?)

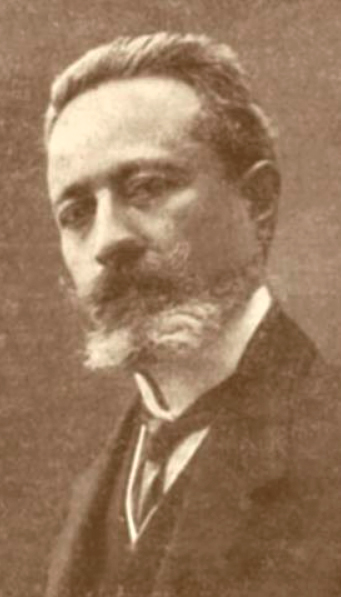
Giuseppe Paternó.

Giuseppe di Stefano Paternó (Palma di Montechiaro, October 7, 1862 - Italy, after 1924) was an Italian politician and lawyer active in the Brazilian state of Rio Grande do Sul at the beginning of the 20th century, as the main proponent and organizer of the cooperative movement.

== Biography ==
Not much is known about his life before he arrived in Brazil. Son of Diego Paternó and Maria Meli, Giuseppe was hired by the state government of the Rio Grande do Sul to disseminate and structure the cooperative model among rural producers. At the end of the 19th century, an Italian newspaper described him as a subversive, who was responsible for a failed attempt to reform the productive system of the Modica region, and called him a "radical socialist lawyer, who worked with the also Sicilian Francesco Mormina Penna, a lawyer and scholar of Mazzini's thought. [...] The dominant classes found in the experiment, driven by Stefano Paternó, a dangerous organization, which contrasted with the dominant group". He promoted cooperativism in his home country and in Paraguay, where he also founded an Italian colony, constituting the Italo-American Colonizing Society and obtained fifty leagues from the Paraguayan government to settle. The initiative faced many difficulties due to poor access conditions and lack of infrastructure. In 1911, through the efforts of the state government, the Sociedade Nacional de Agricultura, the Center for Economic Development, and the Rio Grande do Sul Pastoral Society, Giuseppe began his activities in the state, where he would leave his main mark.

== The Cooperative Movement ==
The state authorities were interested in dynamizing and qualifying the wine industry, which had become the basis of the economy of the Italian-settled region. At the beginning of the 20th century, the southern product was already exported to São Paulo and Rio de Janeiro, but faced two major problems. The first was the low quality of the product. The main source of Rio Grande do Sul wine was the Isabel grape, a rustic variety, undemanding and very adaptable, which thrived well in the region, but produced an acid wine. The acidity of the local soils aggravated the situation, and at a time when the producers were trying to consolidate their presence in the large markets in the center of the country, intermediaries adulterated the product received for sale with the addition of chemical substances and a lot of water, bringing the wine from Rio Grande do Sul into discredit. The second problem was the poor skills of the rural producer himself. The winemaking techniques brought from Italy by the immigrants were artisanal and homemade, leading to difficulties in maintaining a homogeneous standard among the many producers. In addition, hygiene was precarious, and vine growing techniques were still based more on tradition than science.

In order for colonial wine to become competitive, it needed to improve its quality by using finer grape varieties, and not only modernize, but also professionalize the production, storage, and distribution systems. To achieve this, the government started a project to enlighten the producers through leaflets and informative manuals, regional fairs to exchange experiences, and lectures with specialized technicians, mostly foreigners. The regional economy was going through a transition phase, the recent urbanization of the colonies, especially Caxias do Sul, threatened to change the emphasis of the productive sectors, and the government wanted to preserve the profitability of the local wine, and maintain the producers in the countryside in better living conditions. The farmers were also threatened by the merchant class, which mediated the main economic relationships, had its own goals, and was the biggest social force after the government at the time. For the farmers, mostly with limited culture and no business sense, joining into associations would be a strategy for action, a form of resistance against competitors, and would give more control over the intermediaries, besides eliminating much of their necessities. Cooperativism was seen as endowed with intrinsic moral merits, expressed in a system of equitable division of labor, expenses, and profits, that required an ethical attitude detached from the personal interests of the participants.

=== Paternó's participation ===
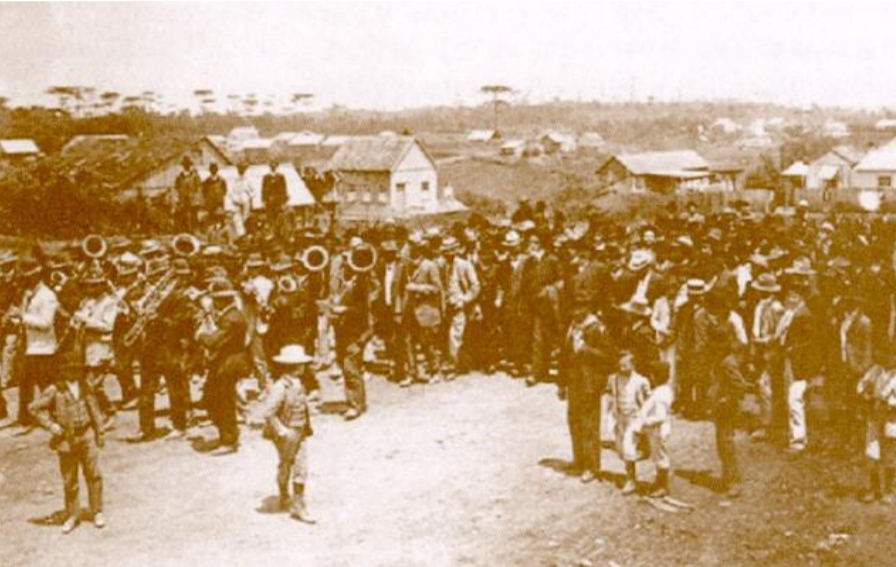
Public reception to Giuseppe Paternó on his arrival in Caxias do Sul.

Paternó was the agent chosen by the state government to organize the cooperative movement among Italian winegrowers. According to reports from the time, he was a man of great culture and brilliant orator, with a reputation as an "expert in setting up cooperatives". Arriving in Porto Alegre on September 1, 1911, he already had a scheduled program of lectures, focusing on the objectives of the Sociedade Nacional de Agricultura, immigration in the southern states, the economic scenario of Brazil, and the cooperative organization as a means of promoting agro-industrial progress. On the 15th, he founded an agricultural cooperative in Vila Nova, and on October 2 he presided over the launching of the Cooperativa Agrícola in Caxias do Sul, whose winery was capable of processing 150,000 tons of grapes a year at its inauguration.

Having Caxias as the center of his activities, Paternó would hold lectures and educational activities throughout the colonial region. According to J. Monserrat, "Caxias do Sul was his headquarters. When he was not spreading the word in action, he would visit the local industries and spend whole afternoons among the vineyards that surrounded the cities, listening to the colonial life and its intimacy. In the evenings, he would meet with municipal leaders and interested parties, and discuss and draw up plans until late at night". The interest aroused by his activity reached the German colonies in Sinos River Valley, where he also gave lectures, and led to partnership contracts that launched the idea in Rio de Janeiro and Minas Gerais. The establishment of the cooperatives also involved, as an important aspect, the creation of credit and savings banks for the farmers, favoring production with low-interest, long-term loans and helping them to manage their finances. In the presentation by Sandro Rogério dos Santos,

For Paternó, the creation of the social wineries had the purpose of minimizing counterfeiting and mercantile speculation with the objective of lowering wine prices. Among the functions of the cooperatives and the social wineries were to promote the moral and material development of the members; to facilitate access to capital at low interest rates; to facilitate sales and the acquisition of inputs at lower prices; to promote the development and improvement of rural products and industries. It can be seen in Paternó's statements that only by the union of efforts in the form of a cooperative, the settlers could escape from the merciless speculators and the vampire parasites, because with agricultural credit, with agricultural insurance, and with cultural expansion, the development of industries based on farming would occur.

Paternó had the full support of the federal, state, and municipal governments, and because of his efforts, the Associação dos Comerciantes was reactivated, which also started to support him, and resulted in fast and encouraging results; his motto was "one for all and all for one". In 1912, the press was already announcing the great adherence of rural producers to the new system, which was spreading to other sectors, such as lumber, dairy, meat, and railroads. Lard cooperatives were formed in Guaporé, Veranópolis, Garibaldi, Bento Gonçalves, Antônio Prado and Caxias do Sul. The Antônio Prado cooperative alone had 920 members. The dairy cooperatives or "social dairies" were three in Garibaldi, three in Guaporé, six in Veranópolis, one in Nova Prata, one in Antônio Prado, four in Bento Gonçalves, and one in Porto Alegre. In Alfredo Chaves a lumber cooperative was formed, bringing together 42 sawmills. In the Semanário newspaper's description, Paternó was tireless, running "from one city to another, holding memorable meetings and conferences that deeply convince the farmers; that congregate, that inflame, and that fill them with enthusiasm. He organizes cooperatives for wine production, for the industrialization of pork products and even for credit banks. He obtains money at affordable interest rates, builds large establishments, imports adequate machinery, hires specialized technicians in Italy and begins a centralizing movement".

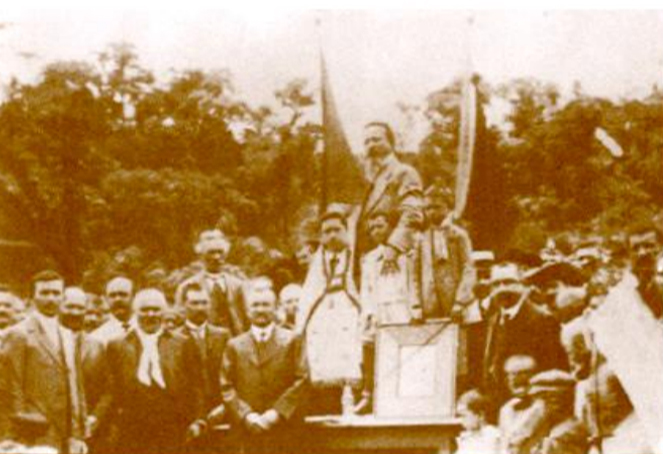
Launching of the cornerstone of Antônio Prado's first agricultural cooperative on October 21, 1911. Paternó is in the center.

Sandra Pesavento mentions that Paternó is credited with the direct creation of sixteen cooperatives, "centralized in the settlers' savings, with the purpose of promoting the improvement of the colonial products, providing the small producers with credit, technology, and implements to improve production", and many others appeared based on his example. The proliferation of initiatives justified the organization of a federation, the União das Cooperativas Riograndenses de Responsabilidade, considered the first central credit cooperative in Brazil, founded in Porto Alegre in September 1912, with Álvaro Nunes Pereira as president, representing the Economic Center of Rio Grande do Sul, and Paternó as general director. A notice in the newspaper O Brazil of December 3, 1912 illustrates the success of the movement:

In Caxias, the agricultural cooperative, created in September, has 1,200 members, all producers. The social wine cellar is under construction, with 25 meters in front and 60 meters in back, and thirty workers are working daily. The wine cellar is intended to unify the white and red wine types, which produces 200,000 to 250,000 quintals of wine per year. It will be directed by a technical staff of recognized competence that has already left Italy and should arrive next February. The Caxias cooperative covers other products, such as salami, hams, etc. In Nova Trento, the cooperative was founded in early October, with five hundred members, and has a winery under construction that measures 20 by 40 meters. In Antônio Prado, the cooperative extends to Nova Treviso, Nova Roma, Castro Alves, and the 4th district of Vacaria. There are 700 members. A building is erected for butter preparation and lard refining, and a zootechnical station with bulls and pigs is already functioning. In Bento Gonçalves, the cooperative organization takes a huge step forward, and a social wine cellar is built there. A land was acquired around the great waterfall of Parati, with a 500-horsepower waterfall, for the foundation of a linen and silk fabric factory. It will start with a regular number of looms. In São Marcos, the social winery cellar holds 20,000 quintals of wine. It will be directed by Mr. Monaco. In Nova Milano, a wine and lard cooperative; in Nova Vicenza, a wine cooperative; in Borghetto, Garibaldi district, a straw hat industry, which will only sell in this capital and in São Paulo, a cooperative for dairy products, mainly cheeses, which will soon be appreciated in Rio de Janeiro; in Santa Barbara, a cooperative for Swiss-type cheeses; in Alfredo Chaves and Guaporé, cooperatives for lard refining.

However, the cooperatives' activity soon began to be seen as a threat to the monopoly that urban merchants held over the sale of grapes and wine, as well as to the independent producers, who were not contemplated by the facilities offered by the cooperatives and had not benefited from the exemption of territorial, industrial, and export taxes. In addition, the growth in production has lowered its selling value, reducing everyone's profits. A public polemic on the merits of cooperativism began. Paternó suffered defamation and personal attacks, his political positions and loyalties were questioned, and influential voices began a fierce campaign to dismantle the cooperatives, with the Associação dos Comerciantes as one of the main engines, claiming that the tax exemption was unfair, that the quality of the wines was not improving, and that there was inferior product left to be placed on the market. The producers began to feel insecure, and in 1913, a national crisis made it difficult to get loans. The state government did not transfer all the money promised, and the cooperatives became disorganized and started to lose money, leading the government to turn against its own creation. An unfavorable report by the intendant of Caxias, José Pena de Moraes, sent to the state government in 1913, precipitated the disintegration of the movement, and in November the federation of cooperatives was extinguished. As a result, the whole movement went into recess, and most of the equipment acquired for the associations was sold as scrap. Paternó left Rio Grande do Sul still in 1913, and in the news of his departure, the Correio do Povo blasted the "monstrous addictions" of Rio Grande do Sul's cooperatives and Paternó's "evil interference".

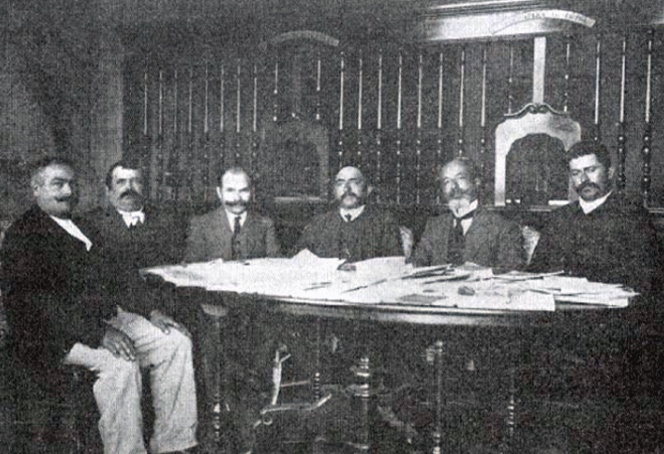
Board of Directors of the Cooperativa Agrícola de Caxias. Paternó is second from right to left.

In 1924, he sent a card from Italy to Abramo Eberle, and then his traces were lost. Paternó's legacy, however, remained as the perception of the necessity of modernization of the wine sector and the union of the producing class to overcome the difficulties common to all. In the words of Franco Cenni, "the positive effects of Paternó's audacity remained evident in new habits, beneath the agrarian conservatism, as one of the profound contributions of Italian thought in Rio Grande do Sul". For J. Monserrat, Paternó "was the author of one of the most important economic achievements of the decade", and for Sandro Rogério dos Santos, he was the dynamo of a movement that marked the regional economy and politics, being "a man ahead of his time. The lack of money, the high cost of living, high interest rates, and the economic situation made his achievements unsuccessful". In Picolotto's understanding, part of the system's failure can also be attributed to the settlers' lack of organizational capacity to implement the enterprises. Of all the cooperatives formed at the time, only the milk cooperative União Colonial Santa Clara de Garibaldi and the survived and showed a performance well above average.

The cooperativist banner, with the eagle perched on a bundle of sticks, would be revived by Paulo Monteiro de Barros in 1929, when the movement was rethought and rearticulated under new conditions. In Picolotto's words, the producers "were becoming aware of their condition of being exploited by traders and industrialists. The failed experiences of the past were seen as a learning process so that the movement would not make the same mistakes again. [...] The first cooperative founded in this new phase was Forqueta, in the district of the same name in Caxias do Sul, in 1929. This initiative was soon followed by the creation of others. During the 1930s, 25 new cooperatives were founded in the Serra Gaúcha alone".

== See also ==
- History of Rio Grande do Sul
- History of Caxias do Sul
- Cooperative
