= Shrine of St. Paulina =

Church complex in Nova Trento, Santa Catarina, Brazil

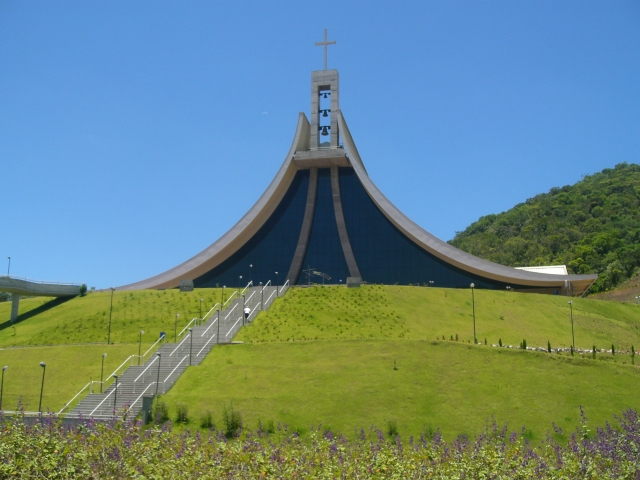
- 27°15′08″S 48°56′36″W
- Location: Nova Trento
- Country: Brazil
- Denomination: Roman Catholic
- Website: santuariosantapaulina.org.br

Specifications
- Capacity: 3,000

The Shrine of St. Paulina, also known as the Sanctuary of St. Paulina, is a church complex located in Nova Trento, Santa Catarina, Brazil. The church is dedicated to St. Pauline of the Agonizing Heart of Jesus and is located in Madre hill where the nun lived and professed her faith.

== History ==
St. Paulina was canonized by Pope John Paul II on 19 May 2002 in a ceremony in St. Peter's Square, thereby becoming Brazil's first female saint. Construction began shortly afterwards after approval from the general assembly of the Little Sisters of the Immaculate Conception, the congregation founded by St. Paulina, and completed in 926 days on 22 January 2006.

== Architecture ==
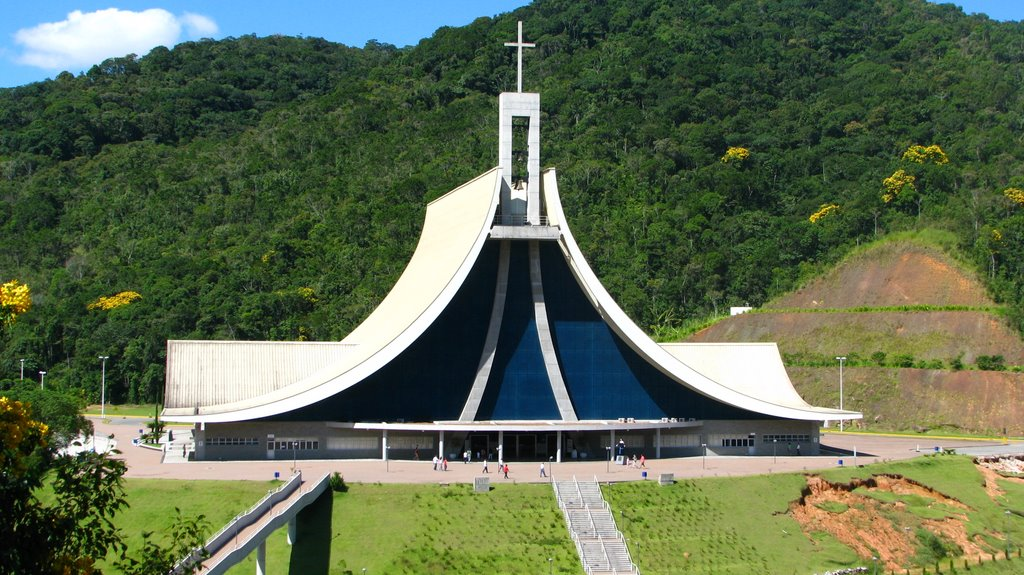
Aerial view of the church, and the steps and ramp leading to it

The church occupies an area of 9,616 square metres (103,510 sq ft) with the building occupying an area of 6,925 square metres (74,540 sq ft). The church building is conical in shape, resembling two hands in prayer or a tent. It overlooks the Tijucas River valley, and can be accessed by a flight of 113 steps or a 170-metre (560 ft) long ramp. The church has a capacity of 3,000 people with a granite altar in the centre. The church also houses three smaller chapels: The Chapel of the Most Holy, The Chapel of Reconciliation and St. Paulina Chapel, with the latter holding a bone of St. Paulina's arm as a relic.

The shrine is visited by about 70,000 people every month. The complex is also home to other buildings associated with the life of St. Paulina. The Chapel of our Lady of Lourdes, a smaller and older church in the complex, was originally declared the sanctuary of St. Paulina by Eusébio Scheid, then the Archbishop of Florianópolis on 9 July 1998. The Chapel of the Sisters is a house where the congregation of Little Sisters of the Immaculate Conception was established. The complex also has a Colonial Museum housing items used by Italian immigrants and a Silk Museum, which is a replica of the factory established by St. Paulina to provide for the congregation and the local community.

== See also ==
- List of largest church buildings
- Basilica of Our Lady of Aparecida
