= Pauline of the Agonizing Heart of Jesus =

Brazilian Catholic religious sister and saint (1865–1942)

Saint Pauline of the Agonizing Heart of Jesus CIIC
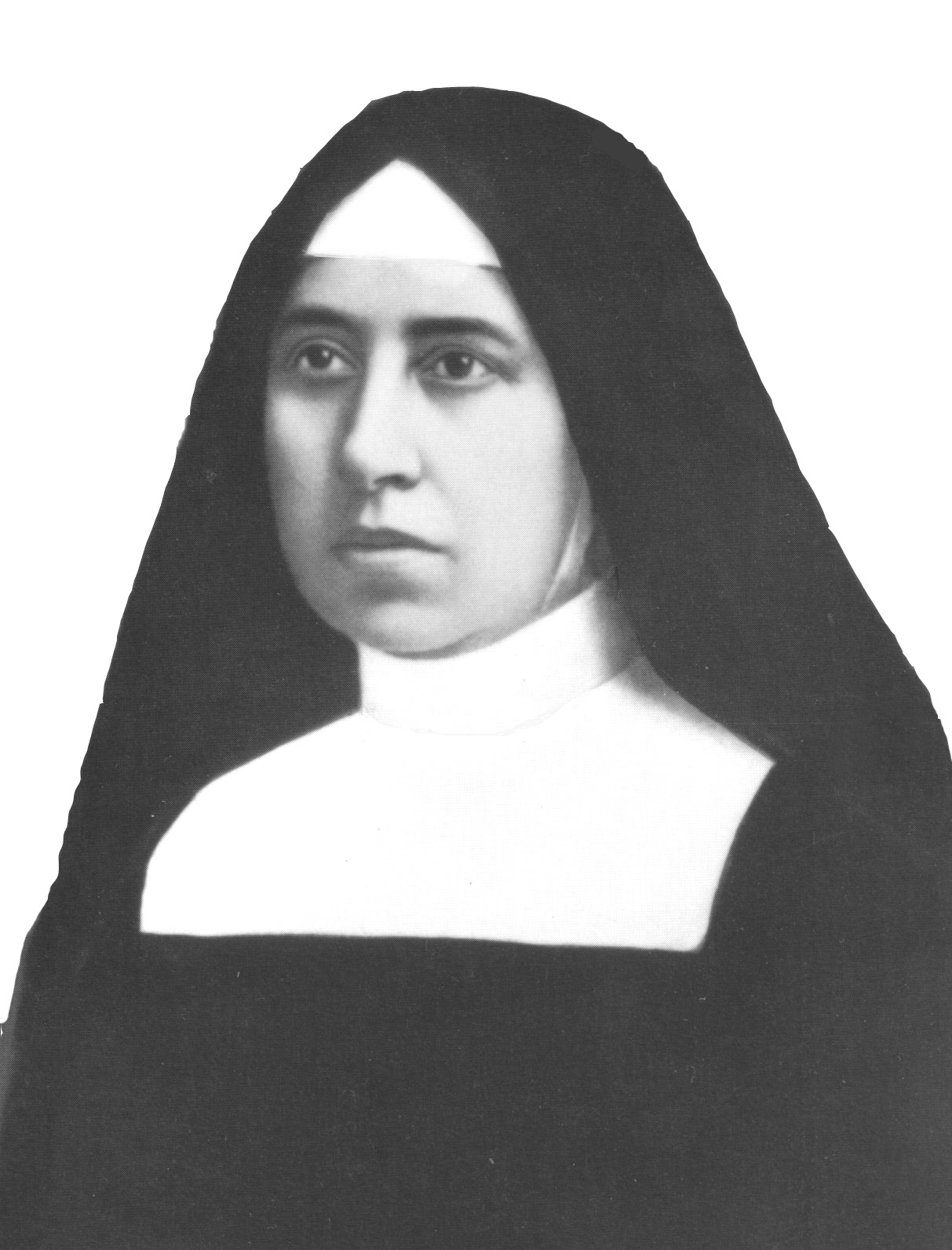

Virgin
- Born: Amabile Lucia Visintainer; December 16, 1865; Vigolo Vattaro, County of Tyrol, Austria-Hungary
- Died: July 9, 1942 (aged 76); Ipiranga, São Paulo (state), Brazil
- Venerated in: Roman Catholic Church
- Beatified: October 18, 1991, Florianópolis, Santa Catarina, Brazil by Pope John Paul II
- Canonized: 19 May 2002, Vatican City by Pope John Paul II
- Major shrine: Sanctuary of St. Pauline, Nova Trento, Santa Catarina
- Feast: 9 July

Pauline of the Agonizing Heart of Jesus, CIIC (born Amabile Lucia Visintainer; December 16, 1865 – July 9, 1942), was Brazilian religious sister from Austria-Hungary who founded of the Congregation of the Little Sisters of the Immaculate Conception, who serve the poor.

She was the first Brazilian to be proclaimed a saint by the Catholic Church when she was canonized on 19 May 2002, by Pope John Paul II.

== Life ==
=== Early life ===
Pauline of the Agonizing Heart of Jesus was born as Amabile Lucia Visintainer on December 16, 1865, the second daughter of Antonio Napoleone Visintainer and Anna Pianezzer in the town of Vigolo Vattaro, in the County of Tyrol. Her ancestors were Germanic, who had settled in the region of Vigolo Vattaro as early as 1491, their surname being originally spelled "Wiesenteiner".

Like many others in the area, the Visintainer family was very poor but practising Catholics. In September 1875, the family, along with a hundred other people of the town, about a fifth of its population, emigrated to the State of Santa Catarina in Brazil, where they founded the village of Vigolo, now part of Nova Trento. She was known even at a youthful age for her piety and charity. From an early age she spoke of giving her life to God. She had very little intellectual education, but great love for the Catholic faith and for the suffering and poor. After receiving her First Communion at about age 12, she began to participate in the life of the local parish, teaching catechism to children, visiting the sick and cleaning the local chapel.

=== Religious life ===
On 12 July 1890, Visintainer and her friend, Virginia Rosa Nicolodi, under the spiritual direction of a Jesuit, Luigi Rossi, committed their lives to religious service, under dedication to the Immaculate Conception of Our Lady. They began by caring for a woman suffering from terminal cancer, in a small house which was donated to the small community and the young girls began a schedule of religious living. After the woman's death the following year, they were joined by a third friend, Teresa Anna Maule.

In 1895, Rossi and Visintainer, seeing the need for a more formal and secure organization of the young women coming to them, decided to establish a religious congregation called the Little Sisters of the Immaculate Conception, which was approved by José de Camargo Barros, Bishop of Curitiba. In December of that same year, the founding trio took religious vows. Visintainer took the religious name Pauline of the Agonizing Heart of Jesus. The congregation, Brazil's first locally founded, grew quickly throughout the state, and in 1903 Pauline was elected their Superior General for life. She moved from Nova Trento to Ipiranga, São Paulo, where she opened a convent of the congregation in order to take care of orphans, the children of former slaves – slavery having been ended by the Empire of Brazil only in 1888, and aged slaves who had been left to die because they could no longer work.

In 1909 Pauline was removed from her position as Superior General by the Archbishop of São Paulo, Duarte Leopoldo e Silva, following a series of disputes within the congregation. She was sent to work with the sick at the Santa Casa and the elderly of the Hospice of St. Vincent de Paul at Bragança Paulista, without being able to assume an active role in the congregation. She spent her spare time praying in support of the congregation. In 1918, with the permission of Archbishop Duarte, she was brought back by the Superior General, Vicência Teodora, to live at the motherhouse of the congregation at Ipiranga, where she would remain until her death. Pauline was acknowledged as the "Venerable Mother Foundress", when the Decree of Praise was granted by Pope Pius XI on 19 May 1933 to the Congregation of the Little Sisters, establishing it as one of pontifical right.

Pauline's health began a long, slow decline in 1938, as she fought a losing battle with diabetes. In two operations, first her middle finger and then her right arm were amputated. She spent the last months of her life totally blind. On 9 July 1942 she died with the last words, "God's will be done".

=== Veneration ===
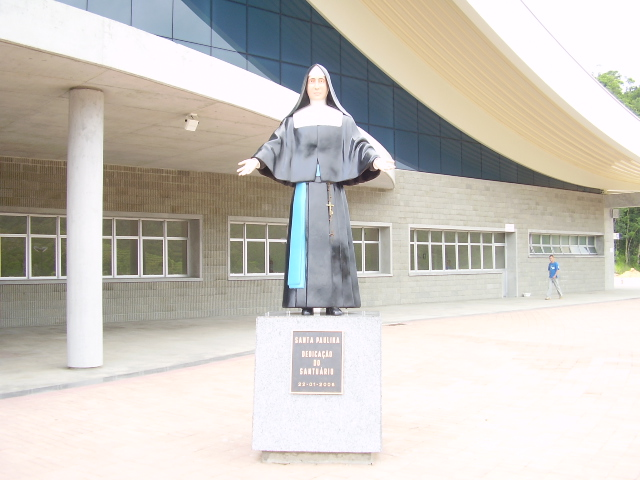
Statue of Saint Pauline in Nova Trento

Pauline was beatified by Pope John Paul II on 18 October 1991, during his visit to Florianópolis. For her beatification, three relics were made from the fingerbones of her remaining hand. One was given to Pope John Paul, the second to the convent where she had lived and is currently housed in the Shrine of St. Paulina in Nova Trento, and the other to her relations, Albert Visintainer and his family of Mount Carmel, Pennsylvania, United States. This can be seen at the St. Pauline Visintainer Center in Kulpmont, Pennsylvania.

Pope John Paul II canonized Paulina on 19 May 2002 in a ceremony in Saint Peter's Square,. Hundreds of Brazilians, including then-President Fernando Henrique Cardoso, attended the event. Her feast day is 9 July.

== Literature ==
- (en) Frederick A. Farace, STL, Love's Harvest: The Life of Blessed Pauline, published 1994 (Milford, Ohio, USA: Faith Publishing Co., 1997) ISBN 1-877678-31-7
- (pt) Gesiel [Theodoro da Silva] Júnior, Madre Paulina – Uma holy passou por Avaré [One Saint just for Avaré] (Avaré, Brazil: Editions Gril, 2002)
- (it) Célia B[astiana]. Cadorin, Essere per gli altri — Cronistoria di Madre Paolina del Cuore Agonizzante di Gesù [Be for others - Biography of Mother Pauline of the Agonizing Heart of Jesus] (Vigolo Vattaro, Trentino, Italy: Congregazione Piccole Suore dell'Immacola Concezione, Casa Madre Paolina [Congregation of the Little Sisters of the Immaculate Conception, House of Mother Pauline], 1989)
- (it) Guido Lorenzi, La Beata Madre Paolina — fra carisma e obbedienza [Blessed Mother Pauline – Between Charisma and Obedience]. (Milan: Edizioni Àncora, 1991) ISBN 88-7610-383-X
- (it) Anonymous, Piccola storia di una grande Santa [Little Story of a Great Saint] (Trento, Italy: Vita Trentina Editrice [Trentino Life Publishing], 2002)
