= Canela Preta Biological Reserve =

Biological reserve in Santa Catarina, Brazil

- Reserva Biológica Estadual da Canela Preta
- IUCN category Ia (strict nature reserve)
- Location within Brazil
- Nearest city: Brusque, Santa Catarina
- Coordinates: 27.27°S 49.142°W
- Area: 1,899 hectares (4,690 acres)
- Designation: biological reserve
- Created: 20 June 1980

Canela Preta Biological Reserve (Portuguese: Reserva Biológica Estadual da Canela Preta) is a biological reserve in Santa Catarina, Brazil. It is home to vulnerable species of trees, and is closed to the public.

== History ==
The reserve, which lies in the municipalities of Botuverá and Nova Trento, was founded on 20 June 1980 by decree 11,232. The area was 1,844 hectares (4,560 acres), expanded to 1,899 hectares (4,690 acres) on 23 September 1994. The reserve is named after the predominant Ocotea catharinensis of the area. The site is covered by Atlantic Forest. The region is hilly, with many valleys whose streams flow into the Itajaí-Açu and Tijucas rivers.

== Status ==
As of 2009 the State Biological Reserve was a "strict nature reserve" under IUCN protected area category Ia. Since it is home to species of vegetation that are disappearing in the state, the site is closed to the public. It serves as an important genetic reserve and an area for scientific research.

== Bird Species ==
Bird species recorded at the reserve include Scale-throated hermit, Pileated parrot, Black-capped foliage-gleaner, Pale-browed treehunter, Streaked xenops, Olivaceous woodcreeper, Dusky-tailed antbird, White-shouldered fire-eye, Speckle-breasted antpitta, Greenish tyrannulet, Fuscous flycatcher, Blue manakin, Greenish schiffornis, Chestnut-crowned becard, Rufous-browed peppershrike, Golden-rumped euphonia and Red-crowned ant tanager.

== Sources ==
- Reserva Biológica Estadual da Canela Preta, FATMA, archived from the original on 2019-02-12
- "Reserva Biológica Estadual da Canela Preta, Botuverá Santa Catarina", xeno-canto
- Triana, Elisa (29 May 2009), "Strict Nature Reserves in Brazil", The Encyclopedia of Earth
