= Botuverá =

- Municipality
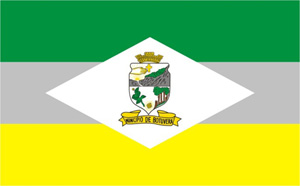
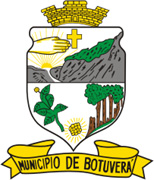
- Flag Coat of arms

- Location in Brazil
- Coordinates: 27°11′56″S 49°4′30″W
- Country: Brazil
- Region: South
- State: Santa Catarina
- Mesoregion: Vale do Itajai

Population (2020)
  - Total: 5,322
- Time zone: UTC -3

Botuverá is a municipality in the state of Santa Catarina in the South region of Brazil.

The municipality contains part of the 1,899 hectares (4,690 acres) Canela Preta Biological Reserve, a full protected area.

== See also ==
- List of municipalities in Santa Catarina
