= Vila Nova, Rio Grande do Sul =

Neighbourhood in Porto Alegre, Brazil

- Country: Brazil
- State: Rio Grande do Sul
- City: Porto Alegre

Vila Nova (meaning New Villa in English) is a neighbourhood (bairro) in the city of Porto Alegre, the state capital of Rio Grande do Sul, in Brazil. It was created by Law 2022 from December 7, 1959.

In 1893, Italian immigrants arrived to Vila Nova, where they cultivated vines and fruits. But unlike what happened in the Serra Gaúcha, they had to purchase their properties and lots. At that time, the area was known as Colônia Vila Nova d'Itália. These people also originated the Festa do Pêssego (or Peach Festival) ceremony, which has been held every year since, attracting many visitors to the neighbourhood.

Vila Nova is home to different social classes with examples of gated communities and social housing blocks.

== Notable residents ==
- Daiane dos Santos, gymnast
- Ronaldinho Gaúcho, footballer
