= São Marcos =

Municipality in Rio Grande do Sul, Brazil

Coordinates: 28°58′15″S 51°4′4″W

- Municipality
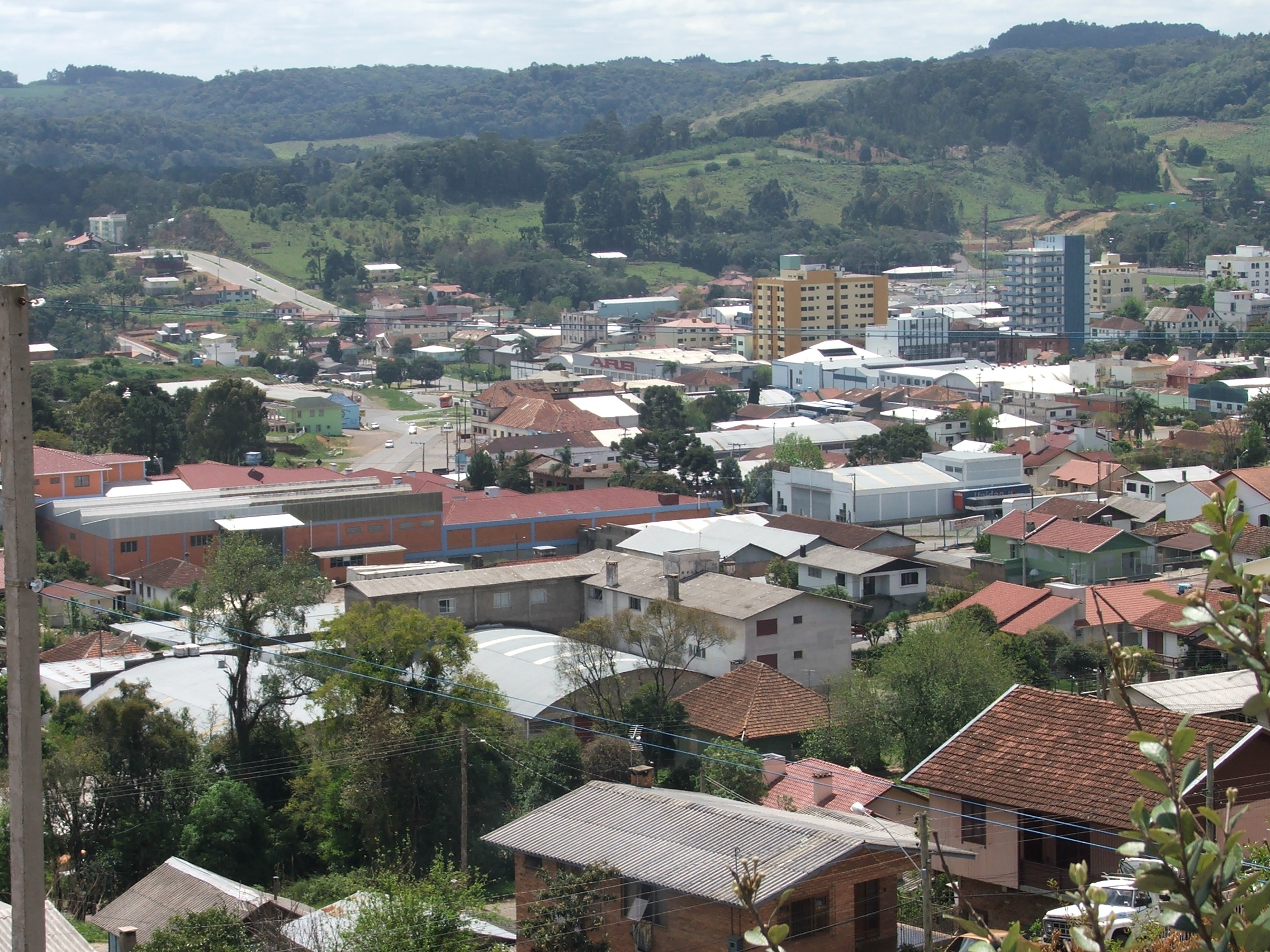
- View of San Marcos

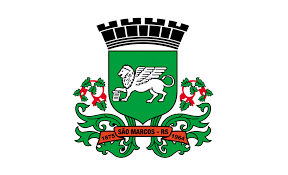
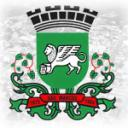
- Flag Coat of arms
- Interactive map of São Marcos
- Country: Brazil
- Time zone: UTC−3 (BRT)

São Marcos is a municipality in the state of Rio Grande do Sul, Brazil. As of 2020, the estimated population was 21,658.

== See also ==
- List of municipalities in Rio Grande do Sul
