= Nova Trento =

- Municipality
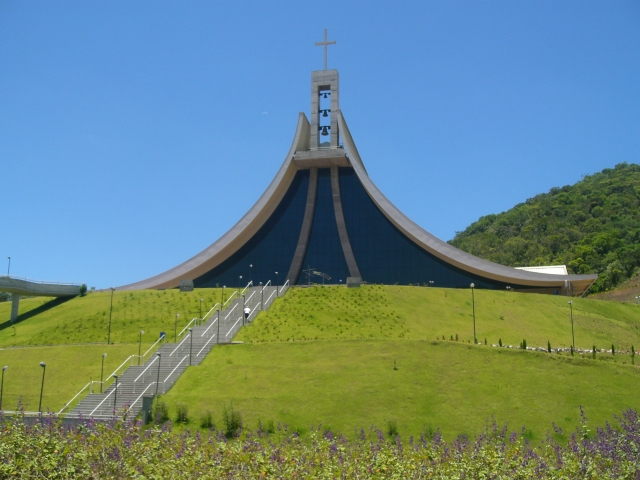

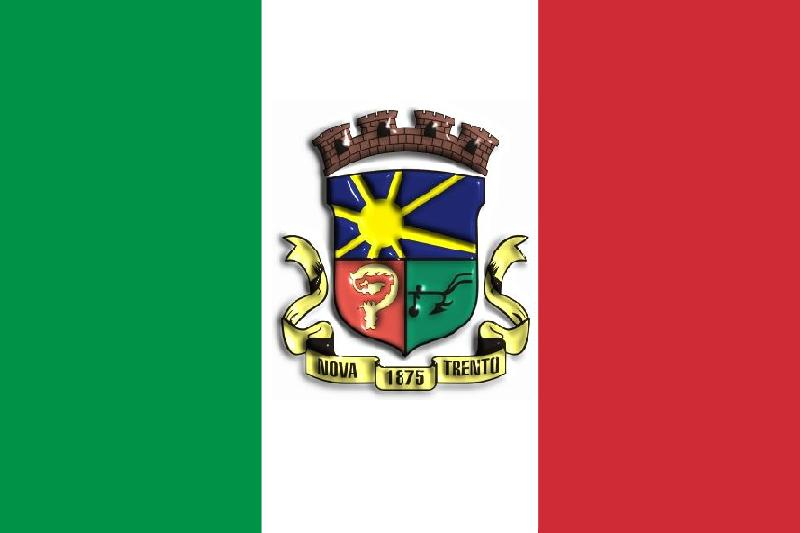
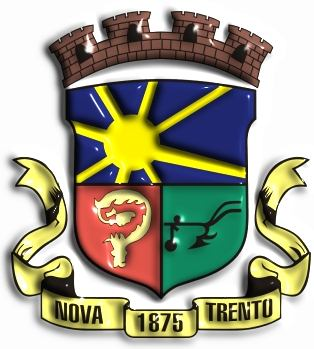
- Flag Coat of arms

- Location in Brazil
- Coordinates: 27°17′12″S 48°55′49″W
- Country: Brazil
- Region: South
- State: Santa Catarina
- Mesoregion: Greater Florianópolis
- Microregion: Tijucas
- Founded: 8 August 1892

Government
  - Mayor: Gian Francesco Voltolini (PP)

Area
  - Total: 402.118 km^{2} (155.259 sq mi)
- Elevation: 30 m (98 ft)

Population (2020)
  - Total: 14,782
  - Density: 36.760/km^{2} (95.209/sq mi)
- Time zone: UTC-3 (Brasilia Time)
  - Summer (DST): UTC-2 (Brasilia Time +1)

Nova Trento is a municipality in the state of Santa Catarina in the South region of Brazil.

The municipality contains part of the 1,899-hectare (4,690-acre) Canela Preta Biological Reserve, a full protected area.

== History ==
Nova Trento was colonized on 1875 by Italian immigrants, and becamea municipality on 8 August 1892.

== Tourism ==
Nova Trento is known for the Madre Paulina Sanctuary, is a catholic church in the city.

== Climate ==
The climate of Nova Trento is classified as humid subtropical climate (Köppen climate classification: Cfa).

== See also ==
- List of municipalities in Santa Catarina
